= Nikola Maslovara =

Serbian comic creator, screenwriter and writer

- Born: 22 December 1946 (age 79) Odžaci, SFR Yugoslavia (now Serbia)
- Areas: Comics creator; writer; publisher; animator
- Notable works: Mickey Mouse; Tom and Jerry; The Pink Panther; Muppet Babies; Felix the Cat; Il Grande Blek

Nikola Maslovara Masli (Serbian Cyrillic: Никола Масловара Масли, Odžaci, 22 December 1946) is a Serbian comics creator, cartoonist, caricaturist, scriptwriter, animator, editor, publisher, and art teacher.

He is a notable Yugoslav comics creator who made his debut at the end of the Silver Age of the Serbian comics in 1971. His more important original characters are: Marko Kraljević (parodical Prince Marko Mrnjavčević), Fijuksi (Fiouxes), Tupavzan, Detektiv Lakonogić (Detective Footlose), Homoquovadis and many others.

Maslovara also works on internationally licensed comics such as Il Grande Blek (Serbian: Veliki Blek), The Pink Panther (Pink Panter), Muppet Babies (Mapet Bebe), Felix the Cat (Mačak Feliks), Tom and Jerry (Tom i Džeri), Mickey Mouse (Miki Maus) etc.

== Biography ==
Maslovara finishes primary school and high school in Odžaci, his hometown. He moved to Novi Sad in 1967, where he graduated from the Higher Pedagogical School – the artistic direction.

As a student, he draws caricatures. He published his drawings from 1969 in the newspapers of Novi Sad: Veseli svet (The Happy World), Indeks (Index), Dnevnik (Journal) etc. His first comic series was published in 1971 in the Kuriri magazine of the publisher Dečje novine (Children's Journal), Gornji Milanovac. In the 1970s, he did animation and drew realistic gags and comics. After publishing the "Marko Kraljević" comic strip at Politikin Zabavnik in 1976, he devoted himself entirely to humorous comics. Since 1979, he lives in Gornji Milanovac, where he works for the publishing house "Dečje novine".

In 1979 with Milan Bukovac and Vojislav Ratković, he founded the artistic group FONS. In 1988, he became a member of the group of comics authors with Slaviša Ćirović, Brana Nikolić and Zdravko Zupan, with whom he worked on the international series "Yupi stars".

During the 1980s, he worked as a screenwriter and writer. He creates a series of heroes – Tupavzan, Fijuksi, Homoquovadis, Debli Krkojet, Detective Lakonogić, Barba Plima, Ungl Gungl, Zlatko, Plavuša (The Blonde), Kvadratko (Squarry), Darko, Bole & Đole...

He also works on licensed comics like Il Grande Blek, Pink Panther, Muppet Babies, Felix the Cat, Tom and Jerry, Mickey Mouse etc. He draws mainly according to his own scripts, but also according to the stories of other writers such as Miodrag Milanović (Barba Plima, 1981–1982), Lazar Odanović (Tom and Jerry, 1985–1986) and Brana Nikolić (Yupi Stars, 1988).

He writes scripts for the comics of Desimir Žižović Buin (Mirko and Slavko, an episode, 1984), Miodrag Žarić (a series Šušumige, 1985–1986), Milan Bukovac (Trapavzan, 1980) and Zdravko Zupan (Mickey and Baš-Čelik, 1999, Zuzuko, 2004, as well as Giga and Goga, 2004).

He publishes his comics in Serbian and Yugoslav magazines such as Politikin Zabavnik, YU strip, Biser strip, Strip zabavnik, Gigant, Eks almanah, Male novine, Kekec, Dečje novine, Dečji odmor, Cepelin, Finesa, Veliki Odmor, Munja strip etc., but also in Swedish, Finnish, British, Italian and other magazines.

After the bankruptcy of "Dečje novine" company in 1999, together with his colleagues Milorad Stevanović and Milovan Petković, he creates the publishing house "Den Art" and publishes children's magazines like Veliki odmor (Recess) and Zvrk (Spinner). Detective Lakonogić is published in 2013 as a complete series book by the publishing house "Rosenkrantz".

Maslovara's solo exhibitions take place in Odžaci in 1971, in Karlovac in 1973, in Novi Sad in 1974, in Gornji Milanovac in 1996 and in Kruševac in 2011. His drawings are exhibited on international group exhibitions: Athens, Zug, Montreal, Skopje, Sofia, Istanbul, Ljubljana, Berlin, Belgrade, Knokke-Heist, Novi Sad, Kruševac...

He won the first prize for best caricature "Icarus" (in Zemun, 1973), the third prize of the comic newspaper Kepes Ifjúság (in Novi Sad, 1978), the first prize of the newspaper Borba (in Belgrade, 1979), the third prize for comics in La Roque-d'Anthéron (in France, 1979), the first prize in the jazz drawing competition (in Belgrade, 1999), the first prize of the Cultural Center of Gornji Milanovac (in 1999), the first prize for caricature in the festival "Golden Helmet" (Zlatna kaciga, in Kruševac, 2010) etc.

Since 2002, he has taught art at the "Desanka Maksimović" elementary school in Gornji Milanovac until 2011, when he retires. Since 2007, he has directed the Small School of Animation in Kraljevo, which won two awards at the festival of children humor in Lazarevac in 2007 and 2008.

He married Mira and is the father of two children, Milan and Nada. He is a founding member of Association of Serbian Comics Creators.

== Critical reception ==
Detective Lakonogić (1986–1997)

- "Masli is a complete author, screenwriter and writer of Detective Lakonogić. His unmistakable sense of humor is at the forefront of his screenplay. His drawing is very recognizable. He is the master of the gag who manages to create the whole in a frame full of humor, so that the text in the bubble is not there to explain the scene, but it is there to mark even more the gag, this which is very much related to the way of working of a caricaturist " – Borisav Čeliković
- "In such a staging the concrete complications characterized by the subversion of Masli take the place — the bad guys appear most often and the good guys fall from the sky to spoil their plans. So, while justice always wins, the center of gravity is shifted to the unexpected side. The author gives even leading roles to side characters by opening new directions for a potential development of the series. Masli's drawing — as well as the whole concept of this series — is on the trail of the Franco-Belgian comic strip which, thanks to the humorous repetition, can be aimed at young readers as well as adults." — Ilija Bakić

Mickey Mouse and Baš Čelik (Miki i Baš Čelik, 1999)

- "Masli's script is full of wit and clear language, where the extraordinary motives of folk tales are merged with Disney's psychology. Zupan's drawing is elegant, made according to Disney's classic school rules, with a well-measured personal note. Mickey and Baš-Čelik is the best autochthonous Yugoslav Disneyana to date, an example of noble and timeless entertainment." – Zoran Stefanović

== Notes and references ==
=== Bibliography ===
- Đurić, Predrag. "Interview: Nikola Maslovara Masli", in: Zlatno doba vojvođanskog stripa (The Golden Age of Comics in Vojvodina), "Moro / Système Comics", Belgrade, 2016. (in Serbian)
- Zupan, Zdravko. Vek stripa u Srbiji (The Century of Comics in Serbia), Cultural Center — Gallery of Contemporary Art, Pančevo, 2007, pp. 73, 80, 85, 86, 88, 89, 99, 102, 108, 112, 115, 121, 122 and 136. (in Serbian)
- Ivkov, Slobodan. Biography, in: 60 godina domaćeg stripa u Srbiji (60 years of domestic comics in Serbia), Galerija likovnog susreta, Subotica, 1995, pp. 47, 71, 262. (in Serbian)
- Maslovara, Nikola, Comics and cartoons exhibition (catalog), Dani stripa (The comic book days), Gornji Milanovac, 1996. (in Serbian)
- Tamburić Živojin, Zdravko Zupan & Zoran Stefanović. Stripovi koje smo voleli: Izbor stripova i stvaralaca sa prostora bivše Jugoslavije u XX veku / The Comics We Loved: Selection of 20th Century Comics and Creators from the Region of Former Yugoslavia, "Omnibus", Belgrade, 2011, p. 131 et p. 257. (in Serbian)

=== External links ===
- Nikola Maslovara, Lambiek Comiclopedia (in English)
- An original page and a biography (in English)
- Bošnjak Milorad. "Nikola Maslovara: Sve je naglavačke" (interview), Večernje novosti, Belgrade, 15. février 2015. (in Serbian)
