= European comics =

Comics produced in Continental Europe

- Earliest publications: 19th century

European comics are comics produced in Europe. The comic album is a very common printed medium. The typical album is printed in large format, generally with high quality paper and colouring, commonly 24 cm × 32 cm (9.4 in × 12.6 in), has around 48–60 pages, but examples with more than 100 pages are common. While sometimes referred to as graphic novels, this term is rarely used in Europe, and is not always applicable as albums often consist of separate short stories, placing them somewhere halfway between a comic book and a graphic novel. The European comic genres vary from the humorous adventure vein, such as The Adventures of Tintin and Asterix, to more adult subjects like Tex Willer, Diabolik, and Thorgal.

== History ==
The roots of European on-paper comics date back to 18th century caricatures (mocking others styles or behaviors) by artists such as William Hogarth. The early 19th century Swiss artist Rodolphe Töpffer is regarded by many as the "father of the modern comic" and his publication Histoire de Mr. Vieux Bois (1837) is sometimes called the first "comic book".

Other precursors include illustrated picture books such as Wilhelm Busch's Max and Moritz (1865).

Franco-Belgian comics, Spanish comics, and Italian comics are historically amongst the dominant scenes of European comics.

Earlier, paintings depicting stories in sequential frames using descriptive text, were used in murals, one such example is written in Greek, dating to the 2nd century and found in Capitolias, today in Jordan.

== Festivals ==
A number of festivals celebrating comic art are held around Europe. These include:

- Amadora BD, Portugal
- Angoulême International Comics Festival, France
- Fumetto International Comics Festival, Lucerne, Switzerland
- Helsinki Comics Festival, Finland
- International Comics Festival "Salon stripa", Serbia
- International Festival of Comics and Games, Poland
- The Lakes International Comic Art Festival, Kendal, United Kingdom
- Lille Comics Festival, France
- Lucca Comics & Games, Italy
- Heroes Comic Con, Spain
- Salón Internacional del Comic, Spain

== See also ==
- British comics
- Croatian comics
- Czech comics
- Dutch Comics
- German comics
- Hungarian comics
- Polish comics
- Portuguese comics
- Serbian comics
