= International Comics Festival "Salon stripa" =

- Status: active
- Genre: Comics
- Venue: Building of Student Cultural Center
- Location: Belgrade
- Country: Serbia
- Inaugurated: 2003
- Organizer: Student Cultural Center, Belgrade
- Filing status: Non-profit
- Website: www.salonstripaskc.rs

International Comics Festival is an annual event organized and led by Belgrade’s Student Cultural Center (SKC). The Festival is the biggest comics event in Serbia, and one of the most important in the region. Each year, the Festival is being held during the last week of September (from Thursday to Sunday).

== Festival program ==
Festival is based on: the open international competition for authors of all ages from around the world, worldwide most important comic authors presentations with their personal appearances, revalorization of domestic comic scene from early beginning to present days, young talents recognition and support, popularization of comics and similar artistic expressions such as animation and illustration through the various exhibitions and educational programs.

== Guests of the festival ==
Brian Bolland (United Kingdom), Jean-Marc Thevenet (France), Adrian Smith (United Kingdom), Olivier Ledroit (France), John Higgins (United Kingdom), Igor Kordey (Croatia), David Lloyd (United Kingdom), Esad T. Ribić (Croatia), Matt Hollingsworth (USA), Gyorgy Palfi (Hungary), Kostas Aronis (Greece), Gregg Cox (USA), Aleksandar Sotirovski (Macedonia), Tihomir Tikulin (Croatia), Darijo Antunović (Croatia), Marko Šunjić (Croatia), Iztok Sitar (Slovenia), Bart Nauwelaerts (Belgium), Rufus Dayglo (United Kingdom), R.M. Guéra (Serbia/Spain), Enrique Sanchez Abuli (Spain), Marco Nizzoli (Italy), Luca Enoch (Italy), Paul Gravett (United Kingdom), Robert Crumb, Aline Kominsky-Crumb, Gilbert Shelton, Roberto Diso (Italy), Borivoj Dovniković (Croatia) Borivoj Dovniković, Manuele Fior, Moreno Burattini, Walter Venturi (Italy), Pat Moriarity (USA), Paolo Monteiro (Portugal), Bryan Talbot, Mary M. Talbot, Petar Meseldžija, Helena Klakocar, Nicolas Grivel, Dejan Nenadov, Olivier Dobremel, Toni Fejzula.

== Special Award for General Contribution to Serbian Comics ==
The most important domestic authors and comic book pioneers, well renowned beyond the Serbian borders, won the Festival life achievement award: Zoran Janjetov and Aleksandar Zograf (2004), Bane Kerac (2005), Željko Pahek (2006), Žika Bogdanović (2007), Srećko Jovanović (2008), Rajko Milošević Gera (2009), Novica Djukić (2010), Novica Kruljević (2011), Petar Radičević (2012), Lazo Sredanović (2013), Radivoj Bogičević (2014), Zdravko Zupan (2015), Gradimir Smudja (2016), Marko Stojanović (2017), Aleksa Gajić (2018).

== Festival contest (2003-2018) ==
In the first twelve years, over a 2000 authors from 58 countries worldwide including Serbia took part in the Festival comics contest. Among them, over 500 were in the "15 years of age or below" contest category. From 2003 to 2015, contestants represented following countries: Argentina, Australia, Austria, Belgium, Bosnia & Herzegovina, Brazil, Bulgaria, Canada, China, Columbia, Croatia, Cuba, Cyprus, Czech Republic, Ecuador, Egypt, Estonia, Finland, France, Hungary, Germany, Greece, India, Iran, Ireland, Israel, Italy, Japan, Latvia, Lebanon, Lithuania, Macedonia, Malaysia, Mexico, Moldova, Montenegro, Myanmar, Netherlands, Philippines, Poland, Portugal, Romania, Russia, Serbia, Singapore, Scotland, Slovakia, Slovenia, Spain, Sweden, Switzerland, Turkey, Ukraine, United Kingdom, Uruguay, USA, Uzbekistan, Vietnam.

Previous winners of the Festival contest were: Nebojša Cvetković (Serbia, 2003); Maja Veselinović (Serbia, 2004); Mijat Mijatović (Serbia, 2005); Miroslav Marić (Serbia, 2006); Siniša Banović / Dejan Vujić (Serbia, 2007); Alem Ćurin (Croatia, 2008); Marian Mirescu / Cristian Ioan Pacurariu (Romania, 2009); Tihomir Čelanović (Serbia, 2010); Marko Stojanović / Jovan Ukropina (Serbia, 2011); Aleksa Gajić (Serbia, 2012), Miloš Slavković (2013), Dragana Stojiljković and Dražen Kovačević (Serbia, 2014), Nenad Pejčić and Igor Krstić (Serbia, 2015), Daniele Giardini (Italy) and Jelena Đorđević (Serbia, 2016), Darko Macan and Fran Strukan (Croatia, 2017), Đorđe Milović (Serbia, 2018).
