= Željko Pahek =

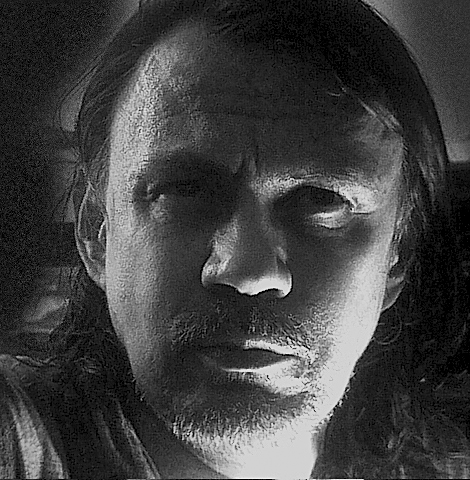
- Željko Pahek (2015)
- Born: Željko Pahek; 1954 (age 71–72) Županja, Yugoslavia
- Areas: Artist; Painter; Comics creator; Scriptwriter
- Notable works: "La Légion des imperméables" (aka "The Legion Of The Waterproof"), "Moby Dick", "Error data"

Željko Pahek (born 1954 in Županja, then in Yugoslavia, now in Croatia) is an internationally published comic-book and graphic novel creator, scriptwriter, painter, illustrator and caricaturist.

Since 1980s he is known for black humored comic series, as well as cover illustrations for masterpieces of science fiction and fantasy literature. He lives in Belgrade, Serbia.

== Biography ==
Pahek lives in Belgrade since 1978. He is one of the key founders of Beogradski krug 2, an important Yugoslav artistic group, together with Bojan M. Đukić (main founder), Vladimir Vesović, Zdravko Zupan, Askanio Popović, R. M. Guera, Dragan Savić, Dušan Reljić, Dragan Bosnić and others.

Since 1979 Pahek is publishing comics and illustrations in cultural journals and comic magazines in Yugoslavia, such as: Student, Vidici, Politikin Zabavnik, YU Strip, Stripoteka, Spunk novosti, Naš Strip, Strip mania...; and since 1986 in foreign magazines such as: Schwermetall (Germany), Fluide Glacial (France), L'Eternauta (Italy), Zone 84 (Spain), Tintin (Belgium), Eleftherotipia (Greece) and Heavy Metal Magazine (USA). His works are in "Heavy Metal Special Editions" for 15th, 20th and 35th anniversaries of the publication. His comic "Die schwarze narbam" ("Black Scars"), dedicated to the destruction of the Berlin Wall, was published in thirteen languages (international collection "Durch bruch", aka "Breakthrough", 1990).

He is notable for black humoured comic series "Astro-idjani" and "The Legion Of The Waterproof" and for numerous caricatures in magazines, republished in a collection Depilacija Mozga ("Removal of the Brain").

From 1982, wide Yugoslav audience knows Pahek also as a cover artist for science fiction and fantasy books from the writers such as Robert Heinlein, Philip K. Dick, Arthur C. Clarke, Douglas Adams, Terry Pratchett, Tim Powers and Slobodan Škerović.

He has also written scripts for D. Bosnić and D. Savić, and worked as a colorist for Hermann Huppen's acclaimed comics series — Jeremiah and The Towers of Bois-Maury.

== Critical reception ==
"In artists like Đorđe Milović, Željko Pahek and Zoran Tucić we have contemporary draughtsman of truly international calibre." – Paul Gravett

== Works (a choice) ==
=== Comics, graphic novels and caricatures ===
As the main creator

- Astro-iđani, Yugoslavia /Serbia/, 1981–1983.
- Once upon a time in the future, United States, 1991.
- Depilacija Mozga, Yugoslavia /Serbia/, 1997.
- Badi kukavica i druge priče, Yugoslavia /Serbia/, 2001.
- Moby Dick 1–2, France, 2005.
- 1300 kadrova, Bosnia and Herzegovina, 2014.
- Error Data (Chronicles by a Burnt Out Robot), England, 2016.
- La Légion des imperméables, France, 2016. (original title: "Legija nepromočivih"; int. title: "The Legion Of The Waterproof")

Anthologies and collections

- Durch Bruch, Germany, 1990. (also translated as: Breakthrough, Après le mur, Falomlás, Der var engang en mur, Murros: Rautaesirippu repeää...)
- 15 Years of Heavy Metal: The World's Foremost Illustrated Fantasy Magazine, USA, 1992.
- Signed by War — Getekend door de oorlog ("Potpisano ratom"), Netherlands, 1994.
- 20 Years of Heavy Metal, USA, 1997.
- Heavy Metal Magazine: 35th anniversary issue, USA, 2012.
- Balkan Comics Connections: Comics from the ex-YU Countries, United Kingdom, 2013.
- Odbrana utopije, Serbia, 2014.
- Sarajevski atentat, Bosnia and Herzegovina, 2016.

As the colorist

- Jeremiah, by Hermann Huppen
- The Towers of Bois-Maury, by Hermann Huppen

== Literature ==
- Zupan, Zdravko (2007). Vek stripa u Srbiji (in Serbian). Kulturni centar — Galerija savremene umetnosti, Pančevo.
- Ivkov, Slobodan. 60 godina domaćeg stripa u Srbiji (1935—1995), leksikon-katalog, Galerija „Likovni susret“, Subotica, 1995. E-edition: Projekat Rastko (in Serbian)
- Tamburić Živojin, Zdravko Zupan, Zoran Stefanović & Paul Gravett. The Comics We Loved: Selection of 20th Century Comics and Creators from the Region of Former Yugoslavia (a critical lexicon), "Omnibus", Beograd, 2011. (in English and Serbian)
- Tucakov, Anica. Strip u Srbiji 1975-1995, Zadužbina „Andrejević“, Beograd, 2000. (in Serbian)
