= International Festival of Comics =

International Festival of Comics or International Comics Festival may refer to:

- International Festival of Comics and Games, Poland
- Angoulême International Comics Festival, France
- Algiers International Comics Festival, Algeria
- Fumetto International Comics Festival, Switzerland
- International Comics Festival "Salon stripa", Serbia
