= Master of Death =

Publication information
- Publisher: Mikijevo carstvo (Yugoslavia)
- First appearance: November, 1939
- Created by: Đorđe Lobačev

In-story information
- Alter ego: Sir Reginald
- Abilities: Excellent athlete Highly skilled martial artist and marksman

Master of Death (Serbian: Gospodar smrti) was a Yugoslav adventure/fantasy comic strip about the masked hero of the same name, created by artist Đorđe Lobačev. Master of Death appeared in four stories published in comic magazine Mikijevo carstvo (Mickey's Kingdom) from 1939 to 1940. Master of Death is considered one of the most notable titles of the "Golden Age of Serbian Comics".

== History ==
Master of Death was created by artist Đorđe Lobačev. The first Master of Death story was published in comic magazine Mikijevo carstvo in November 1939. In his first adventure, the title character leaves to the front to help the wounded. Comic book artist and historian Zdravko Zupan and writer Slavko Draginčić described this as Lobačev's "personal resistance to war and its horrors".

Master of Death was published in sequels in Mikijevo carstvo throughout 1939 and 1940. Four Master of Death stories were published:

- "Gospodar smrti" (1939)
- "Gospodar smrti" (1939/1940)
- "Tajanstvena pustolovka" ("Mysterious Adventuress") (1940)
- "Avion smrti" ("Airplane of Death") (1940)

== Fictional character ==
The Master of Death story begins in 1217, in Scotland. A girl condemned to be burned at the stake lays a curse on the nobleman Sir Wilfred and the next 20 generations of his descendants. In 1939, Wilfred's descendant Sir Reginald is preparing his wedding, when, while passing the bridge on which the girl was burned seven centuries ago, his fiancée gets struck by lightning and dies. Reginald decides to leave the life of riches: he burns his castle down and takes an oath to spend the rest of his life fighting evil and protecting the innocent, wearing a mask of Death. With every good deed he lifts a part of the curse.
