= Zigomar =

Publication information
- Publisher: Mikijevo carstvo (Yugoslavia)
- First appearance: 28 May 1939
- Created by: Branko Vidić (writer); Nikola Navojev (artist)

In-story information
- Alter ego: Unknown
- Partnerships: Chi Yang
- Abilities: Excellent athlete Highly skilled martial artist and marksman Uses a tight-fitting costume for maneuverability

Zigomar was a Yugoslav adventure comic strip about the masked hero of the same name, created by artist Nikola Navojev and writer Branko Vidić. Zigomar appeared in six stories published in comic magazine Mikijevo carstvo (Mickey's Kingdom) from 1939 to 1941 and has been called one of the most notable titles of the "Golden Age of Serbian comics".

== Creation and publishing history ==
Zigomar was originally created by artist Nikola Navojev, a white émigré, and writer Branko Vidić. The biggest influence on Navojev and Vidić was the Phantom, but the two were also influenced by other masked heroes, like Lone Ranger, which appeared in Yugoslav comic magazines during the 1930s. Zigomar got his name from the more famous character of the same name, hero of pulp fiction novels written by French author Léon Sazie and silent films directed by Victorin-Hippolyte Jasset. Serbian comic book artist Aleksandar Zograf and comic book artist and historian Zdravko Zupan suggest that the idea to name the character after the more famous character from French literature and films might had come from the owner and editor of the comic magazine Mikijevo carstvo, Milutin S. Ignjačević, who studied filmmaking in Prague and Munich and was one of Yugoslavia's early filmmakers.

Zigomar first appeared in the 28th issue of the magazine Mikijevo carstvo, published on 28 May 1939. Navojev and Vidić were credited under pseudonyms, Navojev as Nick Woodly and Vidić as Brandon Vid. Zigomar episodes were published in sequels, with one or two pages of an episode per magazine issue. Until the Axis occupation of Yugoslavia, five more Zigomar stories were published in Mikijevo carstvo: "Zigomar protiv Fantoma" ("Zigomar versus the Phantom"), "Nevesta bogova" ("Bride of the Gods"), "Bič pravde" ("The Whip of Justice"), "Misterije Egipta" ("Mysteries of Egypt") and "Leteći Zigomar" ("Flying Zigomar"). "Misterije Egipta" was announced as "the last Zigomar story", due to Navojev's health condition. In 1940, Navojev died of tuberculosis. However, due to great popularity of Zigomar, Ignjačević decided to offer young artist Dušan Bogdanović to draw Zigomar, with Vidić continuing to write the script. The last Zigomar story, "Leteći Zigomar", was the only one drawn by Bogdanović. The occupation of Yugoslavia ended the publishing of Mikijevo carstvo and thus Zigomar, leaving the last Zigomar story unpublished in its entirety. The last Zigomar story was published in its entirety for the first time in 2008.

== Fictional character ==
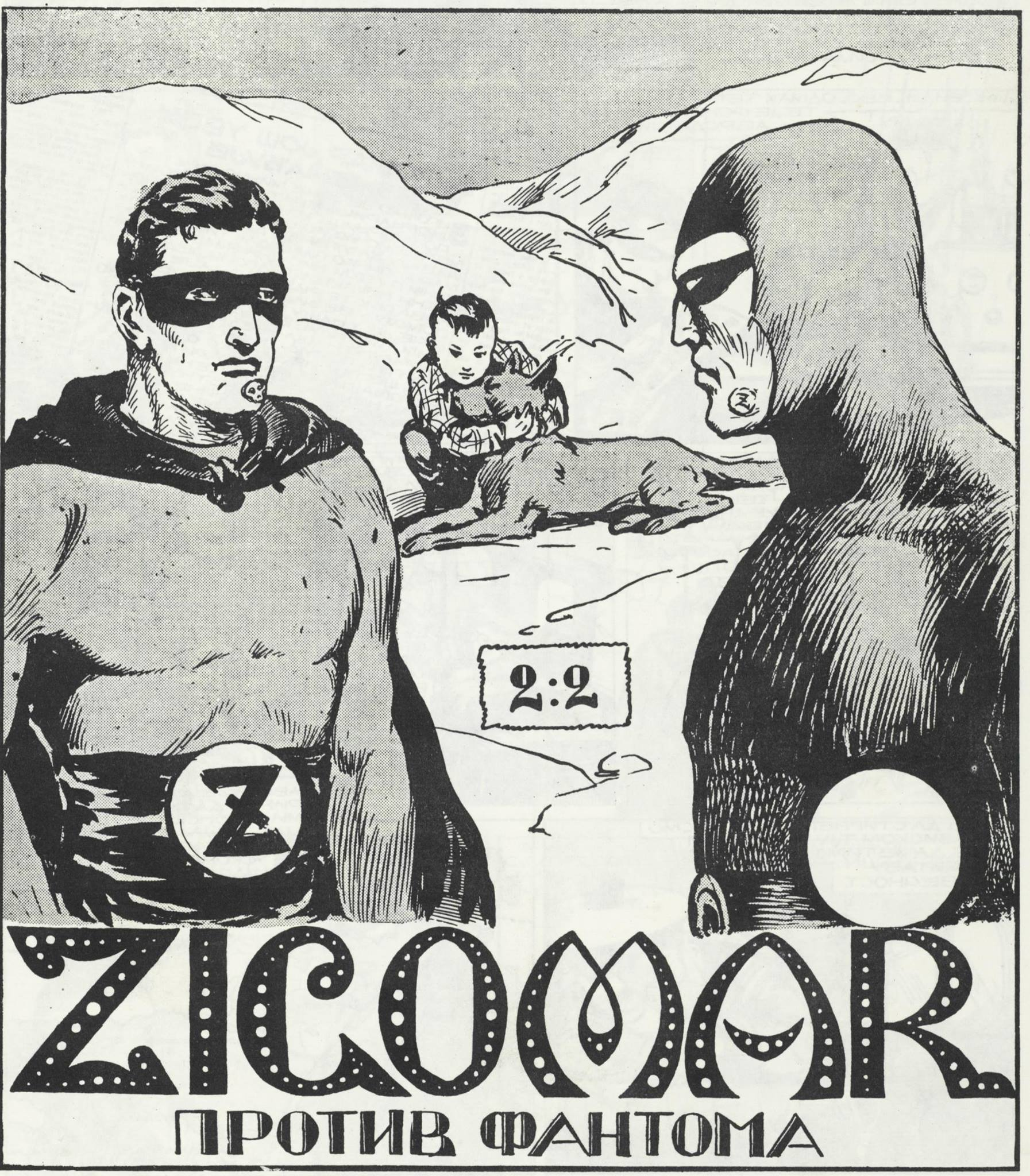
Cover of the "Zigomar protiv Fantoma" episode

Zigomar is a young man coming from a wealthy American family, who decided to leave the life of luxury and dedicate himself to fighting crime. Similar to the Phantom, Zigomar wears a mask and a tight costume, but, unlike the Phantom, he usually wears a cape. Zigomar, similar to the Phantom, has a "Z" sign on his belt and a ring with a "Z" sign on it. Just like the Phantom, Zigomar has no superpowers. On his journeys he is followed by his loyal sidekick, Chinese boy Chi Yang.

In one of his adventures, Zigomar meets the Phantom in the Himalayas. The two get into a fight, but soon after they show respect for each other and become friends. However, at one point, an evil fakir hypnotizes them and turns them against each other once again. The story continues with new clashes between the two heroes, until Zigomar sets captured Phantom free. The two part their ways, showing mutual respect but also animosity.

== Reprints and foreign releases ==
Before the Axis occupation of Yugoslavia, Zigomar Stories were reprinted in Plavi zabavnik, which was Mikijevo carstvo's publication, from 1939 to 1940. After World War II, Zigomar was reprinted in Yugoslav magazines Karavan ("Bič pravde", published in sequels during 1972), Pegaz ("Zigomar protiv Fantoma", published in two parts, in 1975) and Politikin Zabavnik ("Zigomar protiv Fantoma", published in two parts during 1989). In 2008, the story "Leteći Zigomar" was published in its entirety for the first time, as a comic album by Serbian publisher Stella. In 2010, the first Zigomar story was published as a comic album by Serbian publisher Komiko, as a part of their Zlatno doba srpskog stripa (Golden Age of Serbian Comics) series.

In 2012, the Cultural Centre of Pančevo published all Zigomar stories in the book Zigomar: Maskirani pravednik (Zigomar: Masked Fighter for Justice), edited by Zdravko Zupan. The book featured forewords by Zupan and Aleksandar Zograf, and Zupan's texts about Navojev, Vidić and Bogadnović.

Some of Zigomar stories were published in Bulgaria. By the assertions of Bulgarian comic book artist and historian Georgi Chepilov, Zigomar was published in Bulgarian comic magazines Rom strip and Kartinet sviat during 1941 and 1942.

The second Zigomar story, "Zigomar protiv Fantoma" was published in sequels in Brazilian magazine Suplemento Juvenil during 1942. In the 1970s, the story was published in Italy by the publisher Club Anni Trenta, as a part of the Phantom series. "Zigomar protiv Fantoma" was also published in Argentina, in the magazine Ra-Ta-Plán, and in Australia, in Phantom #1763, an 80th anniversary special issue of The Phantom.

== Popularity and legacy ==
During its original run, Zigomar was well-received by Yugoslav readers: all the copies of Mikijevo carstvo issue with the beginning of the first Zigomar story were sold out immediately, and the interest was so large that the magazine editors offered to send the part of the magazine with Zigomar to the readers which did not manage to get a copy without charge.

In the 1970s, "Zigomar protiv Fantoma" saw large attention by The Phantom fans in the United States. During the decade, Belgrade lawyer Dragiša Jovović, a comic book collector and The Phantom fan, got in touch with Ed Rhoades, the president of the American Phantom fan club. Jovović sent issues of The Phantom published in Yugoslavia to Rhoades, and at one point sent him a copy of "Zigomar protiv Fantoma". Jovović stated: "When the Phantom fan club received the copy, it caused a real sensation. They immediately held a meeting of the presidency, probably by phone. Ed later asked me about the artist, and said that his drawings were exquisite." There are, however, no records of the official release of the story in the United States.

A number of works by Serbian painter Uroš Đurić were inspired by Zigomar.
