= Zigomar (disambiguation) =

Zigomar was a Serbian adventure comic strip created in 1939 by Nikola Navojev and Branko Vidić.

Zigomar may also refer to:

- Zigomar (film), a 1911 French film based on the stories of Léon Sazie and directed by Victorin-Hippolyte Jasset
- Zigomar, an alias for a character in the Filipino film Tatlong Baraha
