= Generation Tesla =

- Cover of the first issues of Generation Tesla, featuring (clockwise) Saw, Cybernaut and Solar

Group publication information
- Publisher: Luxor Strip
- First appearance: Generacija Tesla No. 1 (Oct. 1995)
- Created by: Milan Konjević (writer); Siniša Radović (artist); Zdravko Zupan (artist)

In-story information
- Type of organization: Team
- Agent(s): Cybernaut; Saw; Solar; Portal; Vincha; Barbra; Misha

Generation Tesla
- Creator(s): Milan Konjević (writer); Siniša Radović (artist); Zdravko Zupan (artist)

Generation Tesla (Serbian: Generacija Tesla) was a Serbian comic book about a superhero team of the same name, created by writer Milan Konjević and artists Siniša Radović and Zdravko Zupan. The series was started in 1995, and a total of eight issues were published before the comic was cancelled.

== History ==
Generation Tesla was started in 1995, by the publisher Luxor Strip. The comic represented one of the biggest attempts to revive the comic scene in Serbia after the breakup of Yugoslavia. The stories were written by Milan Konjević, penciled by Siniša Radović and inked by Zdravko Zupan.

The first issues were published together with another Luxor Strip comic, Borci sumraka (Twilight Fighters), and were later sold separately. A total of eight issues were published, until the comic was canceled due to distribution problems.

== Characters ==
=== Nikola Tesla ===
Nikola Tesla, one of the greatest scientist in history, the founder of Generation Tesla, who has evaded his own death by transferring himself to another plane of existence. He resurrected a number of humans slain by the evil Kobalt, transforming them into super humans who could counter the threats of such villains.

=== Generation Tesla ===
==== Cybernaut ====
Cybernaut's real name is Peter Tešić. After him and his wife Barbra Ryan were murdered by Kobalt, they were resurrected by Nikola Tesla. Peter became a cyborg, able to fly and fire beams of energy from his wrist gauntlets. Parts of his body are protected by armor, and on his left shoulder he carries a large calibre weapon.

==== Saw ====
Saw's real name is Mladen Janković. He is a former circus performer. He is also a cyborg, able to transform his hands into chainsaw-like blades.

==== Solar ====
Solar's real name is Steve Ryan. He is Barbra Ryan's brother and Peter Tešić's (Cybernaut's) brother-in-law. Solar can fly and generate bolts of energy from his hands.

==== Portal ====
Portal's real name is Kolja Ivanović. Portal, was, like the other Generation Tesla members, resurrected by Nikola Tesla, but he uses gun as a weapon and it remains unclear what superpower if any he has.

==== Vincha ====
Vincha (her name referring to the Vincha culture) is an ancient warrior resurrected by Nikola Tesla.

==== Barbra ====
Barbra Ryan is a pilot, Peter Tešić's (Cybernaut's) wife and Steve Ryan's (Solar's) sister.

==== Misha ====
Misha is Portal's younger brother and a later addition to the team. He has the power to manipulate virtual reality.

Misha is the only Generation Tesla character to appear in Factor 4, a comic set in the same universe but 60 years into the future. In this comic Misha is an old man hooked up to a computer.

=== Marko Nemir ===
Doctor Marko Nemir ("nemir" means disturbance in Serbian) is an adventurer and an ally of Generation Tesla.

A special issue about Marko Nemir was almost finished but never released.

=== Kobalt ===
Kobalt is a supervillain, and Generation Tesla's main opponent.
