= The Thread of Art =

2012 graphic novel

- The cover of volume 1 of the French edition

Publication information
- Publisher: Delcourt (France); System Comics (Serbia)
- Publication date: 2012 (Volume 1); 2015 (Volume 2)

Creative team
- Written by: Ivana Smudja
- Artist: Gradimir Smudja

The Thread of Art (French: Au fil de l'Art, Serbian: Nit umetnosti) is a graphic novel created by Serbian artist Gradimir Smudja and his daughter Ivana Smudja. The novel was originally published in French in two volumes, in 2012 and 2015.

== Creation and publication history ==
The script for the novel was written by Gradimir Smudja's daughter Ivana, an art historian. Gradimir Smudja dedicated the graphic novel to Aleksa Čelebonović, his professor of art history on the Belgrade Faculty of Applied Arts.

The Thread of Art was originally published in France by Delcourt, in two volumes, the first one appearing in 2012 and the second in 2015. In Serbia it was published by System Comics, in a single 200-page volume, in 2015. In Serbia the novel was also published in sequels in Politikin Zabavnik magazine.

== Story ==
Teenage girl Luna and her anthropomorphic cat Vincent (who originally appeared as a character in Gradimir Smudja's 2003 graphic novel Vincent and Van Gogh) are spending a day outdoors, where Vincent is posing for Luna's drawings. After running across the field, the two trip over a red thread and fall into a cave. They find themselves in the Lascaux Cave, where they meet a prehistoric man who created its famous wall paintings. From there, following the red thread, Luna and Vincent travel through space and time, meeting some of the greatest artists in the history of mankind. The story consists of 21 chapters, each one opening with a biography (or biographies) of the artist(s) met by Luna and Vincent in the chapter:

- Leonardo da Vinci
- Michelangelo
- Albrecht Dürer
- Pieter Bruegel the Elder
- Peter Paul Rubens
- Diego Velázquez
- El Greco
- Rembrandt
- Johannes Vermeer
- Jean-Antoine Watteau
- Francisco Goya
- Jacques-Louis David
- J. M. W. Turner
- Hokusai
- Théodore Géricault and Eugène Delacroix
- The Impressionists and Post-Impressionists (Claude Monet, Édouard Manet, Pierre-Auguste Renoir, Edgar Degas, Henri de Toulouse-Lautrec, Paul Cézanne, Georges Seurat)
- Vincent van Gogh
- Gustav Klimt and Egon Schiele
- René Magritte
- Edvard Munch
- Pablo Picasso

During the story, Luna and Vincent find themselves in surreal situations, often helping the artists they meet complete their famous works or get out of trouble, meeting various historical figures that artists portrayed or that had some influence over artists' work, like Marie de' Medici, Louis XIV, and Jean-Paul Marat. Salvador Dalí appears briefly in the chapter in which Luna and Vincent meet René Magritte.

After meeting Picasso in Nazi-occupied Paris, Luna and Vincent take him to see the paintings in Lascaux Cave. It is revealed that the prehistoric man who painted them was Picasso's ancestor. After taking a train with Picasso to Gare d'Orsay railway station, Luna and Vincent wake up in the Musée d'Orsay in the present day. Luna tells what she dreamed about to a museum guard, who tells her that she is not the first to tell him something like that and that Musée d'Orsay is a place of magic. Upon exiting the museum, Luna and Vincent once again see the red thread.

== Style ==
Through the graphic novel, Smudja pays tribute to the great artists by reproducing their famous works or painting people and objects presented on them from different perspective.

In a 2015 interview, Smudja stated that he wanted to include Serbian painter Sava Šumanović and Russian painter Ilya Repin into the novel, but eventually did not do so because the novel was conceived as a small history of West European art.

== Critical reception ==
The graphic novel was excellently received by critics and readers in France and Belgium.
