= Borivoje Grbić =

Serbian comic-book and graphic novel creator

- Born: Borivoje Grbić; January 21, 1972 (age 54) Belgrade, Yugoslavia
- Areas: Artist; Writer
- Notable works: Faktor 4, Munja, Vekovnici

Borivoje "Bora" Grbić (Serbian Cyrillic: Боривоје Грбић, born January 21, 1972, in Belgrade) is a Serbian comic-book and graphic novel creator, known best for his comics "Faktor 4" (written by Milan Konjević), "Munja" (written by Zoran Stefanović and Zdravko Zupan), "Mobijeva kopilad" (written by Bojan Milojević - "Asterian") and other comics for "Šlic" magazine, as well as "Vekovnici" (written by Marko Stojanović).

He is co-founder and the general secretary of the Association of Serbian comics artists (Serbian: Udruženje stripskih umetnika Srbije).

He was the bassist of the Belgrade rock bands "Viborg Dallas and "Vien lur" (formerly the "Delta 99"), now playing in "Dekoder".
