= Božidar Milojković =

Serbian artist

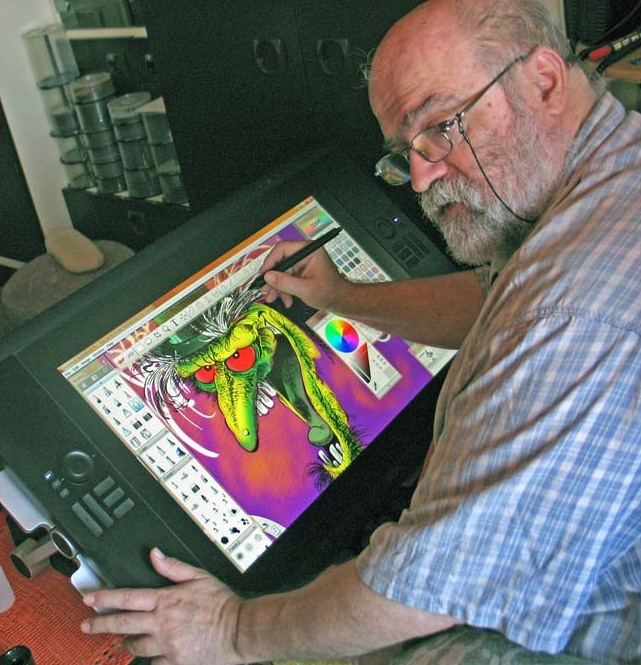
- Born: Božidar Milojković; 28 December 1952 (age 73) Sremska Mitrovica, Yugoslavia
- Areas: Artist; Cartoonist; Writer;
- Notable works: comics: Acidités de couleur noire (France), Paceri and Super paceri (Yugoslavia).

Božidar Milojković alias BAM (Serbian Cyrillic: Божидар Милојковић БАМ; born 28 December 1952) is a Serbian cartoonist, comic book and comic strip artist, illustrator and scriptwriter. He garnered acclaim in Yugoslavia and abroad under the pseudonym BAM.

== Biography ==
He was born in Sremska Mitrovica, and grew up in Belgrade. He debuted in Yugoslav cartooning industry in 1975, later becoming a member of "Beogradski krug 2" artistic group.

His notable works include Acidités de couleur noire, with Dragan de Lazare and Lazar Odanović, and "Paceri". He lives in Belgrade.
