= Dikan =

Yugoslav and Serbian comic strip

- Dikan, the titular character of the comic

Publication information
- Publisher: Politikin Zabavnik
- First appearance: 19 April 1969
- Created by: Nikola Lekić (concept); Lazo Sredanović (artist)

In-story information
- Partnerships: Vukoje
- Abilities: Enormous strength

Dikan (Serbian Cyrillic: Дикан) is a Yugoslav and Serbian comic strip. The comic follows the adventures of the title character and his uncle Vukoje as they travel the Balkans before the Slavic migrations. The characters encounter historical figures, as well as guest stars. Its tone is humorous. Created in 1969 by Nikola Lekić and Lazo Sredanović and published in Politikin Zabavnik, it was a popular comic strip in Yugoslavia during the 1970s. Twenty four issues were published between 1969 and 2014. Dikan is now a popular culture icon in Serbia. It was also featured in other media; as a mascot of Politikin Zabavnik and the 1993 Belgrade Marathon. It was given its own postage stamp in 2009.

== Plot ==
The comic strip follows Dikan, a Slav warrior, and his older companion and uncle Vukoje. Set mostly in the Balkans before the Slavic migrations, the series combines historical settings with comedy and satire. During their travels, the characters encounter different tribes, rulers, and historical figures, often becoming involved in conflicts, quests, and misunderstandings. Its tone is humorous and anachronistic and its stories contain satire, wordplay, and references to the modern society. In some episodes, Dikan also featured guest stars, such as Mića Orlović, Milivoj Jugin, Pavle Vuisić, and Čkalja, while in others, Dikan and Vukoje are featured in older and newer periods of human history. Dikan also owns a horse Hopodromkozonijus or Zokan and has a love interest, Vesna.

== History ==
Before the creation of Dikan, there were few popular comic strips in Yugoslavia, with Mirko and Slavko being the only prominent one. Dikan was created by Nikola Lekić and Lazo Sredanović. Lekić was the writer while Sredanović was the artist. The first episode, "Buzdovanske igre", was published on 18 April 1969 in the 903rd issue of Politikin Zabavnik. Before the first episode was published, Politikin zabavnik, under Lekić, shifted from a newspaper to a magazine design in 1968. Lekić also had an idea of creating a comic strip based on Asterix for the Yugoslav audience. Lekić sought advice from several writers about the main character whose initial name was Bikan. At one meeting, Sredanović's art received the most praise, who was relatively unknown at the time. Before working on Dikan, Sredanović (born 1939) worked on several comic strips during his youth. He was heavily influenced by Walt Disney and pre–World War II comic strips. The translator Krinka Vitorović then suggested that the name of the main character should be changed to Dikan. The issues of Politikin Zabavnik that featured Dikan were published in hundreds of thousands of copies, with one source suggesting 500,000 copies. In the comic, Dikan was portrayed as a tough character of the Prince Marko type, but also as an emotional character. On the other hand, Vukoje was portrayed as a smart character.

Lekić was the editor-in-chief of Politikin zabavnik until 1973, though he remained a writer for Dikan. Over the years, other writers included Ninoslav Šibalić, Milenko Maticki, Branko Đurica, and Slobodan Ivkov. They had little to no experience in writing comic strips. In 1973, Politikin Zabavnik started being published in Slovene; Dikan was there known as Tilen. No issues of Dikan were published between 1983 and 1993. After 2004, its writer was Sredanović. The last issue, "Đavolja Varoš", was published in 2014; 24 issues were published in total since 1969.

In 2007, the Belgrade-based publisher Everest Media, alongside comic strip writers, began working on the Kompletni Dikan u četiri knjige ('Complete Dikan in Four Books') collection of books. The first volume, containing first 11 issues, was published in 2013. The issues were digitally restored and recoloured. Various journalists, historians, and artists helped on the collection, including Zdravko Zupan, a historian on Yugoslav comic strips, and Zefirino Grasi, the then-editor-in-chief of Politikin Zabavnik. The first volume was promoted at events in Serbia and Montenegro. The second book, published in late 2015, contains comic strips published from 1971 to 1983. As of 2022, the other two books are still in production.

Dikan celebrated its 50th anniversary at the international comic strip conference Gašin sabor in 2019; Sredanović was one of the presenters at the event. Similar events took place in Belgrade, Banja Luka, Niš, Herceg Novi, Valjevo, and Leskovac. Sredanović died in October 2022. In 2023, Dikan was presented in the Museum of Comic Strips in Brussels.

== Reception and legacy ==
The comic strip author Iztok Sitar said that during his youth, Dikan would often be overly told within friend groups and that they would be "dying from laughter" (umirali od smeha), noting that the same was later done with Alan Ford. The magazine Vreme called Dikan "one of the most authentic comic strip heroes" (jednog od najatuentičnijih strip heroja) from Yugoslavia. Sredanović noted that one journalist compared Dikan's looks to Hägar the Horrible despite Dikan being four years older. The magazine Oblakoder compared it to Asterix, describing its humour as "sharp and far-reaching" (britak i dalekosežan). Filip Stojanovski of Global Voices wrote that Dikan reminds him that "we were all descendants of immigrants" (da smo svi mi potomci nekih migranata) amidst the European migrant crisis.

Dragan Stošić of the newspaper Danas wrote that Dikan was one of the most popular comic strips in Yugoslavia, alongside Mirko and Slavko. It was read by millions in Serbo-Croatian and Slovene in the 1970s. Dikan received its prominence during the peak of Politikin zabavnik's popularity, though Saša Rakezić of Vreme said that the strip remained popular even in the 2010s. Rakezić added that Dikan remains part of Serbia's popular culture and nostalgia.

Dikan was also featured in other media. It became the mascot of Politikin Zabavnik, the Belgrade Marathon in 1993, and on the 70th anniversary of Politikin Zabavnik in 2009, Dikan was featured on a postage stamp. Dikan was also featured in an advertisement for a kvass drink. An animated television series based on the comic strip was once in development; Sredanović took part in its development.
