= Prijatelji =

Serbian humorous comic book series

Publication information
- Publisher: Prijatelji Comics group, Shlitz Comics
- First appearance: Svakoj (h)rani šake soli dosta (2006)
- Created by: Marko Todosijević (Mrvax); Vladimir Petković (Vlapet); Tihomir Kostić (Kovenant)

Prijatelji (English: Goffies /ˈɡuː.fi~es/) is a humorous comic book series published in Serbia. Originally funded by Marko Todosijević (Mrvax) in 2005 in Belgrade, Serbia, from 2006 to 2012 it was supported by the Shlitz Comics group with additional support from the Šumatovčka art school.

== Information ==
Prijatelji is a Serbian comedic comic book series about characters created by its main author, Marko Todosijević which originally ran from 2006 to 2009, followed by a two-year hiatus. In 2011, the series was re-launched in cooperation with Vladimir Petković and later on with Tihomir Kostić.

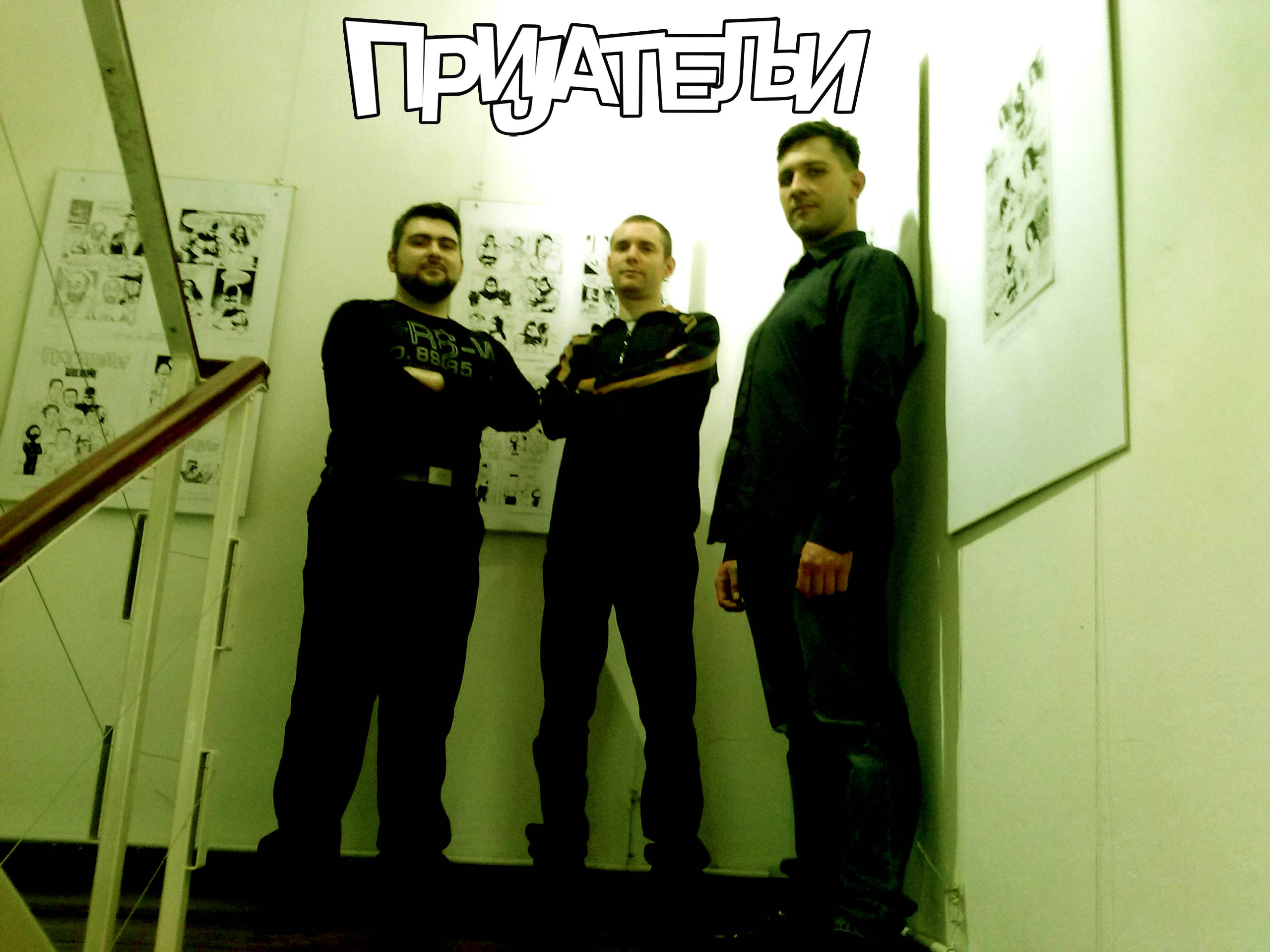
Authors of the serial: Kostić, Todosijević, Vlapet ©2013

== Publication history ==
Prijatelji's creation began with Todosijević working on the short comic strip, Zvuci Rodnog Kraja, ('The sounds of Hometown) in 2003. It was a strip-based and short-lived series consisting of two issues. Most of the material was accidentally destroyed, and only a couple of panels still exist in physical form. The series followed the happenings at a tavern called Zvuci Rodnog Kraja (The sounds of Hometown'), and the only resemblance to Prijatelji was a character named Vukota Šiljić. This character was different than that of the same name in Prijatelji, but it opened the way for the creation of Prijatelji. Scriptwriter Marko Radovanović (Maré) also contributed. A year later, the series was turned down, and Todosijević began to work on new characters and a concept that would later be known as Prijatelji. During the production of the concept and characters, Todosijević took inspiration from people he knew, as some of the characters were caricatures of actual people.

Influences from film, and comedies in particular, made quite an impact on Prijatelji. Jackie Chan's movies and Monty Python's Flying Circus had strong effects on the creation of the series. Additionally, domestic Serbian movies including Balkanski Špijun, Varljivo leto '68, Maratonci trče počasni krug, Kad porastem biću Kengur, and Sedam i po also had an influence.

=== 2006 ===
Mrmi and Zombiša as they first appeared in Svakoj (h)rani šake soli dosta (2006).

In 2006, the first characters were created. The first were an albino zombie named Zombiša, a dog-groundhog hybrid named Mrmi, followed by Nindža Nidža, Dule Student, and a jelly belly creature named Zglavko. These five characters are the heart of the series and their personalities and appearances underwent minor changes through the years. The series deviated from other comics, as the characters had more animosity towards each other than sympathy and friendly intentions, despite the name, which translated to "pals". In the original print of the first issue Svakoj (h)rani šake soli dosta, there were only five characters. The publication's moderate success and joining Shlitz Comics led to a reprint in 2007, which was filled with new pages and one new character.

=== 2007 ===
In 2007, when the first issue of Prijatelji was reprinted, the character of Mile Betmen was added. He was a parody of DC Comics' Batman, with a big beer belly and the role of masked avenger and pig farmer. When the second issue of Prijatelji appeared the same year, entitled Harmonija u zemlji bedaka, the series showed improvement, both in drawing style and storytelling, with its cast of characters expanding. Female characters were also brought in, and the series began to touch on more emotional themes; the clashes and animosity featured in the first issue were still present but crafted with more taste and moderation.

=== 2008–2009 ===
Vukota Šiljić and Nindža Nidža in an action scene from Osasuna VS Calgary ('Osasuna vs. Calgary') (2009).'

2008 was a quiet year as Todosijević searched for new ideas. The preparation of the new issue lasted over a year. In March 2009, the third issue, entitled Osasuna VS Calgary ('Osasuna vs. Calgary') was published. In this issue, besides Todosijević's work, Bojan Milojević (Asterian) contributed with one panel with Nindža Nidža on the back cover. As there was more than enough prepared material, a couple of months later another issue entitled Nema tata para sine was published. It featured 27 pages and artistic contributions from Serbian comic artists Saša Arsenić, Miloš Slavković and Borivoje Grbić.

After the release of this issue, due to personal issues, Todosijević ceased work on Prijatelji.

=== 2011–2012 ===
Mačo Mikula in the scene from the issue Naseči mi 'leba i parizer na koso (2012).

Two years later, Todosijević decided to begin work on Prijatelji again, this time with Vladimir Petković. The result was a special issue of Prijatelji, which was published in April, 2012. Besides the previous main characters, this special publication brought new characters like Radojka, Stamena and Mitar Tuki Trgovac, and announced a crazy new character named Mačo Mikula. Also, in comparison to older issues, this special had titles for the gags and was published in a bigger format.

After the release and promotion of this special issue, Todosijević and Petković joined forces with old friend Tihomir Kostić and began to work on an improved approach to Prijatelji, which demanded some changes and cuts. The character of Mile Betmen, the aforementioned parody of DC's Batman was phased out and replaced with Mačo Mikula, who became the main character. At some point, Mile Betmen and Mačo Mikula were supposed to work together, but the idea was quickly dropped. The second character reworked was Mrmi; from a lovable scamp, Mrmi became a sexually voracious and aggressively crazed character. The surroundings and plot were also reworked. All of the characters faced real-life situations, social injustice and problems, more connections and interactions, alcohol, women, and other issues in today's society. The new authors also inserted a number of new characters and sought to improve the situations, and the series itself.

The three authors decided to make a second volume, primarily because of the changes and new characters that were introduced. The special issue Porodični Paket/Extreme Paket (Specijalni broj) ('Family Pack/Extreme Pack (Special issue)') became a turning point in the series and the bridge to a new publication. It was considered the first issue of volume two. The next issue under Number 2 appeared under the title of Naseči mi 'leba i parizer na koso and was published in late November, 2012.

=== 2013 ===
During the summer of 2013, the creators entirely changed the series' concept. New episodes were on the way, and opposite to earlier issues, the new edition of Prijatelji under the working title Daj...daj...'armonike! would bring longer and more layered stories, filled with themes of the supernatural, horror, action, martial arts, and more detailed storytelling. In August 2013, an additional member was added to the crew, colorist Momir Marković. Besides a plan for the comic to be published in print, the creators also planned to publish special issues online in color, and in additional languages, such as Italian and English.

== Style and approach ==
The drawing style in Prijatelji is reminiscent of the Italian (Fumetti) school, French Bande dessinee elements and Matt Groening's approach, but yet original. While Todosijević's style is similar to the Simpsons and André Franquin, Petković's work features influences from Roberto Raviola, Roberto Diso and Fabio Civitelli. Kostić takes his approach from artists like Eduardo Risso, Kenichi Sonoda, Nicola Mari and early Enrico Marini. Regarding writing, all three of the authors take ideas and inspiration from their own inner sources. Music also has an influence on Prijatelji, but only as a background element.

== Setting ==
The world of Prijatelji is set in the city of Šiljino Brdo (English: 'Nibs Hill'), which is located somewhere in Serbia. The main places characters meet are dark alleys, DJ Sarma's flat, or a tavern called Tri Leša ('Three Corpses') owned by Rista Turista.

== Concept ==
Situations present in the series include the problems of today's world, misfortunes or joys, socially depraved situations, sex, violence, sport, love, hate, alcohol, music, and injustice. Dark and light humor are mixed together and can be seen in one panel at the same time, likewise love, hate or violence. In addition to chaos, there is critique of trashy people and their way of life. Occasional song lyrics mockingly appear from Serbian genres such as turbo folk and folk-pop. Themes dealing with the supernatural, aliens, and ancient myths are also present.

== Trivia ==
In May 2012, a slide show animation of Prijatelji was created based on the episode Radojka Phenomenon from Porodični Paket/Extreme Paket (Specijalni broj) ('Family Pack/Extreme Pack (Special issue)'). Both Todosijević and Petković, have appeared in the short psycho-thriller Sanctuary. Unofficially, in video clip form, Prijatelji covered the song Karate Kara te from Serbian hardcore/crossover band Sick Mother Fakers with illustrations from the issues.

== Characters ==
Main

- Mačo Mikula "Mikula" – main character (2011–present)
- Zombiša "Zombiša" – main character (2006–present)
- Nindža Nidža "Nidža" – main character (2006–present)
- Dule Student "Dule" – main character (2006–present)
- Mrmi "Mrmi" – main character (2006–present)
- Zglavko "Zglavko" – main character (2006–present)
- Vukota Šiljić "Vukota" – main character (2008–present)
- Vanesa Plavuša "Vanesa" – main character (2008–present)
- Fantastični Dragan "Dragan" – main character (2012–present)
- Gojko Grobar "Gojko" – main character (2012–present)
- Kung fu Romi "Petrit, Muharem, Kismet" – main character (2012–present)

Supporting

- DJ Sarma "Sarma" – supporting character (2007–present)
- Radojica "Radojica" – supporting character (2007–present)
- Čobanica Anđa "Anđa" – supporting character (2008–present)
- Lidija Plavuša "Lidija" – supporting character (2008–present)
- Radojka "Radojka" – supporting character (2011–present)
- Stamena "Stamena" – supporting character (2011–present)
- Ovan Zuba "Zuba" – supporting character (2008–present)
- Milorad Bjelogrlić Kojo "Milorad" – supporting character (2012–present)
- Rista Turista "Rista" – supporting character (2012–present)

Occasional

- Prgavi Džeki "Džeki" – occasional character (2007–present)
- Krmak Groki "Groki" – occasional character (2008–present)

Minor

- Mitar Tuki Trgovac "Mitar" – minor character (2011–present)
- Mečka Silvana "Silvana" – minor character (2012–present)

Villains

- Veverac "Veverac" – villain (2012–present)
- Dr. Sidrigajlo "Sidrigajlo" – villain (2012–present)
- Boško Muha "Bosko" – villain (2012–present)
- Jelisaveta "Jelisaveta" – villain (2012–present)
- Katćuša "Katćuša" – villain' (2012–present)
- Gospodin Ramadani "Ramadani" – villain (2013–present)
- Manga Mandov "Mandov" – villain (2013–present)

Discontinued

- Mile Betmen "Mile" – discontinued character (2007–2012)

=== Timeline ===
Timeline of characters' appearances throughout the years:

Timeline

== Released issues (bibliography) ==
List of published comic books in the Prijatelji ('Pals') series:

Prijatelji Comics group	Number of pages	Year	Color
Svakoj (h)rani šake soli dosta	26 pages	2006	Black and white
Harmonija u zemlji bedaka	26 pages	2007	Black and white
Osasuna VS Calgary (Osasuna vs. Calgary)	20 pages	2009	Black and white
Nema tata para sine	36 pages	2009	Black and white
Porodično Pakovanje/Extreme Paket (Specijalni broj) (Family Pack/Extreme Pack (Special issue))	24 pages	2012	Black and white
Naseči mi 'leba i parizer na koso	40 pages	2012	Black and white
Daj...Daj...'armonike! (working title)	unknown	TBA	Unknown

== Prijatelji authors ==
- Marko Todosijević(2003–present)
- Vladimir Petković(2011–present)
- Tihomir Kostić(2012–present)

== Staff (Prijatelji creative team ) ==
- Ownership: Prijatelji Comics group
- Series creator: Marko Todosijević
- Series co-creators: Vladimir Petković, Tihomir Kostić
- Artwork: Marko Todosijević, Vladimir Petković, Tihomir Kostić
- Illustrators: Marko Todosijević, Vladimir Petković, Tihomir Kostić
- Scripts, text and concept: Marko Todosijević, Tihomir Kostić, Vladimir Petković
- Character creators: Marko Todosijević, Vladimir Petković, Tihomir Kostić
- Web editors: Vladimir Petković, Marko Todosijević
- Magazine design: Marko Todosijević

Additional associates

- Illustrator and cover designer: Mrvax
- Magazine designer, and occasional illustrator:
- Colorist: Momir Marković

Tech crew

- Media relations and organization: Vladimir Petković
