= Mirko and Slavko =

Yugoslav comic book series (1958-1979)

- Mirko (right) and Slavko (left)
- Author: Desimir Žižović "Buin"
- Original title: Mirko i Slavko
- Illustrator: Desimir Žižović "Buin"
- Country: Yugoslavia
- Language: Serbo-Croatian
- Genre: Action; War
- Publisher: Dečje novine
- Published: 1958 - 1979

Mirko and Slavko (Serbo-Croatian: Mirko i Slavko) was a Yugoslav comic book series about two Partisan couriers, started in 1958 and ended in 1979. The creator and the main author of the series was artist Desimir Žižović "Buin". During the 1960s and early 1970s, Mirko and Slavko was the most popular comic in Yugoslavia, becoming the only Yugoslav comic to be adapted into a live action film during the existence of the country. In the mid-1970s the comic's popularity heavily declined and it was discontinued at the end of the decade.

== Background and history ==
The creator of Mirko and Slavko, Desimir "Buin" Žižović (1920-1996), was born in the village of Gornji Branetići, Serbia (at the time part of Kingdom of Serbs, Croats, and Slovenes). He spent most of World War II as a member of the Chetniks movement. There are different accounts about the circumstances of his joining the Chetniks: according to some, he joined the Chetniks voluntarily, while according to others, he was recruited against his will. It is certain that he spent some time under the command of Ljubo Novaković, before he was spotted by Dragiša Vasić, who sent him to work for the illegal newspaper Ravnogorski borac (Ravna Gora Fighter) as an illustrator. At the very end of the war, Žižović joined the Yugoslav Partisans. After the end of the war, he returned to his native village, where he painted and sculpted. For a period of time he worked as a designer in Titoplastika, a factory that produced packages for various products. He was spotted by Dečje novine editor-in-chiefs Srećko Jovanović as a self-taught, but talented artist, and got an opportunity to create illustrations for various Dečje novine publications for children.

In the late 1950s, Dečje novine started publishing a series of historical comics entitled Nikad robom (Never a Slave). The series featured heroic stories from the history of South Slavic people: stories from Croatian–Slovene peasant revolt, First and Second Serbian Uprising, World War I etc. In the late 1950s, Dečje novine decided to introduce a comic about Yugoslav Partisans, and in 1958, Žižović created the first episode of the comic. The comic debuted on 25 November 1958 in the Dečije novine monthly children's magazine. The story initially featured only Mirko (who was, reputedly, modeled after Žižović's son), while Slavko was added to the story later. Žižović chose the names Mirko and Slavko because they were common in all parts of Yugoslavia.

Mirko and Slavko episodes (as well as the other comics from Nikad robom) were published as 32-page comics, with 16 pages printed in color, in the format of 14,5x20,5 cm. Prior to Mirko and Slavko, the comics from Nikad robom edition were sold in 35,000 to 50,000 copies. However, stories of Mirko and Slavko were excellently received, and gradually upstaged all the other comics from Nikad robom series. The editors of Dečje novine decided to risk and print Mirko and Slavko in 120,000 copies, but soon found out that demand for the comic was even larger. At its peak of popularity, an episode of the comic was sold in more than 200,000 copies. The comic was also published in Slovenian and Macedonian language, in magazines like Naš koutek, Drugarče and Jednota. Gradually, other artists started working with Žižović on the comic: they would usually draw minor characters and background, and Žižović would later add main characters. Artists which worked with Žižović on Mirko and Slavko include Živorad Atanacković, Ratomir Petrović, Branko Plavšić, Milan Vranešević, Mile Rančić, Leo Korelc, Brana Nikolić, Nikola Mitrović "Kokan", Slaviša Ćirović, Stevica Živanov and others. The stories were initially written by Žižović himself, and later by various writers; the most successful ones were written by journalist Žarko Vukosavljević.

In 1975, the comic celebrated the publication of the 500th issue. However, by this time the comic's popularity had already heavily declined. By the mid-1970s, comics were in Yugoslavia already perceived as a form of art, and younger generation of comic artists and critics pronounced Mirko and Slavko outdated. They criticized the drawings, plots, dialogues and stereotypical characters. By some reports, the criticism of the comic was heavily supported by a Dečje novine competitor which published foreign comics. In 1979, Dečje novine finally cancelled the comic.

== Plot and characters ==
Prior to the invasion of Yugoslavia, young Mirko was a baker's apprentice somewhere in Šumadija. After the Axis occupation of Yugoslavia, Mirko decided to join the Partisans, exchanging two breads for a gun with a soldier of the defeated and disbanded Royal Yugoslav Army. In the initial three episodes, Mirko's comrades are two other young Partisans, Zoran and Boško, Boško dying in a battle with German soldiers. In episode four, the character of Slavko was introduced.

While Mirko is always brave and determined, Slavko tends to hesitate and sometimes can even get scared. Mirko is typically armed with MP 40 submachine gun, which was usually reserved for partisan commanders, while Slavko is typically armed with a regular rifle.

== Film adaptation ==
Mirko and Slavko was the first and only Yugoslav comic to be adapted into a live action film during the existence of the country. The 1973 film Mirko and Slavko, directed by Branimir "Tori" Janković, starred Vladimir Radenković as Mirko, Dragan Radonjić as Slavko and Velimir "Bata" Živojinović as Commander. The film was disliked by Žižović, who described it as "unrealistic and pretentious" and stated that it "ruined the comic".

== Influence and legacy ==
In the several years following the end of the World War II, the new communist authorities in Yugoslavia had an unfavorable view of comics, considering them decadent products of capitalism. By the time Mirko and Slavko appeared, the Non-Aligned Yugoslavia had been open towards Western culture more than the countries of the Eastern Bloc, and comics were regularly published by major newspaper publishers. However, Mirko and Slavko is often considered the comic which definitely changed the League of Communists attitude towards comics. Serbian cartoonist Aleksandar Zograf and comic book artist and historian Zdravko Zupan were of the opinion that Mirko and Slavko was not created with the purpose of political indoctrination of the Yugoslav youth, and that it was primarily an action comic.

Dečje novine annually received thousands of letters written by the fans of the comic. With the experience it had as the first distributor of the Walt Disney Company products in socialist Europe, Dečje novine signed contracts with various Yugoslav companies, and the characters of Mirko and Slavko appeared on t-shirts, satchels, notebooks and other products. Aleksandar Zograf stated that "the approach towards this entirely socialist phenomena was absolutely capitalistic".

In 2020, the 60th anniversary of the comic was marked with an exhibition on Belgrade's Flower Square.

=== "Mirko, watch out for the bullet!" ===
The line "Mirko, pazi metak!" ("Mirko, watch out for the bullet!"), allegedly spoken by Slavko in an issue of the comic, and Mirko's subsequent response: "Hvala, Slavko! Spasio si mi život!" ("Thank you, Slavko! You saved my life!") are widely known in former Yugoslav republics. The lines are often quoted as a symbol of the comic's naivety and propaganda character. However, although widely known, these lines never appeared in any issue of the comic and represent an urban legend.

In 1991, Serbian and Yugoslav alternative rock and avant-garde musician Rambo Amadeus released the song entitled "Mirko, pazi mozak (Nikad robom)" ("Mirko, Watch out for the Brain (Never a Slave)"). The line "Pazi, Mirko, metak" also appeared in another Rambo Amadeus song, "Amerika i Engleska" ("America and England"), and in the song "Ducka Diesel" by Montenegrin rap group Monteniggers.
