= Darko Perović =

Serbian comic-book and graphic novel creator

- Born: Darko Perović; June 14, 1965 (age 61) Aranđelovac, Yugoslavia
- Areas: Artist; Writer
- Notable works: Brek, Magico Vento, Shangai Devil, Alamo

Darko Perović (Serbian Cyrillic: Дарко Перовић; born June 14, 1965, in Aranđelovac) is a Serbian comic-book and graphic novel creator, known best for his comics. He works for Serbian, French, Italian and Spanish publishers and lives in Belgrade.
