= Croatian comics =

Croatian comics are comics produced in Croatia.

Comics started developing in Croatia in the late 19th century, mostly in humor and children's magazines. From the 1920s to the end of the 1980s, they were part of the larger Yugoslav comics scene; a large number of titles were published from the 1930s to 1950s, mainly in the Croatian language. After the breakup of Yugoslavia in the 1990s, Croatian comics have experienced a revival with many artists gaining international recognition.

== History ==
Croatian comics developed relatively early as both an artistic and commercial medium. Their beginnings, like in the rest of the world, can be traced back to the emergence of cartoons in a series of satirical newspapers in the late 19th and early 20th centuries, particularly in the newspaper Kopriva ("Nettles", from 1906). The first domestic Croatian comic, Maks i Maksić, appeared in 1925 and drawn by the Russian immigrant Sergej Mironovič Golovčenko, who was inspired by the works of Wilhelm Busch. Ten years later, Andrija Maurović, also called the father of Croatian comics, created the first Croatian "graphic novel" titled Vjerenica mača ("The Sword's Fiancée"), around the same time as the first such comics were emerging in the United States.

Maurović achieved international recognition with his dynamic and visually striking comics, characterized by sharp contour drawings, strong brushstrokes (pencil and ink), and black-and-white contrasts. His works, such as Podzemna carica ("Underground Empress"), Ljubavnica s Marsa ("Mistress from Mars"), and various Western-themed comics, demonstrated his mastery of visual composition and cinematic storytelling techniques. Maurović's comics were often subtitled, and he opposed the placement of speech bubbles over his later painterly color drawings. During this period, other notable Croatian comic artists included the Neugebauer brothers, Walter (illustrator) and Norbert (writer), as well as Ferdo Bis (hr), Ivo Kušanić, and Albert Kinert.

After World War II, there was a brief period of resistance to comics, but this was followed by a resurgence in the 1950s. Maurović and the Neugebauer brothers continued their work, and a new generation of artists emerged, forming the core of the second golden age of Croatian comics. This period was associated with the magazine Plavi vjesnik ("Blue Messenger", 1954–1973), preceded by Vjesnikov zabavnik Petko ("Vjesnik's Fun Magazine Petko", 1952–1953). The leading writers during this time were Zvonimir Furtinger (hr) and Rudi Aljinović (hr), while the notable artists included Žarko Beker (hr), Borivoj Dovniković and Zdenko Svirčić (hr).

In the late 1970s, a new aesthetic movement in Croatian comics emerged with the group of authors known as Novi kvadrat ("New Square"). Their style was influenced by European artistic comics, such as the works of Moebius and Hugo Pratt. They explored various genres, including caricatured social commentary, parody, artistic and graphic storytelling, and visually stunning historical or science fiction series.

Since the 1990s, many Croatian comic artists have gained international recognition, particularly in the United States and France. These include Mirko Ilić, Igor Kordej, Edvin Biuković, Goran Sudžuka, Goran Parlov, Esad T. Ribić, Danijel Žeželj, and Milan Trenc. While realistic traditions in Croatian comics are less common due to the non-commercial nature of the market, various artistic and alternative traditions thrive, including the work of Darko Macan, Stjepan Bartolić (hr), Dubravko Mataković, and artists associated with groups like Divlje oko.

== List of comic festivals in Croatia ==
- MaFest, Makarska
- Supertoon, Šibenik
- Comicator, Split
- OHOHO, Zagreb
- Zagreb Comic Con

== See also ==
- Serbian comics
- Italian comics
