= Dragan de Lazare =

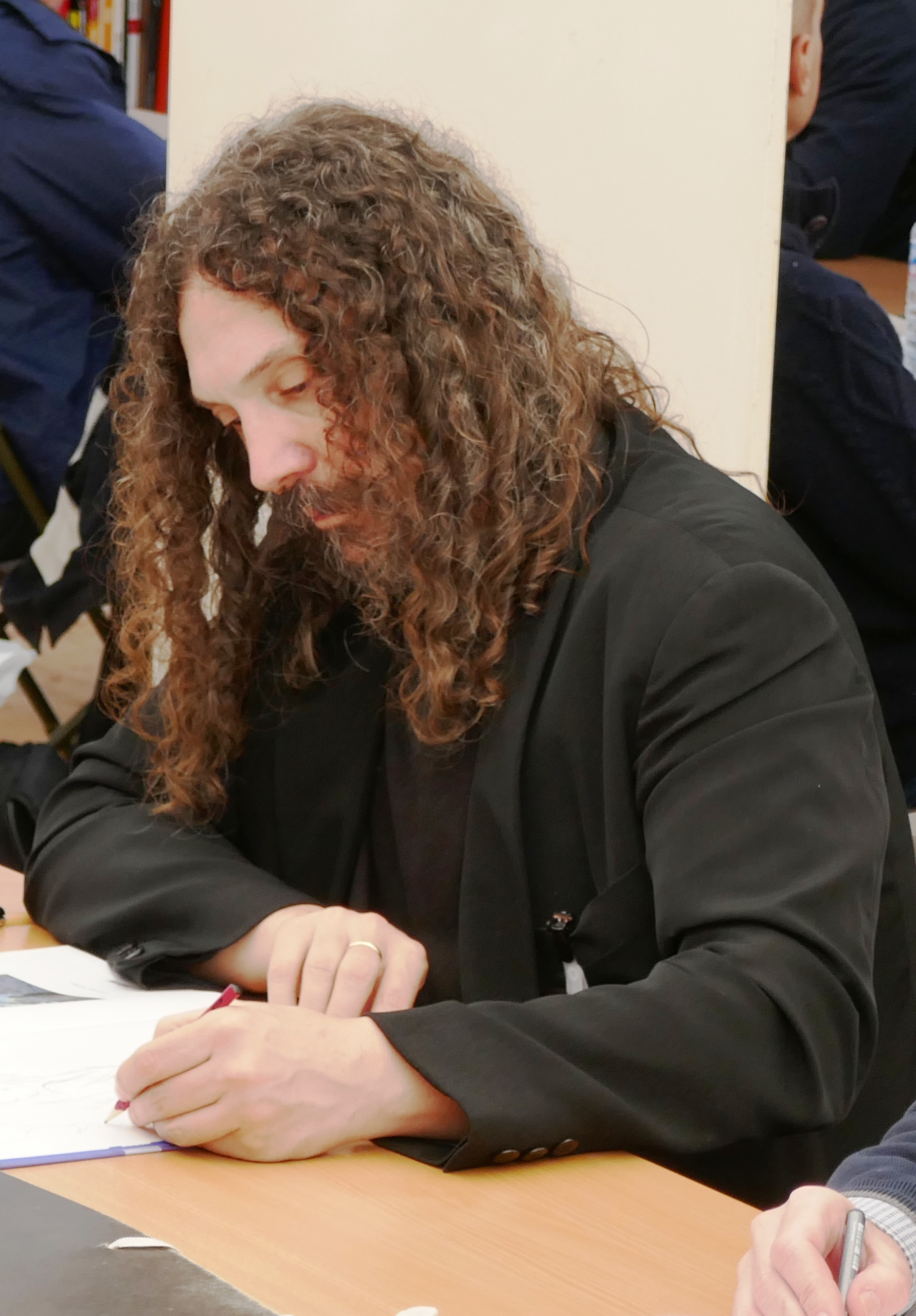
- Born: Dragan de Lazare; 8 May 1964 (age 62) Rio de Janeiro, Brazil
- Areas: Artist, cartoonist, writer
- Notable works: comics: Rubine; Acidités de couleur noire

Dragan de Lazare is an international pen name of Dragan Lazarević (Serbian Cyrillic: Драган Лазаревић, born 8 May 1964), a Serbian cartoonist, comic book and comic strip artist, illustrator and scriptwriter.

== Biography ==
He was born in Rio de Janeiro, and grew up in Yugoslavia and France. He debuted in Yugoslav comics industry when he was 17, becoming a member of "Beogradski krug 2" artistic group.

His notable works include Franco-Belgian comics series "Rubine" created with Mythic and François Walthéry, and one shot Acidités de couleur noire, with BAM and Lazar Odanović. He lives in Belgrade.

== Comics ==
- Une aventure de Yves Rokatansky, written by Lazar Odanović alias Lazzaro, Sorg
1. Le témoin, 1989.
- Rubine, written by Mythic and François Walthéry, Le Lombard
1. Les mémoires troubles, 1993.
2. Fenêtre sur rue, 1994.
3. Le second témoin, 1995.
4. Serial killer, 1996.
5. La disparue d'Halloween, 1997.
6. America, 1998.
7. Devoirs de vacances, 2000.
8. 96 heures, 2002.
- Acidités de couleur noire, with BAM and Odanović, YIL Editions, 2016.
