= Đorđe Lobačev =

Russian and Yugoslav comic strip author (1909–2002)

- Born: Yuriy Pavlovich Lobachev; March 4, 1909 Shkodër, Ottoman Albania
- Died: July 23, 2002 (aged 93) Saint Petersburg, Russia
- Area: Cartoonist

Đorđe Lobačev (Serbian Cyrillic: Ђорђе Лобачев) or Yuriy Lobachev (Russian: Юрий Лобачев; 1909–2002) was a Soviet Russian and Serbian-Yugoslavian comic strip author and illustrator. He was one of the pioneers of the comic strip in the Kingdom of Yugoslavia in the interwar period. Most of his comics from this period have themes from the history of Serbia and Serbian folklore. He lived Yugoslavia until 1949 when he was expelled during the Informbiro period because he was a Soviet citizen. He lived in Romania for few years before moving to the Soviet Russia where he spent the rest of his life. He was the author of the first Soviet comic strip Hurricane Comes to the Rescue in 1966.

He is widely regarded as one of the founding fathers of both Serbian and Russian comic strip.

== Biography ==
Lobačev was born Yuriy Pavlovich Lobachev (Russian: Юрий Павлович Лобачев) om 4 March 1909 in Shkodër, Ottoman Albania, a son of Russian consul. His family spent the time of the Balkan Wars (1912-1913) in the Kingdom of Montenegro and he was baptized in Cetinje. During the World War I, he lived in Kosovska Mitrovica, on the island of Crete and in Thessaloniki. After the war he settled first in Novi Sad, and then, after his parents have died in 1922, he moved to Belgrade, where he studied at the Russian-Serbian Gymnasium. He studied art history at the University of Belgrade Faculty of Philosophy.

Lobačev started his comics career in 1930s. His first comic strip was Bloody Heritage, on which he worked together with his best man and fellow Russian emigrant Vadim Kurgansky. It was inspired by American comic Secret Agent X-9, and was published in 1935, just a month after first Serbian comic strip was published by Vlasta Belkić. But, Lobačev was not satisfied with imitating American comics, so he decided to create authentic Serbian comics. He created first comic on the theme from Serbian literature Hajduk Stanko, based on the novel by Janko Veselinović. It was published by Politika in 1936. After this, he continued to create comics for several newspapers and magazines including Politika, Politikin Zabavnik, Mika Miš and Mikijevo carstvo. His drew inspiration for his comics from literature (The Courier of the Czar based on "Michael Strogoff", The Children of Captain Grant based on "In Search of the Castaways", etc.) and Serbian folklore (Baš Čelik, Dušan's Wedding, Destruction of Pirlitor, and Čardak ni na nebu ni na zemlji). He also made some fantasy comics, like Princess Ru, which was published in France by Aventures in 1939.

During the World War II occupation of Yugoslavia Lobačev published just one comic in 1942, which is among his best-known, Biberče, based on the eponymous Serbian fairy tale. He joined Yugoslav Partisans, participated in the Belgrade Offensive and fought at the Syrmian Front. After the War was over, he lived in Belgrade and worked for Politika, making comics and illustrations. But, he never obtained the citizenship of Yugoslavia, and was de jure stateless. In 1946 he was granted the citizenship of the Soviet Union, which he never visited up to that moment. In 1949, at the height of the Informbiro period, Lobačev was first fired from Politika, and then deported from Yugoslavia to Romania (part of the Cominform) because of his Soviet citizenship. He lived in Romania and was not allowed to move to Soviet Union, because Stalin was suspicious to those who spent time living in capitalism. He was allowed to move to the Soviet Union only in November 1955, after Stalin's death, and he settled in Leningrad. In Leningrad, Lobačev worked illustrations, since comic strip was viewed as western fashion and discouraged. He created first Soviet comic strip, Hurricane Comes to the Rescue in 1966, but it was heavily censored, and no comics were subsequently published in the Soviet Union until early eighties.

Lobačev was allowed to visit Belgrade in 1964 for the first time after his deportation, and visited it frequently for the rest of his life. Beginning in 1965, he continued publishing comics in Serbian for Politikin Zabavnik (first of these was Secret Cave published in 1965). In 1976, Yugoslav publisher Jugoslavija published a book of his comics Čudesni svet Đorđa Lobačeva ("The Wonderful World of Đorđe Lobačev") for which he re-draw some of his early comics.

Lobačev died in Saint Petersburg on 23 July 2002. He is regarded as one of the most important comic strip authors in both Serbia and Russia, and is often referred to as the "father of Serbian comics" and "father of Russian comics". Belgrade School of Comics was renamed "Đorđe Lobačev" in his honor in 1996. In 2011, Pavel Fetisov filmed a documentary "Yuriy Lobachev, the Father of Russian Comics" (Юрий Лобачев. Отец русского комикса). Lobačev's book of memoirs titled When Volga met Sava (Serbian: Kad se Volga ulivala u Savu) was published in Belgrade in 1997.

== See also ==
- Serbian comics
