= Dražen Kovačević =

- Born: Dražen Kovačević; October 20, 1974 (age 52) Zagreb, Yugoslavia
- Areas: Penciler; Inker; Colorist
- Notable works: Wheel (fr. La Roue sr. Točak), fr. Meute de l'enfer
- Awards: first prize of Bedecouvertes concurs by Glénat

Dražen Kovačević (born 1974 in Zagreb) is a popular Serbian comic-book creator, known best for his comic Wheel (Serbian: "Točak") created with Goran Skrobonja. He mainly works for major French publishers.

== Comicography ==
- „La Roue,“ script Goran Skrobonja
1. La prophétie de Korot, „Glénat“, France, 2001. Novel adaptation: Vladimir Vesović
2. Les 7 combattants de Korot I, —||—, 2002
3. Les 7 combattants de Korot II, —||—, 2003.
4. Les 7 combattants de Korot III, —||—, 2005.
- „La Meute de l'enfer“, script Philippe Thirault
1. Les compagnons de l'aigle, „Les Humanoïdes Associés“, France, 2003.
2. Le retour du harith, —||—, 2005.
3. Le secret de la Sibylle, —||—, 2006.
4. La tanière du mal, —||—, 2010.
- „L' Épée de Feu“, script Sylvain Cordurié
1. La malédiction de Garlath, „Soleil Productions“, France, 2009.
2. La faiblesse de la chair, —||—, 2011.
- „Walkyrie“, script Sylvain Cordurié
1. Légendes nordiques, „Soleil“, France, 2012.
