= Politikin Zabavnik =

- Politikin Zabavnik cover featuring Gorillaz, May 2007
- Editor-in-chief: Zefirino Grasi
- Categories: Magazine for amusement and science Comic magazine
- Frequency: Weekly
- Circulation: 45,000
- Publisher: Politika Newspapers & Magazines
- First issue: 28 February 1939; 87 years ago
- Company: Politika AD (50%); WAZ (50%)
- Country: Serbia
- Language: Serbian
- Website: www.politikin-zabavnik.rs

Politikin Zabavnik (Serbian Cyrillic: Политикин Забавник) is a popular magazine in Serbia, published by Politika Newspapers and Magazines.

The first issue came out on 28 February 1939. In the beginning it was printed in the form of a newspaper and issued biweekly, on Tuesdays and Fridays. Nowadays it comes out weekly, on Fridays. One part of the magazine is comics, while the other parts contain articles about science, nature, history, art and interesting events, written to appeal to the broadest audiences. The magazine's famous slogan labels it as "Za sve od 7 do 107" (For everyone from 7 to 107). The slogan once said "For everyone from 7 to 77", but was changed after the editor received a letter from a reader saying he had recently turned 78 and asking whether he was still fit to read it. The magazine was awarded the Sretenje order of the Republic of Serbia.

== History ==
=== Pre-World War II years (1939–1941) ===
First editorship consisted of journalists from Politika, headed by Vladislav S. Ribnikar, Dušan Timotijević and Živojin Vukadinović. They were among the enthusiasts who were gathering Serbian intellectual left wing during the late 1930s. They had the idea about making an amusing newspaper containing novels, short stories and comic strips. On 31 December 1938 Politika came out with an open competition for the name of new edition. Between 34,998 coupons that arrived, one fifth voted for the name Politikin Zabavnik (Politika's Entertainer) among other suggestions. The magazine's first issue was published on 28 February 1939. It was issued in the form of Berliner newspaper (31×47 cm). It had 12 pages printed in black and white. Four of them were printed with addition of red color and its undertones. The concept of Politikin Zabavnik was balanced relation between comics and texts, such as novels, stories and interesting facts.

As comics editor Duda Timotijević was in charge of translation of American comic strips and Sunday strips. He gave Serbian names to many Disney's characters to reflect their characteristics. Beside Disney's comic strips Politikin Zabavnik published comics such as: Jungle Jim, Ming Foo, Little Annie Rooney, The Lone Ranger, Red Ryder, Thimble Theatre, Curley Harper, Brick Bradford, and King of the Royal Mounted. Domestic comic authors also had significant space: Đorđe Lobačev (comics related to Serbian folklore – Baš Čelik and Čardak ni na nebu ni na zemlji), Moma Marković (Rista sportista – adventures of Belgrade boys), Konstantin Kuznjecov (adaptation of Pushkin's tales in verse – The Tale of the Golden Cockerel and The Tale of Tsar Saltan), and Sergej Solovjev (adaptation of R. L. Stevenson's Treasure Island). The main difference between Politikin Zabavnik and concurrent comic publishers, such as Mika Miš and Mikijevo carstvo, was textual parts containing crosswords, novels, Ripley's Believe It or Not!, news from science to sport, and numerous short, interesting and edifying texts. Additionally it had exclusive rights on, in that time in Serbia, the extremely popular Walt Disney comics.

Editor of textual parts was Bata Vukadinović. Politikin zabavnik featured novels of Edgar Allan Poe, Mark Twain, H. G. Wells and many other famous writers.

Average magazine circulation came to 41,000 per issue, which was at the time a great number. But World War II stopped the publishing of the magazine. The last of the pre-war editions (No 220) came out on 4 April 1941, two days before the bombing of Belgrade.

=== After-war years (1952–1967) ===
After the war, the new communist regime banned comics. Their explanation was that comics are a decadent product of capitalism. However, after the end of Soviet influence in Yugoslavia, and especially after the Informbiro period, cultural bondages started to loose. First it started with caricatures and animated movies, and later some comics acquiescently started to be published in different editions.

Seven years after World War II, Vladislav Ribnikar decided to re-establish the magazine. The first post-war issue came out on 5 January 1952. Editor in chief was Kosta Stepanović, and his first assistant Bogdan Popović, (he later also became editor). Allegedly, it was prearranged by a visit of Athens' representative of Walt Disney Company. He suggested to president Josip Broz Tito to re-establish comic publishing in Yugoslavia. Tito's reputed answer was: "Why not, I like Donald Duck". The fact is that Disney's characters had significant space in Politikin Zabavnik.

=== Modern age (1968–present) ===
The first day of 1968 was a historical date for the magazine. Nikola Lekić, chief editor in that time, changed its form from newspaper to magazine format (25×33 cm), and it was now published in color. Another significant addition was a comic in the middle of the magazine. Before that, Politikin Zabavnik published only comic strips. The magazine now contained a complete episode of a comic separated into 2-3 parts.

Starting from 1971, Politikin Zabavnik was also printed in the Latin alphabet (in ijekavian dialect) and Slovenian, and at its peak it reached a number of 330,000 copies per issue (1975). Printing of Slovenian Language edition stopped in 1989 after 843 numbers when sold circulation fell to 8000 copies, soon after that Latin alphabet version also stopped.

In January 1988, Zabavnik changed the format again, becoming a little smaller (21×30 cm). Although it has been slightly redesigned several times since, it is still published in that format.

In 2019 the Slovenian-language version was resurrected by the new publisher.

== Logo ==
The logo of Politikin Zabavnik features Donald Duck as a newspaper seller. At the beginning of 1993, due to an embargo against FR Yugoslavia imposed by United Nations, Politikin Zabavnik had to stop publishing Disney's comic strips, and instead of Donald Duck just a silhouette of him appeared in the logo. After the Yugoslav wars Disney's characters returned to the magazine.

== Sections ==
Every issue consists of recurring and periodical sections and other texts related to magazine content. Constant sections:

- Веровали или не! (Ripley's Believe It or Not!)
- Јесте ли већ чули да... (Have You already Heard that...) — Interesting facts
- Хогар Страшни (Hägar the Horrible) — Comic strip
- Ма шта кажеш (You Don't Say) — Interesting news and anecdotes
- Живот пише драме (Life Writes Dramas) — Dramatic stories from real life
- Зашто? Како? (Why? How?) — Answers to various questions
- Забавникове логичке загонетке (Zabavnik's Logical Riddles) — Logical and mathematical problems
- Comic — 12-15 pages of one comic, usually separated on 3-5 sequels
- Енигматика (Enigmatic)
- Забавников ЗОО (Zabavnik's ZOO) — Texts about animals
- Хит страна (Hit Page) - Texts related to popular music
- High Tech — Articles about new technological gadgets
- Са Забавником у свет (Around the World with Zabavnik) — Photographs by the readers
- Ја ♥ ПТТ (I ♥ PTT) — Pages for letters of readers, and answers on their questions about miscellaneous topics
- Рекли су (They Said...) — Quotes by famous people
- Гарфилд (Garfield) — Comic strip

Periodical sections:

- Београд кога више нема (Belgrade that Is Gone) — Texts about history of Belgrade
- Живот је бајка (Life Is a Fairytale) — Stories about lives of famous and not so famous people
- Изуми, открића, достигнућа (Inventions, Discoveries, Achievements) — Technology and science texts
- На врх језика (On the Tip of Tongue) — Interesting orthographical facts
- Ово можда нисте знали (Maybe You Haven't Heard of This) — Interesting facts
- Пут око света за 120 динара (Journey around the World for 120 Dinars) — Texts about different countries or locations
- Забавников историјски Забавник (Zabavnik's historical Zabavnik) — Texts about historical topics
- Потрага за благом (Treasure hunt) - Texts about lost and found treasures
- Свака слика има причу (Every Picture Has a Story) — Texts about artists and artworks
- Свет у бројкама (World in Numbers) - Texts about various topics given through numbers
- Задаци за 21. век (Tasks for the 21st Century) — Science texts
- За читање и уживање (For Reading and Enjoyment) — Short stories
- Фантастика (Fantasy) — Fantasy and Science fiction stories

== Comics ==
During the years Politikin Zabavnik has published numerous comics and strips. Mostly American, French, Belgian and those of domestic authors. Some of the famous comics often published in Politikin Zabavnik are:

- XIII
- The Adventures of Tintin
- Asterix
- Batman
- Bernard Prince
- Blacksad
- Blueberry
- Brick Bradford
- De Cape et de Crocs
- Cocco Bill
- Corto Maltese
- Dennis the Menace
- Dick Tracy
- Dikan
- Flash Gordon
- He-Man
- Iznogoud
- Jeremiah
- Katzenjammer Kids
- Largo Winch
- Lucky Luke
- Mandrake the Magician
- Michel Vaillant
- Modesty Blaise
- The Phantom
- Popeye
- Prince Valiant
- Rahan
- Rip Kirby
- Rocco Vargas
- Secret Agent X-9
- The Thread of Art
- Spirou et Fantasio
- Superman
- Zigomar

== Politikin Zabavnik Literature Awards ==
Politikin Zabavnik Literature Award (Књижевна награда Политикиног забавника) is an annual award for the best book for the young readers, published in the previous calendar year. It was established in 1980 (for year 1979). The awards ceremony takes place every year on the foundation day of Politika - 25 January. Every youth book in Serbian or a language of national minorities in Serbia. has the right to participate in the contest.

Among the writers awarded are: Grozdana Olujić, Enes Kišević, Milovan Vitezović, Gradimir Stojković, Pavao Pavličić, Vladimir Stojšin, Branko V. Radičević, Slobodan Stanišić, Mirjana Stefanović, Milenko Maticki, Svetlana Velmar Janković, Vesna Aleksić, Vladimir Andrić, Uglješa Šajtinac and others.

== Controversies ==
On January 18, 2019, Politikin Zabavnik published an article about Serbian WW2 far-right politician and ideologue Dimitrije Ljotić.
