= Fumetto International Comics Festival =

The Fumetto International Comics Festival is held annually at Lucerne, Switzerland. The festival was established in 1992 as the Luzern Comix Festival, before growing in size and renaming itself in 2003. The festival has helped Switzerland's comics community unify and grow, crossing the divide between the differing language barriers within the country. The festival attracts both national and international guests. Comics creators honored or exhibited at the festival include Joe Sacco, Marjane Satrapi, Chris Ware, Jack Kirby and Lewis Trondheim.
