= The Comics We Loved =

2011 guidebook to 20th Century Yugoslavian comic books

The Comics We Loved: Selection of 20th Century Comics and Creators from the Region of Former Yugoslavia
- Author: Živojin Tamburić, Zdravko Zupan and Zoran Stefanović with preface by Paul Gravett
- Original title: Stripovi koje smo voleli: izbor stripova i stvaralaca sa prostora bivše Jugoslavije u XX veku / Стрипови које смо волели: избор стрипова и стваралаца са простора бивше Југославије у XX веку
- Translator: Živojin Tamburić et al
- Language: Serbian, English
- Genre: encyclopedia
- Publisher: "Omnibus", Belgrade
- Publication date: June 28, 2011
- Publication place: Serbia
- Media type: Print (Hardback)
- Pages: 312 pages
- ISBN: 978-86-87071-03-2

The Comics We Loved: Selection of 20th Century Comics and Creators from the Region of Former Yugoslavia (Serbian: Стрипови Које Смо Волели: Избор Стрипова И Стваралаца Са Простора Бивше Југославије У XX Веку) is a guidebook to 20th Century Yugoslavian comic books. It was co-authored by Zdravko Zupan and Zoran Stefanović and edited by Živojin Tamburić. The book was published in Serbia by Modest Stripovi in 2011.

== Summary ==
The book provides basic information, panel examples, and critiques or citations from critiques for 400 comics from 200 artists, 150 scriptwriters, and 50 writers whose works were used in comics. With the help from approximately 100 comics critics from the Western Balkans, the book has been written and compiled by three co-authors: Živojin Tamburić (who is also initiator and editor of the book), Zdravko Zupan, and Zoran Stefanović.

Popularity, creativity, societal relevance, art, professional accomplishment, and curiosity were employed as selection criteria for comics. The book is distinguished by many research materials and a rediscovery of previously unpopular authors’ opuses after decades of obscurity. The book is published in the Serbian language, but the major parts are translated into English.

== Reception ==
"In this book, these intrepid, discriminating compilers have realized an exceptional achievement by combing diligently through thousands of pages of comics and comics reviews to distill a captivating alphabet of artists and writers who have shaped and enhanced not only the comics of their homeland but in several cases the comics of the world." — Paul Gravett, writer, curator, international comics historian, director of Comica Festival, London

"Jury's decision was based on the excellence and grandeur of this project, which thoroughly analyzes, systematizes, and popularizes 20th-century comic books in former Yugoslavia. The authors of this lexicon of critical essays, which are all top experts in their field, have proven to be fully competent to create such a detailed and ambitious project to serve as a testimony to the history of comic book culture, its quality surpassing all borders as it can boast obvious regional significance." — Belgrade Book Fair Jury for Serbian Edition of the Year Award.

"When you have in one place a complete overview of the most important authors, magazines, and critics of comics, it means you have a guide which you can absolutely trust." - Momčilo Rajin, art historian, editor, and author

"The Comics We Loved by Živojin Tamburić, Zdravko Zupan, and Zoran Stefanović represents a pioneering achievement in the history and critique of the 9th Art in Serbia and Yugoslavia." - Vasa Pavković, writer, editor and critic

"The Comics We Loved is the book that in the 21st century will draw attention to this previously less emphasized cultural factor, which shaped the consciousness of contemporaries in the previous century." - Slobodan Ivkov, editor, critic and curator

== Awards and recognitions ==
- “Award for the Best Publishing Achievement of the Year” on the Book Fair in Belgrade, 2011, for The Comics We Loved.
- “Comic Event of the Year” by NIN magazine, Belgrade, 2011, for The Comics We Loved.
