= Gradimir Smudja =

Serbian comics artist (born 1956)

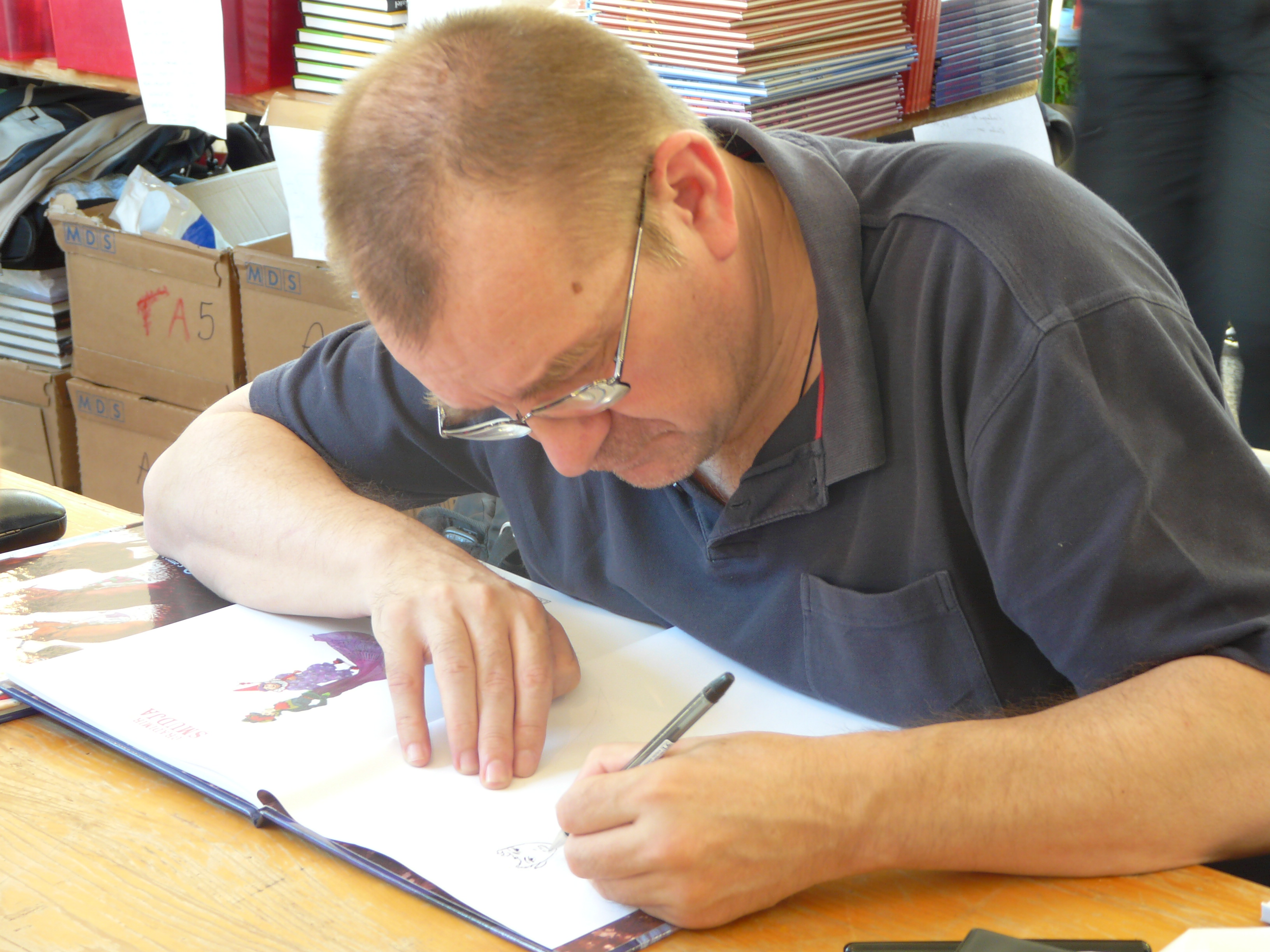
Gradimir Smudja at the International Comic Festival of Sollies Ville, France

Gradimir Smudja (Serbian Cyrillic: Градимир Смуђа, born in Novi Sad, 1956) is a Serbian comics artist/painter in Italy and France. He is currently resident of Lucca, Tuscany, (Italy).

Smudja only recently published an acclaimed comic "Le Cabaret des Muses" (first called "Le Bordel des Muses"; tomes: I, II, III, IV), telling the life story of the French masterpainter Toulouse-Lautrec. The comic is being sold all over Europe and has been published in French, Dutch, Spanish, Serbian, German, Hungarian, Italian and other languages. This was a follow-up to the much-acclaimed comic Vincent et Van Gogh, the epic story about the Dutch painter Vincent van Gogh and his cat.

== Published works ==
Comics:

- Vincent et Van Gogh - Delcourt (2003), ISBN 2-84055-998-6
- Le Bordel des Muses "Au Moulin Rouge" - Delcourt (2004), ISBN 2-84789-171-4
- Le Cabaret des Muses "Mimi et Henri" - Delcourt (2005), ISBN 2-84789-780-1
- Le Cabaret des Muses "Allez Darling" - Delcourt (2007), ISBN 978-2-7560-0565-2
- Le Cabaret des Muses "Darling, pour toujours" - Delcourt (2008), ISBN 2-7560-1123-1
- Vincent et Van Gogh "Trois lunes" - Delcourt (2010), ISBN 978-2-7560-2030-3

Art books:

- Circo dell'Arte - Nebelsplater/Verlag (1991), ISBN 3-85819-163-9
- Schneeflöckli - Carlo De Simoni (1999), ISBN W002 99
- Die Sonnenschein-Bande - Pepperwood/Smudja (2000), ISBN 3-905691-00-0
- Dylan Faces Book - Zanpano (2009), ISBN 978-2-915757-17-0
