= Milan Konjević =

Serbian film director, screenwriter, and comics writer

Milan Konjević (Serbian Cyrillic: Милан Коњевић; born 1970, in Belgrade), is a Serbian film director, screenwriter and comics writer.

== Filmography ==
- Zone of the Dead (2009)
