= Živojin Tamburić =

Serbian comics critic, historian, editor and publisher

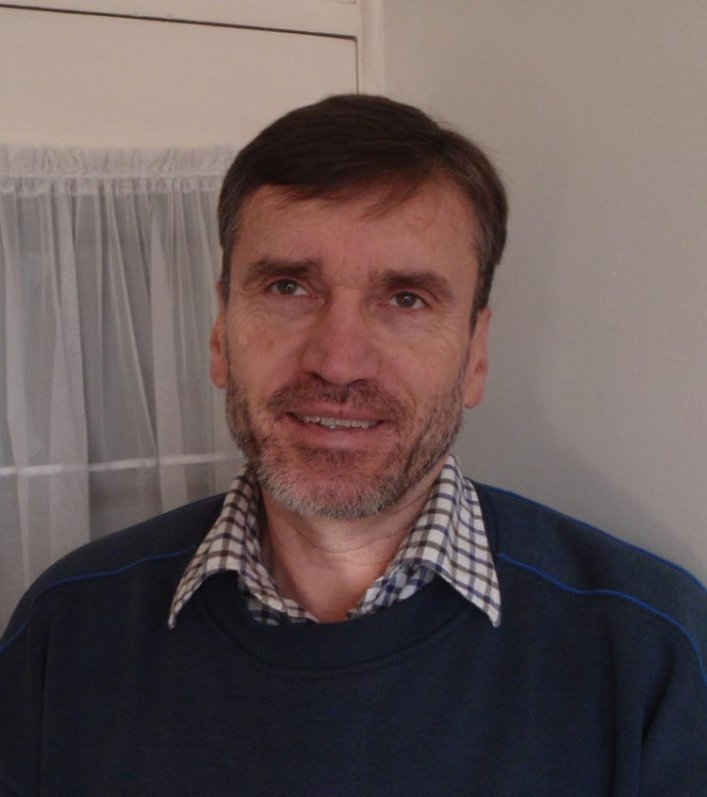
- Born: 1957 (age 68–69); Kruševac, Yugoslavia
- Occupations: comics critic, historian, editor and publisher
- Writing career
- Subject: Comics
- Website: www.modestycomics.com

Živojin "Žika" Tamburić (Serbian Cyrillic: Живојин Тамбурић; born 1957 in Kruševac, Yugoslavia) is a Serbian comics critic, historian, editor and publisher, most notable for his work on first critical comics lexicon in Eastern Europe, The Comics We Loved, Selection of 20th Century Comics and Creators from the Region of Former Yugoslavia (2011).

== Work as critic and historian ==
Živojin Tamburić's reviews and essays have been published in eminent periodicals in Serbia and Croatia: Strip Vesti, Stripoteka, Politika, Kvartal, Kvadrat, Gradac, Mediantrop etc. He was one of contributors for the Paul Gravett’s book 1001 Comics You Must Read Before You Die (2011) as well as writer of introductory essays for the comics books, such as Serbian edition of Ethel and Ernest by Raymond Briggs or Bad Boy by Mladen Oljača.

Tamburić is initiator, editor and co-author, with Zdravko Zupan and Zoran Stefanović, of the book The Comics We Loved, Selection of 20th Century Comics and Creators from the Region of Former Yugoslavia (2011), which is an awarded critical lexicon in Serbian and English, presenting more than 400 comics by approximately 200 artists, as well as same number of scriptwriters and writers. This is first lexicon of its kind in Eastern Europe. Writer of the foreword is British comics historian and critic Paul Gravett.

== Work as editor and publisher ==
Tamburić is a comics editor in Belgrade’s publishing house “Omnibus”, from 2011, responsible for four areas – domestic comics after 1990, foreign comics after 1990, domestic classics and domestic critiques and monographs. He is also an editor and co-founder of the London-based website "Modesty Comics", where he presents authors and comics in English language, mainly from the Balkans, from 2013. He also works as a civil engineer and lives in London and Belgrade.

== Awards and recognitions ==
- “Award for the Best Publishing Achievement of the Year” on the Book Fair in Belgrade, 2011, for The Comics We Loved.
- “Comic Event of the Year” by NIN magazine, Belgrade, 2011, for The Comics We Loved.
- “Award for the best publications of the foreign material in Serbia 2012/2013”, International Comics Festival – Salon Stripa, Belgrade, 2013, for “Omnibus” publishing.
