= Aleksandar Zograf =

Serbian cartoonist

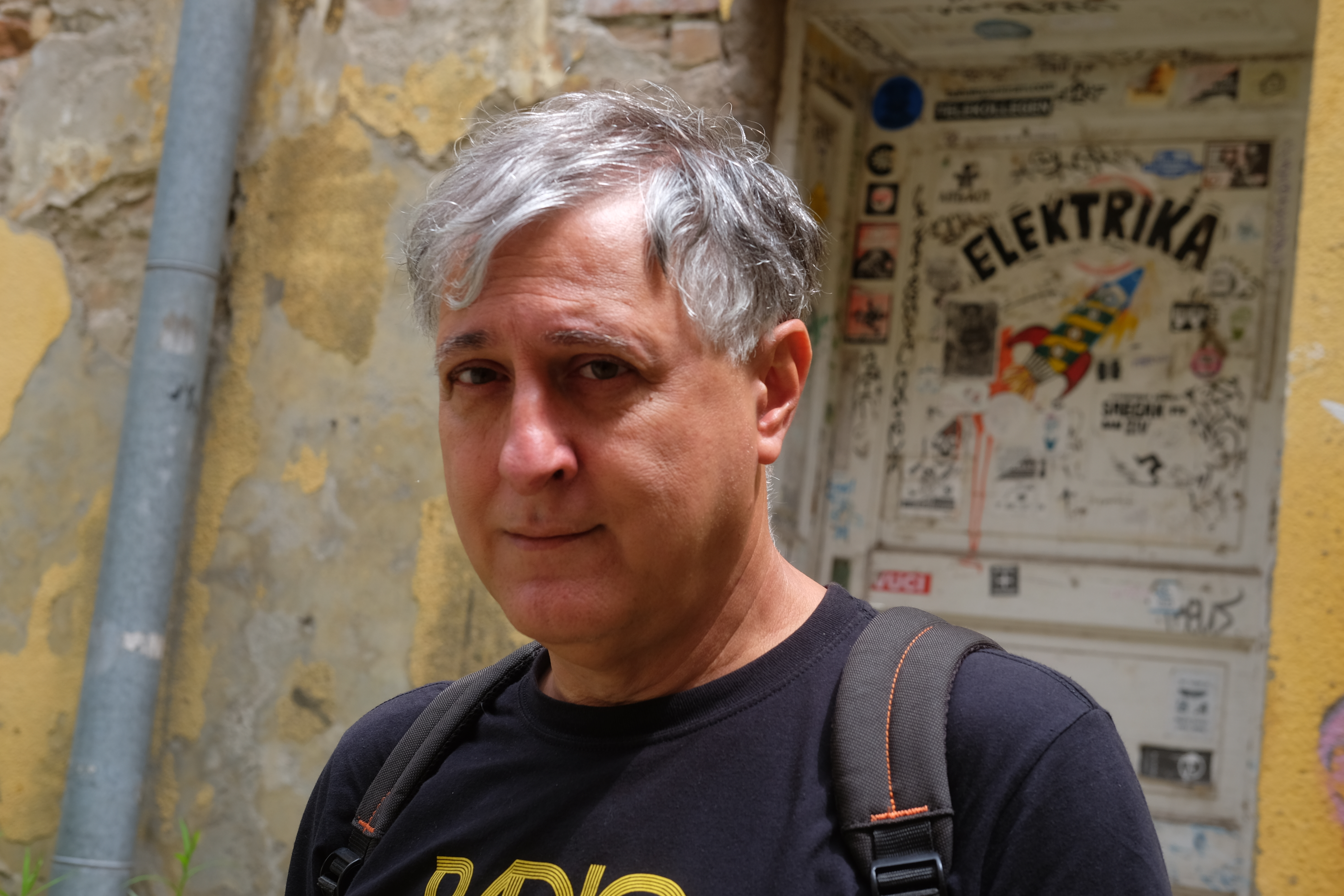
- Born: Saša Rakezić; 1963 (age 62–63) Pančevo, Serbia
- Area: Cartoonist
- Pseudonym: Aleksandar Zograf
- Notable works: Bulletins from Serbia; Psychonaut

Saša Rakezić (born 1963 in Pančevo, Serbia), better known by his pen name Aleksandar Zograf, is a Serbian cartoonist. His works focus mostly on life in the former Yugoslavia, such as Life Under Sanctions, Psychonaut, Dream Watcher and Bulletins from Serbia.

== Career ==
In 2017, Zograf signed the Declaration on the Common Language of the Croats, Serbs, Bosniaks and Montenegrins.

== Bibliography ==
- Life Under Sanctions (Fantagraphics, 1994)
- Psychonaut (#1-2 published by Fantagraphics, 1996; #3 by Monster Pants Comics/Freight Films, 1999)
- Flock of Dreamers (Kitchen Sink Press, 1997)
- Bulletins from Serbia: E-Mails & Cartoon Strips From Beyond the Front Line (Slab-O-Concrete, 1999) ISBN 1-899866-31-0 — translated into several languages.
- Dream Watcher (Slab-O-Concrete, 1999) ISBN 1-899866-13-2
- Jamming with Zograf (self-published, 2002) — collaborations with other cartoonists, including Jim Woodring and Robert Crumb.
- Regards from Serbia (Top Shelf Productions, 2007) ISBN 1-891830-42-2
