= Comic magazine =

Comic magazine may refer to:

- Comic book, a publication that consists of comics art in the form of sequential panels that represent individual scenes
- Comics anthology, a collection of works in the medium of comics compiled into an anthology or magazine
- British comics, a periodical published in the United Kingdom that contains comic strips
- Franco-Belgian comics magazine, a comics magazine that is usually originally in French and is created for readership in France and Belgium
- Manga magazine, a comic magazine originating from Japan
- Comic Magazine, a 1986 Japanese film
- Comic Magazines, the parent company of Quality Comics, an American comic book publishing
