= Zdravko Zupan =

Yugoslav comic book creator and historian

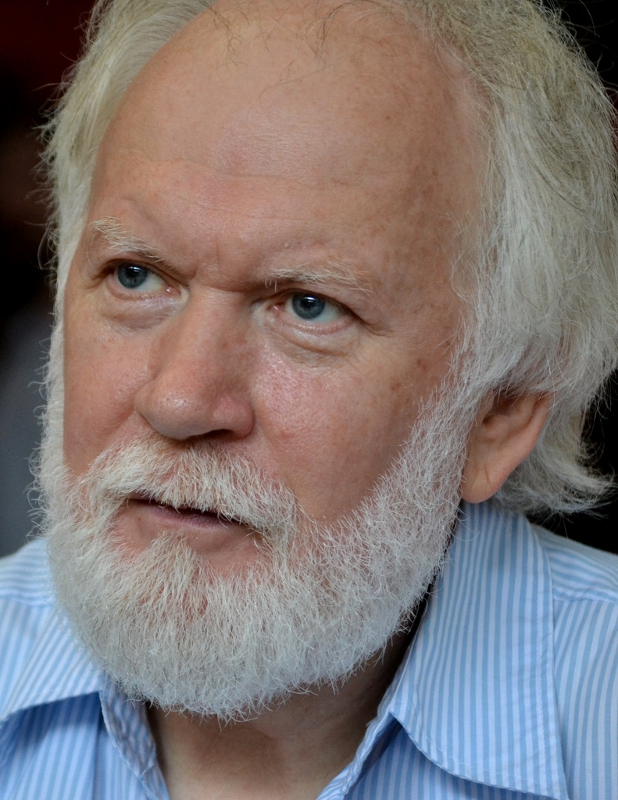
- Born: 7 February 1950 Zagreb, PR Croatia, FPR Yugoslavia
- Died: 9 October 2015 (aged 65) Zemun, Serbia
- Areas: Artist; Writer; Historian
- Notable works: Mickey Mouse; Tom & Jerry; Zuzuko

Zdravko Zupan (Serbian Cyrillic: Здравко Зупан; 7 February 1950 – 9 October 2015) was a Yugoslav comic book creator and historian.

He is best known for comics such as "Tom & Jerry", "Zuzuko", "Munja", "Mickey Mouse", "Goofy" and "Ellsworth". Zupan is considered the most important historian of Yugoslav and Serbian comics. He lived in Belgrade.

== Bibliography ==
=== Comics ===
- "Zuzuko", written by Z. Zupan et al., Yu strip, Munja, Bijela pčela etc., Serbia and Croatia, 1973-
- "Tom & Jerry", written by Lazar Odanović and Z. Zupan, VPA, Croatia, 1983–1988.
- "Mickey Mouse", written by François Corteggiani, Le Journal de Mickey, France, 1990–1994.
- "Goofy", written by F. Corteggiani, Le Journal de Mickey, France, 1990–1994.
- "Ellsworth", written by F. Corteggiani, Le Journal de Mickey, France, 1990–1994.
- "Miki i Baš-Čelik", written by Nikola Maslovara, Mikijev zabavnik, Serbia, 1999.
- "Munja", written by Z. Zupan, Vasa Pavković and Zoran Stefanović, Munja, Munja Strip and Bijela pčela, Serbia and Croatia, 2001-

=== History of comics ===
- Istorija jugoslovenskog stripa I, Slavko Draginčić and Zdravko Zupan, Novi Sad, 1986.
- Vek stripa u Srbiji, Zdravko Zupan, Pančevo, 2007. ISBN 978-86-87103-19-1
- Veljko Kockar - strip, život, smrt, Zdravko Zupan (ed.), Pančevo, 2010. ISBN 978-86-87103-19-1
- The Comics We Loved, Selection of 20th Century Comics and Creators from the Region of Former Yugoslavia (Stripovi koje smo voleli: izbor stripova i stvaralaca sa prostora bivše Jugoslavije u XX veku), Živojin Tamburić, Zdravko Zupan and Zoran Stefanović, foreword by Paul Gravett, Belgrade, 2011. ISBN 978-86-87071-03-2
- Zigomar - maskirani pravednik by Branko Vidić, Nikola Navojev and Dragan Savić; editor and writer of the foreword: Zdravko Zupan, Pančevo, 2011. ISBN 978-86-87103-36-8
- Uragan, by Aleksije Ranhner and Svetislav B. Lazić, editor and writer of the foreword: Zdravko Zupan, Pančevo, 2012. ISBN 978-86-87103-42-9
