= Serbian science fiction =

Science fiction and fantasy in Serbia has a long and varied history.

== History ==
As far back as the end of the 18th century, science fiction elements can be found in Serbian literature. Its modern period foundation is considered to began with "Posle milijon godina" (After Million of Years), written by Dragutin Ilić in 1889, which is also considered the first science fiction theatrical play in the history of the world literature. Lazar Komarčić's novel "Jedna ugašena zvezda" (An Extinct Star) followed, with publication in 1902.

Today, Zoran Živković (writer), winner of the World Fantasy Award, is considered one of the best-known Serbian science fiction authors, and perhaps the best known.

== Serbian science fiction and fantasy writers ==
- Ratko Adamović
- Danilo Alargić
- Snežana Altman
- Milivoj Anđelković
- Radmilo Anđelković
- Dragan Babić
- Stevan Babić
- Ilija Bakić
- Lidija Beatović
- Branko Belan
- Dušan Belča
- Dragan Biskupović
- Milan Borić
- Stevan Bošnjak
- Toma Brut (pseudonym)
- Voja Carić
- Dobrica Ćosić
- Goran Čučković
- Slobodan Ćurčić
- Ljubomir Damnjanović
- Vladan Desnica
- An Dim (pseudonym)
- Bran. Dimitrijević
- Vladan Dobrivojević
- Radoje Domanović
- Milan Drašković
- Rastislav Durman
- Momir Đerić
- Dejan Đorđević
- Slobodan Đorđević
- Dušan Đorić
- Radivoje Lola Đukić
- Mirjana Đurđević
- Vladimir Đurić
- Dragan R. Filipović
- Milovan Glišić
- Zoran Grbić
- Dragan Hajduković
- Aleksandar Ilić
- Dragutin Ilić
- Milivoje Ilić
- Žarko Ilić
- Vladimir Imperl, alias Vil Mardi
- Ivan Ivanji
- Slobodan Ivkov
- Zoran Jakšić
- Milorad Janković
- Ana Jezerska
- Ljubiša Jocić
- Ljubiša Jovanović
- Milan Jovanović
- Milivoje Jovanović
- Nebojša Jovanović
- Vladimir Jovanović
- Boban Knežević
- Lazar Komarčić
- Berislav Kosier
- Zvonimir Kostić
- Erih Koš
- Ranko Krstajić
- Boško Krstić
- Srđan Krstić
- Stanko Kukić
- Vladimir Lazović
- Tamara Lujak
- Dušica Lukić
- Radovan M. Janković
- Aleksandar Mandić
- Aleksandar Manić
- Aleksandar Marković
- Slobodan Marković
- Veselin Marković
- Zoran N. Marković
- Živorad Mihailović
- Jasmina Mihajlović
- Đorđe Mijušković
- Milutin Milanković
- Miodrag Milovanović
- Milan Mitrović
- Nemanja Mitrović
- Slobodan Nenin
- Ivan Nešić
- Brana Nikolić
- Milan Nikolić
- Mirjana Novaković
- Stojan Novaković
- Željko Obrenović
- Dejan Ognjanović
- Oto Oltvanji
- Oliver Jovanović
- Dragan Orlović
- Ivan Panić
- Nikola Panić
- Arsen Panković
- Milorad Pavić
- Zoran Pavlović
- Darko Pejović
- Borislav Pekić
- Miodrag Pepić
- Božidar Pešev
- Zoran Pešić Sigma
- Slobodan Petković
- Miomir Petrović
- Rastko Petrović
- Uroš Petrović
- Đorđe Pisarev
- Jovan Sterija Popović
- Zoran Popović
- Ljiljana Praizović
- Ljubomir Prelić
- Jovan Prešić
- Aleksandar Radenković (Al Radek)
- Stojan J. Radonić
- Saša Radonjić
- Lee Radov (pseudonym)
- Slaven Radovanović
- Ratko Radunović
- Svetolik Ranković
- Bojan Ratković
- Manojlo Ratković
- Daniel Reljić
- Adrijan Sarajlija
- Goran Skrobonja
- Nikola Smolenski
- Dragan Stanišić
- Goran Stanković
- Miloš Stanojević
- Spomenka Stefanović-Pululu
- Zoran Stefanović
- Atanasije Stojković
- Gradimir Stojković
- Vojislav Stojković
- Bojan Stojnić
- Slobodan Škerović
- Persida Šujica Milačić
- Danijela Tanasković
- Konstantin Tezeus (pseudonym)
- Gordana Timotijević
- Mina D. Todorović
- Miroljub Todorović
- Vladimir Todorović
- Majo Topolovac
- Risto Trifković
- Predrag Urošević
- Apostol Vanđelović alias Vovjekivjeković
- Vladimir Velmar-Janković
- Milutin Veljković
- Stanislav Vinaver
- Aleksandar Vojinović
- Jelena Vučetić
- Radomir Vuga
- Mijat Vujačić
- Ivan Vukadinović
- Čeda Vuković
- Divna Vuksanović
- Mirna Zakić
- Pavle Zelić
- Radovan Ždrale
- Zoran Živković

== Artists ==
- Marko Đurđević
- Aleksa Gajić
- Borivoje Grbić
- Branislav Kerac
- Dražen Kovačević
- Zoran Janjetov
- Željko Pahek
- Darko Perović
- Vujadin Radovanović
- Rade Tovladijac
- Zoran Tucić
- Dobrosav Bob Živković

== Societies ==
- Photon Tide (http://www.photontide.org)
- SF Team (http://www.sftim.com)
- Lazar Komarčić (http://www.lazarkomarcic.org.yu)
- KONEF (http://www.konef.org.yu)
- Sci&Fi (http://www.sciencefiction.org.rs)
- Serbian Society for Science Fiction (http://www.sciencefiction.org.rs)

== See also ==
- Yugoslav science fiction
