= Ratko Adamović =

Serbian writer

Ratko Adamović (Serbian-Cyrillic: Ратко Адамовић; born 10 October 1942 in Knin) is a Serbian writer. Died in Belgrade on June 20th, 2025.

== Life and work ==
Adamović studied comparative literature at the Philological Faculty in Belgrade. The writer was long-serving official of the Association of Writers of Serbia for several decades. He is author of fourteen novels, four volumes of collected short stories and essays, created in the period from 1971 to 2016. The collection Gardens of Spirit (U vrtovima duha) contains essays on Marguerite Yourcenar, Fernand Braudel, Béla Hamvas, John Cowper Powys, Alexander Genis, Paul Virilio, Daniel J. Boorstin, Gaston Bachelard, Isaac Bashevis Singer, Jacques Le Goff, Paulo Coelho, Christoph Ransmayr and others. He received the Isidora Sekulić Award 1997 for his novel Immortal Kaleb (Besmrtni Kaleb); was President of its Jury from 2009 to 2016. He is recipient of the artists supporting program National Pension of the Republic of Serbia (Nacionalna penzija Republike Srbije) since 2012. His novel Rope (Konopac) has been published in Polish (1982), three of his short stories in German (1979), Lithuanian (1992) and English anthologies (1998). His work is often associated with Serbian science fiction.

In his online biography, he did not name his place of birth, but in the e-book collection of his edited works by Agencija Tea Books (available at Google Books) is Sarajevo given, which does not correspond to the facts. In any case, he was participant of a political-cultural event in his real birthplace in July 1990, which became capital of the Republic of Serbian Krajina a year later. During the NATO bombing of Yugoslavia in 1999, he obviously talked to an Australian journalist in Klub književnika about Kosovo, published by Green Left Weekly with the headline: Sexism and Racism in the Balkans. He is a member of Serbian PEN and lives in Belgrade.

== Bibliography (selection) ==
- Erkundungen : 28 jugoslawische Erzähler, anthology, edited by Barbara Antkowiak, Volk und Welt, East-Berlin 1979.
- Serbų novelės (Serbian novellas), anthology, Vaga, Vilnius 1992, ISBN 978-5-415-00691-5.
- Karavan Saraj (Caravanserai), short stories, Beogradski izdavačko-grafički zavod, Belgrade 1993, ISBN 86-13-00671-X.
- The Prince of Fire : anthology of contemporary Serbian short stories, edited by Radmila J. Gorup and Nadežda Obradović, University of Pittsburgh Press 1998, ISBN 978-0-8229-4058-6.
- U vrtovima duha (Gardens of Spirit), essays, Prosveta, Belgrade 2002, ISBN 86-0701-324-6.
- Akademija noći (School of Night), novel, Narodna knjiga–Alfa, Belgrade 2003, ISBN 86-331-1239-6.
