= Association of Writers of Serbia =

Serbia's official writing association

- Удружење књижевника Србије; Udruženje književnika Srbije
- Founded: 26 May 1905; 120 years ago
- Headquarters: Francuska 7 Street, Belgrade
- Location: Serbia
- Key people: Miloš Janković (president)
- Website: uksrbije.org.rs

The Association of Writers of Serbia (Serbian: Удружење књижевника Србије, Udruženje književnika Srbije) is Serbia's official writing association. Its current president is Miloš Janković.

== History ==
The association was founded on 26 May 1905. Its founders and first members were Aleksandar Belić, Borivoje Popović, Dobrosav Ružić, Dragomir Janković, Dragoljub Pavlović, Dragutin Ilić, Živojin Dačić, Jovan Skerlić, Lujo Vojnović, Ljubomir Jovanović, Milan Milićević, Milovan Glišić, Milorad Mitrović, Milorad Pavlović-Krpa, Nikola Vulić, Pavle Popović, Petar Odavić, Radoje Domanović, Rista Odavić, Simo Matavulj (as president) and Stanoje Stanojević.

=== Post-WWII ===
Association was re-established after the liberation of Belgrade on the meeting which took place on 31 December 1944. Notable signatories to the initiative included Isidora Sekulić, Ivo Andrić, Jovan Popović, Milan Vukasović, Branko Lazarević and others. Isidora Sekulić was elected as the first post-war president while Oskar Davičo was its first secretary. Association brought together authors who joined or supported Yugoslav Partisans and those who did not collaborate with Axis or local quislings during the Axis occupation of Serbia and the rest of Yugoslavia. In addition to its cultural and social role, association started to play prominent role as a writers' syndicalist organization. It established two separate regional sections for the Socialist Autonomous Province of Vojvodina and Socialist Autonomous Province of Kosovo, second of which declared its intention to constitute itself as an independent organization in 1970.

As a result of the Slovene Writers' Association's support of the 1989 Kosovo miners' strike, the UKS broke off its relations with the Slovene Writers' Association.

== Mission ==
The Association of Writers of Serbia states its main goals as gathering Serbian authors in the same community, protecting the professional interests of its members, working on their interpersonal relationships, working on relations with publishers and the general public, making their job(s) easier and helping its members or their families who are in poverty.

== Presidents ==
- Simo Matavulj (1905–1911)
- Borisav Stanković (1911–1914)
- No activities during the First World War
- Branislav Nušić (1918–1937)
- Veljko Petrović (1937–1941)
- No activities during the Second World War
- Isidora Sekulić
- Jovan Popović
- Dragan M. Jeremić
- Miodrag Bulatović
- Matija Bećković (1988–1992)
- Jovan Hristić (1992–1994)
- Slobodan Rakitić (1994–2005)
- Srba Ignjatović (2005–2010)
- Radomir Andrić (2010–2018)
- Milovan Vitezović (2018–2022)
- Miloš Janković (2023–present)

== See also ==
- Klub književnika
- Serbian Literary Guild
- Association of Writers of Yugoslavia
- Association of Writers of Vojvodina
