= Vesna Sekulić =

Serbian writer and physician

- Весна Секулић
- Born: 7 November 1953; Topola, SFR Yugoslavia
- Occupations: Writer, poet, doctor

Vesna Sekulić (Serbian Cyrillic: Весна Секулић; born 1953), is a Serbian writer, poet and doctor. She finished elementary and high school in Belgrade and graduated at the University of Belgrade Faculty of Medicine. Vesna is a general practitioner, acupuncturist and nutritionist. She lives and works in Belgrade. Vesna has been writing poems and short stories since her school days.

== Career ==
So far, she has published eight books of poems. One of them is a book of poems for children and two are books of short stories. Her poems and stories have been published in over thirty anthologies, both domestic and international. She received awards and praises for her work. She is a member of the Association of Writers of Serbia, U.P. "The Poet", U.K. "Zenit" from Podgorica and former president of the "Vidar" association of doctors and writers.
