= Photon Tide =

Science fiction society

Photon Tide is a science fiction society from Novi Sad, Serbia. They held a first ever Star Trek convention in Serbia, featured in a documentary film "Trekkies 2".

== History ==
Formed in 1997 as a small informal Trekkie club, steadily growing in numbers, which warranted its chartering as a NGO in 2002. In 2003, the filming crew of "Trekkies 2" documentary visited Serbia to film Star Trek fans. Fans from several Balkan states converged to Novi Sad to attend the first-ever Star Trek convention in this part of the world, "TREK>NS", organized by Photon Tide. Denise Crosby of ST:TNG fame, star and narrator of "Trekkies 2", was the special guest of this convention.

In 2006, Photon Tide was included in the program of the Exit music festival, co-hosting the special "Supernova" stage with "Lazar Komarcic" fiction fan club from Belgrade, Serbia. The stage program was devoted to science fiction in Serbia. Photon Tide also took part in the final tournament of World Cyber Games 2006 in Belgrade, holding a stand along with several other Serbian science fiction societies.

== Activities ==
The society publishes its fanzine "Nova" as an insert to the monthly science magazine "Astronomija" (Astronomy), reaching readers in Serbia and other former Yugoslav republics. The Photon Tide website (in Serbian) is a source of science fiction news in Serbian, and its bulletins are being syndicated by several news aggregator websites. A science fiction workshop is in development, aimed to provide means for creative teamwork of talented people, creating their own science-fiction-themed comics, animations, amateur movies, short stories and radio dramas.

There are also somewhat regular get-togethers and outdoor activities, either open-attendance or organized exclusively for the Photon Tide members, which take place all over Serbia. Aside from online communication, open fan meetings are the most persistent form of organized effort, taking place since the society's inception in 1997. They are most frequent in Novi Sad and Belgrade, where the majority of members are located.

== See also ==
Science fiction in Serbia
