= Jovan Ilić =

Serbian poet and politician

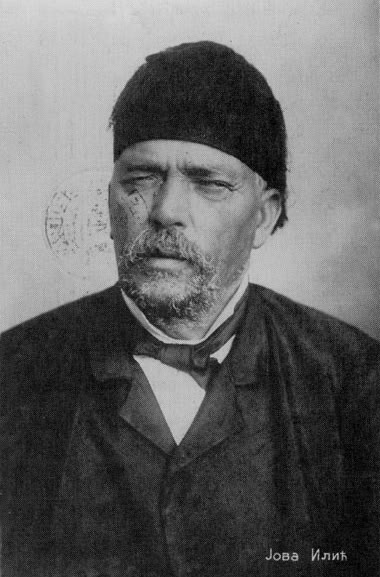

Minister of Justice Principality of Serbia
- In office 1869–1871
- Monarch: Milan Obrenović
- Preceded by: Đorđe Cenić
- Succeeded by: Stojan Veljković

Personal details
- Born: 15 August 1824 Resnik, Principality of Serbia
- Died: March 12, 1901 (aged 76) Belgrade, Kingdom of Serbia
- Children: Vojislav Ilić, Dragutin Ilić
- Education: Licej Kneževine Srbije
- Occupation: politician, poet, writer

Jovan "Jova" Ilić (Belgrade, 15 August 1824 – Belgrade, 12 March 1901) was a Serbian poet and politician.

== Biography ==
Ilić's father was a merchant who arrived in Belgrade from Niš and married Stana, a woman from Podgorica. His business thrived and after his death, his fortune was large enough to pay for Jovan's education. Ilić and his wife Smiljana had seven children, four boys, and three girls, but only one girl lived to adulthood, the other two girls died as toddlers. The four boys followed in their father's footsteps, taking up literature as their life's work. Vojislav Ilić was later recognized as the preeminent poet of his day; Milutin, Dragutin and Žarko wrote books and were well known in their own right.

Jovan Ilić belonged to the first generation of Serbian university students (Petar Protić-Skopljanin, Jevrem Grujić, Milovan Janković, Dimitrije Milaković, Dimitrije Petrović, Jovan Ristić, Ljubomir P. Nenadović, etc.) from Turkish-occupied Serbian territories who studied abroad, and returned home bringing the European ideals of democracy, constitutionalism, nationalism, Pan-Slavism, and civil liberties. Ilić, like many of his peers, participated in founding the "Association of Serbian Youth" (the first founding president was Jevrem Grujić), a group that nurtured and disseminated ideas of liberal ethnic nationalism and Slavic unity. During 1848 the society developed from an ordinary literary group into a strong association of secondary school and lyceum students as well as university students and graduates from all over the Austrian Empire. The association was modeled after revolutionary and literary youth organizations of the past two or three decades (since the founding of Matica srpska in Budapest in 1825). Ilić was sensitive to the revolutionary vibrations of the time; he cooperated with the Serbian youth movement under Habsburg yoke and participated in the events of 1848 in Vojvodina where Serbian demands for collective rights came to clash with Hungarian liberal nationalist revolutionaries who sought to combine their emancipation with national homogenization. In the Association of Serbian Youth's first publication "Neven-Sloga," Ilić published a poem called "Slava" in which he wrote: "I am a Serb of the Slavic race; my heart is longing for a new Slavic life. O Slavs, dear brothers, our hour has come."

With Ranko Alimpić, Jevrem Grujić, and others he formed a revolutionary group in 1858, the "Liberal Club", which advocated for independence. They played an important role in the St. Andrew's Day Assembly in 1858 when the call for a parliamentary check on monarchic power for the first time gained support. Through their collective effort, the ideas of Slavic brotherhood were intertwined with the doctrines of liberalism. The generation of liberals in Serbia, which emerged in the late-1840s and 1850s, believed that individual freedom and the 'progress of the nation' could be secured through the institution of parliamentary representation.

His poetry was first influenced by classical poetry and later by the national epic poetry of the time. Jovan Ilić was a cabinet minister and a member of the Privy Council (Državni Savet).

He died in Belgrade on 12 March 1901.

== Works ==
- Pesme, Belgrade, 1854
- Pesme (II), Novi Sad, 1858
- Pastiri, Belgrade, 1868
- Tapija, Belgrade, 1879
- Dahire, Belgrade, 1891
- Pesme (III), Belgrade, 1894
- Kratka istorija Grka i Turaka za mladež, Belgrade, 1853
- Pogled na sadašnje stanje naše, Belgrade, 1859
- Srpska Pismenica, Novi Sad, 1860
- Pogled na sadašnje stanje naše, Belgrade, 1859
- Srpska Pismenica, Novi Sad 1860

== See also ==
- Vojislav Ilić
- Dragutin Ilić

Government offices
Preceded by Đorđe Cenić	Minister of Justice of Serbia; 1869–1871	Succeeded by Stojan Veljković
