= Klub književnika, Belgrade =

Restaurant in Belgrade, Serbia

Klub književnika (Serbian Cyrillic: Клуб књижевника) (The Writers' Club) is a Serbian restaurant (kafana) located in downtown Belgrade.

Founded in 1946 as the Serbian Writers' Association's (UKS) eatery, over time, the club managed to develop a unique identity outside of its umbrella organization. Originally only accessible to association members who had to show their cards to get in, it eventually became open to the general public. The restaurant is located in the basement of a neoclassical building at 7 Francuska Street, which also houses the Writers Association upstairs.

Special part of Klub književnika's lore are its famous patrons. In addition to an endless list of Serbian and Yugoslav writers who frequented the restaurant over the years such as Momo Kapor, Bogdan Tirnanić, Ivo Andrić, Danilo Kiš, Dobrica Ćosić, Miodrag Bulatović, Matija Bećković, Miroslav Krleža, Miloš Crnjanski, Borislav Mihajlović Mihiz, Duško Radović, Predrag Palavestra, Mirko Kovač, Zuko Džumhur, Borislav Pekić, etc., Klub književnika was often visited by various other artists, politicians, journalists, and diplomats.

== Location ==
The 7 Francuska Street building where the restaurant is located was erected during the late 1850s by a wealthy Serbian merchant named Pećanac.

The building later housed the Turkish embassy, then the American embassy before eventually becoming the Auto Club during interbellum.

== History ==
Established in 1946, Klub književnika initially served as hangout for writers from the association upstairs who used the basement facilities for literary presentations and book promotions. At first only coffee, and occasionally fruit snacks, were served. Sometime in 1952 the menu expanded to include simple soups and salads as food now began to be served on regular basis.

Two years later, in 1954, the club opened its doors to the general public. Managed at the time by Ivo Kusalić and Nikola Bosanac it quickly established itself as the place to be among the country's main decision makers, and thus began to be frequented by top Yugoslav communist political and military officials such as the foreign minister Koča Popović, Rodoljub Čolaković, Draža Marković, general Peko Dapčević, etc.

In 1957 with the arrival of Budimir "Buda" Blagojević to the management team, the restaurant got the recognizable duo of Buda and Ivo that would run the place in hands-on manner for the following 30+ years. It would only open at night (operating six days a week, closed on Sundays) with first patrons usually slowly arriving around 8pm.

In addition to writers and politicians, the smoke-filled basement facility proved popular with various artists - painters, sculptors, actors, and film directors. Since the demand far outstripped the seating capacity of its facilities, getting a table at Klub književnika became a matter of prestige. Actors Ljubinka Bobić, Jovan Milićević, Ljubiša Jovanović, Zoran Radmilović, Bata Stojković, Olivera Katarina, film directors Žorž Skrigin, Vojislav Nanović, and Radoš Novaković, painters Dragan Malešević Tapi, Petar Lubarda and Milo Milunović, academician Pavle Savić were a regular sight at the club. So were foreign intellectuals, artists and actors when in town — Alberto Moravia as well as Simone de Beauvoir and her partner Jean-Paul Sartre were all regular visitors. Restaurant would especially see a lot of famous foreigners during festivals such as FEST, BITEF, or BEMUS so that Alfred Hitchcock, Orson Welles, Vivien Leigh, Elizabeth Taylor, Richard Burton, Czesław Miłosz, Samuel Beckett, Oriana Fallaci, Marlon Brando, Jean-Claude Pascal, Monica Vitti, Maria Schneider, Silvana Mangano, Rod Taylor, Sofia Loren, Gianni Agnelli, Günter Grass, Burt Lancaster, Robert De Niro, among others, visited Klub književnika.

The restaurant was often the site of fierce debate. Therefore, like other famous kafane in communist Yugoslavia, Klub književnika also featured police informants dressed in civilian clothing, mingling in with other patrons, listening to vox populi and reporting potentially incendiary talk and ideas to their higher ups. In his NIN column from 2009, Momo Kapor wrote about his fellow writer and drinking buddy Miodrag Bulatović getting detained in 1966 after an informant at Klub književnika reported Bulatović for "criticizing the economic reforms introduced in 1964". On occasion, a quarrel between writers themselves would cross the line. The fist fight that erupted at Klub književnika between Danilo Kiš and Branimir "Brana" Šćepanović is still talked about.

As the 1980s rolled around, and Yugoslavia moved into its post-Tito period, Klub književnika became one of the regular meeting points for politically inclined scholars and dissidents pushing for the abolishment of the one-party system many of whom would later go on to notable careers in politics such as Zoran Đinđić, Vojislav Koštunica, Vuk Drašković, Vojislav Šešelj, etc. The club also saw many academicians from the Serbian Academy of Sciences and Arts (SANU) who around this time wrote the controversial 1986 Memorandum. The club was also a regular stop for Western intelligence operatives and diplomatic staff. US diplomats Lawrence Eagleberger and Warren Zimmermann were frequent visitors to Klub književnika. Reportedly, visits from Western journalists and diplomats were often accompanied by Yugoslav state security operatives who would on those occasions also show up at the restaurant with clandestine listening devices.

Ivo Kusalić died in 1989 and Buda Blagojević became the restaurant's eventual sole owner and operator.

During the Yugoslav Wars of the 1990s, Serbia was under a UN embargo, all of which had a significant effect on the restaurant's clientele. Local gangsters and criminals were suddenly a regular sight at the iconic restaurant. Warlord and crime boss Željko "Arkan" Ražnatović often dined here with his turbofolk star wife Ceca. In the early morning hours of 15 February 1997, another well-known career gangster 46-year-old Rade "Ćenta" Ćaldović was murdered in his Renault Espace parked in front of Klub književnika along with his 24-year-old girlfriend Maja Pavić, presenter on TV Pink and Ceca's maid-of-honour at hers and Arkan's wedding. Several hours earlier the couple enjoyed a dinner at Klub književnika to celebrate the Valentine's Day before continuing on to nightclub F6 down the street.

In early summer 2008 Buda Blagojević decided to sell Klub književnika's ownership rights to Zoran "Brija" Lazarević (well known Belgrade restaurateur and owner of Madera and Kalmegdanska terasa) after managing the club in various capacities for over 50 years. The restaurant underwent major renovation in the second half of 2008 under Lazarević's ownership. Once the club reopened, some changes were in order as the place now began opening every day at noon, and it even started opening on Sundays at 6pm. Also, famous octogenarian Buda Blagojević continued to be involved with the club, but in smaller capacity.

In June 2010, the restaurant was in the news when 31-year-old Serbian actress Katarina Radivojević got thrown out by restaurant security after reportedly behaving unruly and breaking several glasses.

The restaurant's longtime operator Buda Blagojević died on 19 August 2012 at the age of eighty three.
