= Jovan Hristić =

Serbian poet

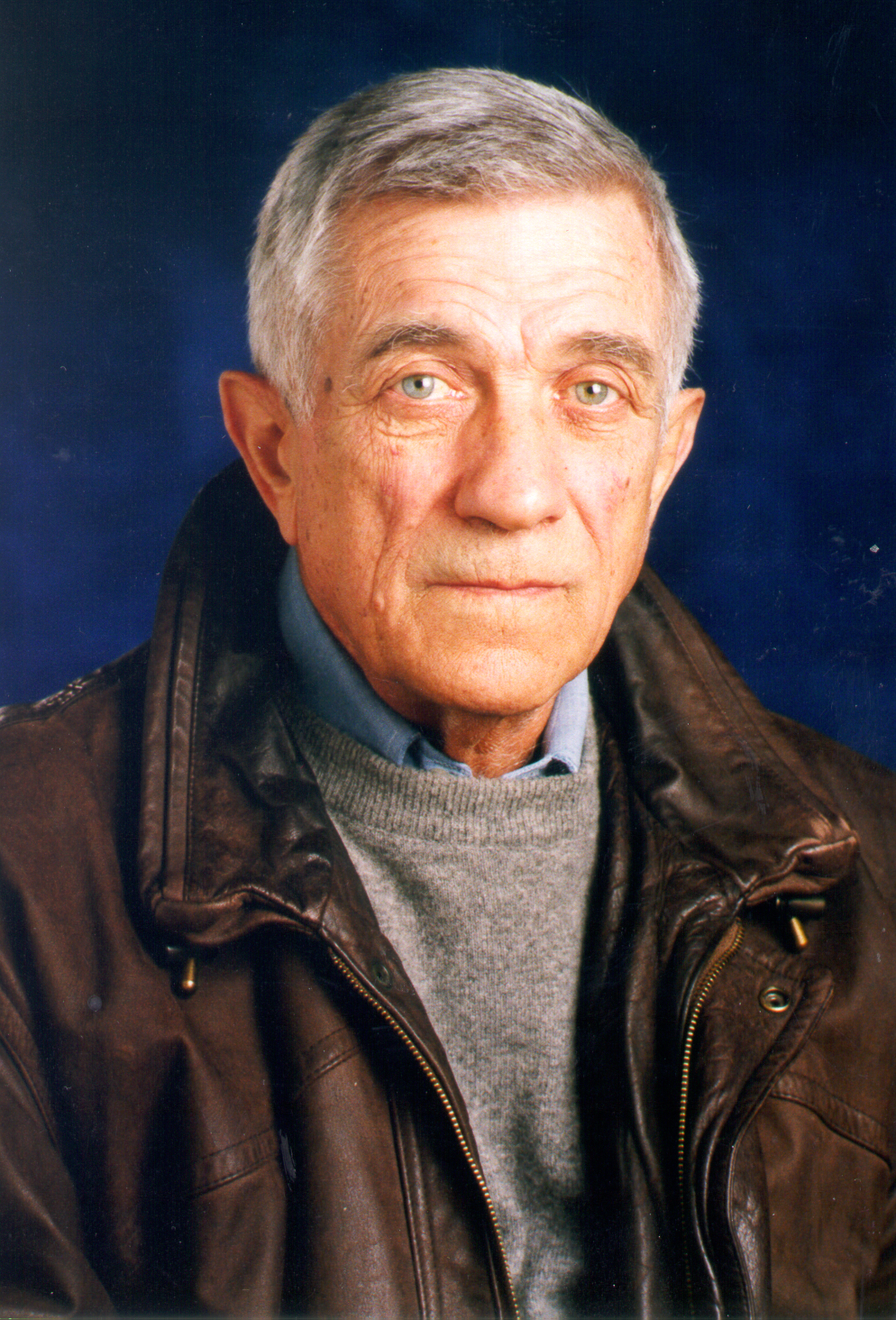
- Jovan Vava Hristić
- Born: 26 August 1933; Belgrade, Kingdom of Yugoslavia
- Died: 20 June 2002 (aged 68); Sremska Kamenica, FR Yugoslavia
- Education: University of Belgrade
- Occupation: Playwright • Professor
- Writing career
- Language: Serbian

Jovan Hristić (Serbian Cyrillic: Јован Христић; 26 August 1933 - 20 June 2002) was a Serbian poet, playwright, essayist, literary and theater critic, translator, editor of Literature, Danas and editor at IRO Nolit.

== Biography ==
Jovan Hristić was born on 26 August 1933 in Belgrade. Jovan Hristić was the great-grandson of Filip Hristić, named after his son Jovan Hristić.

He graduated from the Second Men's Gymnasium, together with Slobodan Selenić. He studied architecture and philosophy. He graduated from the Faculty of Philosophy in 1958. He was a full professor at the Faculty of Dramatic Arts and taught dramaturgy to all generations since 1967.

Hristić was an advocate of modern Serbian lyrics. In drama, he tried to speak through well-known characters from the classics about the eternal problems that plague modern man. In the essay, he examined modern phenomena and forms in literature and art.

He was the winner of two Sterija Awards for Drama, Sterija Awards for Theatrology, Isidora Sekulic Award for Criticism, Djordje Jovanovic Award for Criticism, Milan Rakic Award, and the Pavle Bihalji Bookstore Award for Best Poetry Book of the Year 1993, as well as the Nolit, Borbina and Vinaver awards. In August 2001, he received the "Stjepan Mitrov Ljubiša International Award".

He died in Sremska Kamenica on June 20, 2002.

== Works ==
Poetry books:

- The Ulysses Diary (1954)
- Poems 1952-1959 (1959)
- Alexandrian School (1963)
- Old and new songs (1988)
- New and latest songs (1993)
- Collected Poems (1996),
- Collected Poems (2002)
- U tavni čas - posthumno (2003)

Drama:

- Clean Hands (1961)
- Orestes (1961)
- Savonarola and his friends (1965)
- Seven: Today (1968)
- Terrace (1972)

Books of criticism, study and review:

- Poetry and the Critique of Poetry (1957)
- Poetry and Philosophy (1964)
- Forms of Modern Literature (1968)
- Theater, Theater (1977)
- Chekhov, playwright (1981)
- Theater, Theater II (1982)
- Drama Studies (1986)
- Theatre Papers (1992)
- Essays (1994)
- Theater Papers II (1996)
- About tragedy (1998)
- On the Search for Theater (2002)
- Selected Essays - Posthumous (2005)

Critical prose:

- Professor of Mathematics and Other Essays (1988)
- Professor of Mathematics and Other Essays (1997)
- Terrace on two seas - posthumously (2002)

== Sources ==
- Marko Magarašević, "Lights of Literature", Belgrade, Idea, 1991.
- Jovan Ćirilov, "Playwrights, My Contemporaries: Portraits", Novi Sad, Sterijino pozorje, 1989.
- Radomir Putnik, "Čitajući iznova: ogledi iz dramaturgije i teatrologije," Novi Sad, Sterijino pozorje, 1990.
- Slobodan Rakitić, "Poet Jovan Hristić", Književne novine, year 43, no. 790. pp. 14
- Petar Milosavljević, "Tradition and Avant-Garde", Novi Sad, Matica srpska, 1968.
- Mihajlo Pantić, "Man is not alone in his feelings", Književne novine, year 42, no. 779. pp. 12-13
- Gordan M. Maričić, "Antički motivi u dramama Jovana Hristića i Velimira Lukića", Ph.D. thesis, Belgrade, 1999.
