= Dragoljub Pavlović =

Serbian artist

Dragoljub Pavlović (1875–1956) was an academic painter, appointed by the Supreme Command as a war artist and photographer. Son of the Metropolitan Inokentije Pavlović of Serbia. He was embedded with the Serbian Supreme Command in Greece where he captured through photography and painting battle scenes of the Salonika front.

== Biography ==
He came from a distinguished clerical family. His father Jakob upon the death of his wife became a monk and as Inokentije Pavlović (1840-1905) was elevated to archbishop of Belgrade and Metropolitan of Serbia from 1898 until his death in 1905. Meanwhile, his son Dragoljub Pavlović graduated from an icon-painting school in the Trinity Lavra of St. Sergius in the town of Sergiyev Posad near Moscow and the Academy of Fine Arts in Munich and later worked as a professor at the Theological Faculty of Saint Sava of the Serbian Orthodox Church in Belgrade. As a war artist and a photo-journalist, Pavlović documented the wars from 1912 to 1918, particularly the defence of Belgrade in 1914, as well as those scenes from the Salonika front.

Photos from the Macedonian front documented the positions of the Serbian forces in the stretch of the Danube Division, where Pavlović was based, from 1916 until 1918. His amazing records show all major military operations and places that witnessed crucial historical events, such as battles, in the wider area of the Gornicevo, the capture of Kajmakčalan on 30 September 1916, a battle at Crna River harbour and the liberation of Monastir and Bitola on 19 November 1916.

Due to the transition to trench warfare, from 1917 he created abundant recordings relating to historical figures, volunteers, military equipment, medical services, church services, geographical and ethnographical features of the region that highlight life at the front.

The breakthrough of the Salonika front from 14 to 21 September 1918 is reflected in the view of strategic spots, capturing Bulgarian officers and soldiers and marches on the Veles-Skopje stretch. Success resulted in the liberation of Serbia and Montenegro and the future Yugoslav ethnic area, but the losses were enormous—42,725 persons killed or wounded during the Thessaloniki offensive.

Dragoljub Pavlović belongs to the circle of our last war painters and photographers for which he was awarded many medals. In addition to the artwork, he photographed many battlefield events relevant to history and of great documentary value, and after the war, he organized three exhibitions of these photographs. He was president of the group of painters called "Lada", the Serbian Artists Association, and president of the Association of Artists of the Kingdom of Serbs, Croats, and Slovenes.

There are still numerous shots from the 1912-1918 wars, as part of the archive, most notably including his diary and several works of art by Dragoljub Pavlović himself.
