= Miha Remec =

Slovenian author (1928–2020)

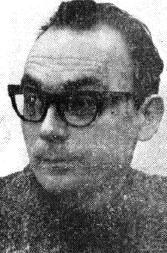
- Born: August 10, 1928
- Died: 2020 (aged 91–92)
- Occupation: Author

Miha Remec [míha rémec, IPA mˈiha ɹeːmet͡s] (born August 10, 1928 in Ptuj, Kingdom of Serbs, Croats and Slovenes (now Slovenia), died 2020) was a Slovene author known for his science fiction works. He was a two-time winner of the SFERA Award.

== Novels ==
- Stone of Truth (1957)
- Solstice (1969)
- Cave: Night Among Modern Slovene Dormouse Hunters (1977)
- Recognition: White Widows Dark Hours (1980)
- Iksion: Escape from the Stage (1981)
- Mana: Chronological Records of the Journalist Jurij Jereb (1985)
- The Big Carriage (1986)
- Green Covenant (1989)
- Dandelion Fluff in Space (1989)
- Trapan Chronographies (1997)

== Collections ==
- Stories from Dragon's Castle (1957)
- Poems from Left Pocket (1981)
- Hunter and Unclean Daughter (1987)
- Astral Lighthouses (1993)

== See also ==
- List of Slovenians
- Science fiction authors
