= Besnilo =

1983 novel by Borislav Pekić

Rabies
- Author: Borislav Pekić
- Original title: Besnilo
- Language: Serbian
- Genre: Horror, Thriller
- Publisher: Sveučilišna naklada Liber
- Publication date: 1983
- Publication place: Yugoslavia
- Media type: Print book (Hardback and Paperback)

Besnilo (in English: Rabies), published in 1983, is a thriller-horror novel by the Serbian author Borislav Pekić. The author has, within the framework or those genres, set up many of the ideas he had been working on in his previous published opus. The 1983 novel's plot revolves around the outbreak of an extremely virulent form of rabies, introduced to the London Heathrow Airport by a puppy smuggled from Israel on an Alitalia jet headed for New York City. Due to the mutated nature of the virus, its incubation period has been reduced to hours instead of weeks or months, and its method of transmission now follows more closely that of the flu. Through multiple plot-lines, the story follows subjects as diverse as détente, espionage, the Israeli–Palestinian conflict, and many others.

== Plot summary ==
Set in the early 1980s, during the height of Cold War, the novel follows a series of parallel storylines. The situation at Heathrow Airport is tense, due to the arrival of the Soviet delegation, led by the Soviet Minister of Foreign Affairs Artamonov. Heathrow VIP lounge is where they and British Foreign Minister Sir Geoffrey Drummond, are to conclude the signing of a new Anglo-Soviet treaty.

Whilst tight security is being deployed by the head of the Aviation Security, Major Lawford, along with his colleagues: Colonels Donovan of the MI6 and Rasimov of the KGB, the Heathrow Medical Centre, headed by Dr. Luke Komarovsky, becomes informed that a nun from a convent near Lagos Nigeria, who was travelling on the Alitalia Boeing 747 en route to New York City via Heathrow, has become ill. Her symptoms are first diagnosed as those of hysteria caused by fear of flying, then to an epileptic seizure. The plane is given a priority landing.

Dr. Komarowsky, who in the past has been a scientist, was working, along with three other doctors, each of whom will make an appearance later in the book: Dr. John Hamilton, Dr. Matthew Laverick, and Dr. Coro Deveroux, in a team headed by the microbiologist Dr. Frederick Lieberman. Their work in a laboratory at Wolfenden House is veiled in mystery, but their goal (four of them were called either the nucleus or evangelists of Messiah Lieberman) was the 'holy grail' of microbiology - creation, through genetic reorganisation, of general immunity to bacterial, viral and oncological diseases. Based on genetic modification of human DNA this is intended to become hereditary. However, the most recent batch of experiments, with a vaccine based on recombined Rabies virus, were performed on humans who were exposed to the rabies virus during quarantine in Britain. The human trial ended horribly, accelerating, instead of providing post-exposure immunity of the vaccination, and even though the patients were well outside of the window when any rabies vaccine available on the market would be able to save them from developing symptoms. This event leads to Luke Komarowsky abandoning the field of virology and science altogether, and puts him in his present position of the head of the Heathrow Airport medical unit.

The nun, after landing and quick examination, does not show the symptoms of a generalised tonic-clonic seizure. The baffled Dr. Komarowsky decides on the diagnosis of a malaria with cerebral complications. As a precaution, he isolates the nun in the medical center, and the airplane passengers in the transit lounge of Terminal 2. The measure fails. Airport Security, not being informed of the reason for the presence, and focusing on the arrival of the Soviet diplomatic contingent, clears out the lounge and moves the passengers into the general transit. The sole passenger whose destination was London, a Cologne bank director, is murdered by one of the bank's disgruntled employees in the Terminal 2 parking area. Soon, the nun who was escorting Mother Theresa, now isolated in the intensive care unit, begins showing symptoms, followed by the Alitalia Stewardess who was administering aid to the nun on the plane, and a nurse who got bitten by nun Theresa when she tried to give her warm water for rehydration. The developing medical crisis leads Dr. Komarowsky to contacts his former Wolfenden House colleague, Dr. Hamilton, from the Institute for the Infectious Diseases. Hamilton diagnoses the patients as suffering from an extremely virulent strain of rabies. The incubation period of less than two hours is something never seen before. The mode of transmission is also unclear. The four patients have either scrapes or bites, which is to be expected. Then the doctors of the medical service, dispatched to the Transit of the Terminal 2 after a brawl has erupted there, reports that he found some of the brawlers showing signs of epileptiform seizures. Realization that the isolation measure of Dr. Komarowsky has been breached, opens up the possibility of an epidemiological disaster at the Heathrow Airport.

The committee of people responsible for running all the aspects of the airport quickly gathers as the 'Anti-Rabies committee'. They impose a strict quarantine on the medical center and the transit of Terminal 2, and general quarantine of the entire Terminal 2. Cases begin appearing rapidly, whilst Dr. Hamilton, who has received all the necessary supplies from London, to create a world class microbiology laboratory in the Control Tower of the airport, and epidemiological teams from all over the world start arriving. One of them consists of Dr. Coro Deveroux, and Dr. Lieberman (now using the surname Lohman, and who has disappeared following the incident at his Wolfenden House laboratory). Dr. Hamilton comes to a further realization: the virus is nothing like any other rabies virus seen before, for not only is it extremely virulent and replicates at an alarming rate, it is a mutant strain that has an additional layer covering its viral envelope - something against which no existing rabies vaccination will have any effect on.

As the outbreak spirals out of control, the remaining doctors - Komarowsky, Deveroux, Hamilton and Lieberman, and a select list of other people, including the writer on whose notes the novel is supposedly based are locked in the tower which has been turned into a fortress. The people trying to escape realize that the whole of the airport has been blocked by the units of the British Army, who have orders shoot to kill anyone approaching the perimeter. Dr. Lieberman, who, hiding behind a supposed Jewish background, is in reality a former SS doctor Siegfried Stadler, who headed the plan of improving the mankind on genetic level, and worked directly for Himmler in Auschwitz. He is, except for a small group of Jewish survivors or rather their offspring, for no one survived his experiments, completely unknown to history (he was never photographed, the couple hundred deaths his experiments led to are attributed to Mengele and other medical personnel in the camp). Also, he is not antisemitic, for he considers the entirety of humanity as being beneath what they could truly accomplish once they set their genes in order, and worked on Jews because they were the only material available to him. He quickly discovers that the virus is one of his recombinates of the rabies virus, which he has selected to be the mechanism of the delivery of his 'serum', that will recombinate human into a 'titan', the übermensch of Nietzsche. His disappearance was due to the Jewish survivors catching his trail following Wolfenden incident, and who has now been working in Syria, in theory helping them to develop a bioweapons program, in reality, continuing his work started in Auschwitz, and continued at Wolfendenn (he states that, had Israel shown interest, he would have worked for them). Thus his development of the vaccine/serum is rapid. He produces two doses of it, but the team locked and fortified in the control tower, realize that they do not have a patient to try it on.

Luke volunteers to go and find one, not knowing that the rabies is already in the tower, since one of the members of the Aviation Security personnel has smuggled into the building a stewardess of the KLM airline with the idea to charge her safety for sexual favors, not knowing she was already infected, and thus infected him as well. As the rabies spreads rapidly amongst the remaining AS officers, Luke, who has decided the best way to certainly bring back a sample is to infect himself, runs into Dr. Matthew Lawerick (the fourth of Lieberman's 'evangelists' from Wolfenden) who has been brought to insanity following his desperate attempts to save his wife from the disease. Just as Lawerick grieves to him, Luke enters into the furious state, and, believing he is in an operating room, and operating on a patient with a tumor causing delusions, beheads him. Just as he recovers somewhat and returns to the tower, he is picked up by the remaining commander of Aviation Security, and proceeds to infect him - now there being two patients. But the situation is already too late for both, since the tower has been almost completely overrun by rabies.

The only two survivors, now also infected, are Dr. Hamilton and Dr. Deveroux, locked and isolated. Both have taken Lieberman's vaccine (Lieberman himself has been killed by the writer/chronicler, whose girlfriend was really one of the Jews hunting for Stadler, and who, before he gets locked in the tower, passes him an envelope showing the results of Stadler's work on a person who is obviously a close relative of the girlfriend) and are sitting facing each other, each in his own corner of the room. Hamilton has notified the commander of the blockade that he will be in regular telephone contact, and if he does not call, that means the vaccine/serum failed, and Heathrow is to be 'sanitized' - completely cremated by the army. Soon, they notice that the early signs of rabies infection begin to disappear - Lieberman's serum appears to work.

In the meantime, airplane carrying Soviet delegation, which left the airport in a hurry is shot down by Soviet Anti Aircraft batteries over Poland, and in Soviet Union itself, a coup takes place, when Marshal of the Soviet Union, Shurov, ousts the soft line Premier, and sets up contact with the president of the United States - he states that Soviet scientists have conclusively discovered that the virus is a laboratory mutant, that he doubts in the efficiency of Lieberman's vaccine, and in the British ability to deal with the situation in general. He proposes to US to conduct a nuclear cremation of Heathrow (and maybe entire London, since there has been, later shown, mistaken, alarm that a case appeared in the city), and apparently threatens that if US refuses to cooperate, Soviet Union will proceed with the operation on its own. After some haggling about possible nuclear war resulting from it, pressure put on the British Prime Minister by US President, and Shurov's sudden backing down, an agreement is reached - if the serum fails British will conduct the sanitation, but the force doing it will have a UN mandate (thus relieving British PM from the eventuality he would have to make and carry the costs of the decision alone).

Hamilton and Deveroux, who have admitted to feelings they shared for each other for years have sex on the roof of the tower. All of a sudden, the first shocking discovery is made - Hamiltons clock has stopped, he failed to make the final call that would announce, without a doubt, the success of the serum, and save Heathrow, because of it. He sees the helicopter of the newly formed UN Heathrow Rabies eradication force approaching the tower. His frantic attempts to signal the helicopter with his flashlight are cut short by completely naked Deveroux swinging a steel bar at him. His observations though do not show any outward signs of rabies, her face is calm and haughty instead, and her moves contain smooth elegance uncharacteristic to spasmodic movements of a rabies patient. All of a sudden, he, in himself begins to feel a sudden change - he begins to feel as if the whole of humanity is merely there to exist on his mercy, mercy no one has yet deserved, including this creature in front of him that tries to mimic his sudden, smooth and elegant moves. The serum was the final recombination of Stadler/Lieberman/Lohman virus. The crew of the helicopter sees only two titans, two übermensch, engaged in a ferocious fight on the roof, and conclude that Heathrow is dead. Behind them, the sound of jets is heard, the first wave of the eradication of Heathrow Rabies has been launched.

Since the beginning of the infection an unknown man, Gabriel, is looking out for something. Shadow that he saw in his dreams. Something is a dog from Middle-East, pioneer of the disease. He found out that dog exists from Sue Jenkins, girl that he met at the Terminal, and suddenly release that his faith is not be infected. His destiny is to save humanity. Sue's friend, along his grandfather, came to Heathrow via Alitalia airplane from Palestine-Israelian border. He brought Sharon, small black dog. Sharon's home was attacked by some other dog, dog that dr. Lieberman has infected. In all-time fight - Good against Evil, deep into sewerage system below Heathrow, both of them will be satisfied: Sharon will escape and Gabriel will survive.

The book ends with the epilogue written by the supposed author, who while visiting Gabriel at the mental hospital found out about destiny of Heathrow prisoners and his friend, Daniel Leverquin, who was at the airport and chronicled the epidemic. At the last meeting with Gabriel, considering him a Heathrow Angel, Leverquin gave him his notes. He describes the Heathrow outbreak as contained, and documents that debate is being held as to what to do with the ruins of the once great airplane hub and Gabriel latest escape from mental hospital. Writer thinks that Gabriel is needed somewhere. He concludes, though, on a bleak note, quoting the last paragraph of Camus' The Plague (1947): "but he alone knows what the crowd does not, that the plague bacillus never dies or disappears, that it can remain dormant for decades in furniture and bedding, can wait patiently in rooms, in cellars, in trunks, in handkerchiefs and paper, and that perhaps the day would come when, just to teach men a lesson and make them unhappy, the plague would awaken its rats and send them off to die in some happy city.
