= Through Distant Worlds and Times =

Book by Milutin Milanković

- Author: Milutin Milanković
- Original title: Putnik kroz vasionu i vekove
- Publication date: 1928
- Pages: 330
- ISBN: 978-86-910617-0-8
- OCLC: 813573802

Through Distant Worlds and Times or Through Distant Worlds and Times: Letters from a Wayfarer in the Universe is a romantic scientific story written by Milutin Milanković, the Serbian mathematician, astronomer, geophysicist and climatologist, in the form of letters to an anonymous young woman.

== Overview ==
Between 1925 and 1928, Milanković tried his hand at popular writing with a series of magazine articles on astronomy, astronomers, and climatology. Each month for three years he wrote a letter to an imaginary friend about visiting something in the universe or journeying to the past to visit an astronomer. The letters contained a large amount of autobiographical detail. They were published in a Serbian magazine and later collected in a book, Through Distant Worlds and Times, published in Serbian and later in German. It was the best selling book of his career.

== Synopsis ==
The book consists of 37 letters to the unnamed woman. They serve as vehicles for discussion of the history of astronomy, climatology and science. In writing the letters, Milanković remembers his early life, from birth in Dalj, through his education, to successes and failures at a professional level. The work takes inspiration from his travels through Germany, Hungary, Istanbul and Europe, and his return to his birthplace, which seems to him desolate and dilapidated in contrast.

The writer uses a personal approach to science, traveling with a friend through time and space. In the appropriate attire, they roam the ancient world. Unseen by the natives, they spy Babylonian priests, Aristotle, Eratosthenes and other great scholars and figures of antiquity and modern history.

The letters describe experiments, development of scientific instruments, ancient architecture and new cities, and an epic voyage on the seas. The history of scientific ideas is explored, including basic knowledge about the Sun, planets and their orbits. In the central part of the book, the writer discusses climate change and cyclical ice ages throughout the history and future of the Earth.

In the final letters, Milanković describes the formation of the Earth and the stages through which it passed until it became the cradle of life, then presents its future, following the dying stages of the Sun and planets. Finally, the book deals with travel to the Moon, Mars and Venus, and a pilgrimage to the universe.
