= Lazar Komarčić =

Serbian writer

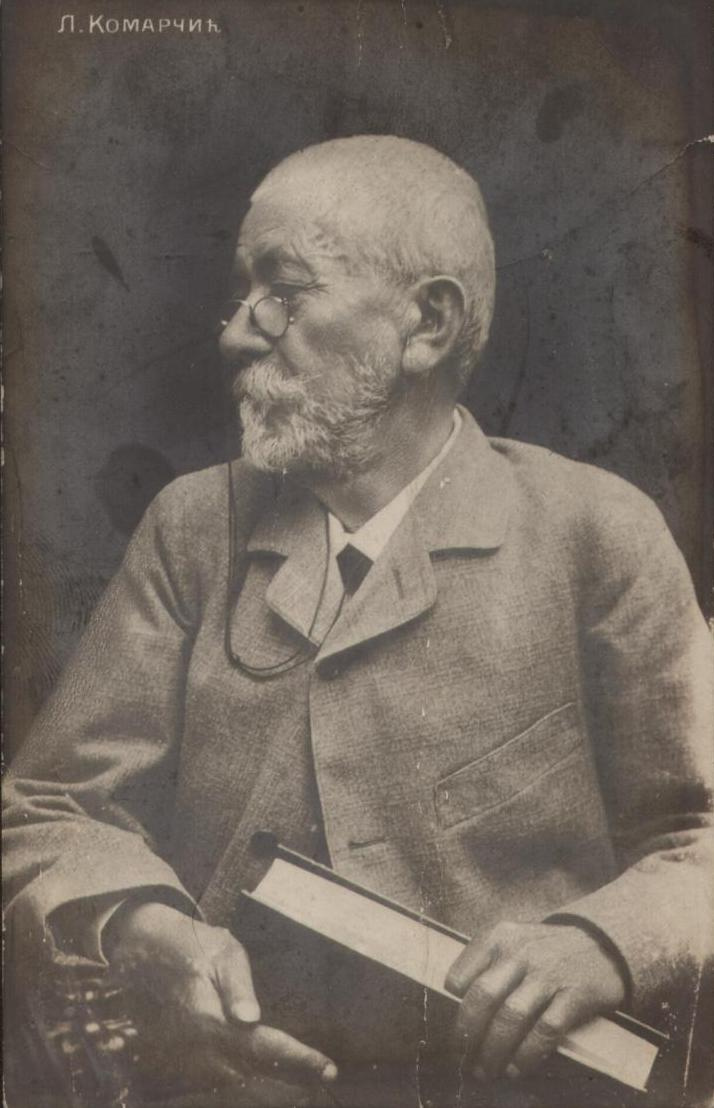
- Born: 9 January 1839; Pljevlja, Ottoman Empire
- Died: 9 January 1909 (aged 70); Belgrade, Kingdom of Serbia
- Occupations: writer, publicist

Lazar Komarčić (Serbian Cyrillic: Лазар Комарчић; 9 January 1839 – 9 January 1909) was a Serbian pioneering science fiction writer who has had a wide influence on the literary avant-garde and on surrealism. He was a novelist and playwright and was best known for his profound influence on what was to become later the literary genres of science fiction and crime novels. He was the most widely read author during the second half of the 19th and early 20th centuries, according to literary critic Jovan Skerlić. Science fiction and crime novel-writing at the beginning of the 20th century was not considered a literary pursuit, and as time passed he was forgotten until the 1970s when his works were revived. He was a contemporary of Jules Verne, Camille Flammarion, and H. G. Wells.

== Biography ==
Lazar Komarčić was born in a small village of Komartica, near the town of Pljevlja, Montenegro (then part of the Ottoman Empire), on 9 January 1839, to Milenko and Spasenija Komorica of Gornja Maoca in northeastern Bosnia. Turks killed Lazar's uncle and his father took revenge. Milenko was captured and imprisoned in Pljevlja. After escaping, he took his wife and children and moved with family to Valjevo. It was at this time that the family changed their surname to Komarčić. In Valjevo Lazar started school, but his parents soon both died. He moved to Belgrade where he studied at the Velika škola.

A defining incident of Komarčić's life was the Turkish bombardment of Belgrade in 1862 that left him without three fingers. An incident erupted at Čukur Fountain when Savo Petković, a teenager who was trying to get water at the fountain, was shot and killed by a Turkish soldier, which infuriated the citizens of Belgrade and erupted into a major conflict between Serbs and Turkish occupying forces. Belgrade was then bombarded by Turkish artillery from Kalemegdan fortress. Komarčić, at 23, held his ground together with the rest of the Serbian insurgents. A Turkish grenade exploded near him, causing him to lose three fingers on his right hand. What became known as the Čukur Fountain conflict brought the intervention of the European Powers and the Turks were soon expelled from Belgrade.

After being injured, Komarčić decided to go into teaching, and from that time on, he made writing his principal occupation.

To help out his sister, he went to Crna Bara to buy and take over her business. After three or four years as a tavern keeper, he returned to Belgrade and began his literary career by contributing articles to a local journal, Srbija. He also wrote for Zbor. Eight of his novels were published at a time when Jules Verne, Camille Flammarion, and H. G. Wells were independently working on the same genre. His most popular novel, Jedna ugašena zvezda ('One Extinguished Star'), is heavily influenced by spiritism. Komarčić, like most writers of his generation, was influenced by Rufina Noeggerath (1821–1908), the famous Belgian spiritist who was known affectionately as Bonne Maman in her day.

Before the war of 1876, Komarčić took a leading place among the most radical section of Serbian politicians as an opponent of the "opportunists" who continued the policy of Svetozar Marković. In 1875 he became an editor of Zbor, and worked with varying success to bring about the revision of the sentences passed on the so-called socialists.

He died in Belgrade on 9 January 1909.

== Works ==
Cover of Komarčić's Ancestors and Descendants.

Komarčić's position in Serbian literature is unique. There was nothing like his type of novel before his time. In 1902, he wrote the first modern Serbian science fiction novel Jedna ugašena zvezda ('One Extinguished Star'), and in collaboration with Dragutin Ilić, a drama entitled Posle milijon godina ('A Million Years From Now', 1888). The first science fiction drama was performed in Belgrade and published in the magazine Kolo in 1889. Both the novel and the drama are now considered the foundation of Serbian science fiction literature, with occult influences. Also, Komarčić wrote such popular novels as:

- Dragocena ogrlica ('An Expensive Necklace', 1880)
- Dva Amaneta (1893)
- Prosioci ('Beggars', 1905)
- Jedan razoren um: i Zapisnik jednog pokojnika (1908)
- Mučenici za slobodu
- Pretci i potomci: istorijske slike iz postanja danasnje Srbije (1905)
- Bezdušnici ('Heartless Men', novel)

== Legacy ==
He made major contributions to the science fiction genre as a writer; along with the novelists Jules Verne and H. G. Wells, Komarčić is one person in Serbia sometimes called "The Father of Science Fiction". In his honour, awards are presented to authors of the best science fiction work by the Drustvo ljubitelja fanatstike 'Lazar Komarčić', a society devoted to him. The club continues to keep his name alive today.
