= Dragutin Ilić =

Serbian writer (1858–1926)

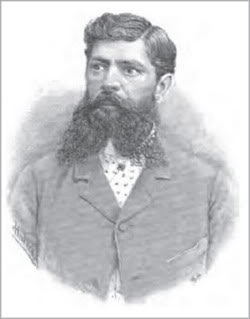
Dragutin Ilić

Dragutin Ilić (2 February or 14 February 1858 in Belgrade – 1 May 1926 in Belgrade) was a Serbian playwright, poet, novelist, journalist and politician. Along with Matija Ban and Djordje Maletić, Ilić dominated the Serbian stage during the late 19th century.

As far back as the end of the 18th century, science fiction elements can be found in Serbian literature, but its modern period foundation is considered to commence with "Posle milijon godina" (After Million of Years), written by Dragutin Ilić in 1889, which is also considered the first science fiction theatrical play in modern Serbian literature. Lazar Komarčić's novel "Jedna ugašena zvezda" (An Extinguished Star) followed in 1902.

== Biography ==
Dragutin Ilić is the son of Jovan Ilić, and brother of the poet Vojislav Ilić, his younger sibling. Dragutin's best works, however, were his plays and novels. Educated to be a lawyer, but was drawn towards journalism and literary pursuits, particularly the theatre. He worked as an editor and civil servant.

Though Dragutin wrote his first play in the mid-1870s, it was not till a few years after the Serbian-Ottoman War (1876-78) that he decided to offer a play to the National Theatre in Belgrade. The first play he gave to the theatre was a drama called Vukašin in 1881. The play was produced the following year with a resounding success. Dragutin followed up with another 12 plays up until 1906, all successfully performed with rave reviews. The tradition of patriotic theatre with music extended through the century, culminating in one aspect of the work of Slovene-born composer Davorin Jenko at the National Theatre in Belgrade. These were sung plays, but with Vračara (Sorceress) of 1882 Jenko composed what is often regarded as the first Serbian operetta and with his music for Dragutin Ilić's Pribislav i Bozana (1894) he came close to a full-blown opera. Also, in Pribislav i Bozana by Dragutin we find stylizations of folk motives appropriate to the very popular kind of Serbian singspiel such as Djido (The Village Playboy) by Janko Veselinvić. Dragutin is said to have approached the singspiel style of the German composer Carl Maria von Weber.

His plays are intensely Serbian and knowledge of the times in which they are set is essential for a proper understanding of them. It was critic Jovan Skerlić's lack of understanding the man himself, rather than the plays and novels he wrote, which was responsible for omitting Dragutin Ilić's name from among the premier writers and poets in his Istorija nove srpske književnosti (History of Modern Serbian Literature). Unlike his younger brother Vojislav, Dragutin did not consider himself dedicated to poetry only; and most of his early work was written for some immediate, nonliterary purpose. That Dragutin was dedicated to literature, at least to literature in its broadest sense, is borne out of his opus and the fact that he was striving for the beauty of expression can be seen in his style.

Today, however, his name stands among the noteworthy playwrights of that period such as Milorad Popović Šapčanin, Miloš Cvetić, Branislav Nušić, Laza Kostić, Đura Jakšić, and Janko Veselinović, people who constituted most of the intellectual and literary core of the National Theatre in Belgrade of the late nineteenth century.

At that time, Belgrade was seething with social and political unrest, and Dragutin Ilić was drawn into the activities of various political parties and organizations. It is necessary to keep this picture of Belgrade that shaped Dragutin Ilić and made him the dramatist and novelist that he came to be; it alone explains his strength and his weakness and gives a clue to the many contradictions and enigmas that surround him. For political reasons Dragutin left Belgrade for Bucharest in 1888, only to return to his hometown intermittently for the next 38 years. In 1889 he settled in Zagreb, working as a journalist for "Srbobran", before returning to Serbia where he unsuccessfully sought employment. He left Belgrade for Sremski Karlovci, where he wrote articles for newspapers and periodicals such as Brankovo kolo, Bosanska vila, Zora, Nada, Zastava and Letopis Matice srpske. In 1898 he moved to Novi Sad to become the editor of "Zastava" and wrote a poem critical of Miloš Obrenović. In 1901 he returned to Bucharest where he started a bilingual (Russian and French) newspaper -- Pravoslavni Istok—aimed at the Russian reading public with the purpose to have Russia's foreign policy take a kinder and closer look at the Balkans. When his paper got banned, Dragutin returned to Serbia to take up his literary work in the theatre where he left off years before. At the time Belgrade was preparing for the First Balkan War (to rid itself of the Turkish occupier altogether), intellectuals were speaking of uniting all Southern Slavs into one nation. The first to win his allegiance was the Creation of Yugoslavia idea, which he joined at the beginning of World War I. Though primarily a language movement in its infancy, it had gradually achieved a political status. Dragutin was so enthusiastic for the Yugoslav cause that he left for Odessa to enlist volunteers for a new country called Yugoslavia.

Ilić died in Belgrade in 1926, mostly forgotten by the public. In modern Serbia, Dragutin Ilić's work is more respected as part of the history of theatre and drama than his literary achievements.

== Works ==
- Vukašin (1882), drama
- Jakvinta (1883), drama
- Pesme (1884), poems
- Pribislav i Božana (1887), drama
- Otmica (1887), one-act drama
- Poslednji borac (1889), epic poem
- Posle milijon godina (1888), drama
- Ženidba Miloša Obilića (1898), drama
- Za veru i slobodu (1890), drama
- Tri deputacije (1906), novel
- Novele (1892)
- Lihvarka (1895), comedy
- Poslednji prorok (1896), biography of the Prophet Mohamed
- Saul (play 1900, published 1906), drama
- Hadži Đera (1904), novel
- Ženik slobode (1904), drama
- Viđenje Karađorđevo (1904), drama
- Uspomene iz Rumunije (1904, 1905), memoirs
- Neznani gost (1907), drama
- Hadži Diša (1908), roman
- Zaječarska buna (1909), memoirs
- Osvećeno Kosovo (1913), collected poems
- Pesma jednog života (1916), novel
- Sekund večnosti, istočnjački roman] (1921)
- Smrt kralja Vladimira (1925), epic poem
