= Borislav Pekić =

Serbian writer and activist

- Борислав Пекић
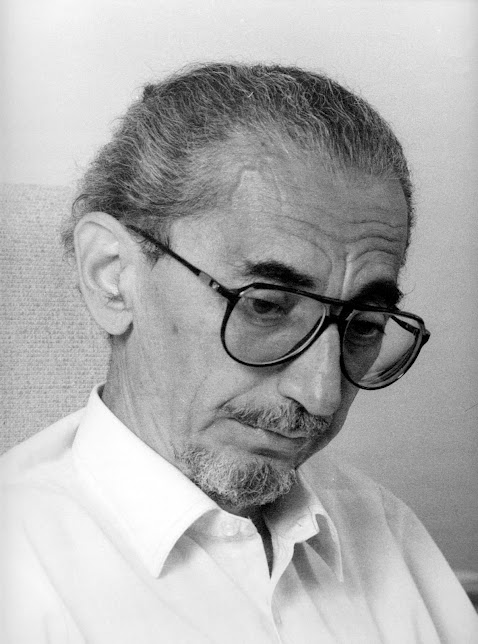
- Pekić in 1987
- Born: 4 February 1930; Podgorica, Kingdom of Yugoslavia (modern-day Montenegro)
- Died: 2 July 1992 (aged 62); London, England
- Resting place: New Cemetery, Belgrade
- Occupations: Novelist; political activist
- Years active: 1959—1992
- Political party: DS (1990–1992)

Borislav Pekić (Serbian Cyrillic: Борислав Пекић, pronounced [bǒrislaʋ pěkitɕ]; 4 February 1930 – 2 July 1992) was a Serbian writer and political activist.

He was born to a prominent family in Montenegro, at that time part of the Kingdom of Yugoslavia. From 1945 until his emigration to London in 1971, he lived in Belgrade. He was also one of the founding members of the Democratic Party in Serbia. He is considered one of the most important Serbian literary figures of the 20th century.

== Life and works ==
=== Early life and novels ===
Borislav Pekić spent his childhood in different cities of Serbia, Montenegro and Croatia. He graduated from high school in 1948 in Belgrade and shortly afterward was arrested with the accusation of belonging to the secret association "Yugoslav Democratic Youth" and sentenced to fifteen years of prison. During the time in prison, he conceived many of the ideas later developed in his major novels. He was released after five years and in 1953 began studying experimental psychology at the University of Belgrade Faculty of Philosophy, although he never earned a degree.

In 1958, he married Ljiljana Glišić (1932–2026), the niece of Milan Stojadinović, Prime Minister of Yugoslavia (1935–1939) and a year later their daughter Aleksandra was born. 1958 marked also the year when Pekić wrote his first of over twenty original film scripts for the major film studios in Yugoslavia, among which Dan četrnaesti ("The Fourteenth Day") represented Yugoslavia at the 1961 Cannes Film Festival.

For years, Pekić had been working on several novels and when the first of them, Vreme čuda (1965), came out, it caught the attention of a wide reading audience as well as the critics. In 1976 it was published in English by Brace Harcourt in New York as The Time of Miracles. It was also translated into French in 1986, Polish in 1986, Romanian in 1987, Italian in 2004, and Greek in 2007. Pekić's first novel clearly announced two of the most important characteristics of his work: sharp anti-dogmatism and constant skepticism regarding any possible 'progress' mankind has achieved over the course of history.

During the 1968–1969 period, Pekić was one of the editors of Književne novine literary magazine. In 1970 his second novel, Hodočašće Arsenija Njegovana (The Pilgrimage of Arsenije Njegovan) was published, in which an echo of the students protests of 1968 in Yugoslavia can be found. Despite his ideological distance from the mainstream opposition movements, the new political climate further complicated his relationship with the authorities, who refused him a passport for some time. The novel, nevertheless, won the NIN award for the best Yugoslav novel of the year. An English translation The Houses of Belgrade appeared in 1978 and it was later published in Polish, Czech and Romanian.

=== Exile and further work ===
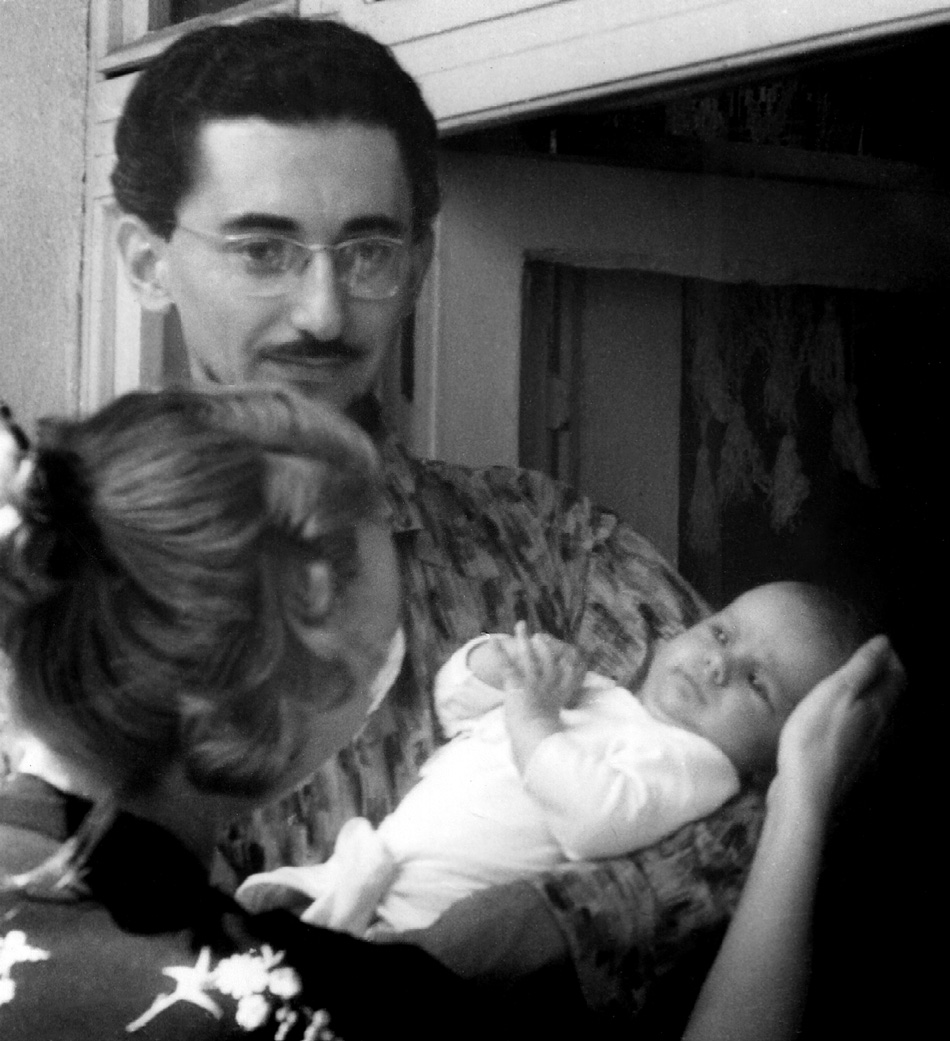
Pekić with his wife Ljiljana holding their daughter in 1959.

Following Pekić's emigration to London in 1971, the Yugoslav authorities still considered him persona non grata and for several years they prevented his books from being published in Yugoslavia. Finally, in 1975, Uspenje i sunovrat Ikara Gubelkijana ("The Rise and Fall of Icarus Gubelkian") appeared. It was later translated into Polish in 1980, Hungarian in 1982, Czech in 1985, and French in 1992.

In 1977, he sent the manuscript of Kako upokojiti Vampira ("How to Quiet a Vampire") to an anonymous literary competition. The Association of Yugoslav Publishers recognized it as the best novel of the year and promptly published it. Kako upokojiti Vampira was subsequently translated into Czech in 1980, Polish in 1985, and Italian in 1992, with an English translation finally appearing in 2005. Based in part on Pekić's own prison experiences, this novel offers an insight into the methods, logic and psychology of a modern totalitarian regime.

Odbrana i poslednji dani ("The Defense and the Last Days", 1977) was published in Polish and Hungarian in 1982, Czech in 1983, French in 1989 and Swedish in 2003. These three novels essentially dealt with contrasting types of collaboration in Yugoslavia at different levels during World War II.

In 1978, after more than two decades of preparation, investigation and study, the first volume of Zlatno runo ("The Golden Fleece", 1978–1986) was published, fully establishing Pekić as one of the most important Serbian authors. In 1987 he received Montenegrin Njegoš award for this work, marking it as one of the most important contemporary prose writings in Yugoslavia. The Golden Fleece prompted comparison by international critics to James Joyce’s Ulysses and its narrative patterns of classical myths, to Thomas Mann's Buddenbrooks and its long family history and evolution of pre-war society, and to Aldous Huxley's Point Counter Point and its inner tensions created through a maze of conflicting perspectives; yet The Golden Fleece was also hailed as unique. One of the novel’s obvious distinctions is its enormous scope and thematic complexity. The Golden Fleece describes the wanderings of generations of the Njegovans, and through them explores the history of the Balkans. The first, second and third volumes were published in French in 2002, 2003 and 2004. The fourth volume was published in 2008.

During the 1980s, Pekić created something entirely new. He had been collecting material for a book about the lost island of Atlantis, with the intention to give “a new, although poetical, explanation of the roots, development, and the end of our civilization”. Despite the classical sources that inspired his anthropological interests, Pekić decided to project his new vision into the future and thus avoid the restrictions of the ‘historical models’, which he had inevitably had to confront in his earlier remakes of ancient myths. The result was three novels: Besnilo ("Rabies", 1983), Atlantida ("Atlantis", 1988) and 1999 (1984). The novel Rabies together with The Golden Fleece and The Years the Locusts Have Devoured, were selected by readers as the best novels in the years from 1982 to 1991. All of them were reprinted numerous times in Serbia. Rabies was published in Spanish in 1988, and Hungarian in 1994, and Atlantis in Czech in 1989. For Atlantis Pekić won the ‘Croatian Goran’ award in 1988. At the end of 1984 Pekić's twelve volume Selected Works appeared, winning him an award from the Union of Serbian Writers.

Godine koje su pojeli skakavci ("The Years Devoured by Locusts", in three volumes) was published between 1987 and 1990. Two parts of the 1st volume were translated into English and published in literary magazines. These are Pekić's memoirs with an account of the post-war days and the life and persecutions of the bourgeoisie under the communist rule. The account is not purely autobiographical in the classical sense, since Pekić also deals with life in general in Yugoslavia after the Second World War. He depicts prison life as a unique civilization and the civilization of ‘freedom’ as a special kind of prison. This trilogy was selected as the best memoir and received the ‘Miloš Crnjanski’ award.

The gothic stories Novi Jerusalim ("The New Jerusalem") were published in 1989, and Pekić accepted the Majska Rukovanja award in Montenegro in 1990 for his literary and cultural achievements. Two stories from the book were published in French, English and Ukrainian in different anthologies. 'Covek koji je jeo smrt' ("The man who ate death") from Novi Jerusalim ("The New Jerusalem") was translated into French in 2005, and won the French "Book Of The Day" award the same year.

=== Film, theater and radio ===
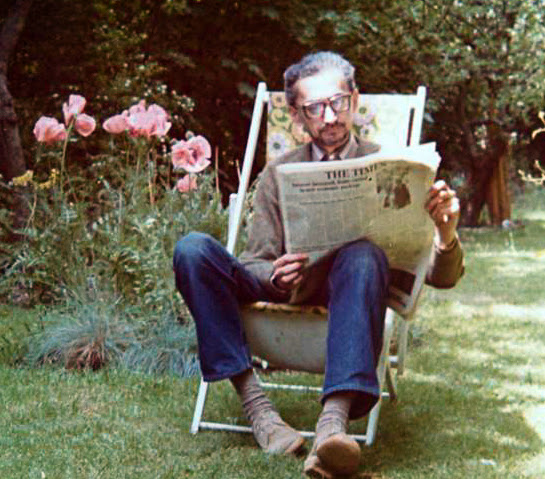
A photo of Pekić in his garden, London, 1978

Pekić distinguished himself in the 1970s as one of the best Serbian contemporary dramatists. He regularly wrote radio-plays for Westdeutscher Rundfunk, Cologne, as well as Süddeutscher Rundfunk, Stuttgart. Of the 27 plays written and performed in Serbia, 17 had their first production in Germany. Many of them were transformed into theatre and/or TV plays, and received a number of awards. Sixteen were published in his Odabrana dela (Selected works, 1984) and his play Generali ili srodstvo po oruzju (The Generals or Kinship-In-Arms, 1969) can be found in any anthology of Serbian contemporary drama. Pekić's theatre plays were widely acclaimed and popular, the most famous being Korešpondencija (Correspondence 1979), which was based on the fourth volume of the Golden Fleece and ran for 280 performances and 23 years at the Atelje 212 Theatre in Belgrade.

Throughout his career, Pekić worked on numerous films, writing more than twenty original screenplays and adapting some of his novels to the screen. The Time of Miracles was selected to represent Yugoslavia at the Cannes Film Festival in 1991, where it won an award, and later at film festivals in Glasgow and Montreal. The Devils Heaven (The Summer of White Roses) won an award at the film festival in Tokyo in 1989 and was selected the same year to represent Yugoslavia at film festivals in Montpellier (France), Pula (Croatia), San Sebastián (Spain), and Los Angeles and San Francisco (USA).

As a part-time commentator at the BBC World Service in London, (1986–1991) Pekić read his ‘Letters from London’ every week; these were subsequently printed in Yugoslavia as Pisma iz tuđine, Nova pisma iz tuđine, and Poslednja pisma iz tuđine (Letters From Abroad, 1, 2 &3, 1987–1991). Each book was made up of 50 letters with witty and inventive observations about England and the English people. The letters were also broadcast for listeners in Serbia, for whom Pekić particularly enjoyed making numerous humorous comparisons between the English and his fatherland's governments, country and people. For these books he received the Jaša Ignjatović award (Hungary) in 1991. Pekić also ran a series on the same program at the BBC about the history of Great Britain, which was published posthumously - Sentimentalna povest Britanskog carstva (A Sentimental History Of The British Empire, 1992), for which he received the Yearly ‘Bigz’ award. It was published several times enjoying a huge success.

=== End of life and posthumous texts ===
In 1989, he became one of the founding members of The Democratic Party in Serbia and in 1990 he became its vice president and one of the editors of the party's newspaper "Demokratija" ("Democracy"). Pekić was a member of the P. E. N. Association in London and Belgrade, and became Vice President of the Serbian P. E. N. Association between 1990 and 1992. He was elected to The Serbian Academy of Sciences and Arts in 1985, and was made a member of the Advisory Committee to The Royal Crown in 1992.

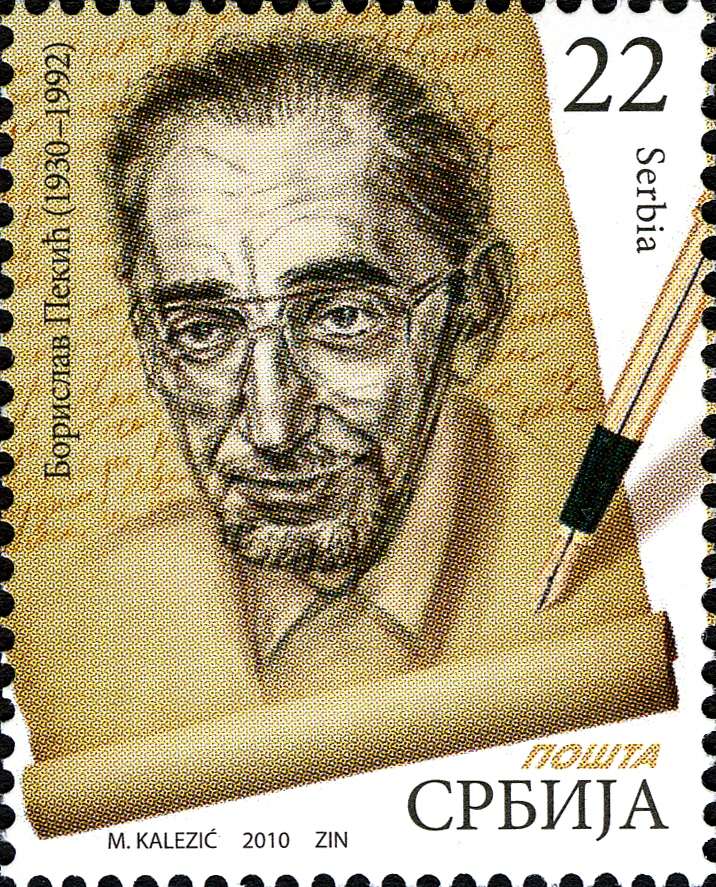
Postal stamp with portrait of Borislav Pekić. The stamp was part of the series "Great people of Serbian literature" (Великани српске књижевности) which Pošta Srbije has published in 2010.

Active both as an author and a public figure until his last day, Pekić died of lung cancer at his home in London on 2 July 1992. He was laid to rest at the famous 'Alley of Distinguished Citizens' ('Aleja zaslužnih građana') in Belgrade together with other distinguished figures from the social, political and cultural echelons of society. Posthumously, in 1992, Crown Prince Alexander of Yugoslavia awarded Pekić the Order of the White Eagle, being the highest honour bestowed by Yugoslavian Royal Family.

A large body of his work was, and continues to be, published posthumously: Vreme reči ("The Time of Words"), 1993; Odmor od istorije ("A Break from History"), 1993; Graditelji ("The Builders"), 1994; Rađanje Atlantide ("The Birth of Atlantis"), 1996; Skinuto sa trake ("Transferred from Tapes"), 1996; U traganju za Zlatnim runom ("In Search of the Golden Fleece"), 1997; Izabrana pisma iz tuđine ("Selected Letters from Abroad"), 2000; Političke sveske ("Political Notebooks"), 2001; Filosofske sveske ("Philosophical Notebooks"), 2001; Korespondencija kao život, 1&2 ("Correspondence as a Life"), 2002–2003; Sabrana pisma iz tuđine ("Collection of letters from abroad"), 2004, Roboti i sablasti ("Robots and Wraiths", collection of unpublished plays), 2006, Izabrane drame ("Selected plays"), 2007, Izabrani eseji ("Selected essays"), 2007, Moral i demokratija ("Moral and democracy", a collection of interviews and essays), 2008, Marginalije i moralije (collected thoughts from published and unpublished work), 2008.

On 1 and 2 July 2000, the Serbian Academy of Sciences and Arts in Belgrade held a symposium with the theme: ‘Literary work of Borislav Pekić on the occasion of the 70th anniversary of his birth’. The essays from that symposium were published in 2003. In 2006, his wife Ljiljana, credited with the abovementioned posthumously published work, started the Borislav Pekic blog where one can find published as well as yet unpublished works of Pekic. Pekić has left a vast corpus of high literary quality characterized by following traits: narrative structures of growing complexity that, in the case of The Golden Fleece cross the fuzzy bounds of the post-modern novel and can be best described by the author's sub-title "Phantasmagoria" (this mammoth work is more than 3,500 pages long); the presence of autobiographical thread one can detect in all major Pekić's works, but especially in his vivid and unsentimental memoirs on his years as a political prisoner and essayist books on life in Britain; obsession with the theme of personal freedom crushed by the impersonal mechanism of the totalitarian power.

== Views ==
Pekić never took British citizenship during his life in exile in the United Kingdom. He considered himself a Serb and a Serbian writer and wanted to stay that way for the rest of his life, with which his wife and daughter showed solidarity.

In correspondence with friends, he stated that "no one wants him in Serbia", as well as that Serbs blamed him for not being a Serb enough in public appearances and that Montenegrins blamed him for "not standing up for their fictional nation".

== Bibliography ==
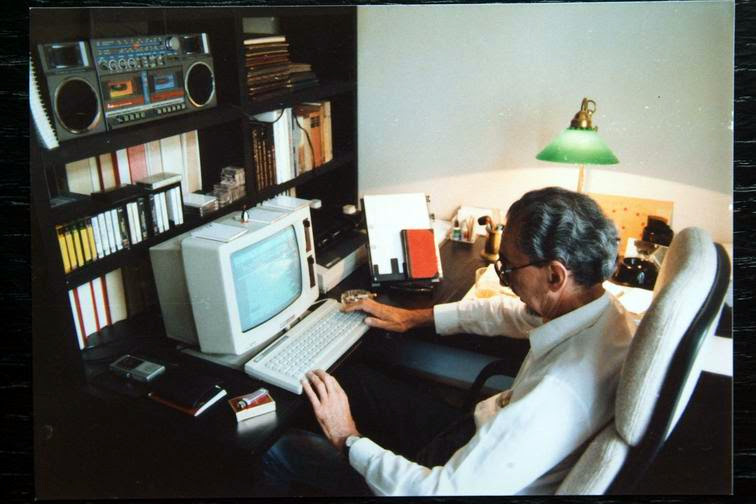
Pekić in his Belgrade home office in 1987

=== Works available in English translation ===
In chronological order of translation:

- The Time of Miracles, translated by Lovett F. Edwards, New York: Harcourt Brace Jovanovich, 1976, ISBN 0-15-190464-2.
- The Houses of Belgrade, translated by Bernard Johnson, New York: Harcourt Brace Jovanovich, 1978, ISBN 0-15-142183-8.
- The Generals or Kinship-in-Arms, play, translated by Vidosava Janković, "Scena" 13 (1990), pp. 143–53.
- Megalo Mastoras and His Work 1347 A.D., translated by Stephen M. Dickey and Doc Roc in The Prince of Fire: An Anthology of Contemporary Serbian Short Stories, edited by Radmila J. Gorup and Nadežda Obradović, Pittsburgh (PA): University of Pittsburgh Press, 1998.
- How to Quiet a Vampire, translated by Stephen M. Dickey and Bogdan Rakić, Evanston (IL): Northwestern University Press, 2005, ISBN 0-8101-1720-7 and ISBN 0-8101-1719-3 (cloth text).
- The Apology and the Last Days, translated by Bojan Mišić, Evanston (IL): Northwestern University Press, 2012, ISBN 978-0810128231

=== Bibliography in Serbian ===
In square brackets the title in Cyrillic and its literal translation.

- Vreme čuda [Време чуда, "The Time of Miracles"], novel, Belgrade: Prosveta, 1965. Translated in English with the title The Time of Miracles.
- Hodočašće Arsenija Njegovana [Ходочашће Арсенија Његована, "The Pilgrimage of Arsenij Njegovan"], novel, Belgrade: Prosveta, 1970. Translated as The Houses of Belgrade.
- Uspenje i sunovrat Ikara Gubelkijana [Успење и суноврат Икара Губелкијана, "Rise and fall of Icarus Gubelkijan"], novel, Belgrade: Slovo Ljubve, 1975.
- Kako upokojiti vampira, [Како упокојити вампира, "How to Quiet a Vampire"], Belgrade: BIGZ, Rad, Narodna knjiga, 1977. Translated as How to Quiet a Vampire.
- Odbrana i poslednji dani, [Одбрана и последњи дани, "The Defense and the Last Days"], novel, Belgrade: Slovo Ljubve, 1977. Translated as The Apology and the Last Days.
- Zlatno runo [Златно руно, "The Golden Fleece"], novel in 7 volumes, Belgrade: Prosveta, 1978 (vol. I & II), 1980 (vol. III & IV), 1981 (vol. V), 1986 (vol. VI & VII).
- Besnilo [Беснило, "Rabies"], novel, Zagreb: Sveučilišna naklada Liber, 1983.
- 1999, novel, Ljublijana, Zagreb: Cankarjeva založba and Belgrade: Književni glasnik, NIN, 1984.
- Godine koje su pojeli skakavci ["The Years the Locusts have Devoured"], memories, Belgrade: BIGZ, 1987 (Vol. 1), 1989 (Vol.2), 1990 (Vol. 3).
- Pisma iz tuđine ["Letters from abroad"], Zagreb: Znanje, 1987.
- Novi Jerusalim [Нови Јерусалим, "The New Jerusalem"], short stories, London: Gotska hronika and Belgrade: Nolit, 1988.
- Atlantida [Атлантида, "Atlantis"], novel, 2 Vol., Zagreb: Znanje, 1988.
- Nova pisma iz tuđine ["New Letters from Abroad"], Zagreb: Mladost, 1989.
- Poslednja pisma iz tuđine ["Last Letters from Abroad"], Belgrade: Dereta, 1991.
- Sentimentalna povest britanskog carstva [Сентиментална повест британског царства, "Sentimental History of the British Empire"], essay, Belgrade: BIGZ, 1992.
- Vreme reči ["The Time of Words"], edited by Božo Koprivica, Belgrade: BIGZ; Srpska književna zadruga, 1993.
- Odmor od istorije ["A Pause in History"], edited by Radoslav Bratić, Belgrade: BIGZ, 1993.
- Graditelji ["The Builders"], Belgrade: BIGZ, 1995.
- Rađanje Atlantide ["The Birth of Atlantis"], edited by Ljiljana Pekić, Belgrade: BIGZ, 1996.
- Skinuto sa trake ["Transferred from Tape"], edited by Predrag Palavestra, Belgrade: Narodna knjiga, 1996.
- U traganju za Zlatnim runom ["In Search of the Golden Fleece"], edited by Ljiljana Pekić, Belgrade: BIGZ, 1997.
- Političke sveske ["Political Notes"], edited by Ljiljana Pekić, Novi Sad: Solaris and Stylos, 2001.
- Filosofske sveske ["Philosophical Notes"], edited by Ljiljana Pekić, Novi Sad: Stylos, 2001.
- Korespondencija kao život ["Correspondence as a Life"], letters, edited by Ljiljana Pekić, Novi Sad: Solaris, 2002 (vol. I), 2003 (vol. II).
- Roboti i sablasti ["Robots and Wraiths], edited by Ljiljana Pekić, Novi Sad: Solaris, 2006.
- Demokratija i nacija ["Democracy and the Nation"], 2006.
- Izabrani eseji ["Selected Essays"], edited by Ljiljana Pekić, Novi Sad; Solaris, 2007.
- Izabrane drame ["Selected Plays"], edited by Ljiljana Pekić, Novi Sad: Solaris, 2007.
- Moral i demokratija ["Moral and Democracy"], 2008.
- Marginalije i moralije ["Marginals and Morals]"], edited by Ljiljana Pekić, Novi Sad: Solaris, 2008.
