= List of people from Belgrade =

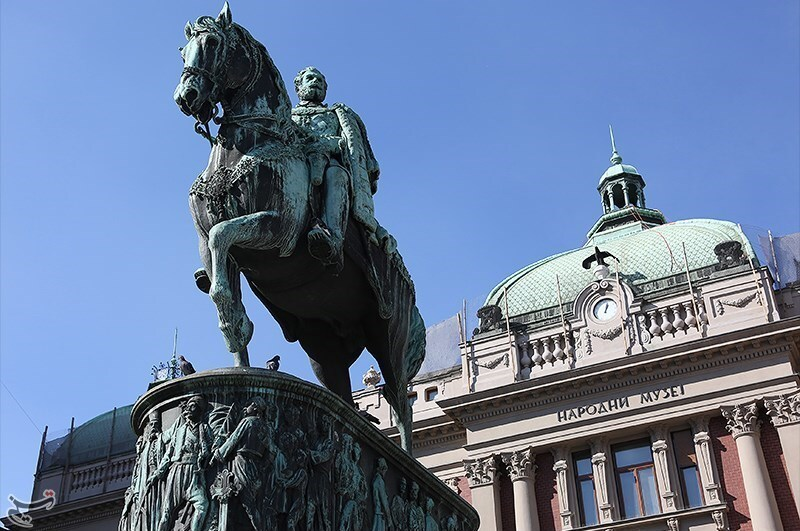
Statue of Prince Mihailo Obrenović in Belgrade

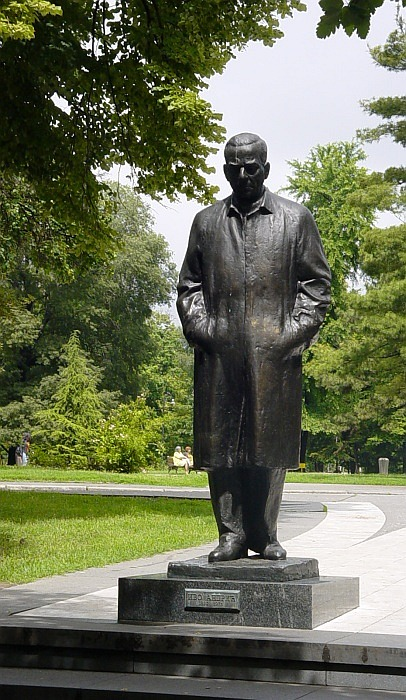
Statue of Ivo Andrić in Belgrade

This is a list of famous or notable citizens of Belgrade (included in the list are natives as well as permanent and/or temporary residents).

== Arts ==
=== Architecture ===
- Dragiša Brašovan (1887–1965), modernist architect, one of the leading architects of the early 20th century in Yugoslavia, born in Vršac and lived in Belgrade
- Dragutin Djordjević (1866-1933), academic style architect and university professor, born in Loznica and lived in Belgrade
- Petar Bajalović (1876-1947), modernism architect, born in Šabac and lived in Belgrade
- Zoran Bojović (1936–2018), Serbian and Yugoslav architect and engineer

=== Literature and poetry ===
- Bruce Sterling, science fiction author, one of the founders of the cyberpunk movement
- Charles Simić, Serbian-American poet
- Srđan Ćuković (born 1952), poet and composer
- Gordana Ćulibrk (born 1952), writer
- Meša Selimović, author
- Milorad Pavić, poet, prose writer, translator, and literary historian
- Nune Popović, Serbian author, activist

=== Painting ===
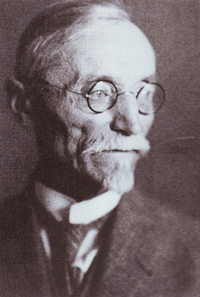
Uroš Predić (1857–1953)

- Dragomir Glišić (1872–1957), realism and impressionism painter and war photographer, born in Valjevo and lived in Belgrade
- Nadežda Petrović (1873–1915), fauvism painter, born in Čačak and lived in Belgrade
- Uroš Predić (1857–1953), realism painter, born in Orlovat and lived in Belgrade

=== Comics ===
- Aleksa Gajić (born in 1974), comics artist and film director, creator of Technotise and the main author of the animated feature film Technotise: Edit & I
- Enki Bilal, comic book creator, comics artist and film director

=== Sculpture ===
- Lilly Otašević, Canadian sculptor and designer

=== Multiple art disciplines ===
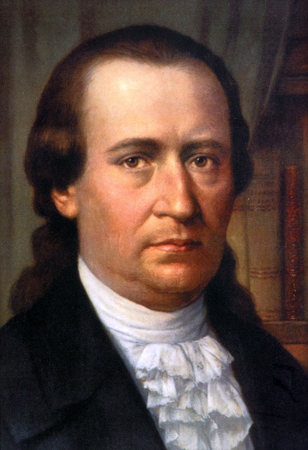
Dositej Obradović (1739–1811)

- Dositej Obradović (1739–1811; born as Dimitrije Obradović), Serbian writer, biographer, diarist, philosopher, pedagogue, educational reformer, linguist, polyglot and the first minister of education of Serbia, born in Ciacova, Romania and lived in Belgrade
- Jovan Hristić (1933-2002), Serbian poet, playwright, essayist, literary and theater critic, translator

== Entertainment ==
=== Fashion and modeling ===
- Bojana Sentaler, Canadian fashion designer
- Ivana Sert, Serbian-Turkish TV personality, model, and fashion designer
- Roksanda Ilinčić, London-based fashion designer

=== Film, theater, and television ===
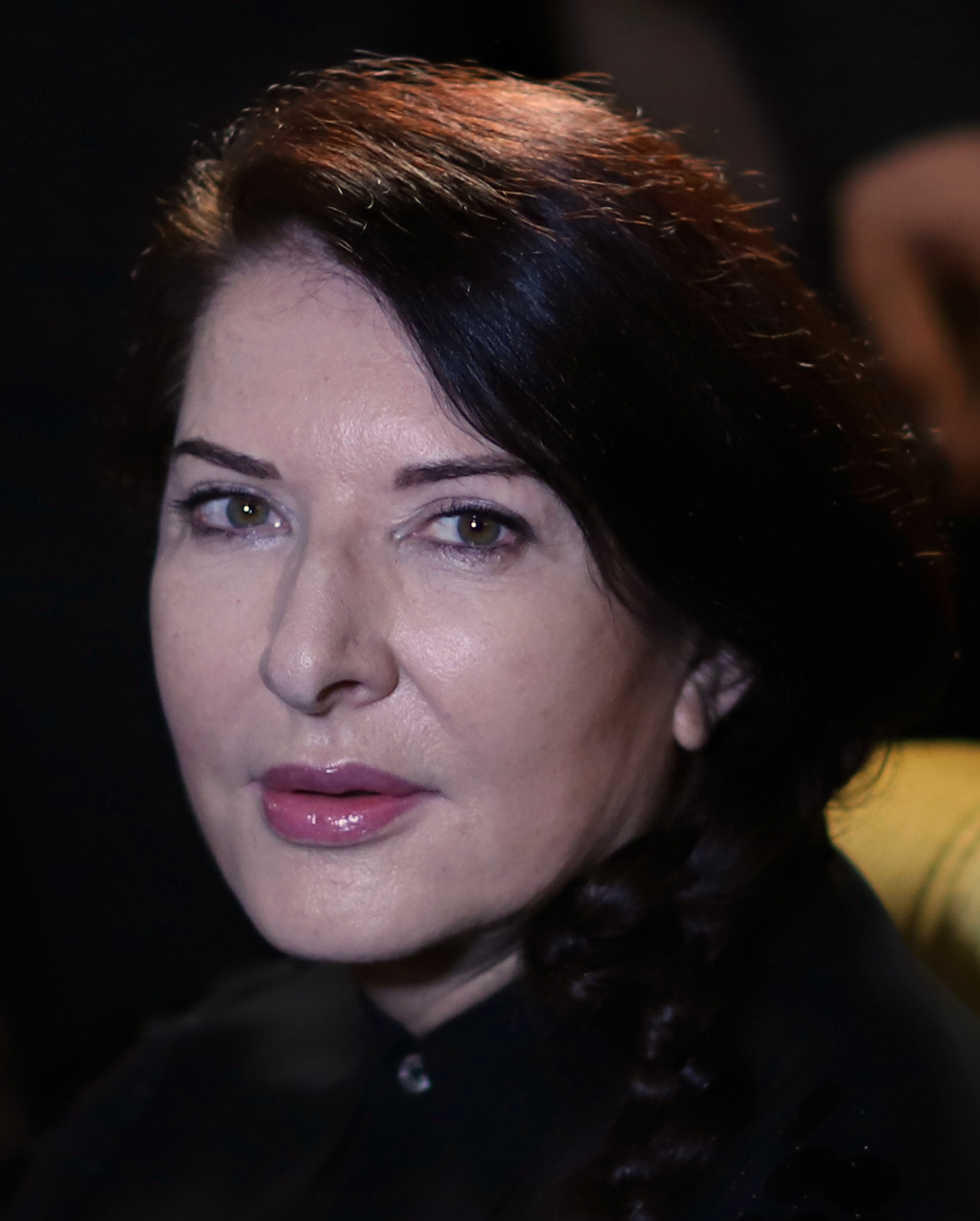
Marina Abramović

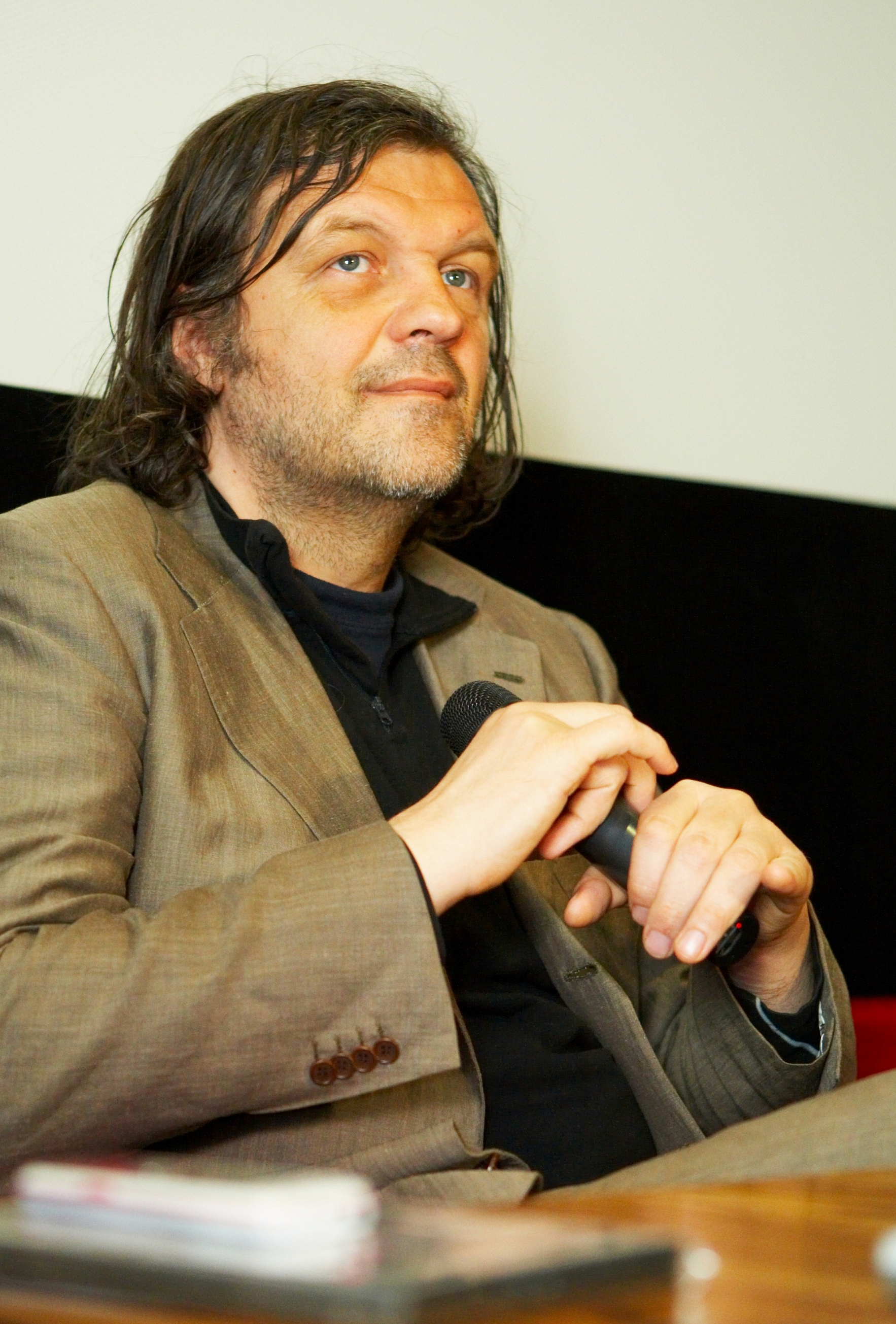
Emir Kusturica

- Dušan Makavejev, Yugoslavian film director, famous for his groundbreaking films of Yugoslav cinema in the late 1960s and early 1970s
- Emir Kusturica, filmmaker, double winner of the Palme d'Or at the Cannes Film Festival
- Jelena Adžić, Canadian media personality, CBC arts reporter
- Marina Abramović, performance artist
- Milan Radonjić, TV personality, comedian
- Mladen Kalpić, journalist, lecturer, filmmaker, and artist
- Nikola Đuričko (born 1974), Serbian actor

=== Internet ===
- Bogdan Ilić (born 1996; pseudonym Baka Prase), Serbian YouTuber, internet personality, rapper, gamer, actor and entertainer, born in Vranje and lived in Belgrade
- Kristina Đukić (2000–2021; pseudonym Kika), Serbian YouTuber and livestreamer

=== Music ===
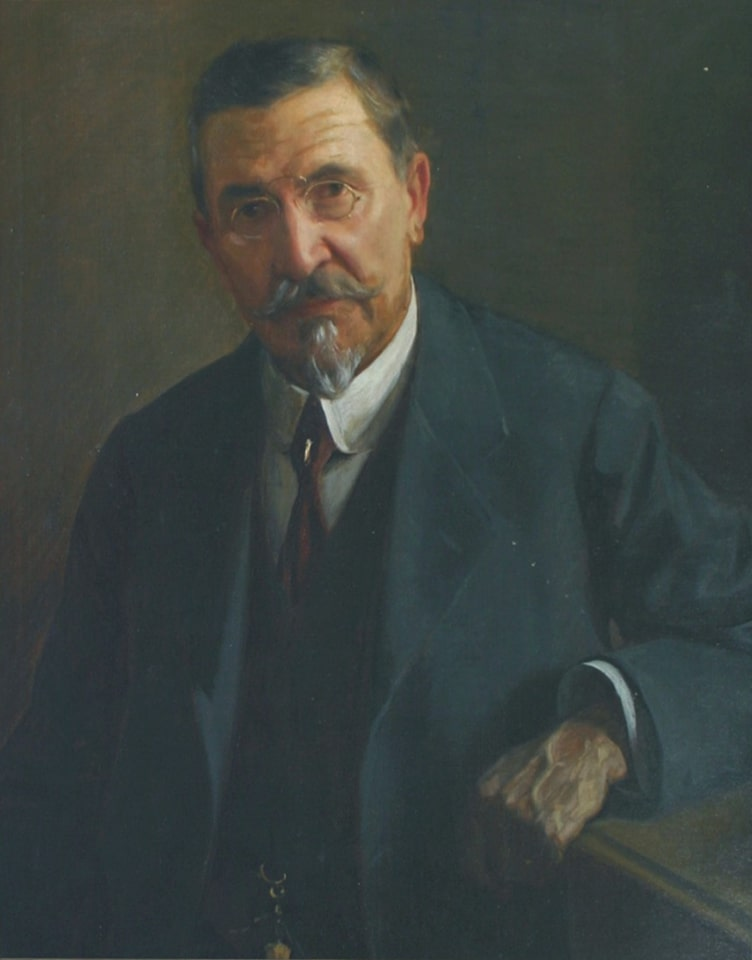
Stevan Mokranjac (1856–1914)

- Ana Đurić (born 1978; stage name Konstrakta), singer, Serbian representative in the Eurovision Song Contest 2022
- Ana Popović (born 1976), blues guitarist
- Ana Sokolović (born 1968), Canadian award winning music composer
- Bojana Stamenov (born 1986), singer, Serbian representative in the Eurovision Song Contest 2015
- Bojan Zulfikarpašić (born 1968), jazz pianist and composer
- Dania Ben Sassi (born 1998), Libyan Amazigh singer, born in Belgrade
- David Bižić (born 1975), opera singer
- Dejan Miladinović (1948–2017), opera director (Serbia, US, Yugoslavia), professor of Southern Methodist University, Dallas, Texas, and University of Southern California, Los Angeles, California
- Djordje Stijepovic, Serbian-American double bass player and composer
- Dušan Bogdanović (born 1955), guitarist and composer
- Goran Bregović (born 1950), Serbian and Yugoslav musician and singer-songwriter, born in Sarajevo, Bosnia and Herzegovina and lives in Belgrade
- Goran Simić (1953–2008), opera singer, bass
- Ivana Jenkins (born 1983; born Ivana Vujić, stage name Ivy Jenkins), Canadian bass player and designer
- Jelena Karleuša (born 1978), singer, one of the biggest stars in Southeast Europe
- Jelena Mihailović (born 1987; stage name Jela Cello), cellist, born in Valjevo and lives in Belgrade
- Katarina Pejak, blues singer and pianist
- Maja Bogdanović (born 1982), cellist
- Marija Šerifović (born 1984), singer, Serbian representative and winner of the Eurovision Song Contest 2007, born in Kragujevac and lives in Belgrade
- Milenko Stefanović (1930–2022), classical and jazz clarinetist
- Predrag Gosta (born 1972), conductor and harpsichordist
- Sara Jovanović (born 1993; pseudonym Sara Jo), Serbian singer, songwriter, dancer, model and actress, born in Rome, Italy and lives in Belgrade
- Stevan Stojanović Mokranjac (1856–1914), Serbian composer and music educator, led the Belgrade choir in the late 19th century
- Zdravko Čolić (born in 1951), Serbian and Yugoslav singer, born in Sarajevo, Bosnia and Herzegovina and lives in Belgrade

== Sciences ==
- Archibald Reiss, scientist
- Igor Delijanić, meteorologist
- Milutin Milanković, mathematician
- Vesna Milosevic-Zdjelar, Canadian astrophysicist, science educator
- Živojin Bumbaširević (1920–2008), Serbian orthopedic surgeon and traumatologist, born in Kruševac and lived and died in Belgrade

== Scholars ==
- Bogumil Hrabak (1927-2010), Serbian historian, university professor and pedagogue, born in Zrenjanin and lived and died in Belgrade
- Boris Begović (born 1956), economic scholar
- Đurađ Bošković (1904-1990), Serbian art historian of Serbian medieval architecture
- Gordan Lazarević, Canadian musicologist, university department head
- Ivan Avakumović, History professor at the University of British Columbia and author
- Jelena Kovacevic, American engineering professor and university leader
- Paulina Lebl-Albala, feminist, translator, literary critic, literature theoretician, and professor
- Thomas Nagel, philosopher
- Slobodan Antonić (born 1959), political scientist, sociologist and university professor

== Business ==
- Ana Kras, American furniture and fashion designer, photographer, artist
- Jelena Behrend, American jewelry designer
- Sacha Lakic, French automobile and furniture designer
- Veselin Jevrosimović, CEO of IT company ComTrade Group

== Politics ==
- Aleksandar I Obrenović (1876–1903), King of Serbia, last ruler of the House of Obrenović
- Atilla the Hun, used the city as a military base for his further penetration into the Balkans, between 441 and 443 AD, a decade before his death in 453; he is presumably buried 70 km north of the city
- Danica Karađorđević (born 1986), Hereditary Princess of Serbia and Yugoslavia and graphic designer
- Filip Karađorđević (born 1982), Hereditary Prince of Serbia and Yugoslavia, born in Fairfax, Virginia, United States and lives in Belgrade
- Jovian, Flavius Claudius Iovianus, Emperor of Rome, born in the city in 332 AD, restored Christianity as the official religion of the Roman Empire
- Jelisaveta Karađorđević (born 1936), Princess of Yugoslavia, political activist, and former presidential candidate for Serbia
- Josip Broz Tito (1892–1980), Yugoslav president, founder of socialist Yugoslavia and co-founder of Non-Aligned Movement
- Jovanka Broz (1924–2013), first lady of Yugoslavia and wife of Josip Broz Tito, born in Pećane near Udbina and lived and died in Belgrade
- Laurent-Désiré Kabila, former president of the Congo
- Lisa Gavrić (1907-1974; born as Elisabeth Bechmann), Austrian communist, born in Vienna, Austria and lived in Belgrade
- Mihailo Obrenović, Prince of Serbia, proclaimed Belgrade the capital city of the Principality of Serbia in 1841
- Novica Antić (born 1978), political activist and president of the Military Trade Union of Serbia
- Pavle Karađorđević, Prince of Yugoslavia
- Petar I Karađorđević, King of Serbia and later King of Yugoslavia
- Slobodan Milošević, late president of Serbia and Yugoslavia
- Stefan Dragutin, first King of Serbia to rule the city, made Belgrade the capital of his Kingdom of Syrmia in 1284
- Stefan Lazarević, Despot of Serbia, made Belgrade the capital city of Serbian Despotate in 1404
- Zoran Đinđić (1952–2003), prime minister of Serbia and mayor of Belgrade
- Aleksandar Vučić (born 1970), president of Serbia

== Clergy ==
- Atanasije Antonijević (1734-1804), Serbian archpriest of Bukovik, one of the leading people of the Serbian Revolution, born in Bukovik and lived in Belgrade

== Criminals ==
- Isa Lero "Džamba", criminal

== Military ==
- David Albala (1886–1942), military officer, physician, diplomat, and Jewish community leader, born in Belgrade
- Dragutin Gavrilović, colonel of the Serbian Army in World War I and the defender of Belgrade in 1915
- Mihailo Golubović (1889–1941), Serbian and Yugoslav soldier and a brigadier general of the Royal Yugoslav Army
- Milisav Čamdžija (1785–1815), warrior during the First Serbian Uprising, born in Veliki Borak in Belgrade
- Stepa Stepanović, field marshal (vojvoda) of Serbian Army
- Tasa Donić (1863-1939), Chetnik duke participant in the Serbian liberation wars of 1912–1918, born in Orašac and lived and died in Belgrade

== Sports ==
=== Basketball ===
- Bogdan Bogdanović, National Basketball Association (NBA) player for the Atlanta Hawks
- Marko Jarić, NBA player

=== Football ===
- Edin Ajdinović (born 2001), football central midfielder, born in Belgrade

=== High Jumping ===
- Dragutin Topić, high jumper, gold medallist at the 1990 European Athletics Championships

=== Racewalking ===
- Shaul Ladany, Israeli world-record-holding Olympic racewalker, Bergen-Belsen survivor, Munich Massacre survivor, and Professor of Industrial Engineering

=== Rugby ===
- Radoslav Novaković, rugby player

=== Swimming ===
- Luka Stevanović, swimmer and IT expert

=== Tennis ===
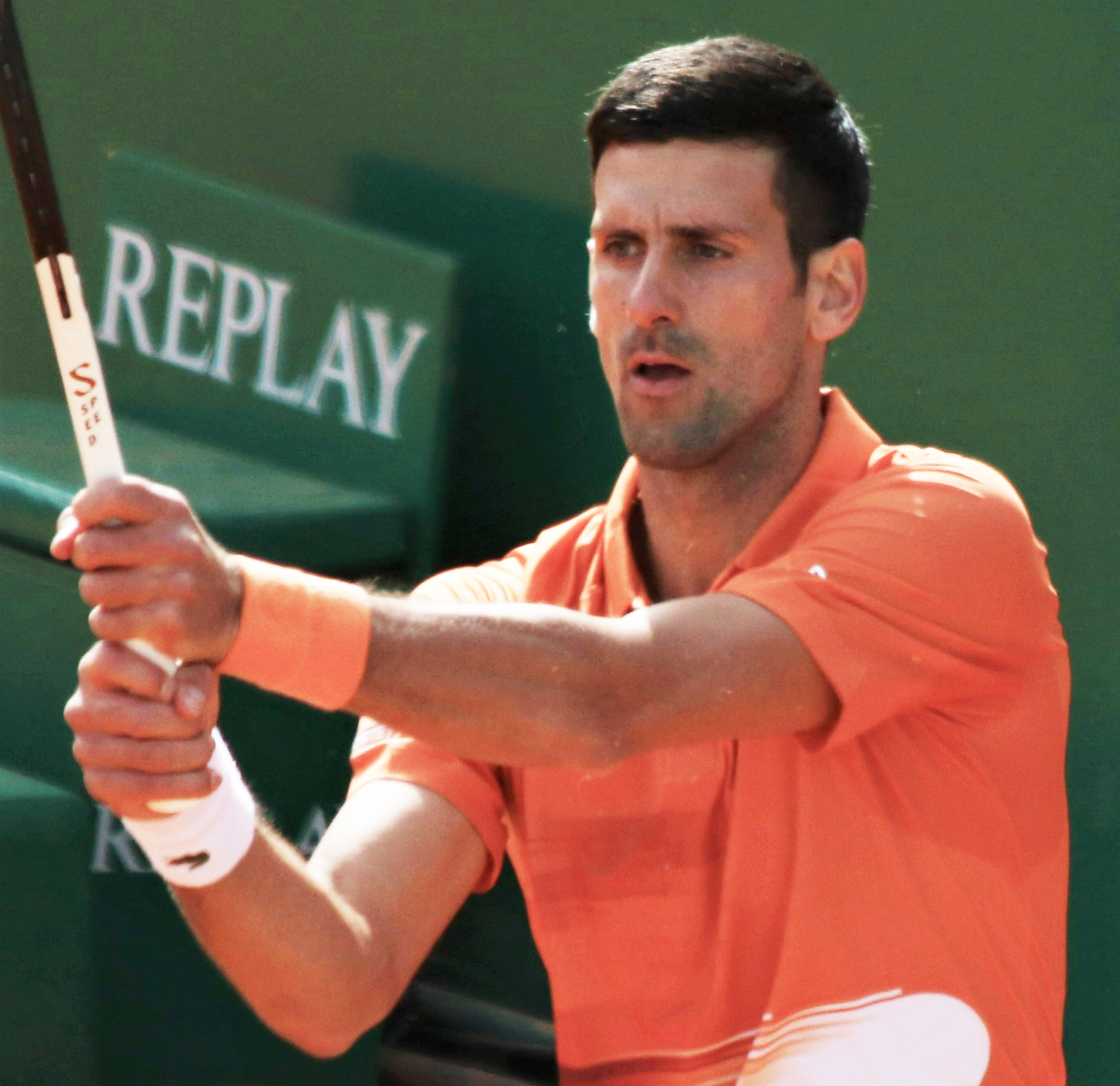
Novak Đoković

- Ana Ivanovic, WTA tennis player; former World No. 1 in singles
- Daniel Nestor (Danijel Nestorović), Canadian Olympic Gold tennis player
- Janko Tipsarević, ATP tennis player
- Jelena Dokić, WTA tennis player
- Jelena Janković, WTA tennis player; former World No. 1 in singles
- Novak Đoković, ATP tennis player (World No.4) now former World No.1

=== Wrestling ===
- Zurabi Datunashvili (born 1991), Georgian-born Serbian Greco-Roman wrestler, born in Tbilisi, Georgia and lives in Belgrade

== See also ==
- List of honorary citizens of Belgrade
- List of people from Novi Sad
