= List of honorary citizens of Niš =

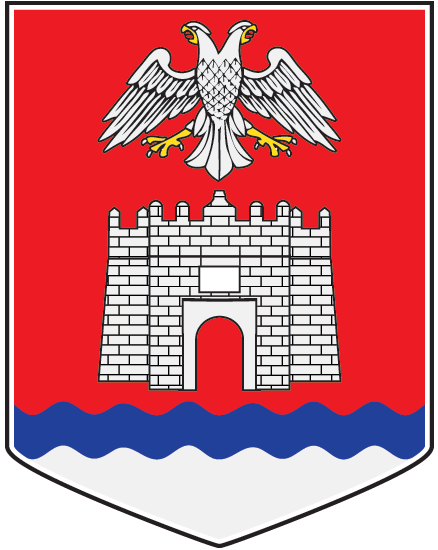
Niš Coat of Arms

Honorary citizen of Niš is a title awarded by the leadership of Niš on behalf of the city.

== Requirements ==
The title can be awarded to both a citizen of Serbia and any other state as a politician or statesman, as well as a representative of a non-governmental organization or an artist. A candidate for honorary citizenship of Niš must have a contribution to the development of science, art, humanitarian activities, etc., which has helped the development and image of Niš, and the development of democracy in Serbia and the world. The decision to award the title is made by the City Assembly.

== History ==
The first honorary citizen of Niš was King Milan I Obrenović due to his liberation of Niš from Turkish rule. The historical archive does not possess a document on when exactly King Milan was declared an honorary citizen, but there are documents from which this information is indirectly obtained. The second honorary citizen was Thomas Lipton some time after 1915.

The year of 2000 is when the title was officially established in modern times by the Assembly of Niš.

Since 2000, the title of honorary citizen of Niš has been given most to humanitarians from Greece.

== List of honorary citizens ==
The list includes people who have been awarded the title of honorary citizen of Niš.

No.	Name	Portrait	Date	Notes	Country	Ref(s)
1	Milan I Obrenović (1854–1901)		Unknown	King of Serbia. For liberating Niš from Turkish rule.	Kingdom of Serbia	
2	Thomas Lipton (1848–1931)		Unknown	Scotsman of Irish parentage, founder of the Lipton Tea company, merchant, philanthropist and yachtsman. For his philanthropic mission in Serbia, for transporting medical personnel, medical supplies and humanitarian aid on his ships for the needs of Serbian hospitals during World War I in 1915.	United Kingdom	
3	Kyriaky Panagiotidy		2000	Greek humanitarian. For delivering a convoy of humanitarian aid to children and those who have been killed in the war during the height of the NATO bombing of Yugoslavia, for her yearly humanitarian efforts aiding children in need, families, and citizens of Niš and organizing excursions for Serbian children to Greece.	Greece	
4	Hans Ola Urstad (1951—)		2005	Norwegian ambassador to Serbia (2001–2005). For selflessly advocating for the development of the City of Niš, contributions to the development of the co-operation between the city of Niš and the Kingdom of Norway, strengthening relationships between Norway and Serbia.	Norway	
5	Dimitrious Xenitellis		2005	Greek consul of the Republic of Greece in Niš (2001–2005). For his efforts in developing friendly relations between Serbia and Greece, delivering humanitarian aid from Greece and improve economic, political, cultural, sports, and all other forms of co-operation between Niš and the surrounding regions of Serbia with its partners in Greece.	Greece	
6	Harry Anastastasiou		May 2007	Greek humanitarian and founder of the Benjamin Humanitarian Organization. For providing assistance for the children who have lost their fathers in the war on the territory of the former Yugoslavia, for humanitarian actions such as organization of summer vacation for those children in Greece, English language courses and computing.	Greece	
7	Joana Anastastasiou		May 2007	Greek humanitarian and founder of the Benjamin Humanitarian Organization. For providing assistance for the children who have lost their fathers in the war on the territory of the former Yugoslavia, for humanitarian actions such as organization of summer vacation for those children in Greece, English language courses and computing.	Greece	
8	Lidia Ramírez		2008	Brazilian politician and head of the UN-Habitat Office in Serbia. For her selfless dedication in representing Niš in the world, for the great professional assistance she provided in the development of the mid-term Nis City Development Strategy and for significantly helping the refugees and displaced persons who found shelter in Niš.	Brazil	
9	Candy Dulfer (1969—)		13 August 2017	Dutch jazz and pop saxophonist. For continuously promoting Niš through appearances in the national media in the Netherlands and throughout the world during her tour and festival performances on all continents since her first performance at since at Nisville Jazz Festival in 2009.	Netherlands	

== See also ==
- List of honorary citizens of Belgrade
- List of honorary citizens of Novi Sad
- List of honorary citizens of Zrenjanin
