= Nune =

Nune may refer to:

== People ==
- Nune Hairapetian (born 1951), Armenian musician
- Nune Popović (born 1974), Serbian activist
- Nune Siravyan (born 1973), Armenian artist
- Nune Tumanyan (born 1963), Armenian artist
- Nune Yesayan, Armenian singer

== Other ==
- Nune (crater), on Mars
