= List of honorary citizens of Zrenjanin =

Zrenjanin Coat of Arms

Honorary citizen of Zrenjanin is a title awarded by the leadership of the Serbian city of Zrenjanin on behalf of the city.

== List of honorary citizens ==
The list includes people who have been awarded the title of honorary citizen of Zrenjanin.

No.	Name	Portrait	Date	Notes	Country	Ref(s)
1	Mór Jókai (1825–1904)		1893	Hungarian nobleman, novelist, dramatist and revolutionary.	Austria-Hungary	
2	Mihajlo Pupin (1858–1935)		1921	Serbian physicist, physical chemist and philanthropist based in the United States.	United States	
3	Edouard Herriot (1872–1957)		1933	French Radical politician of the Third Republic who served three times as Prime Minister and for many years as President of the Chamber of Deputies.	French Third Republic	
4	Petar Živković (1879–1947)		1936	Serbian military officer, political figure, and Prime Minister of the Kingdom of Yugoslavia (1929–1932).	Kingdom of Yugoslavia	
5	Milan Stojadinović (1888–1961)		1936	Serbian and Yugoslav politician and economist who served as the Prime Minister of Yugoslavia (1935–1939), as Foreign Minister (1935–1939) and as Minister of Finance (1922–1924, 1924–1926, 1934–1935).	Kingdom of Yugoslavia	
6	Josip Broz Tito (1892—1980)		1962	Yugoslav President of Yugoslavia, Marshal of Yugoslavia and President of the League of Communists of Yugoslavia	Yugoslavia	
7	Jovan Veselinov (1906–1982)		1982	Serbian and Yugoslav communist politician, President of Serbia, Prime Minister of Serbia and Chairman of the League of Communists of Serbia. He was a Partisan fighter in World War II, and was proclaimed People's Hero of Yugoslavia.	Yugoslavia	
8	Dragoslav Avramović (1919–2001)		1994	Serbian economist and the governor of the National Bank of Yugoslavia in Serbia and Montenegro.	Federal Republic of Yugoslavia	

== See also ==
- List of honorary citizens of Belgrade
- List of honorary citizens of Niš
- List of honorary citizens of Novi Sad
