= Agent of influence =

Person influencing public opinion for a foreign power

Agent of influence is a term describing people who use their position to influence the decision making or public opinion in one country to produce results beneficial to another.

The term is used both to describe conscious agents operating under the control of an intelligence service and people who may be classed as "useful idiots" that is, someone unaware of how their actions further the interests of a foreign power. A related concept is that of a front organization.

Critics have argued that the term can be applied to people who simply act according to their political views.

The Foreign Agents Registration Act (FARA) was enacted in 1938, and 22 U.S.Code § 611 et seq provides detailed definitions of what constitutes an agent of influence under US Law.

== Characteristics ==
As described by users of the concept the primary characteristic that distinguishes agents of influence from spies is the absence of involvement in espionage or other criminal activities. Thus, the term may be applied to political actors whose views are seen as supporting another country.

According to Angelo Codevilla, using these agents is an act of war "in the same sense that armies crashing across border or airplanes dropping bombs are acts of war because their results can be as intrusive or conclusive as the results of armies or bombs."

== Criticism ==
Criticising the concept, John Girling writes

'Agents of Influence' is an intriguing conception, whose meaning is as mysterious as its origins, and whose attribution reflects as much on the user as on the 'used'. With its vague and rather sinister undertones of manipulation and deceit such a hybrid expression lends itself easily to innuendo and abuse. It is not surprising, therefore, that the prejudiced or the merely careless should characterise those whose political views they dislike, not as agents of a foreign power (for the allegation lacks any concrete proof), but as 'agents of influence' working wittingly or unwittingly either for the American CIA or the Soviet KGB

== Alleged agents of influence ==
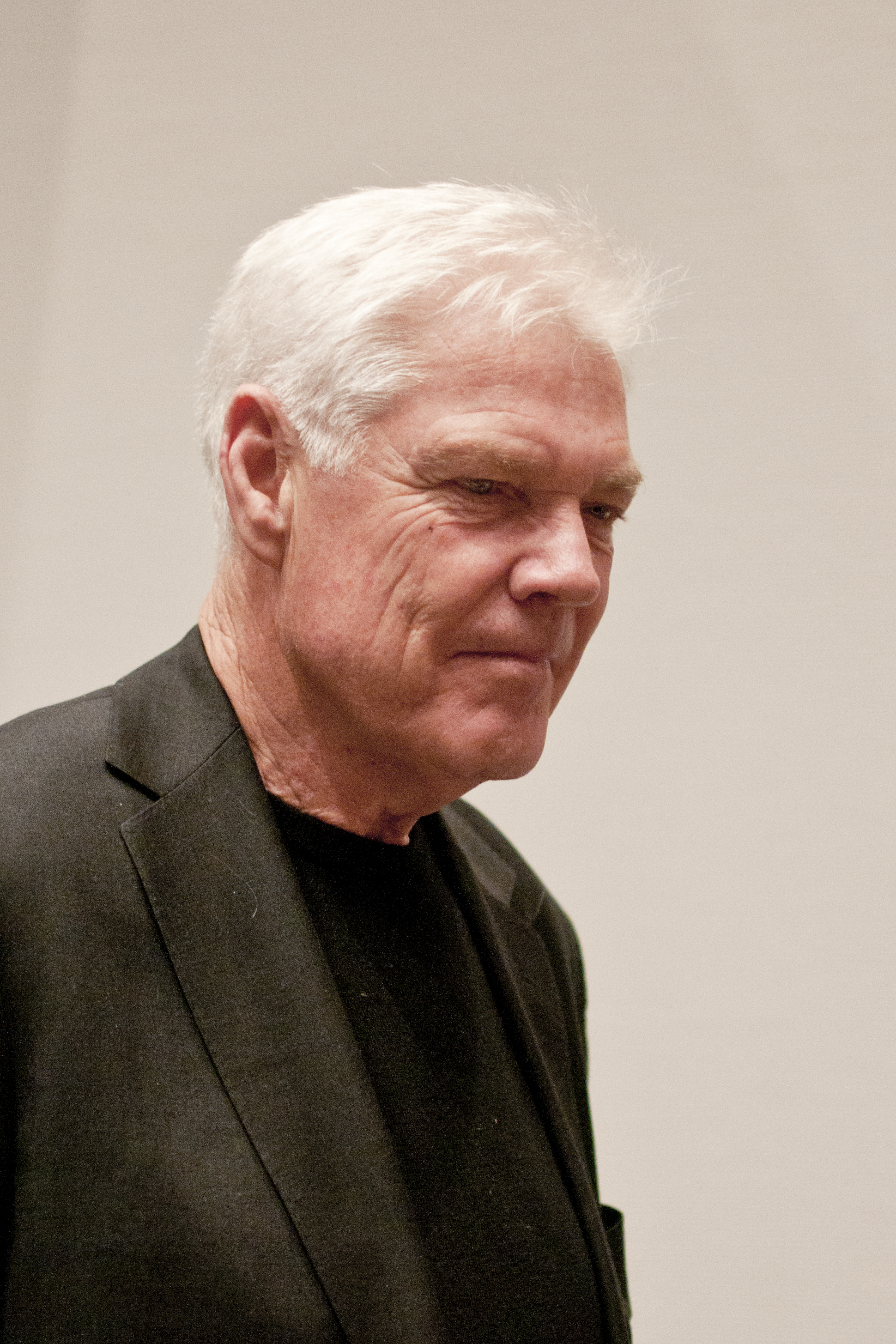
Accused agent of influence and convicted spy Arne Treholt

- Alger Hiss: an agent of influence and spy. At the time of his exposure he had significant support among US politicians and only went to jail for lying under oath about passing documents to the Soviet Union.
- Arne Treholt: convicted of espionage, continued to advocate for Russia after his release
- Richard Gott: Guardian journalist who took expenses-paid trips from the KGB.
- David Combe, an Australian political lobbyist was accused of being an "agent of influence" on the basis of a friendship with Soviet diplomat (and accused agent) Valery Ivanov. He was subsequently exonerated. A register of lobbyists was established as a result of these events
- Novica Antić, chair of the Serbian Military Trade Union, alleged to be a Russian agent of influence meeting with members of the European Parliament.
- Donald Trump: 45th and 47th president of the United States, alleged to be a Russian agent of influence by experienced intelligence personnel, such as "veteran American spies, spymasters, and spy-catchers", including Leon Panetta.

== See also ==
- McCarthyism
- Mole (espionage)
- Red Scare
- Sleeper agent
- Useful idiot
