= Tatjana Đorđević =

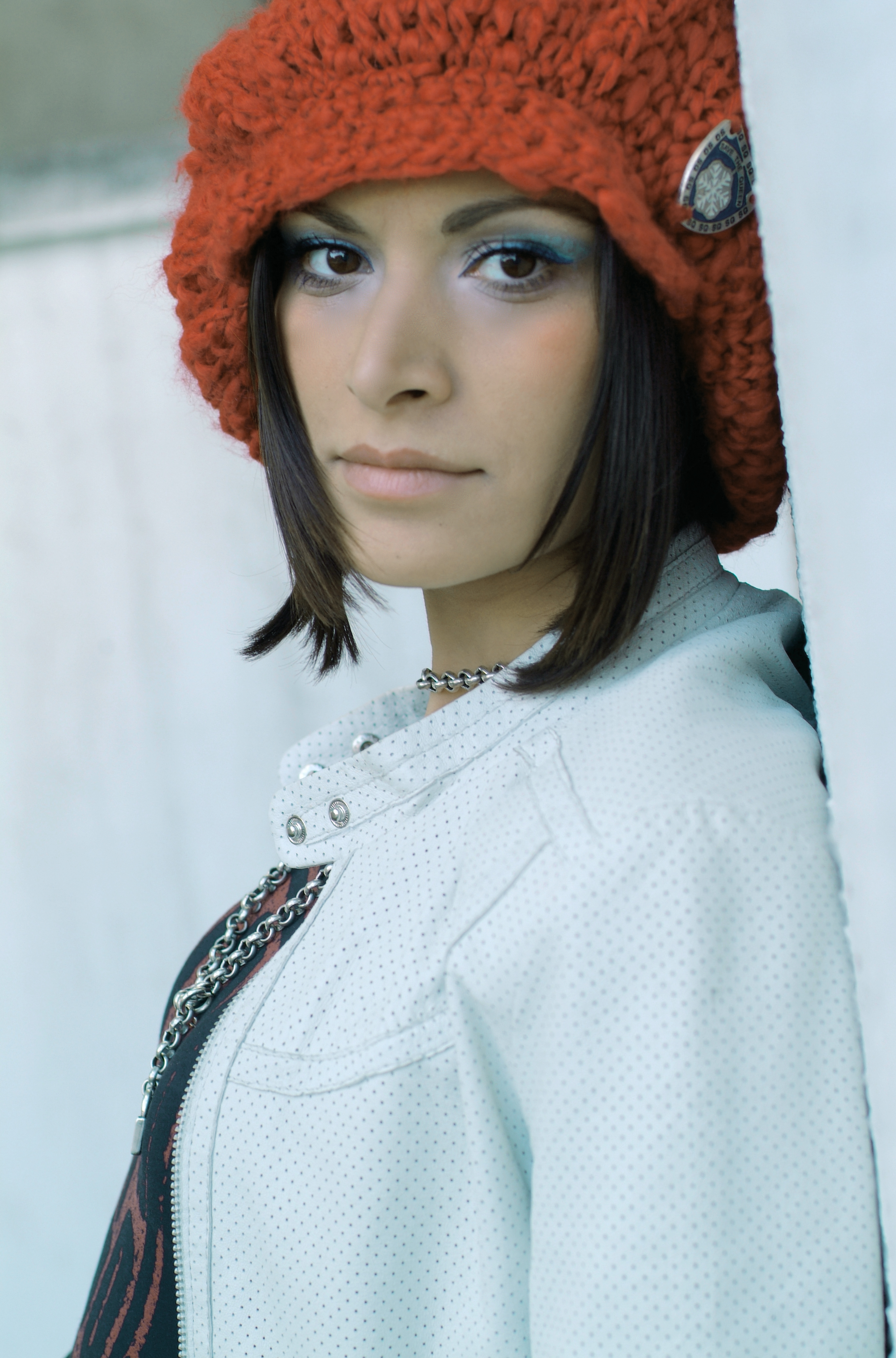
- Tatjana Đorđević – Cica

Background information
- Also known as: Cica
- Born: Tatjana Đorđević; March 3, 1985 (age 41); Belgrade, SR Serbia, SFR Yugoslavia
- Genre: Rock
- Occupation: Singer
- Years active: 2004–present
- Label: PGP RTS
- Formerly of: Strip

Tatjana Đorđević (Serbian Cyrillic: Татјана Ђорђевић; born March 3, 1985, in Belgrade, Serbia, SFR Yugoslavia) is a Serbian singer.

== Career ==
Surrounded with music throughout her childhood, Tatjana Djordjevic began singing while very young. At age 13, she won a competition called "Kids Are Singing Hits" singing "My Heart Will Go On" by Celine Dion.

In 2000, Tatjana won second prize in the competition "First Voice of Yugoslavia" with the song "Zajdi zajdi". With the same song she was second in 2001 at "First Voice of Serbia". In 2002, she participated in the popular kids' musical show "Bajone Express". She won the award Hit of the Week and soon Hit of October. She also won Hit of the Year against the other winners of monthly hits.

In 2003, Tatjana formed her first band "Zabranjena zona" and competed at Rock Invasion of Belgrade's High Schools. Tatjana won first prize and best vocal performance, and the band came second. In the finals they played Tracy's Flaw by Skunk Anansie.

In 2003 and 2004, she entered "Idol" and made her way into the finals. After the show, she went on tour with the other finalists.

After the tour in 2005, Tatjana began working with Mirko and Snežana Vukomanović, who wrote her song "Ko je kriv". With that song Tatjana competed in "Beovizija" and Evrop(j)esma in Montenegro. (Beovizija 05), (Evrop(j)esma 05)

From 2006, she was the lead singer in the Belgrade rock band "Strip" (Strip). In 2006, she was first shown to the public as Strip's singer in the music video "Djuka". After that, Tatjana began work on her first solo album and Strip's second album called "Psihomehaničar", from which were released two singles: "Psihomehaničar" and "Štiklom u čelo”

In 2009, Tatjana "lent" her voice to the first Serbian animated movie called Technotise: Edit & I for the character of Sanja.

She sang at Exit festival in 2006 and 2008 with her band Strip, and at many other festivals.

== Albums ==
Psihomehaničar – (2008)
