= List of honorary citizens of Belgrade =

Belgrade Coat of Arms

Honorary citizen of Belgrade is a title awarded by the leadership of Belgrade on behalf of the city.

== Requirements ==
The title can be awarded to both a citizen of Serbia and any other state, as a politician or statesman, as well as a representative of a non-governmental organization or an artist. A candidate for honorary citizenship of Belgrade must have a contribution to the development of science, art, humanitarian activities, etc., which has helped the development and image of Belgrade, the development of democracy in Serbia and the world. The decision to award the title is made by the City Assembly (Parliament). Candidates are nominated by the City Council or at least 10 councilors.

A person who has received the title of honorary citizen of Belgrade is presented with an official letter on official paper at an official meeting of the Assembly. A citizen of Serbia receives it on City Day, and a representative of another country receives it during their visit to Belgrade.

== History ==
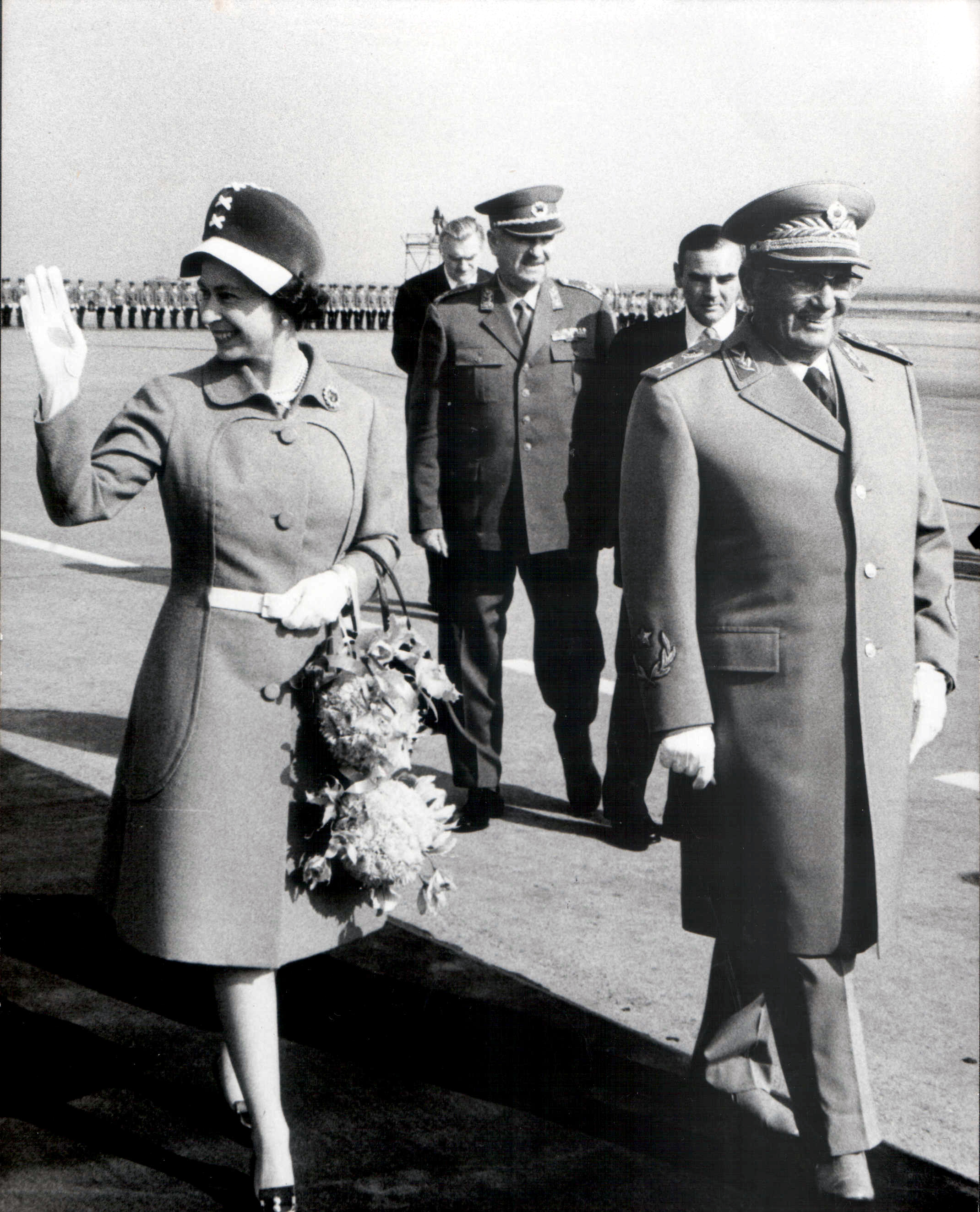
Elizabeth II next to Josip Broz Tito during her visit to Belgrade, Yugoslavia, 17 October 1972

The first to receive this title was General Peko Dapčević on 19 October 1945, who led the liberation of Belgrade in the autumn of 1944. On Yugoslav Youth Day in 1947, the title were given to the head of the Yugoslav Communist Party, Josip Broz Tito, Fyodor Tolbukhin, marshal of the Soviet Union, and Vladimir Zhdanov, general of the Soviet army.

On 19 July 1954 (the year when the title was officially established), for the first time, the leader of a foreign state, the Emperor of Ethiopia, Haile Selassie, became an honorary citizen of Belgrade. Of the foreign leaders after him, the title was awarded to Jawaharlal Nehru, Gamal Abdel Nasser, Norodom Sihanouk, Leonid Brezhnev and others. Despite the warm relations of Josip Broz Tito with a number of leaders of Western European countries, only Elizabeth II, Queen of the United Kingdom, became an honorary citizen of Belgrade during his life (and currently the only woman to be assigned this title). Till 1985, honorary citizens of Belgrade were high foreign officials, who were visiting SFR Yugoslavia. After 1985, the title was not awarded for more than 21 years. The title was reintroduced in 2006. Until 2006, an honorary Belgrade citizen could only become someone who was a senior foreign politician, statesman or military leader. Nelson Mandela received it in 2007.

At the beginning of the 21st century, Bill Gates and Michael Schumacher were nominated as candidates for honorary citizens of Belgrade . Serbian historian Aleksandar Životić explained this by the breakdown of the socialist bloc and globalization, in an era in which society chooses new heroes.

In 2015, Nikita Mikhalkov and Peter Handke are the first artists to become honorary citizens of the Serbian capital.

== List of honorary citizens ==
The list includes people who have been awarded the title of honorary citizen of Belgrade.

No.	Name	Portrait	Date	Notes	Country	Ref(s)
1	Petar Dapčević (1913—1999)		20 October 1945	Lieutenant general of JNA and Order of the People's Hero	Yugoslavia	
2	Josip Broz Tito (1892—1980)		25 May 1947	President of Yugoslavia, Marshal of Yugoslavia and President of the League of Communists of Yugoslavia	Yugoslavia	
3	Fyodor Tolbukhin (1894—1949)		25 May 1947	Marshal of the Soviet Union, Hero of the Soviet Union, Hero of the People's Republic of Bulgaria and Order of the People's Hero	USSR	
4	Vladimir Zhdanov (1902—1964)		25 May 1947	Colonel general of tank troops in the Soviet Armed Forces	USSR	
5	Haile Selassie I (1892—1975)		22 July 1954	Emperor of Ethiopia	Ethiopian Empire	
6	Jawaharlal Nehru (1889—1964)		24 June 1955	Prime Minister of India	India	
7	Gamal Abdel Nasser (1918—1970)		23 July 1956	President of Egypt	Egypt	
8	Norodom Sihanouk (1922—2012)		20 September 1959	King of Cambodia	Cambodia	
9	Leonid Brezhnev (1906—1982)		20 September 1962	Chairman of the Council of Ministers (Soviet Union)	USSR	
10	Ahmed Ben Bella (1918—2012)		6 March 1964	President of Algeria	Algeria	
11	Habib Bourguiba (1903—2000)		31 March 1965	President of the Republic of Tunisia	Tunisia	
12	Lal Bahadur Shastri (1904—1966)		18 July 1965	Prime Minister of India	India	
13	Edvard Kardelj (1910—1979)		24 January 1970	federal political leader of SFR Yugoslavia and Order of the People's Hero	Yugoslavia	
14	Kenneth Kaunda (1924—2021)		6 May 1970	President of Zambia	Zambia	
15	Elizabeth II (1952—2022)		17 October 1972	Queen of the United Kingdom	United Kingdom	
16	Edward Gierek (1913—2001)		8 May 1973	President of the Polish United Workers' Party	Polish People's Republic	
17	Nicolae Ceaușescu (1918—1989)		19 September 1976	President of Romania и General Secretary of the Romanian Communist Party	Socialist Republic of Romania	
18	Hua Guofeng (1921—2008)		22 August 1978	Premier of China and Chairman of the Chinese Communist Party	China	
19	Jaber Al-Ahmad Al-Jaber Al-Sabah (1926—2006)		17 September 1981	Emir and thirteenth Sheikh of Kuwait	Kuwait	
20	François Mitterrand (1916—1996)		16 December 1983	President of France	France	
21	Kim Il Sung (1912—1994)		19 June 1984	President of North Korea	North Korea	
22	Li Xiannian (1909—1992)		4 September 1984	President of China	China	
23	Miguel de la Madrid (1934—2012)		26 January 1985	President of Mexico	Mexico	
24	Julius Nyerere (1922—1999)		15 March 1985	President of Tanzania	Tanzania	
25	Nelson Mandela (1918—2013)		15 May 2007	President of South Africa	South Africa	
26	Miguel Ángel Moratinos (1951—)		6 October 2009	Spain's Minister of Foreign Affairs	Spain	
27	Tadashi Nagai (1943—)		7 June 2010	Japanese Ambassador to Serbia	Japan	
28	Li Keqiang (1955—2023)		18 December 2014	Premier of China	China	
29	Nikita Mikhalkov (1945—)		17 April 2015	Soviet and Russian filmmaker, actor, and head of the Russian Cinematographers' Union	Russia	
30	Peter Handke (1942—)		21 May 2015	Austrian novelist, playwright, translator, poet, film director, screenwriter, Nobel Prize winner	Austria	
31	Thorvald Stoltenberg (1931—2018)		1 October 2015	Norwegian politician	Norway	
32	Arne Sannes Bjørnstad (1965—)		6 December 2016	Norwegian ambassador for Serbia	Norway	

== See also ==
- List of people from Belgrade
- List of honorary citizens of Niš
- List of honorary citizens of Novi Sad
- List of honorary citizens of Zrenjanin
