= Luka Stevanović =

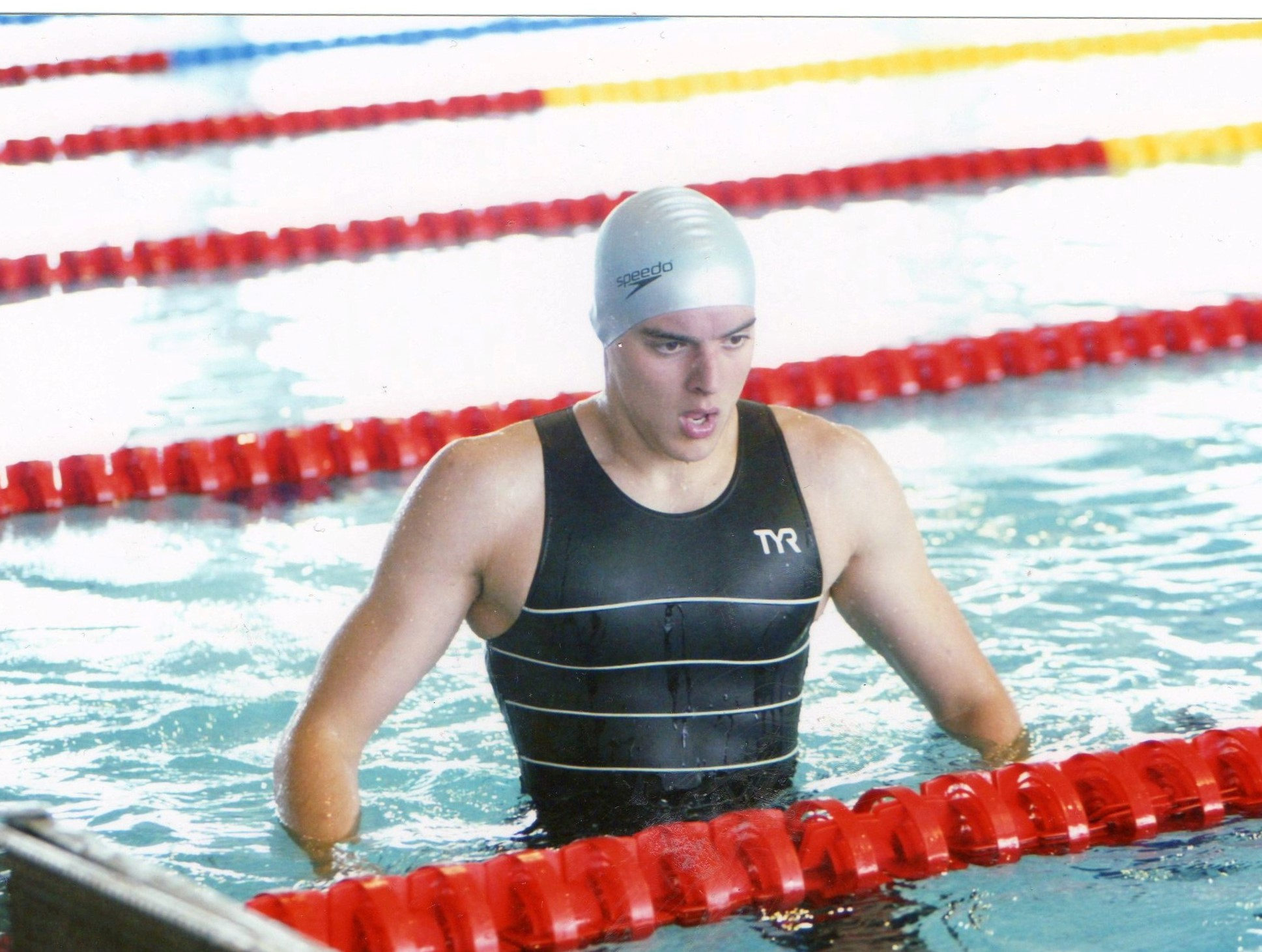

Personal information
- Full name: Luka Stevanović
- Nationality: Serbia
- Born: May 18, 1991 (age 35) Belgrade, SFR Yugoslavia
- Height: 1.91 m (6 ft 3 in)
- Weight: 91 kg (201 lb)

Sport
- Sport: Swimming
- Strokes: Butterfly, Freestyle
- Club: PK Vračar, Belgrade
Medal record
Serbian Junior Championships
Silver medal – second place	2009 Belgrade	50 m butterfly
Bronze medal – third place	2009 Belgrade	50 m freestyle
Serbian Junior Championships - Short Course
Bronze medal – third place	2009 Zrenjanin	50 m freestyle

Luka Stevanović (Serbian Cyrillic: Лука Стевановић, born May 18, 1991, in Belgrade, SFR Yugoslavia) is a retired swimmer from Serbia. He was a member of Swimming Club Vračar Belgrade. He competed in 50m butterfly, 50m and 100m freestyle.

== Career ==
=== Professional career ===
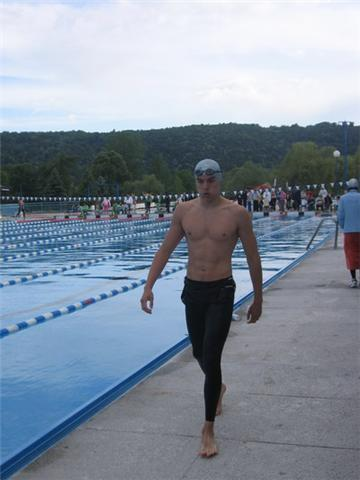
Stevanović after a race in Valjevo

Luka Stevanović started his swimming career in 2004, in Swimming Club Belgrade, located on Tašmajdan swimming pool, under leadership of his coach Slavko Kurbanović, former Serbian Olympian who competed in 1968 Summer Olympics in Mexico City. In the first few years at the club he was competing in breaststroke. During his time at the club his best results were quite average, despite his big talent. The main reason for that was that he was swimming breaststroke, a stroke that was not his natural. He left the club at year 2007.

In April 2007 Stevanović made a move to swimming club Vračar, based in Belgrade's municipality Vračar. That proved to be a great move, since he started making progress really fast. His new coach, Nikola Mirčetić, has changed his strokes to freestyle and butterfly, which proved to be his natural strokes. He started winning medals in almost every race he was competing in. The best year of his career was 2009. During that year Stevanović became Serbian vice champion in 50m butterfly, and was also 3rd in 50m freestyle on Serbian National Junior Championships. Besides that, he has won many medals on many important swim meets both in Serbia, and abroad. He was almost always champion of Belgrade in his strokes. In 2011, due to problems with spinal disc herniation he was forced to retire from competitive swimming.

=== Masters Swimming ===
In 2017, Stevanović made his return to swimming, and started competing in Masters swimming events. In August 2017 he was participant in 2017 FINA World Masters Championships in Budapest. He was a member of Serbian relay team in 4x50m freestyle that finished in 7th position.

In 2018, he competed at the 2018 European Masters Swimming Championships in Kranj, Slovenia. He was in a Serbian relay team that won the 4th place in the 4x50m medley relay, in which he was swimming freestyle.

In November 2023 he competed at Serbian Masters Championship in Novi Sad, and won gold medal in 4x50m medley relay, silver medal in 4x50m freestyle relay and bronze medals in 50m freestyle and 50m butterfly.

== See also ==
- List of Serbian records in swimming
- List of people from Belgrade
