= List of honorary citizens of Novi Sad =

Novi Sad Coat of Arms

Honorary citizen of Novi Sad is a title awarded by the leadership of Novi Sad on behalf of the city.

== Requirements ==
The title can be awarded to both a citizen of Serbia and any other state, as a politician or statesman, as well as a representative of a non-governmental organization or an artist. A candidate for honorary citizenship of Novi Sad must have a contribution to the development of science, art, humanitarian activities, etc., which has helped the development and image of Novi Sad, the development of democracy in Serbia and the world. The decision to award the title is made by the City Assembly.

A person who has received the title of honorary citizen of Novi Sad is presented with an official letter on official paper at an official meeting of the Assembly. An honorary citizen is given the city symbol in the form of a gilded key with the emblem of Novi Sad.

== History ==
The first honorary citizen of Novi Sad was Nikola Tesla by the decision of the Assembly of the city on 10 July 1936. He was awarded this title due to the 80th anniversary of his birth, his worldwide contributions in the fields of physics and engineering, and bringing glory to the Serbian people and the people of the Kingdom of Yugoslavia. After World War II, the second honorary citizen was Josip Vidmar in 1970.

On 16 October 1992 (the year when the title was officially established), the Assembly of Novi Sad made the decision where the title of honorary citizen is given to any prominent figures from the country and abroad who, through their work in establishing and developing co-operation with Novi Sad, have made a significant contribution to the city's interests and needs.

Since its existence, most people given the title of honorary citizen are humanitarians.

== List of honorary citizens ==
The list includes people who have been awarded the title of honorary citizen of Novi Sad.

No.	Name	Portrait	Date	Notes	Country	Ref(s)
1	Nikola Tesla (1856—1943)		10 July 1936	Serbian-American inventor, electrical engineer, mechanical engineer, and futurist. For the 80th anniversary of his birth, his worldwide contributions in the fields of physics and engineering, and bringing glory to the Serbian people and the people of the Kingdom of Yugoslavia.	United States	
2	Josip Vidmar (1895–1992)		1970	Slovenian literary critic, essayist, and politician. For his creative work in the fields of literature and art, for activity and participation in the public and political life of socialist Yugoslavia, and for his 15 years of valuable work and contribution for the growth of Sterijino pozorje of Serbian National Theater.	Yugoslavia	
3	Vyacheslav Klykov (1939—2006)		1992	Russian sculptor of public monuments. For his contribution to the promotion and enrichment of the co-operation between the Russian and Serbian peoples, and for his gift to Novi Sad and the Serbian people of the statue of Saint Sergius of Radonezh in Danube Park.	Russia	
4	Monica Seles (1973—)		1993	Hungarian tennis player and former world No. 1 from Novi Sad. For her contribution to the affirmation, popularization and spreading the knowledge about Yugoslavia and Novi Sad abroad.	Federal Republic of Yugoslavia	
5	Peter Beckley		1993	British humanitarian and founder of the Norfolk and Norwich Novi Sad Association. For his contribution to the development, improvement and enriching of all forms of co-operation between Norwich and Novi Sad.	United Kingdom	
6	Diana Beckley		1993	British humanitarian and founder of the Norfolk and Norwich Novi Sad Association. For her contribution to the development, improvement and enriching of all forms of co-operation between Norwich and Novi Sad.	United Kingdom	
7	Alberto Salvato		1994	Italian humanitarian. For his devotion and selfless engagement in collecting humanitarian aid throughout Italy for children who have lost one or both parents in the Yugoslav wars.	Italy	
8	Hannelore Lamché		1999	German humanitarian. For her selfless commitment to the mission and delivery of humanitarian aid to children and young people with mental and physical disabilities, as well as for strengthening the reputation of the city of Novi Sad in its partner city of Dortmund and throughout the Federal Republic of Germany.	Germany	
9	Mikis Theodorakis (1925—2021)		1 February 2004	Greek composer and lyricist. For his great friendship, love and appreciation towards Novi Sad and its people by the wonderful music of the ballet "Grk Zorba" with which he contributed to the affirmation of Novi Sad as a city of culture.	Greece	
10	Siniša Mihajlović (1969—2022)		2006	Serbian professional football manager and former footballer. For bringing glory to Novi Sad and Serbia for his contributions in international sports and for his humanitarian aid towards children and young people who have lost one or both parents in the Yugoslav wars.	Serbia and Montenegro	
11	Vladimir Putin (1952—)		25 January 2008	Russian politician and the President of Russia. For his huge contribution in preserving the sovereignty and territorial integrity of the Republic of Serbia and strengthening its international political position during trying times.	Russia	
12	Efraim Zuroff (1948—)		22 January 2009	American-born Israeli historian, Nazi hunter and director of the "Simon Wiesenthal" Center. For his fight for justice for all the victims of the fascist terror and his immeasurable contribution in bringing justice for the victims of the fascist Raid in Novi Sad.	United States; Israel	
13	Jean-Pierre Lotz		2016	French doctor and professor. For his long-standing commitment to the training of Novi Sad's oncology doctors, his contribution to the application of autologous peripheral stem cell transplantation, for exams and consultations carried out on a gratuitous basis, for drug donations and for the consolidation of the most modern medical instruments of the city of Novi Sad.	France	

== See also ==
- List of people from Novi Sad
- List of honorary citizens of Belgrade
- List of honorary citizens of Niš
- List of honorary citizens of Zrenjanin
