= Technotise: Edit & I =

- Original theatrical poster
- Directed by: Aleksa Gajić
- Written by: Aleksa Gajić
- Starring: Sanda Knežević; Igor Bugarski; Tatjana Đorđević; Nikola Đuričko; Nebojša Glogovac; Marija Karan; Petar Kralj; Srđan Miletić; Boris Milivojević; Jelisaveta Sabljić; Srđan Todorović; Vlasta Velisavljević
- Music by: Boris Furduj; Slobodan Štrumberger
- Production companies: Yodi Movie Craftsman; Black White 'N' Green
- Release date: September 28, 2009
- Running time: 90 minutes
- Country: Serbia
- Languages: Serbian, German (Dub); English (Sub)
- Budget: $900,000

Technotise: Edit & I (Serbian: Едит и Jа, Edit i Ja) is a 2009 Serbian animated feature film. Written and directed by comic artist Aleksa Gajić, it is a sequel of his Technotise graphic novel. The soundtrack music was composed by Boris Furduj and Slobodan Štrumberger, as well as the film trailer. The film is widely considered as the first animated featured film that was exclusively made in Serbia (Film Noir in 2007 was a joint Serbian and American animated featured film).

== Plot ==
The plot is set in 2074 (Note: Year 2074 is the 100th anniversary of director Aleksa Gajić's birth.) in Belgrade. The main character is Edit M. Stefanović, a female psychology student who, after failing the same university exam for the sixth time, decides to visit a dealer on the black market who installs a stolen military chip in her body that will record everything she sees to help pass the exam. Edit also has a job at a scientific and social research company, in taking care of Abel Mustafov, an autistic math genius who discovered a formula that connects all forces in the world, but no computer was able to calculate it fully without becoming self aware and shutting down immediately after that. After Edit sees the formula graph, the chip calculates the formula, able to "survive" thanks to its connection to Edit, develops a parallel personality and affords her abilities greater than she ever imagined. Alas, this is quickly overshadowed by the discovery that the chip is rapidly taking over her mind and body. She must race against time to save her humanity while simultaneously thwarting the nefarious parties desperate to retrieve the technology inside her.

== Voice cast ==
=== Main characters ===
- Sanda Knežević as Edit
- Nebojša Glogovac as Edi
- Jelisaveta Sabljić as Keva
- Petar Kralj as Deda
- Nikola Đuričko as Bojan
- Boris Milivojević as Jovan Vu
- Srđan Todorović as Herb
- Marija Karan as Broni
- Tatjana Đorđević as Sanja
- Vlasta Velisavljević as Professor Dorijević
- Srđan Miletić as Sergej
- Igor Bugarski as Abel

=== Supporting characters ===
- Moki as Moki
- Relja Pajić as Meda
- Marija Staničkov as Zeka
- Darko Grkinić as Guy at Herb's
- Zoran Kesić as Science Advisor
- Robert Perić as Doorman at Dejt Datu
- Modrag Zrnić Pike as Hoverdrom Worker 1
- Mladen Grbić as Hoverdrom Worker 2
- Mirko Lukić Pika as Faculty Guard
- Slobodan Štumberger as Faculty Security
- Dragan Škard as Department Store Security
- Milan Rusalić as Edit's Colleague
- Dragana Gajić as Doctor
- Marko Ristić as Ambulance Doctor 1 & 2
- Ivan Pejić as Policeman 1 & Bully
- Marko Banićević as Policeman 2
- Alem Bašić as Pedro in Latin Soap Opera
- Jelena Bošković as Marija in Latin Soap Opera
- Srđan Miletić as Street Roma
- Igor Bugarski as Village Peasant
- Jelena Janković as Speaker
- Ninoslav Filipović as Dispatcher

== Music ==
=== Main Soundtrack ===
Technotise: Edit & I Soundtrack

Soundtrack album by Boris Furduj and Slobodan Štrumberger
- Released: September 28, 2009
- Recorded: 2001–2009
- Studios: Studio S3P; Milan Prokop; Slobodan Štumberger
- Genre: Film soundtrack
- Length: 86:11
- Producer: PGP-RTS

Included as a special feature for the film's DVD release, it was later available to be downloaded free from the official film site. The link was functional until search engines stopped supporting Adobe Flash, making most of the links on the site unreachable even with Adobe Flash support extensions. There are currently no official methods to purchase or freely obtain the full soundtrack.

The number of tracks for the soundtrack vary. The soundtrack originally downloaded from the official film site had 22 tracks listed, with some tracks omitted from the download link (specifically tracks High Dub, Jazzy Flow, Righteous Soldier short version, and Technotise), despite being credited in the film or were made during the film's development. The soundtrack on SoundCloud and Discogs would have 19 tracks listed, omitting additional tracks from the official film site one (specifically tracks Stvar Je Odluke, Stop on The Edge, and F.L.O.P.). The current list of 26 tracks includes all the songs that were present in the official film site download link, music video track variations, and songs listed in the film's credits.

Three music videos were done for the release of the film and soundtrack, Stvar Je Odluke by Mini Morisi, Main Theme by Prototip featuring Žika Todorović, and Righteous Soldier (short version) by Maki Man & Rella.

The track Technotise by Prototip was originally a single made in 2001 for the Technotise comic book. A music video appeared in the film's Making Of documentary as part of the DVD's special features.

All music is composed by Boris Furduj and Slobodan Štrumberger. Track Stvar je Odluke was performed by Mini Morisi, text by Milica Radosavljević, music by Željko Markuš, and produced by Gvozden i Mrle. Track Stop On The Edge (called Death Rider in the credits) was performed by Rapid Force and produced by N. Bojković and K. Bogdanović. Track F.L.O.P. and High Dub were performed by Black Ark Crew and produced by MightyWoo & Co. Tracks "Righteous Soldier" (short and long versions) were done by DŽKŠN-FKŠN, text by Marko Baničević, music by Maki Man & Rella, and produced by Slobodan Štrumberger. Tracks "Main Theme" (including RMX) Runnin, Vision (guest artist MC Minja MISTAKE MISTAKE), Jazzy Flow (guest artist Vesna Maksic), and Technotise were performed by Prototip and produced by Boris Furduj and Slobodan Štrumberger. Other credited musicians are Mihailo Rakić, Vladimir Štrumberger, Relja Pajić, and Mirko Reljanović.

No.	Title	Artist	Length
1.	"Main Theme"	Prototip	3:19
2.	"Groblje / Graveyard"		1:37
3.	"San / Dream"		1:31
4.	"Formula"		3:17
5.	"Stvar Je Odluke"	Mini Morisi	2:50
6.	"Stop on The Edge"	RAPID FORCE	3:04
7.	"Runnin'"	Prototip	6:08
8.	"F.L.O.P."	Black Ark Crew	5:13
9.	"High Dub"	Black Ark Crew	4:23
10.	"Jazzy Flow"	Prototip & Vesna Maksic	5:29
11.	"Liquid Sound"		4:55
12.	"Fajt Na Faxu / Fight At The Faculty"		4:25
13.	"Pregled / Examination"		1:37
14.	"Pregled / Examination (Long)"		3:10
15.	"San+Groblje / Dream+Graveyard"		3:01
16.	"Righteous Soldier"	Maki Man & Rella	3:23
17.	"Righteous Soldier (Long)"	Maki Man & Rella	5:19
18.	"Vision"	Prototip & MC Minja MISTAKE MISTAKE	3:47
19.	"Sergejeva Smrt / Sergej's Death"		3:36
20.	"Spašavanje Edit / Saving Edit (Long)"		3:19
21.	"Edit Umire / Edit Dying"		4:02
22.	"Spašavanje Edit / Saving Edit"		2:33
23.	"Edit Raj / Edit Heaven"		4:00
24.	"Odjava / Logout"		3:11
25.	"Main theme (RMX)"	Prototip	5:50
26.	"Technotise"	Prototip	5:05
Total length:			86:11

=== Prototip Soundtrack ===
Prototip - Flyer

Soundtrack album by Boris Furduj, Slobodan Štrumberger, and Prototip
- Released: 2005
- Recorded: 2003–2005
- Studios: Studio S3P; Milan Prokop; Slobodan Štumberger
- Genre: Film soundtrack
- Length: 41:55
- Producer: PGP-RTS

Uploaded on SoundCloud in 2016 by Slobodan Štrumberger, the Prototip - Flyer was originally made in 2005 and contains several tracks (specifically tracks Jazzy Flow, Vision, and Runnin') that would appear in the final film soundtrack. The track OPPM was originally a single made in 2003. The cover for the album shows Edit on it.

All music is composed by Slobodan Štrumberger and Prototip. Authors and special guests on the album are Nancy for the track Flyer, MC Minja MISTAKE MISTAKE for the track Vision, Vesna Maksic for the tracks Jazzy Flow and Flyer.

No.	Title	Artist	Length
1.	"OPPM"		4:08
2.	"Voyage"		4:27
3.	"Flyer"	Nancy & Vesna Maksic	3:27
4.	"Jazzy Flow"	Vesna Maksic	5:29
5.	"Vision"	MC Minja MISTAKE MISTAKE	3:47
6.	"African Brand Pit"		3:25
7.	"Problem"		5:19
8.	"Runnin'"		6:08
9.	"A Place Called Home (PJ Harvey RMX)"		5:41
Total length:			41:55

== Production ==
=== Development ===
The idea came when Aleksa Gajić, film director and comic book author, did an illustration for a story the buildings in Knez Mihajlova Street for Politikin Zabavnik. Then his illustration appeared on the front page of the magazine.

In 1996, Aleksa Gajić worked on his graphic novel Technotise for his thesis at the Faculty of Applied Arts in Belgrade, In 1998 he would revise his original comic and it would be published in 2001.

Unlike in the comic book, the film insists that the characters are more lively, because they are anti-heroes who change depending on the situation that forces them to do things they wouldn't normally do.

The director stated:"That mostly refers to the female protagonist of Edit. [...] I insisted in the use of slang and mild social aesthetics in the dialogue, which makes this film seem like a classic local film. And that made it even more of a turning point in the story, when it stops being a tragic comedy and becomes fiction. Gajić was also criticized for the heavy use of street slang in the film."

Drawing, shooting and post-production took three years, and the budget, with the sponsorship and support of the Serbian Ministry of Culture and the Culture Secretariat of the City of Belgrade, reached 75 million Serbian dinars. The sponsor of the film was also Erste Bank, which bank signs can be seen in multiple shots throughout the film.

=== Animation ===
In technical terms, the film is combination of four kinds of animations:

- Vector animation was used for fractal animation (opening of the mouth, moving the eyes, nose, and ears),
- 3D animation was used for most of the action scenes, objects, environments, or scenes showcasing high tech machines; 3D animation was done by Igor Dragišić, Nebojša Andrić, Aleksandar Novrta, Slobodan Kovačević, Antoan Simić, and Ivan Pejčić,
- 2D animation was mostly used for characters in the style of Japanese anime; 2D animation was done by Milisav Banković, Darko Grkinić, and Relja Pajić-

Large parts of the film work were done using Moho.

== Release ==
=== Theatrical ===
The premiere of the film took place on 28 September 2009, at the Grand Hall of the Sava Centar, [8] but was planned for November, 2008.

The distribution house is Cinears, and the film has been shown in cinemas since 1 October 2009.

=== Marketing ===
Technotise was featured at 2009 Exit music festival and Cinema City film festival in Novi Sad, the 2009 Festival of Animated Film in Banja Luka, Bosnia and Herzegovina, the 2009 Festival of Animated Cinema in Waterloo, Ontario, Canada, and at the 2010 Sci-Fi-London Oktoberfest in London, United Kingdom.

A commercial was produced for Exit, featuring shots of Novi Sad and the Petrovaradin Fortress in the film's art style with futuristic elements added to the cities landmarks. Posters for the film's feature at the music festival were also created.

A short logo promo for MTV (both with Serbian and English text) was done to promote the release of the film.

A short advertisement was done for Green Guerilla promoting ecologically friendly bags, in collaboration with Exit music Festival, "Očistimo Srbiju", and B92.

=== Home media ===
Technotise: Edit & I was released on DVD and Blu-ray with English subtitles, including Serbian and German dubs. The DVD special features also include a documentary on the making the film, as well as videos and soundtrack done by Boris Furduj and Slobodan Štrumberger. The documentary was split into four parts and uploaded on the official Technotise YouTube page.

The Art of Technotise: Edit i Ja artbook, reissue of the Technotise comic book, and a model figure of Edit were available for purchase from the official site (as well as the DVD and German Blu-ray) during the initial release of the film in limited quantities.

Currently the entire film is available to watch on YouTube.

== Reception ==
In Serbian cinemas, the film was in fourth place after the films 2012, Wait for Me and I Will Not Come, and Here and There. In eight weeks of screenings, 16,339 viewers saw it.

=== Critical response ===
On Sajt nadlanu.comit is stated: "Everything that can be seen in this film is purely artistic work, especially Gajić's vision of Belgrade and all its characteristic scenes. The most wonderful thing of all is that it is not our city from boring postcards, but rather the corners, facades and asphalt, which are the right way to showcase Belgrade. This animated film may be the best virtual guide ever made through Belgrade."

Web magazine Popboks believes director Aleksa Gajić has lost the battle in the field of language vocabulary because the film is dominated by vulgar words, which in a bad way creates an experience of the city's milieu.

The director stated: "I noticed that readers are responding positively towards the visuals of the Belgrade buildings to which various futuristic architectural elements have been added. This recognition gave readers an impression of believability and a feeling that such a thing could indeed be seen on the streets of Belgrade in the future. This is an effect I would like to achieve in this film."

=== Accolades ===
At the 2009 Cinema City film festival in Novi Sad, the film received special recognition from the audience for best film, while director Gajić received recognition for his special contribution to the development of Serbian cinema.

The Beta News Agency listed the film Technotise: Edit & and I as the most important cultural and entertainment events in 2009.

At the 2010 Ljubljana International Film Festival in Slovenia, the film received a special recognition from the audience for best featured film. At the 2010 Fantasia International Film Festival in Montreal, Canada, it received the audience silver award. At the 2010 Science+Fiction Festival in Trieste, Italy, it received a special Jury award.

The film was also nominated at the CICAF "Golden Monkey King Awards" competition.

== Future ==
On 25 September 2009, Director Aleksa Gajić stated that he has prepared a script for the sequel. The follow-up takes place in Kotor, and the main character is a journalist from Belgrade. Since 2015, Gajić has been working on his second featured animated film Technotise: Prophet 1.0 (Serbian: Пророк 1.0, Prorok 1.0). The sequel is done by the same crew that worked on the original.

Gajić stated: "Since 2015, I've been trying to finish this film with the producers [...] I'm sure we'll get a resolution this year. I hope that the Serbian Film Center will help me to finish the film. There is always a chance that the producers of this film will return the money back to the FCS that was intended for this film. It would be good if the FCS money would be forwarded to me so that I would eventually finish that film."

== See also ==
- Technotise
