= Hans Ola Urstad =

Norwegian diplomat

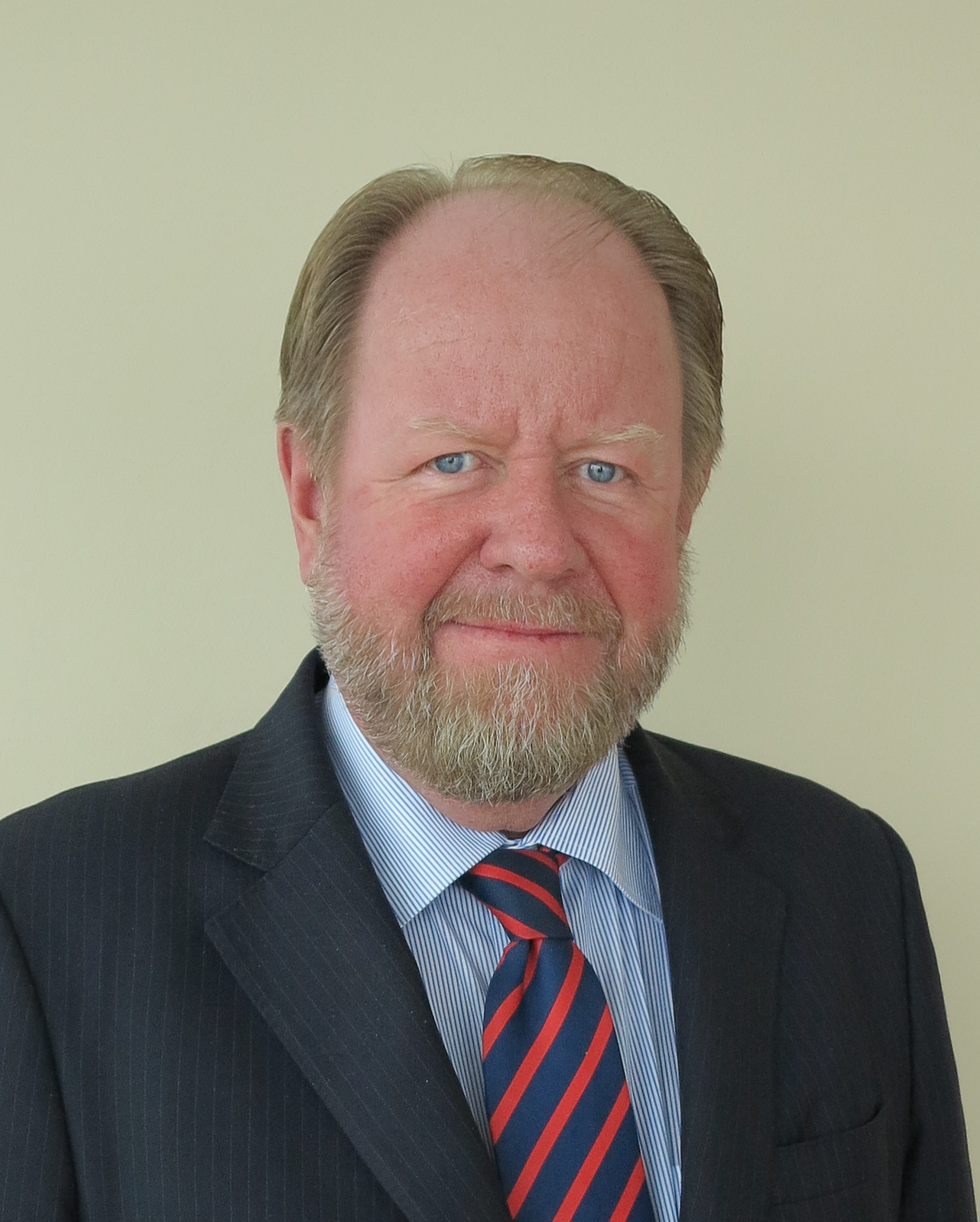
Norwegian Ambassador to Malaysia, H.E. Hans Ola Urstad

Hans Ola Urstad (born 11 April 1951) was a Norwegian diplomat.

He was born at Hidra, Vest-Agder, took the cand.polit. degree and started working for the Norwegian Ministry of Foreign Affairs in 1980. He served at the Norwegian Embassy in Warsaw, Poland from 1982 to 85, then at the Norwegian Delegation to NATO, Brussels, from 1985 to 88. In 1989 he became Head of Personnel in the Ministry of Foreign Affairs. In 1990 he was appointed Chief of Staff of the Parliament's Committee on Foreign Affairs and Constitutional matters as well as Director of the Parliament's International Department. From 1991 to 1995 he was Norwegian Consul General in San Francisco, covering the 12 westernmost states of the US. From 2000 to 2001 he was Special Adviser in the Ministry of Foreign Affairs, before serving as Norway's Ambassador to Serbia and Montenegro from 2001 to 2005. From 2006 to 2009 he was Ambassador/Head of Mission of the OSCE Mission to Serbia. From 2009 until 2012 he served at the Ministry in Oslo as Senior Adviser. He served as Norway's ambassador to Malaysia from 2012 to 2017, then from 2017 to 2018 he was engaged at the Norwegian Embassy in Manila, The Philippines. He is now retired.
