= Technotise =

Comic book by Darko Grkinić

- The cover of 2009 Technotise release

Publication information
- Publisher: System Comics
- Genre: Science fiction
- Publication date: 2001

Creative team
- Written by: Darko Grkinić
- Artist: Aleksa Gajić

Technotise is a Serbian science fiction comic album created by artist Aleksa Gajić and writer Darko Grkinić. The comic was adapted into animated feature film Technotise: Edit & I.

== Creation and publication ==
Technotise was originally created in 1998 by artist Aleksa Gajić and writer Darko Grkinić, as Gajić's thesis on the Faculty of Applied Arts, University of Arts in Belgrade. The story is set in the year 2074. Gajić stated that he chose that particular year because in 2074 he would be 100 years old.

Technotise was originally published as a comic album in 2001 by Serbian publisher System Comics. The album was promoted with an animated music video created by Gajić. The electronic music track, entitled "Bombona?" ("Candy?"), was composed by Gajić himself. In 2009, System Comics reissued Technotise, the reissue featuring four bonus pages with the story of how Edit and her boyfriend Bojan met and several pages with Gajić's drawings and concept art.

== Plot ==
The story is set in 2074 Belgrade. The main character is Edit, an art student. She and her friends discover a legendary tunnel connecting Zemun and Kalemegdan, made during Ottoman–Habsburg wars.

== Animated film ==
In 2009, the comic book was adapted into an animated feature film Technotise: Edit & I. Although based on the comic book, the film features a different plot. In the film, Edit is a psychology student who, after failing the same university exam for the sixth time, decides to visit a dealer on the black market who installs a stolen military chip in her body that will record everything she sees to help pass the exam. The chip develops a parallel personality and affords Edit abilities greater than she ever imagined.
