= Srđan Ćuković =

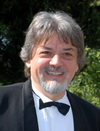

Background information
- Also known as: солиста
- Born: 31 March 1952; Belgrade, Serbia
- Genres: Pop; blues
- Occupation(s): Poet, composer and songwriter
- Years active: 1970–present
- Labels: City Records

Srđan Ćuković (born 31 March 1952) is a Serbian poet and composer.

== Early days ==
Ćuković was born to a Serbian father, university professor Dr. Milan Ćuković, and to Branislava Ćuković. His grandfather's surname was Ćuk, but in 1922 the grandfather changed it to Ćuković.

He was introduced to accordion after injuring his arm in a car accident at age eight. His unwillingness to learn notes led his music teacher to suggest guitar to his parents. He got his first guitar in 1962, when his father bought him his first Beatles single. He was beginning to write poetry and learn English, mostly to sing songs by favorites such as the Beatles, the Hollies, Bob Dylan, Donovan, the Kinks, the Rolling Stones, and the Beach Boys. He often jokes saying that he learned English by listening to the Beatles and Radio Luxembourg.

As a secondary school student he was introduced to journalist, chess grandmaster and radio DJ Nikola Karaklajić, who sought out young musicians and had good knowledge of English and access to many recordings.

Ćuković started as a songwriter and performer for the play The Punks, performed by the Dadov Youth Theatre from Belgrade, directed by Radomir Putnik and managed by Mihailo Tošić. His original score for the play won him his first award at the Youth Theatre festival in Kula in 1970.

== Career ==
Ćuković enrolled at the University of Belgrade Faculty of Law, graduating in 1976 to begin working for the largest Yugoslav trading company of that time – Generalexport / Genex. He was appointed as representative to the office in Sweden from 1984 to 1989.

In Sweden he spent much of his free time writing poetry and composing music.

=== Studio and festivals ===
In 1986 Ćuković met two musicians from Yugoslavia: pianist and music producer Bratislav Bata Amvon and guitarist and music producer Tinnie Varga. In his apartment Ćuković built a four-channel recording studio. The three recorded Ćuković songs as demo takes. Ćuković returned to Belgrade and invested his savings into a studio he named "Triler", working with musician and producer Dragomir Miki Stanojević and Branislav Bane Bojadžievski. The studio operated from 1990 until 1997. He wrote songs and recorded them with many singers. He attended competitive festivals including "Beogradsko proleće", Mesam, Yugovizija (Eurovision Song Contest preliminary), Manager and Budva, sometimes winning. Singers such as Miša Ždrnja, Sunčica Knežević and Igor Pervić started their singing careers singing Ćuković songs. Bands including Spomenari and Maja Pop-Top also used his material. Bulgarian singer Violeta Vili Rai represented television Priština on last Yugovizija with Ćuković's song and made an LP material with Ćuković's songs. Svetlana Ceca Slavković was a singer who was discovered by Ćuković. Together they won a couple of festival first prizes.

=== "A Poem About Father" ===
In spring 1995, Ćuković wrote a song that somehow ended his public career. At the Manager 1995 festival, Ćuković asked actors Suzana Petričević and Marko Nikolić to perform and wrote an anti-war song for them implicating Yugoslavia's late president Josip Broz Tito and the war under the regime of Slobodan Milošević, ending with "Pardon us God". The song, titled "A Poem About Father", was the winner in the Sava Center contest. The political regime in Serbia objected to the song. The song was never recorded and all known copies were destroyed. The only surviving copy was one that was recorded on a home VCR. Ćuković was silenced for many years afterwards.

Serbian blues rock band Zona B recorded a song devoted to Serbian tennis player Novak Djokovic called "Joker" for which Ćuković wrote English lyrics. Guitarist Dušan "Duda" Bezuha arranged and produced many Ćuković songs, with Ćuković singing. In 2013 he finalized more than twenty new songs; arranged and produced by Bratislav Bata Amvon or Bezuha.

=== Author and poet ===
In 2004 Cuković released a book of poetry, In Pursuit for Colorful Galaxy("Tražeći šarenu galaksiju"), marketed with a CD containing most of his famous songs from that time. One of the songs was "A Poem About Father" that Ćuković's friend, guitar player and producer Duda Bezuha mastered from an old VHS tape. Belgrade singer Ana Djordjević recorded one of Ćuković's early songs and made a promo video both in Serbian and English (Ćuković wrote lyrics for the English version too) with a new arrangement by Bezuha.

In 2013 his second book of poetry and essays, Dreams to Take Away (Snovi za poneti), was published. His poem "Embrace Life" ("Zagrli zivot") was included in the International Anthology of Poetry for Children published by the Association of Balkan Writers in 2014. He is mentioned in the monograph "Spirit of Dadov" ("Duh Dadova"), published by Youth Theatre Dadov. His third book of essays and poetry Amo, Ergo Sum was published in 2016. His fourth book of essays and poetry Život je pustolovina ograničenog trajanja (Life Is an Adventure of Limited Duration) was published in mid-2022 (under number 978-86-917221-2-8 (National Library of Serbia)) and many of the lyrics from it are on YouTube as composed and finished songs. His fifth book of poetry and esseys called "Život" ("Life") was published mid-2025, (under number 978-86-917221-3-5(National Library of Serbia)). And he continue creating.

== Style and influence ==
Ćuković composes pop, blues, protest and folk-like songs. His singing is influenced by Leonard Cohen.

== Affiliations ==
Ćuković is a member of the writers' society Miloš Crnjanski in Stockholm. He became a member of the Serbian Association of Composers (SOKOJ) in 1993. Ćuković joined The Association of Serbian Writers in 2014. Ćuković has been a member of Association of Translators of Serbia since 1976.

== Personal life ==
Ćuković lives in Belgrade with his third wife Sonja Antić. Ćuković was married to his second wife Mirjana Karić. He has a daughter Iva from his first marriage with Dragoslava Vasić.

== Discography ==
- Uz tvoju mamu – Maja Pop-Top (takođe otpevala Olgica Lola Amvon)
- Pružam ti cvet – Maja Pop-Top
- Najlepši je taj trenutak – Maja Pop-Top
- Putnik – Maja Pop-Top
- Bio si sve – Violeta i Triler
- Ljubomora – Violeta i Triler
- Kažeš da me voliš – Violeta i Triler (takođe otpevala Vesna Vukelić Vendy)
- Lud za tvojim osmehom – Igor Pervić
- Da li sanjaš – Miša Ždrnja
- Aligator – Sunćica Knežević
- Boja reke – Spomenari
- Dunave moj – Spomenari
- Pesma o ocu – Suzana Petričević i Marko Nikolić
- Sa dna – Svetlana Ceca Slavković
- Blue song – Svetlana Ceca Slavković
- Polako – Svetlana Ceca Slavković
- Plave farmerke – Svetlana Ceca Slavković
- Priznajem ti – Olgica Lola Amvon
- Ja radim a nemam – Srđan Ćuković
- Gomila laži – Srđan Ćuković
- Otišla si juče-luče – Srđan Ćuković
- Čuj mala – Srđan Ćuković
- Ljubavna pesma – Srđan Ćuković
- Opraštam ti – Srđan Ćuković
- Tvoja malena ruka – Srđan Ćuković
- Jutro – Srđan Ćuković
- Sometimes – Srđan Ćuković
- Snovi i sećanja – Srđan Ćuković
- Pobegni do mene – Srđan Ćuković
- Moj blues i ja – Srđan Ćuković
- Oproštaj – Srđan Ćuković
- Auto – Srđan Ćuković
- Moj Beograd – Srđan Ćuković
- Naš Tango – Srđan Ćuković
- Subotom dok... – Srđan Ćuković
- Dok budiš se – Srđan Ćuković
- Grožđe zri – Srđan Ćuković
- Poskupeće; oće-neće – Srđan Ćuković
- Nemoj da zoveš – Srđan Ćuković
- Nov dan – Srđan Ćuković
- Odlazi, ostavlja me – Srđan Ćuković
- Pomozi doktore – Srđan Ćuković
- Usne tvoje – Srđan Ćuković
- Ljuljaj – Srđan Ćuković
- Nosila je kratko – Srđan Ćuković
- Da li bi htela – Srđan Ćuković
- Sećam se Rep – Srđan Ćuković
- Udarnička – Srđan Ćuković
- Tatina ćerka – Srđan Ćuković
- Uporno se trudim – Srđan Ćuković
- Tebi – Srđan Ćuković
- Subota – Srđan Ćuković
- Slika iz albuma – Srđan Ćuković
- Ritam koraka – Srđan Ćuković
- Prvi put – Srđan Ćuković
- Protest 2005. – Srđan Ćuković
- Pesma za miran san – Srđan Ćuković
- Pesma o zvezdi – Srđan Ćuković
- Noć (Mirina pesma) – Srđan Ćuković
- Nije bilo prekasno – Srđan Ćuković
- Mnogo reči – Srđan Ćuković
- Mirjana – Srđan Ćuković
- Jorgovan – Srđan Ćuković
- Gde je ljubav – Srđan Ćuković
- Budim se – Srđan Ćuković
- Ako dođe taj dan – Srđan Ćuković
- Tople kiše – Srđan Ćuković
- Sećam se – Srđan Ćuković
- Budi opet tu/Dolina suza – Srđan Ćuković
- Budalasti country – Srđan Ćuković
- Sav moj svet – Srđan Ćuković
- Ti si moja muzika – Srđan Ćuković
- Imaš problem u glavi – Srđan Ćuković
- Pismo sinu – Srđan Ćuković
- Slučajni susret – Srđan Ćuković
- Daj mi svoju reč – Srđan Ćuković
- Gospodin iz mog komšiluka – Srđan Ćuković
- Oblak – Srđan Ćuković
- Pesma – Srđan Ćuković
- Ostani tu – Srđan Ćuković
- Stokholmski dani – Srđan Ćuković
- Da imam tatu tajkuna – Srđan Ćuković
- Komšija – Srđan Ćuković
- Ljubav, ljubav – Srđan Ćuković
- Prvi dan poznanstva – Srđan Ćuković
- Sa društvene mreže – Srđan Ćuković
- Fali mi – Srđan Ćuković
- Ljubav tvoja – Srđan Ćuković
- Prolazi sve – Srđan Ćuković
- Reka – Srđan Ćuković
- Zašto ne umeš da crtaš – Srđan Ćuković
- U noćima bez sna – Srđan Ćuković
- Još jedan usran dan – Srđan Ćuković
- Kako uspevam – Srđan Ćuković
- Zagrli me – Srđan Ćuković
- Idila - Srđan Ćuković
- Panta rei - Srđan Ćuković
- Rore, Rore - Srđan Ćuković
- Ono što znam (na prvu godišnjicu) - Srđan Ćuković
- Kakav dan, kakav dan - Srđan Ćuković
- Da si rekla ne - Srđan Ćuković
- Dal' sanjam - Srđan Ćuković
- Ciklus života - Srđan Ćuković
- Da sam sunčev zrak - Srđan Ćuković
- Bajka - Srđan Ćuković
- Dok je ona spavala - Srđan Ćuković
- Dečački san - Srđan Ćuković
- Dal' život zna - Srđan Ćuković
- Znači mi - Srđan Ćuković
- Život tvoj - Srđan Ćuković
- Zaspala je na mom ramenu - Srđan Ćuković
- Uspavanka (za decu od 7 do 77 godina) - Srđan Ćuković
- Uglavnom - Srđan Ćuković
- U sred sna i jave - Srđan Ćuković
- Telemarketing - Srđan Ćuković
- Šta bi bilo - Srđan Ćuković
- Srećna Nova godina - Srđan Ćuković
- Sreća -Srđan Ćuković
- Specijalni dvogledi - Srđan Ćuković
- Sonjina pesma - Srđan Ćuković
- Sa Himalaja - Srđan Ćuković
- Razmišlja o njoj - Srđan Ćuković
- Plastika - Srđan Ćuković
- Pesma - Srđan Ćuković
- Osećam potrebu - Srđan Ćuković
- Onima koji odoše - Srđan Ćuković
- Nešto - Srđan Ćuković
- Neke čudne boje - Srđan Ćuković
- Nekad, sad i ko zna kad - Srđan Ćuković
- Naš stan - Amvon family
- Mr. Blues - Srđan Ćuković
- Moja uspavana strašila - Srđan Ćuković
- Miris kiše - Srđan Ćuković
- Majmuni više mare kad se pare - Srđan Ćuković
- Lova - Srđan Ćuković
- Laku noć blues - Srđan Ćuković
- Kiselo grožđe - Srđan Ćuković
- Kao - Srđan Ćuković
- Kad volim da klopam - Srđan Ćuković
- Još jedna pesma o ljubavi - Srđan Ćuković
- Jutarnja - Srđan Ćuković
- Još jedan je dan nasmejan - Srđan Ćuković
- Fioke - Srđan Ćuković
- Hodam i gledam - Srđan Ćuković
- Idila - Srđan Ćuković
- Veseli, pokisli blues - Srđan Ćuković
- Voleo bih da sam supermen - Srđan Ćuković
- Baladera - Srđan Ćuković
- Čaj u januaru - Srđan Ćuković
- Postoji spas za nas - Srđan Ćuković
- NOVA LJUBAV RAĐA SE
- VESELI, POKISLI BLUES
- BALADERA
- NAČISTO SE RASPILAVIM
- UŽIVAM
- SEĆANJE NA ZIMU
- TUGA
- KADA VOLIM JA
- REĆI ĆU TI DA ZNAŠ
- HVALA MAMA
- GODINE SE MNOŽE
- LEPOTA
- UMESTO LAMENTA
- KOMPLIMENTI ŠEFU KUHINJE
- ULICA TIŠINE
- RAZUMEM, AL' NE RAZUMEM
- ODAKLE TA SNAGA I MOĆ
- PUSTI DA ODE REKA SUZA
- SEDIM SAM POD TREMOM
- 72
- PROLEĆE
- NEDAM SVOJU PUŠKU
- OAZA
- UN'ALTRA CANZONE DI LUNA
- KOČIJA NA PUTU ZA RAJ
- NESANICA
- LEPOTICA SPAVA PORED MENE
- ŠARENE BOJE
- PESMA MATOROG DEČAKA
- LETNJA LAGANICA
- PORUKA STRANCIMA U MENI
- NIJE BLAM MI
- BAŠ SU TUŽNI STARI ALBUMI
- LJUBAV JE, LJUBAV JE LJUBAVI
- PONOĆNA
- IGRAJ I PEVAJ AMIGO
- SMEM LI DA TI VERUJEM
- SERENADA ZA DAN
- PRIČA O ZVEZDI
- SRCE
- VOĆNA SALATA
- ALABASTER
- ESTRADAJKA
- BROŠ
- LETNJA PESMA
- ZVEZDA LJUBAVI
- PESMA ZA DRUŠTVO IZ ĆOŠKA
- NAŠE KUCE
- BALADA O GLUMCU
- MILE TIGAR SA PLANINE SREĆA
- NOSITE NEPROBOJNE GAĆE
- IZVINI
- SMEJ SE
- SAMO SE SKINI
- GOST IZ SNA
- REČ PO REČ
- KIŠE
- KAKO PREPOZNATI
- BIBLIOTEKA
- DOLAZI NAM DRUŠTVO
- DVA, TRI KAMENA
- RAZMISLI
- DEČAK U MENI
- ŽALOPOJKA
- PENZIONERSKI BLUES
- PESMA LJUBAVI
- FILM BEZ FILMA
- NE VOLIM
- ŽIVOTINJSKI DIPLOMATSKI KOR-HOR
- ČAK I NADA UMIRE
- SUZA
- SLUČAJNO
- MOJI DUHOVI
- PRODAVAC KOZMETIKE
- KOLIKO SMO SE VOLELI
- KRAJ
- PRVI PROLEĆNI VALS
- DOBRO JUTRO
- KUCNUO JE ČAS
- PUT MOJIH SNOVA
- ŠUMOVI U GLAVI
- BOGAT ČOVEK
- IDEMO NA SLAVU
- ZA ONE KOJI SE VOLE
- PENZIONERSKI LAMENT
- MOJ FERARI
- OKEAN ZVANI SUDBINA
- ELIKSIR SREĆE
- KAO JUČE
- DILEMA JE REŠENA
- DRUGI OTAC MOJ
- JOŠ JEDNA POBEDA LENJE PITE
- NOVA GODINA
- MOST
- NAŠ JEDINAC KREĆE U PEČALBU
- BOŽIĆNA
- SJAJ I BEDA VELEGRADA
- RIZIK I RAZUM
- USPOMENE
- PREVARE, LAGANJE, SVAĐE
- REKLA – KAZALA
- MALENA
- TAKNUTO – MAKNUTO
- ARIJA ZA IZBEGAVANJE
- NAŠA STARA ZGRADA
- JOŠ SI TU
- UTOPIJA
- BIO JE
- DAJ ŠTA DAŠ
- SREĆA SE NE KUPUJE
- BALERINA
- KAD KAŽEM - TI
- TRENUTAK
- LASTE DOLEĆU
- NEMOJ DA ZOVEŠ
- NOV DAN
- SNOVI I SEĆANJA
- ZOVE SE LJUBAV
- GOMILA LAŽI
- OTIŠLA SI JUČE
- KAKO USPEVAM
- CHANEL 5
- DREAM SONG
- FOR ONCE
- GOT YOU MY BABY
- I WISH
- LUDILO
- THE MARCH OF LOVE
- POČINJE NOVI DAN
- USPAVANKA
- CIKLUS ŽIVOTA
- LAKU NOĆ BLUES
- JOŠ JEDAN JE DAN NASMEJAN

== Sources ==
- Srđan Ćuković na Discogs
- Biografija Cece Slavković
- Izdavačka kuća City Records
- Sokoj – lista autora sa pravima
- Zona B oficijelni sajt
