= Mladen Kalpic =

Serbian journalist, lecturer, filmmaker, artist

- Born: 21 June 1977 (age 48); Belgrade (Serbia) Yugoslavia
- Education: B.Sci., M.Sci., Ph.D
- Occupations: journalist, lecturer, filmmaker, artist
- Known for: lectures on subjects related to pop culture, reports for Serbian National TV RTS1
- Notable work: three short films, at the New Light Festival of Digital Film (2007)

Mladen Kalpic (born 21 June 1977) is a journalist, lecturer, filmmaker and artist in Serbia.

== Background ==
Kalpic was born on 21 June 1977, in Belgrade in what is now Serbia. He has a B.Sci. in Philosophy, a M.Sci. in Film and Media Studies, and a PhD in Political Science. He is known to the Serbian public for his lectures on subjects related to pop culture, reports for Serbian National TV RTS1, and several magazine and newspaper articles. In 2016, his texts for the weekly magazine Vreme were nominated for the prestigious journalist award Đoka Vještica.

Kalpic exhibited his first painting at the age of five. His first solo exhibition, "I Got To See," was held on 19 September 2006, and his paintings were also on display at the Saatchi Gallery web site. From October to December 2016 Muzej Jugoslovenske Kinoteke (Yugoslav Film Archive) held an exhibition of his comic-strip "Our Fatherland Foreign Film Brand" along with his choice of foreign films about Serbia and Yugoslavia: Cat People, Force 10 from Navarone, Gus, Andy Warhol's Frankenstein, The Captive, and many other films rarely seen in Serbia, under the banner Otadžbina Naša Iz Ugla Stranih Filmaša (Our Fatherland From the Perspective of the Filmmaker).

His three short films were successfully presented at the New Light Festival of Digital Film from 13 to 15 September 2007. In 2007, he completed his master's thesis "Aesthetical And Media Analyze of Star Wars Serial," portions of which were published in the magazine Gradina (Number 19) and on Belgrade Book Faire 2016 presented Znak Sagite (Number 22) where he was interviewed and showed original story boards from the artists. David Russell also published a heavily edited version on the website Kaleidoskop.

In 2007 his experimental band "The Force" was acclaimed fifth best new band of 2007 by the jury of the Popboks. On 18 September 2007, parts of his doctoral thesis "Aesthetical And Media Analyze of Music Video Clips" were published in the scientific publication "Sveske" (Number 96) in June 2010.
