= Aleksa Gajić =

Serbian comics artist and film director

Aleksa Gajić Алекса Гајић
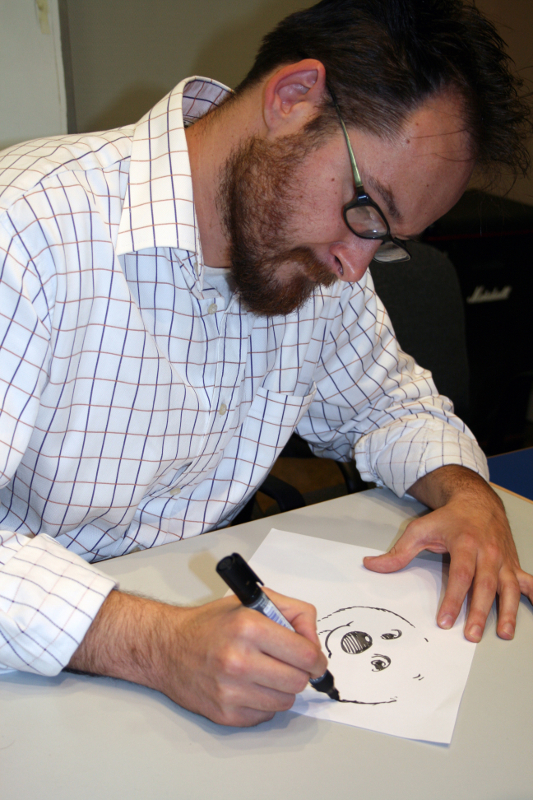
- Born: May 20, 1974 (age 52) Belgrade, SFR Yugoslavia
- Areas: Penciller, Inker, Colorist
- Notable works: Scourge of the Gods (sr.Bič Božji), Technotise

Aleksa Gajić (Serbian Cyrillic: Алекса Гајић, born May 20, 1974, Belgrade) is a Serbian comics artist and film director.

== Career ==
Gajić is best known as the illustrator of Scourge of the Gods (fr. Le Fléau des dieux), written by Valérie Mangin, and Technotise, written by Darko Grkinić. Also, he is a well-known illustrator in Serbia, and has published in various magazines, such as Politikin Zabavnik.

From 2000 he is under contract with French comic book publisher Soleil Productions. He is the main author of the animated feature film Technotise: Edit & I released in 2009.

== Selected bibliography ==
=== Comicography ===
- Technotise, writer: Darko Grkinić, "System Comics", Belgrade, Serbia, 2001 and 2009. ISBN 86-902255-1-X.
- In the screws: a collection of short comics (U šrafovima: kolekcija kratkih stripova), "System Comics", Belgrade, 2003. ISBN 86-84687-02-7.
- Le Fléau des dieux 1–6, writer: Valérie Mangin, "Soleil Productions", Toulon, France, 2000–2006.
  - Bič Božji 1–6, "System Comics", Belgrade, Serbia, 2002–2005.
  - Scourge of the Gods 1–2, "Marvel", New York, 2009–2010.
- Drakko 1–2, writer: Valérie Mangin, "Soleil Productions", Toulon, 2011–2012.

=== Art books and catalogs ===
- Aleksa Gajić: virtual reality – real virtuality / Aleksa Gajić: virtuelna realnost – realna virtuelnost (exhibition catalog), Museum of Applied Arts, June 9–30, 2005. Text by Anica Tucakov, exhibition curator Marijana Petrović-Raić, 2005, 44 p. ISBN 86-7415-094-2.
- Epic heroes and city of the future (Epski heroji i grad budućnosti / Aleksa Gajić : héros epiqués et ville du futur), "Fabrika" (exhibition catalog), Novi Sad, September 7–8, 2012, editor Zdravko Vulin, Student Cultural Center, Novi Sad, and the French Institute, Belgrade, 2012, 32 p.
- ScrapBook (Skrepbuk), "Moro" and "System Comics", Belgrade, 2012.
