= Novica Antić =

Serbian activist

- Новица Антић
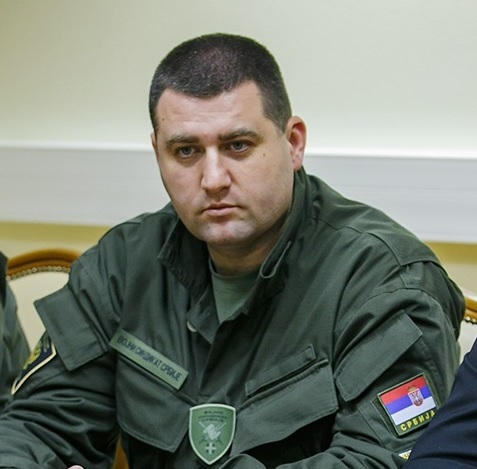
- N Antic 2019

Personal details
- Born: 27.2.1978 Belgrade, SR Serbia, SFR Yugoslavia
- Profession: Military Explosives and Engineering, Criminal Forensics, Military Police, Lawyer

Novica Antić (Serbian Cyrillic: Новица Антић; 27 February 1978) is a trade union official and political activist in Serbia. He was the president of the Military Trade Union of Serbia (Vojnog sindikata Srbije, VSS) from 2014 to 2024.

== Early life and career ==
Antić was born to a military family in Belgrade, in what was then the Socialist Republic of Serbia in the Socialist Federal Republic of Yugoslavia. He completed military school in the Yugoslav Army's Department of Engineering as the first in his class in 1999, at which time he entered the professional military service. He trained professionally in military police units, where he worked on crime suppression and criminal forensics beginning in 2000. Antić has also received the title of graduated lawyer from the Faculty of Business Studies and Law in Belgrade. He now lives in Kragujevac.

== Union official ==
Antić became president of the VSS in November 2016, he organized a public protest that displayed photographs of Serbian soldiers and police officials who were forced in work in poor conditions with malfunctioning equipment. The protest was supported by the Police Union of Serbia, the Association of Trade Unions of Military Pensioners, and many citizens. The following year, he protested that the Chief of the General Staff of the Serbian Army had been informed that members of an organized crime group were using a shooting range at a military barracks but that the General Staff had not taken any action to sanction those responsible.

A military-disciplinary procedure was subsequently initiated against Antić, who was charged with violating political neutrality and participating in illegal trade union activities. Antić used the procedure to further publicize the VSS's goals, contending that the union was an entity distinct from the army and that his actions were legal. He refused to appear at the procedure in a military uniform, saying that he was being charged for his activities as a union president rather than as a military official. Antić was supported by the Police Trade Union of Serbia, which described him as a whistleblower and referred to the military's actions as persecution.

In September 2018, Antić was convicted by the tribunal and stripped of his military rank. He described the verdict as "illegal and shameful" and sued the state and the Serbian military of defence for discrimination. The VSS announced that it would file charges against defence minister Aleksandar Vulin for illegal prosecution and that the International Labour Organization was investigating the tribunal's decision.

Notwithstanding this controversy, Antić represented the VSS in discussions with Serbian prime minister Ana Brnabić on improving conditions in the army in 2019. He remarked afterward that the prime minister was genuinely surprised to learn of the poor conditions experienced by soldiers.

In an August 2020 interview, Antić described the military as having become completely politicized and subordinated to Aleksandar Vulin. Two years later, he said that the Serbian army was facing the greatest personnel crisis in its history.

An administrative court overturned the decision against Antić in February 2023 and ordered the tribunal to begin a new procedure. In July of the same year, Antić published an open letter to Serbian president Aleksandar Vučić warning of a "catastrophically bad situation in the Serbian army." As a result of writing this letter, he was expelled from the Serbian military on 26 July. He once again challenged the legality of this decision and said that it was grounded in the military leadership's intolerance of the VSS.

Antić was detained and subsequently arrested on suspicion of embezzlement in early 2024. Soon afterward, the website Politico, citing an unspecified western intelligence briefing, alleged that Antić was a "Russian agent of influence" who had worked with the Russian Federal Security Service to spread a pro-Russia narrative in the institutions of the European Union. This claim was reported by other media sources. The news magazine Vreme later questioned Politico's story, saying no evidence had been provided of collusion with Russian espionage and that, from the available evidence, Antić's meetings with European Union representatives had only been to discuss union issues.

On 14 March 2024, Antić was removed as VSS leader. Two months later, he submitted lawsuits against forty-eight media outlets, accusing them of carrying out "an orchestrated campaign to criminalize him" by failing to seek his comment on accusations against him and, in some cases, refusing to print his refutations.

In 2025, Novica was indicted for embezzling union money worth over 60 million dinars.

== Political activities ==
Antic joined forces with Democratic Party of Serbia (DSS) leader Miloš Jovanović and others to create the METLA 2020 political alliance at the end of 2019. He clarified that he did so as an individual, as the VSS is a non-partisan organization.

He appeared in the second position on METLA 2020's electoral list in the 2020 Serbian parliamentary election. The list did not cross the electoral threshold to win representation in the assembly. He also received the largely symbolic next-to-last position on the alliance's list for the Kragujevac city assembly in the concurrent 2020 Serbian local elections. This list did not cross the threshold either.

In September 2020, Antić indicated that the METLA 2020 alliance had run its course and no longer existed.

In November 2024, Novica Antić publicly announced that he is a member of the initiative to establish the Workers' Party, together with the president of the Sloga trade union Željko Veselinović. At the beginning of April 2025, he announced that he was leaving this initiative.

== Public recognitions and awards ==
In addition to awards and military medals from Serbia, he has been awarded several times by Russian public, religious, police and military organizations, the most important of which are: Medal for Officer Honor, awarded by the Presidium of the Russian public organization "Officers of Russia", Medal of Friends of the People of Russia - Trade Union of the Russian Police, Medal of Lieutenant General ID Volkova for loyalty to the oath and the Medal for Courage and Humanism - Association of Veterans of Combat Operations of the Internal Affairs Bodies and the Internal Army of Russia, the Order for Loyalty to Services and Glory of the Fatherland - the Union of Paratroopers of Russia For his virtues and care for the Serbian Orthodox Church, he was awarded the "Hierarch's Diploma of Recognition" by the Bishop of Šumadija, Mr. Jovan. For his efforts in protecting the rights of members of the army and cultivating friendships between Russian and Serbian soldiers and veterans, in 2018, he was especially thanked by the President of the State Duma Committee for Labor, Social Policy and Veterans, Mr. J.E. Nilova. In September 2021, the Association of Veterans of the "Heroic 549th Motorized Brigade Tsar Dušan the Strong" and the war commander of this brigade, Major General Božidar Delić, established a "monument to the Heroic 549th Motorized Brigade" in gratitude for support and assistance to war veterans; Antić was recognized with an award at this event.

On the occasion of the consecration of the Church of Saint Nektarios of Aegina, within the University Clinical Center Kragujevac, on May 3, 2025, the Orthodox Archbishop of Kragujevac and Metropolitan of Šumadija, Jovan, awarded him the Order of "Leader Karađorđe" for his great love for the Holy Church.

In the period from 1989 to 1997, he was an active member of the Scout Association of Serbia. He is one of the founders of the Independent Scout Unit "Čukarica" and the Scout Detachment "Breza" from Belgrade. He has numerous scout skills and three scout stars, and by the decision of the leadership of the Scout Association of Serbia from November 1996, he was awarded the highest scout title "Scout Eagle".

He is in prison on charges of embezzling union money.

== Trade union and public work ==
He is one of the founders of the Federation of Military Trade Unions of Southeast Europe (Agreement from Sarajevo, 2018, with the military trade unions of Macedonia and Slovenia). During his tenure at the helm of the Military Union of Serbia, this union became a member of the European Federation of Public Service Unions - EPSU and the World Federation of Public Service Unions - PSI. On behalf of the Military Union of Serbia, he concluded cooperation agreements with several international military and veteran organizations such as: the Union of Paratroopers of Russia, led by the hero of the USSR Colonel General Vostrotin, the Fighting Brotherhood, based in Moscow, which brings together soldiers and military veterans 33 countries of the former USSR, Asia and Europe, Officers of Russia, led by the hero of Russia, General Lipovoy, the Brotherhood of Green Berets, the Police Union of Russia and others. He is a member of the Halliard Foundation, which nurtures memories of the action of rescuing Allied pilots from the territory of Serbia, which was under the control of the Yugoslav Army in the homeland during the Second World War, under the command of General Dragoljub Mihailović.

He is the author of the "Manual for the Suppression of Crime in the Military Police" (2012). In January 2021, he and his mother published a book about Serbs from Jasenovac entitled: "Jasenovac, my dear village."
