= Nune Popović =

Nune Popović (born 1974 in Belgrade, Serbia) is creator and pioneer of the massive non-violent resistance to the regime of Slobodan Milošević, for which he was abused by the police and banished by the staged court trials in Serbia from 1996 until 2003. Global media have reported about his engaged creative work: CNN, BBC, SKY, AP, Reuters, Corbis and others.

Since 2000 he has been living in Ljubljana, Slovenia, where he works as a concept creator, copywriter, creative director and advisor in the media and announcing sector. His narrow specialty is web production and creative guerrilla marketing.

He has created the overall image and managed the production of The Human Rights Ombudsman of the Republic of Slovenia from 2001 until 2006.

In 2004 he has established the Nune Production, a creative studio for design, web production, media consulting and guerrilla marketing. Tamara Ćetković is co-founder, designer and art director of Nune Production.

== Selected media ==
- Blog author on the VIP Blog B92 (2006–09)
- Editor of the web portal Media Club of Montenegro (Podgorica, 1999)
- Journalist in the weekly magazine Evropljanin (Belgrade, 1998)
- Journalist and editor in the daily newspaper Dnevni telegraf (Belgrade, 1996–97)
- Founder and editor-in-chief of the magazine Magnet (Belgrade, 1994–95)

=== Books ===
- Anarchy (Cultural Centre of Novi Sad, Novi Sad, 1997); Rusija (Kultura, Belgrade, 1992).

=== Exhibitions ===
- Zoran Djindjic – A Modern Serbia (Center For Cultural Decontamination, Belgrade, 2004);
- Traces of Punk (Student Cultural Centre, Belgrade, 1995);
- Long Live Liberty! (Museum of Contemporary Art of Vojvodina, Novi Sad, 2011).

==== Selected group exhibitions ====
- The Star And Its Shadow (Museum of Contemporary Art Vojvodina, Novi Sad, 2006);
- On Normality. Art in Serbia 1989–2001 (Museum of Contemporary Art, Belgrade, 2005);
- State of Art (SOS, Wienna, 2005; Ljubljana, 2004);
- Art and Resistance of 90's in Serbia (Gallery Nadezda Petrovic, Cacak, 1998).

== Other ==
- Author and performer about 25 actions and performances.
- Member of Independent Association of Journalists of Serbia - NUNS and International Federation of Journalists - IFJ
