= Sofija Trenchovska =

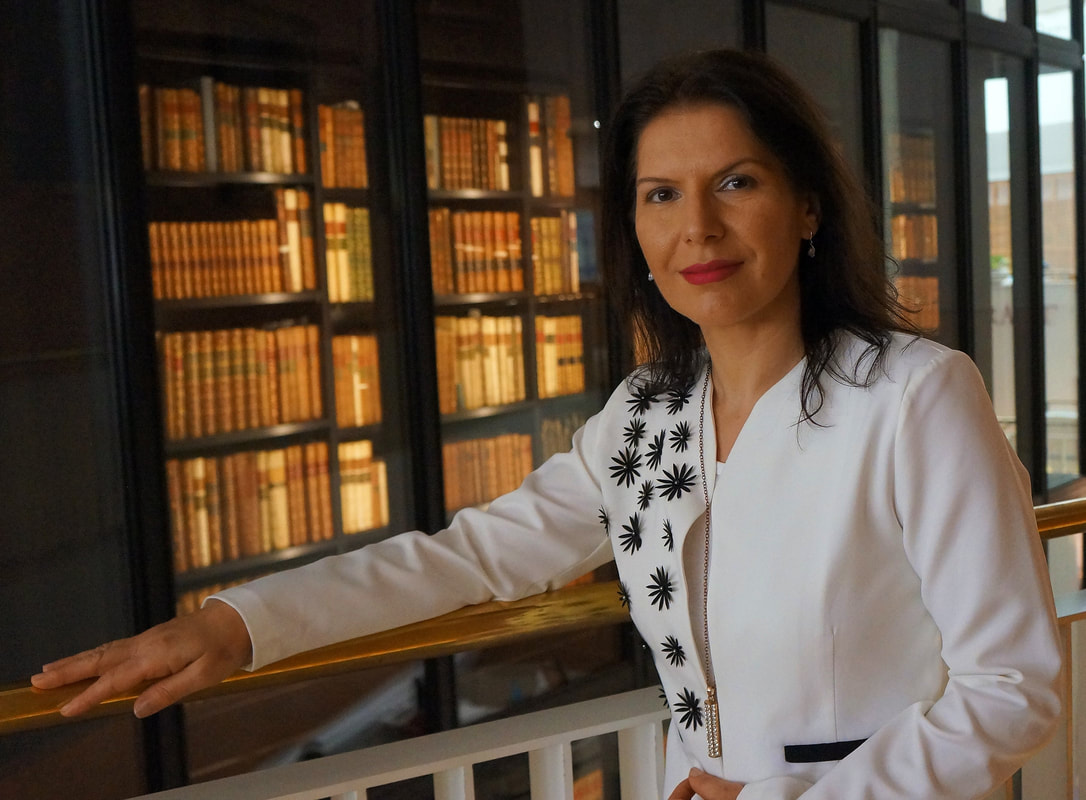
- Born: 9 October 1975 (age 49); Strumica, SR Macedonia, SFR Yugoslavia, nowadays North Macedonia
- Education: Ss. Cyril and Methodius University of Skopje
- Occupation(s): literature, drama, film, Macedonian and Balkan culture, Slavonic and South East European Studies
- Spouse: Goran Trenchovski

Sofija Trenchovska (also spelled as Trenčovska; Софија Тренчовска; Strumica, 9 October 1975) is a writer, editor, producer, philologist and cultural activist from North Macedonia, living in Great Britain.

Her specializations are preserving, digitization and promoting literature. She is the editor–in–chief of the Project Rastko — Macedonia, digital library of Macedonian culture and heritage since 2007.

== Biography ==
She graduated from the "Blaže Koneski" Faculty of Philology — Department of Macedonian and South Slavic Literature (with general and comparative literature as majors) at the Ss. Cyril and Methodius University in Skopje. She defended the master's thesis "Mythopoetics in the early plays of Jordan Plevneš" 2015 at the same Faculty. She completed doctoral studies in the field of literature and dramaturgy. She defended the doctoral thesis “The influence of Henrik Ibsen on Nikola Vaptsarov: Dramaturgical correlations and comparative perspectives”.

For some time, she worked as a journalist in the daily newspaper Večer (Culture section), where she has written lots of articles on education, literature, cinema, theatre and performing arts and as well interviewed artists and cultural workers.

She was engaged in the several publishing projects. She has been editor–in–chief of the Project Rastko — Macedonia (Digital Library of Macedonian Culture and Heritage) since its establishment in 2007. Participates in international symposiums and scientific conferences. She researches and writes texts, reviews, studies and essays in periodicals and books.

Translates from English, Serbian, Croatian and Bulgarian into Macedonian.

== Works ==
=== Books ===
- Edna mitopoetika (A Mythopoetics), Makedonika litera, Skopje, 2015, 164 p. ISBN 978-608-4614-94-4
- Delo i znak (Work and Sign), Makedonika litera, Skopje, 2018, 160 p. ISBN 978-608-252-078-0
- 70 godini posvetenost vo obrazovanieto (70 Years Dedicated to Education): Monograph, editor, "Sofija", Bogdanci, 2016, 72 p. ISBN 978-608-4756-15-6
- Narativnite i estetskite vrednosti vo filmot ‘Zlatna petorka’ (Narrative and Aesthetic Values of the ‘Golden Five’ Film): Papers from a Symposium, editor, TFA, 2018, 151 p. ISBN 978-608-4546-37-5
- 15 Rodnokrajci (15 Fellow Countrymen) – poezija i proza od 15 strumički avtori: CD Anthology, editor, TFA, 2009. ISBN 978-608-4546-00-9

=== Papers (choice) ===
- “Kitsch as Art” („Kičot kako umetnost“), Loza, No. 5, 1997, pp. 9–10.
- “The Ben Akiba comic mask” („Komičnata maska na Ben Akiba“), Teatarski glasnik, No. 47, 1999, pp. 55–56.
- “On film medium” („Za filmskiot medium“), Akt, No. 24, 29.10.2007, pp. 50–51.
- “Demonological beings in Macedonian magic tales” („Demonološkite bitija vo makedonskite volšebni prikazni“), Akt, No. 33-34/VI, 31.7.2009, p. 52.
- “Stelar moments in a holy place” („Dzvezdeni migovi na sveto mesto“), Premin, No. 5960/IX, 2009, pp. 58–59.
- “Postmodern disintegration of an imaginary system” („Postmoderen raspad na eden imaginaren system), Akt, No. 46/IX, 17.8.2012, pp. 42–49.
- “’Erigon’ as the first postmodern play in Macedonia” („‘Erigon’ kako prva postmodernistička drama vo Makedonija“), Sovremenost, No. 2/LXV, 2015, pp. 104–107.
- “Chernodrinski’s ‘Slav Dragota’ and the reasons of Belasica’s defeat” („Slav Dragota na Černodrinski i pričinite za porazot na Belasica“) in: Samuilovata država vo istoriskata, voeno–političkata, duhovnata i kulturnata tradicija na Makedonija, Papers from a Symposium, NI Institute and Museum Strumica, 2015, pp. 298–304.
- “Focalisation in the Abadžiev’s ‘Tobacco Case’” („Fokalizacijata vo ‘Tabakerata’ na Abadžiev“), Mediantrop, No. 10–11/IV, May–June 2015, https://www.mediantrop.rankomunitic.org/2015-05-30-18-01-33
- “Faith and Art: narrative and aesthetic values of the ‘Golden Five’ film” („Verata i umetnosta: narativnite i estetskite vrednosti vo filmot ‘Zlatna petorka’“), Premin, No. 127–128/ XVIII, 2018, pp. 74–75.
- “Creative reflections in Ibzen and Vapcarov drama poetics” („Kreativnite refleksii vo dramskite poetiki na Ibzen i Vapcarov“), Makedonika, No. 19–20/VIII, 2018, pp. 64–72.
- “Carnivalistic instead humanistic sensation of the world” („Karnevalističkoto nasproti humanističkoto doživuvanje na svetot“), Conference proceedings, FILKO, Third International Scientific Conference, "Goce Delčev" University in Štip, 26–27 April 2018, pp. 673–680, http://js.ugd.edu.mk/index.php/fe/article/view/2720

=== Translations (choice) ===
- Dušan Kovačević, "Larry Thompson", a play staged at the National Theatre – Štip, 2001/2002 repertory season.
- Radomir Konstantinović, "Beckett the Friend" ("Beket, prijatelot" / "Beket prijatelj"), Akt, no. 30, 26.12.2008, pp. 53–57.
- Boro Drašković, Director's Notes, with G. Trenchovski, N. Sarajlija, A. Gogov, TFA, Strumica, 2012.
- Zoran Stefanović, Slavic Orpheus, with G. Trenchovski, TFA, Strumica, 2014.
- Henrik Ibsen, Little Eyolf, Strumica, 2014.

=== Producer, organizer (choice) ===
- 2005 – till now – Co–organizer of the AsterFest International Film Festival and of the events organized by the Tiberiopolian Film Alliance.
- 2007 – Producer of the Martin from the Stairs, live action TV series for children (six episodes).
- 2013 – Children coordinator of the Play & Save, short live action film.
- 2015 – Children coordinator of the Golden Five feature live action film and of the Love and Betrayal live action TV series (five episodes).
- 2018 – Coordinator of the international scholar project "Narrative and aesthetic values in the film 'Golden Five'".
