= Fable of the Cosmic Egg =

Fable of the Cosmic Egg Скаска о космичком јајету / Skaska o kosmičkom jajetu
- Written by: Zoran Stefanović
- Characters: First; Second
- Original language: Serbian
- Genre: Tragedy, Existentialist play, Fantasy, Tragicomedy, Melodrama

Premiere
- Date premiered: 1998.

Fable of the Cosmic Egg (Скаска о космичком јајету / Skaska o kosmičkom jajetu) is a theatrical play by Serbian playwright Zoran Stefanović, in a poetic and conceptual dialogue with the plays and life of Samuel Beckett.

The drama received a positive rating from both domestic and foreign critics. It is published in printed and electronic form several times.

It is translated into Macedonian by Goran Trenchovski, English by Marko Fančović, French by Veljko Nikitović (1992), Romanian by Dušan Bajski (2000), as well as into Ukrainian (2010) and Russian (2011) by Lyudmila Markievich.

== Characters ==
- First;
- Second.

== From reviews ==
- "The immunity to Beckett is acquired by a careful study of his work. That could last for a long time, so Zoran Stefanović decided to shorten the process efficiently and effectively, to find a shortcut that won't take away any of his own creativity. Out of several Beckett's dramas he made a new one, by postmodernist rules completely his and autochtonous. It speaks about the things that Beckett's dramas carry inside, but does not speak directly—the writer had to tell it elsewhere and with a different reason: that the human life is most melodramatic of all the melodramas. (...) Stefanović has written an unwritten Beckett’s play anew, taking away nothing, but adding, just by a good combination of things already existing, the irony, optimistic distance and the thing that the primary author generally lacks—humor." — Dubravka Knežević, 1995.
- "/The writer/ brings an atypical (read: non-realistic) sensibility for our theatrical routine, sensibility inclined to experiment, fantasy and grotesque, captivating with its layered, multiple meaning levels." — Ilija Bakić, 1995.
- "/Obviously/ there is a layered intellectual discourse, a particular theatrical aesthetics, as well as referring to the tradition that was most demanding in the history of theater, both for directors and viewers." — Petar Grujičić, 1995.
- "Zoran Stefanovic's poetics is (quite) disparate in our /i.e. Serbian/ literary space. (...) He does not allow himself to photograph; he must have visions. He does not paint, he shapes. He does not take too much from reality, and even what he borrows from it serves him as a material for the search for the essence of people and phenomena." — Vladimir Stamenković, 1995.

== Literature ==
- Knežević, Dubravka. "In Defense of Difference" (afterword of Zoran Stefanović's book "Slavic Orpheus and other plays"), „Flamarion", Beograd, 1995, pp. 179–186.
- Stamenkovic, Vladimir. Review of the book by Zoran Stefanović "Slavic Orpheus and Other Plays", „Flamarion", Belgrade, 1995, first page cover.
- Božović, Gojko. „Početak igre: Zapis o 'Slovenskom Orfeju'“, Pobjeda, Podgorica, 1. septembar 1992.
- Bakić, Ilija. „Knjiga nove osećajnosti“ (prikaz knjige drama), Vreme, Beograd, 18. septembar 1995.
- Vidaković, Dušan. „Orfejevi paradoksi“ (prikaz knjige drama), Valjevac, Valjevo, septembar 1995.
- Grujičić, Petar. Prikaz knjige „Slovenski Orfej i druge drame“ Zorana Stefanovića, written 1995. „Projekat Rastko“, published 2002.
- Radonjić, Svetozar Ras. „Ka novom izrazu“ (prikaz knjige drama), Borba, Beograd, 28. septembar 1995.
- Vuković, Ivan. „Slovenski Orfej ubiva postmodernizam: Vikend sa Marijom Broz“ (prikaz knjige drama), Pogledi, Kragujevac, broj 183, 25. decembar 1995, str. 41.
- Trenčovski, Goran. „Za vo koš?“, Od pitač do kral. Združenie na dramski umetnici i ljubiteli „Talija“, Skopje, dekemvri 1995, str. 59.
- Jocić, G. „Tačka susreta“ (kritika pozorišne predstave), Svetlost, Kragujevac, 1998.
