= The Third Argument =

1995 graphic novel

- The cover of 2016 The Third Argument French release

Publication information
- Publisher: Orbis/Bata (Serbia); Heavy Metal (USA); YIL Editions (France)
- Publication date: 1995

Creative team
- Written by: Milorad Pavić (stories); Zoran Stefanović (script)
- Artist: Zoran Tucić

The Third Argument (Serbian: Treći argument) is a Serbian graphic novel based on the works of Serbian writer Milorad Pavić, with script by Zoran Stefanović and art by Zoran Tucić.

== Creation and publication history ==
The graphic novel was created by artist Zoran Tucić and scriptwriter Zoran Stefanović based on motifs from Milorad Pavić's literature. Other artists also participated in the creation of the novel: costume designer Jasmina Ignjatović (women's costumes), painter and sculptor Jasna Nikolić (figure-concepts), art photographer Milinko Stefanović and graphic designer Rade Tovladijac.

The novel is based on Pavić's stories "The Wedgwood Tea Set", "Horses of St. Mark, or the Novel of Troy" and "The Third Argument", as well as poems "The Game of Chess with Mexican Figures" and "The Novel of Troy".

The graphic novel was well received both by the public and critics in FR Yugoslavia. In 1995, it was published in Cyprus. It was introduced to the planetary public through the Heavy Metal Magazine, where it was published in sections from 1998 to 2000. It 2016 it was published in France by YIL Editions, and republished in Serbia by Komiko.

== Story ==
The novel consists of three stories, "The Wedgwood Tea Set", "The Horses of Saint Mark" and "The Third Argument".

=== "The Wedgwood Tea Set" ===
The story is told in the manner of magical realism.

The narrator is a poor young man. He tells how he met a beautiful, rich young girl from the capital city. The two meet at the Faculty of Mathematics. The girl is looking for someone to help her prepare an exam, so the two start studying together. The young man would visit the girl's house early in the morning, the two would study, the breakfast would be served, after which the two would continue studying. As the time passes, the girl realizes the young man is lagging behind her. When the day of the exam comes, the girl passes, while the young man fails to appear to take the exam. Months pass, with the girl wondering where the young man is. The two meet during the winter, agreeing to study together for the following exam. When the exam comes, she passes, discovering he did not even apply to take it. She meets him again in the spring and the two, for the third time, agree to prepare for the exam together. After weeks of studying, the girl passes, while the young man, once again, does not appear on the exam. Among his books left at her house the girl discovers his student card, which reveals to her that they do not even attend the same faculty. Wondering why he would spend months of studying something that has nothing to do with his studies, the girl comes to the conclusion that it must have been because he was in love with her. Searching for him, she finds out from his African friends that he went home, to Greece, to a village near Thessaloniki. The girl goes to Greece and finds the young man's house. After dinner, he shows her his white bull. While the bull runs across the fields, the couple makes love on its back. In the autumn, the young man proposes to the girl that they prepare the exam together and she agrees, deciding not to mention her discovery about two of them attending different faculties. The girl does not feel surprised when the young man does not appear on the exam, but does feel surprised when she does not meet him again during following months. Sitting in her living room and wondering whether his feelings for her were real, the girl spots the Wedgwood tea set on the table, with a relief of a girl and a bull on the teapot. She then realizes that the young man spent months and months preparing exams with her only so he could have breakfast in her house. She starts wondering if it is possible that the young man actually hated her. The story concludes with the young man's words: "My name was Balkans. Her name—Europe."

=== "The Horses of Saint Mark" ===
The story of the Trojan War is "Slavicized", with Slavic names for Hellenic gods and heroes and numerous anachronisms.

In 4000 BC, a young girl is taken to the forest by the Danube by two older man. They give her instructions about looking into the future. She sees the events happening in 12th century BC through the eyes of Pariž (Paris). Pariž declares how, in the times when Troy still "stood on ships", a woman breastfeeding him fell asleep and had a vision of Troy in flames because of a child "born on the day the mares were taken to the field to be fertilized by the wind". After realizing it is Pariž, the Trojans decide to kill him, but the sailor who is ordered to do it is bribed and Pariž is saved.

Years later, Pariž's father Primuž (Priam) is hunting. After failing to hit a deer from his crossbow, he turns to an "unfortunate and unworthy" way to catch the deer: he prays in order to "tie his prey with his prayer". He takes the dead deer home, where it is skinned. Primuž and his wife lay in deer's skin and make love. When the child is born, his mother, as a repent for his father's sin, names him Jelen (Slavic word for "deer"). When he grows up, it becomes clear that he would not be as beautiful and strong as his older brother, Pariž. However, Jelen is clairvoyant and is sent to a monastery to learn how to use his gift.

The Judgement of Paris takes place, with three goddesses in this version being three female prophets, and Pariž pronounces Venuša (Aphrodite) the most beautiful after she promises him Jelena (Helen), the wife of the emperor Menelauš (king Menelaus). Meanwhile, Jelen is taken to the "Emperor City" (Constantinople) by his teachers, where he is shown four bronze horses "made in the time of Lesandar (Alexander)". He is told that every time the horses move an empire falls. Jelen is, similar to the girl from the story's beginning, left on the coast of a lake. After several days, he sees a white unicorn, and manages to see into the future: Pariž's visit to Sparta, taking of Jelena to Troy and the beginning of the Trojan War. After that, Jelen sees how the Crusaders move the Horses of Saint Mark from Constantinople to Rome, and then a number of dramatic historical events from the future. The story then turns to a contemporary newspaper article about one of the bronze horses being removed from their place at the St Mark's Basilica in Venice in order to go under a restoration. Pariž declares that, at the end of his visions, Jelen saw "you [the reader], who are staring into this images believing you are not participating in the game". The story returns to the young girl on the coast of Danube, who meets a white unicorn.

=== "The Third Argument" ===
The narrator tells the story of Hernán Cortés reaching the Aztec Empire with his troops. Despite having only 400 soldiers, he is convinced in his victory over Aztecs out of three arguments. First, he has 16 horses, which Aztecs believed were evil gods. Second, there was an Aztec legend about a golden-haired god expatriated from the continent who will return, coming from the east, in "the year of reed"; Cortés had blonde hair, and the year of the god's return was, according to Aztec calendar, 1519, the year of Cortés' coming. The third argument was "too complicated to be written or drawn. Thus it remains unknown. The third argument was, however, without any doubt, perfectly clear and known to every one of Cortés' soldiers." The Spanish march into Tenochtitlan, and Moctezuma II offers them peace. One of Moctezuma's closest counselors is sacrificed to the gods; as the narrator explains, Aztecs believed that the human sacrifice was more valuable if the sacrificed was someone close to the person who offers the sacrifice. After the rebellion against Moctezuma, Cortés has to deal with the rebels and the Tenochtitlan falls into the hands of the Spanish.

The story turns to the legend of Juan Diego. During one winter, a poor Indian hunter has a vision of a woman (in the legend of Diego, the apparition was of Virgin Mary, but in this version she resembles an Aztec goddess). He tells a Catholic missionary that the vision told him they should build a temple. The priest asks for a proof, and the Indian returns to the place where he had a vision. Finding nothing, he returns to the priest and, while declaring the woman is gone, fresh roses fall from his robe, which convinces the priest the vision was real. On the place of the vision Basilica of Our Lady of Guadalupe was built.

The narrator (presumably Pavić) describes his visit to Mexico City and the Basilica. Every year a large number of people attend the festivities in honor of Our Lady of Guadalupe. Every time a murder happens; as the storyteller explains, it is quite often that someone kills his friend "in the moment of true intimacy". One such case included a taxi driver who said to his friend: "Wait here, I'm going to fetch a knife. I'm going to kill you", after which he stabbed his friend, who waited peacefully, to death. The storyteller declares: "One evening, returning alone from a dinner, I was thinking about that event. In the dead of night I was passing through huge and desert park Chapultepec. However, there was no need for fear. In the huge and foreign city around me, among millions of inhabitants of Ciudad de México, there was no man who loved me. I was completely safe. The Cortés' third argument is, evidently, still valid."

== Critical reception ==
The comic album was well received by critics in Serbia. Serbian writer and critic Pavle Zelić in a review wrote: "Authors have, in a very precise manner, touched the spirit, the essence of the oneiric, entangled and then disentangled style, which attracted so many readers to Pavić' prose." Journalist and critic Jelena Tasić wrote: "Done after the recipe of three colors – white, red and blue, stories themselves offer interpretation of their own spectrum, which as opposed to phrases of the enlightened, rational European thoughts on 'Liberté, égalité, fraternité', differ and come to persisting Balkan categories of future, present and past." Painter, poet and essayist Slobodan Škerović wrote about the comic: "Mystical charge is not allowing a reader/watcher to unleash imagination but it takes him to the realm where quiet buzzing of instruments of art overcomes the need for unquestionably solid form of ordered existence." He also wrote: "'Wedgwood's Tea Set' is a mythological quest for the meaning, told by a rich visual language and strict narrative suspense. The simulation surpasses the reality and completely compresses it into a decorative symbolism. This kind of inner emanation I only saw with Kurosawa, in Dodes'ka-den and Dreams." Journalist and writer Aleksandar Žikić wrote: "Coldness of colors is in accord with ethereal characters, who are more like symbols and using the rhythm of the prose sample."

The comic was also well received abroad. American comic book artist, writer and editor Archie Goodwin described the album as a "truly visually brilliant graphic novel". Polish critic Artur Dlugosz wrote: "A sensual comic 'Wedgwood's Tea Set' of the duo Tucić and Stefanović, attracts with its colors and execution technique. It is easy to get immersed into that wonderful story [...] Fluid storytelling takes us through new turnabouts of incredible love, describing the consequential attempts and heroically accepted defeats – as well as sudden punchline, which reveals a completely different side of story. If such comics could only be created in Poland..."

== Awards ==
- 1995 – The Comic Event of the Year by NIN
- 1995 – Grand Prix at Zaječar Comic Salon

== The Third Argument in Pavić's work ==
In a postmodern manner, the graphic novel is mentioned in Pavić's novel, The Writing Box (1999):

In drawer there is a manuscript rolled in tube and inserted into a leaf ripped from some graphic novel. The picture shows a bull from whose mouth drips foam. On his back ride a boy and a girl facing each other. The graphic novel is in English and has a title Third Argument.
