= Slavic Orpheus =

Slavic Orpheus Serbian and Macedonian: Словенски Орфеј (Slovenski Orfej)
- Original language: Serbian
- Written by: Zoran Stefanović
- Characters: Orpheus; Dionysus; Apollo; Eurydice; Hades; Sibyl; Pan; Maenad; Nymphs; Satyrs
- Genre: Tragedy

Premiere
- Date: 1992.
- Place: Dojran and Strumica, North Macedonia/SFR Yugoslavia

Slavic Orpheus (1992) is a theatrical play by Serbian playwright Zoran Stefanović, in which the ancient Greek myth is interpreted in the language of geopolitics, Slavic rituals and science fiction.

The theatrical premiere was performed in North Macedonia by the "Anton Panov" National Theater in Strumica (1992) and the radio performance in Serbia by the Radio Belgrade Drama Program (2002).

The play "Slavic Orpheus" directed by Goran Trenchovski (1992) is one of the founding plays of post-Yugoslav dramaturgy and theater in Macedonia and Serbia.

Drama has been favorably received by both domestic and foreign critics, has entered in foreign encyclopedias and the history of drama and theater. It has been published in print and electronic form several times, and a television adaptation of the Strumica performance by the state Macedonian Television has been broadcast more than twenty times via satellite in the 20th and 21st century.

Translations: Macedonian by Goran Trenchovski (1992), English by Dragana Rajkov (2002), Ukrainian (2010) and Russian (2011) by Ludmila Markyevich.

An adaptation into the comic book series by Zoran Tucić and Vujadin Radovanović has been exhibited at several comics exhibitions in Serbia.

== Characters ==
- Orpheus, but also is "Apollo" and Leader–Evilboder;
- Dionysus, but also Zeus, Aristaeus-Serpent, and Hades;
- Eurydice, but also "Hera";
- Apollo;
- Lachesis, the fate
- Atropos, the fate
- Chloto, the fate
- Pan, but also Cerberus;
- Sibyl;
- Maenad–"Frenzied one";
- Nymphs and Satyrs, that are also "Gods," "Goddesses," "Judges," "Dead Souls," and Recruits.

== Awards and recognitions ==
- 1992: Josip Kolundžić Award for Best Drama at the Faculty of Dramatic Arts, 1991–1992.
- 1992 The Macedonian play was included in the official selection of notable Belgrade International Theatre Festival (BITEF), but the Macedonian Ministry of Culture banned visiting Belgrade, based on the United Nations embargo on Yugoslavia (which included culture).
- 1993: Ekran Magazine, Skopje. Strumica Theater performance nominated for best performance in the Republic of Macedonia in 1992.
- 2002: Serbian radio version nominated for "Prix Europa" in Berlin.
- 2010: Italian encyclopedia "De Agostini" lists Stefanovic among the four most significant Serbian playwrights in the post-Yugoslav period, because of Slavic Orpheus.
- 2012: Theatrological books edition "Slavic Orpheus" began in Macedonia, which has published the books of Boro Drašković, Saško Nasev, Goran Trenchovski and Zoran Stefanović so far.

== Critical reception ==
- Successful symbiosis of ancient myth and modern mass media experience. — Gojko Božović, Pobjeda daily, Podgorica 1992.
- Dramatic text by Zoran Stefanovic [...] has several extraordinary features [...] The story of Slavic Orpheus [...] can be read as a careful ethnographic study of the Slavic religion by Veselin Čajkanović, as well as a political essay on the current, so-called New /World/ Order, but also like any American science-fiction comic book by Frank Miller. — Petar Grujičić, Borba daily, Belgrade, 1992.
- What distinguishes Stefanović as an autochthonous author, which is a pledge of his authenticity, [...] is his austerity, bitterness, combativeness, direct provocation. The credit for this is not borne out by his age, but rather by the legacy of the forcefulness of the barbarogenie, the precipitate of a true artistic rebellion characteristic of this part of the Balkans. This combination of a Central European thinking of the world and a violent, Micić would say 'savage', spirit and momentum, now dark, now cheeky, is the peculiarity of the writer Stefanović. — Dubravka Knežević, afterword for Slavic Orpheus and other plays, Belgrade, 1995.
- The writer brings, for the local theatrical routine, an atypical (read non-realistic) sensibility inclined to experiment, fantasy and grotesq, which captivates with layering and multiple meaning levels. — Ilija Bakić, Vreme magazine, Belgrade, 1995.
- Obviously there is a layered intellectual discourse, an original theatrical aesthetics, as well as a reference to a tradition that has been the most demanding in the history of theater. — Petar Grujičić, review of the book Slavic Orpheus and other plays, 1995.
- Zoran Stefanovic's poetics [is] quite disparate in our literary space. […] He does not paint, he designs. He does not take too much out of reality, and even what he borrows from it serves him as a material for the search for the essence of people and phenomena. — Vladimir Stamenković, review of the manuscript of the book Slavic Orpheus and other plays, 1995.Vladimir Stamenković, recenzija rukopisa knjige Slovenski Orfej i druge drame, 1995).
- Stefanovic skillfully uses picturesque metaphors, but also explicit irony, to bring the reader straight to the hidden essence of his plays. [...] He creates a multifaceted and dense manuscript that, quite sovereignly, survives beyond the theater scene. The paradox of its kind is only the fact that, despite their undoubted possibilities, Stefanović's dramas are, to this day, more properly "read" abroad than in Serbia. — Dušan Vidaković, Valjevac magazine, Valjevo, 1995.
- What [...] strikes us first is the great linguistic mastery [...] Stefanovic writes in a juicy, playful Serbian language, to which a combination of ancient vocabulary and syntax, and modern [...] expressions, give a special charm. Perhaps the greatest value of Stefanović's plays lies in the great ease with which their actions at various levels unfold: they simply glide over and pull us irresistibly with them. — Ivan Vuković, Pogledi magazine, Kragujevac, 1995.
- It is not difficult to find parallels with today's situation in the Balkans and in the world in general [...] And everything [in the drama] is given in a humorous and very interesting projection. — Ranko Burić, Politika daily, Belgrade, 2002.

== Literature ==
- Knežević, Dubravka. In Defense of Difference (afterword of Zoran Stefanović's book "Slavic Orpheus and other plays"), 1995.
- Stamenkovic, Vladimir. Review of the book by Zoran Stefanović "Slavic Orpheus and Other Plays", 1995.
