= A Dictionary of Maqiao =

Novel by Han Shaogong

- Author: Han Shaogong
- Original title: 马桥词典
- Translator: Julia Lovell
- Language: Chinese
- Genre: Novel
- Published: 1996 (Chinese); 2003 (Columbia University Press) (English)
- Publication place: China
- Media type: Print (Hardback & Paperback)
- Pages: 400 pp (Eng. trans. edition)
- ISBN: 0-231-12744-8 (Eng. trans. edition)
- OCLC: 51294122
- Dewey Decimal: 895.1/35 21
- LC Class: PL2861.A662 M3613 2003

A Dictionary of Maqiao (Chinese: 马桥词典; pinyin: Mǎqiáo Cídiǎn) is a novel written by Chinese writer Han Shaogong. It was first published in 1996 and was translated into English by Julia Lovell in 2003. Yazhou Zhoukan selected it as one of the top 100 greatest Chinese novels in the 20th century.

The novel is set in Maqiao, a village in Hunan province, China. It is written in the form of a dictionary, or more accurately, encyclopedia. It collects 115 'articles' on Maqiao village life from the perspective of a young student sent there by the Down to the Countryside Movement. These 'articles' cohere into a story.

After the book was published, some critics claimed that was an imitation of Milorad Pavić's novel, Dictionary of the Khazars. The author, Han Shaogong, stated that he had never read Pavić's work. He brought a defamation case against the critics and won this case in 1999 at Haikou.
