= Tucić =

Tucić is a surname. Notable people with the surname include:

- Milan Tučić (born 1996), Slovenian footballer
- Zoran Tucić (born 1961), Serbian comic-book writer
