= Julia Lovell =

British sinologist

Julia Lovell FBA (born 1975) is a British scholar, author, and translator whose non-fiction books focus on China. Lovell is professor of Modern Chinese History and Literature at Birkbeck, University of London. Her works on the Opium Wars (The Opium Wars: Drugs, Dreams and the Making of China, 2011) and Maoism (Maoism: A Global History, 2019) were widely reviewed. Her translations include works by Lu Xun, Han Shaogong, Eileen Chang and others.

== Life and career ==
Lovell was born in 1975 in Carlisle, North West England. Her parents were teachers who encouraged her to study foreign languages. She decided to study Chinese after reading Jung Chang's book Wild Swans (1991), which her mother lent her. Lovell completed her undergraduate and graduate degrees at Emmanuel College, Cambridge. She is an alumna of the Hopkins–Nanjing Center.

Lovell is professor of Modern Chinese History and Literature at Birkbeck, University of London, where her research has focused on the relationship between culture (specifically, literature, architecture, historiography and sport) and modern Chinese nation-building.

Lovell's books include The Politics of Cultural Capital: China's Quest for a Nobel Prize in Literature (University of Hawaii Press, 2006), The Great Wall: China Against the World 1000 BC – AD 2000 (Atlantic Books, 2006), The Opium War: Drugs, Dreams and the Making of China (Picador, 2011) and Maoism: A Global History (Random House, 2019).

Lovell is also a literary translator; her translations include works by Lu Xun, Han Shaogong, Eileen Chang and Zhu Wen. Zhu Wen's book I Love Dollars and Other Stories of China, which Lovell translated, was a finalist for the Kiriyama Prize in 2008. Her book The Opium War: Drugs, Dreams and the Making of China won the Jan Michalski Prize for Literature. It was the first non-fiction book to win the prize.

She was awarded a Philip Leverhulme Prize in 2010 in the category of Medieval, Early Modern, and Modern History. These prizes are given to young scholars who have made a significant contribution to their field.

Lovell has written articles about China for The Guardian, The Times, The Economist and The Times Literary Supplement.

She is married to author Robert Macfarlane.

== Reception ==
=== The Opium Wars ===
Lovell's book The Opium Wars: Drugs, Dreams and the Making of China was widely reviewed in both scholarly journals and the press. Matthew W. Mosca, writing in The Journal of Asian Studies, wrote that the Opium War had "once ranked among the most studied events in Chinese history", but interest had notably declined. Lovell, he said, suggested that there were still holes in English language coverage and that Chinese scholarly and popular interest in the war has, if anything, grown. Lovell, he concludes, "is certainly correct that the Opium War, as an event in the round, has been curiously neglected in Western scholarship" and hers is "the only book-length general history of the conflict in English by an author directly consulting both Chinese and Western sources." He noted that the book devoted much space to explaining how 20th-century politics, especially under the Nationalist Party government of Chiang Kai-shek, used these events to build patriotic sentiment.

Oxford University professor Rana Mitter wrote in The Guardian that Lovell's book "is part of a trend in understanding the British empire and China's role in it," and that the "sense of an unfolding tragedy, explicable but inexorable, runs through the book, making it a gripping read as well as an important one." A reviewer in The Economist commented: "Julia Lovell's excellent new book explores why this period of history is so emotionally important for the Chinese" and "more importantly" explains "how China turned the Opium Wars into a founding myth of its struggle for modernity."

=== Maoism: A Global History ===
Lovell's 2019 history of Maoism (Maoism: A Global History) was widely reviewed. Ian Johnson praised it in The New York Times as the first comprehensive, accessible history of the subject. A review by Andrew J. Nathan in Foreign Affairs praised Lovell's writing but argued that she overstated Mao's global influence: "Mao often served as a symbol for activists who did things their own way, including the Black Panthers in the United States and the Shining Path in Peru."

A broadly negative review in the socialist magazine Jacobin similarly argued that Lovell overstated Mao's influence, but concluded that the book could be used as a resource for leftists "to better understand our history — even the ugly parts." A review in the US Marine Corps' Journal of Advanced Military Studies praised the book for filling a gap in the literature, stating that "A thorough understanding of Maoism's philosophical underpinnings and legacy has become increasingly salient to the American military professional." A lengthy review by Julian Gewirtz in Harper's concluded, "Lovell's history underscores just how difficult it is to export a political idea wholesale, whether that idea is Maoism or the rule of law."

=== Translations ===
Jeffrey Wasserstrom wrote in Time that Lovell's translation of the works of Lu Xun "could be considered the most significant Penguin Classic ever published."

== Awards and honours ==
- 2010 – Philip Leverhulme Prize
- 2012 – Cundill History Prize, longlist, The Opium War: Drugs, Dreams and the Making of China
- 2012 – Jan Michalski Prize, winner, The Opium War: Drugs, Dreams and the Making of China
- 2012 – Orwell Prize, shortlist, The Opium War: Drugs, Dreams and the Making of China
- 2019 – Baillie Gifford Prize, shortlisted, Maoism
- 2019 – Cundill History Prize, winner, Maoism
- 2019 – elected Fellow of the British Academy
- 2020 – Orwell Prize for Political Writing, longlist, Maoism

== Selected works ==
- Lovell, Julia (2006). The Politics of Cultural Capital: China's Quest for a Nobel Prize in Literature. Honolulu: University of Hawaii Press. ISBN 9780824829629.
- —— (2006). The Great Wall: China Against the World, 1000 BC – AD 2000. New York; Berkeley: Grove Press. ISBN 9780802118141.
- —— (2011). The Opium War: Drugs, Dreams and the Making of China. London: Picador. ISBN 9780330537858.
- —— (2019). Maoism: A Global History. New York: Knopf. ISBN 9780525656043.

== Translations ==
- Han, Shaogong (2003). A Dictionary of Maqiao. New York: Columbia University Press. ISBN 9780231127448.
- Zhu, Wen (2007). I Love Dollars and Other Stories of China. New York: Columbia University Press. ISBN 9780231136945.
- Zhang, Ailing (2007). Lust, Caution: The Story. New York: Anchor Books. ISBN 9780307387448.
- Yan, Lianke (2007). Serve the People!. New York: Black Cat. ISBN 9780802170446.
- Lu, Xun (2009). The Real Story of Ah-Q and Other Tales of China: The Complete Fiction of Lu Xun. London; New York: Penguin. ISBN 9780140455489.
- Monkey King: Journey to the West. New York: Penguin. 2021. ISBN 9780143107187. Translation of selected chapters of the 16th century novel Xiyou Ji into lively contemporary English, with an extensive introduction by Lovell and a preface by Gene Luen Yang.
