= Christina Pribićević-Zorić =

American translator

Christina Pribićević-Zorić (born in New York) is an American translator of Serbo-Croatian into English.

Works she has translated include The Dictionary of the Khazars and Landscape Painted with Tea by Milorad Pavić, Zlata’s Diary by Zlata Filipović, Tales of Old Sarajevo by Isak Samokovlija, Frida’s Bed by Slavenka Drakulić, and The House of Remembering and Forgetting by Filip David.
