= Goran Trenchovski =

Macedonian-born writer and director living in UK

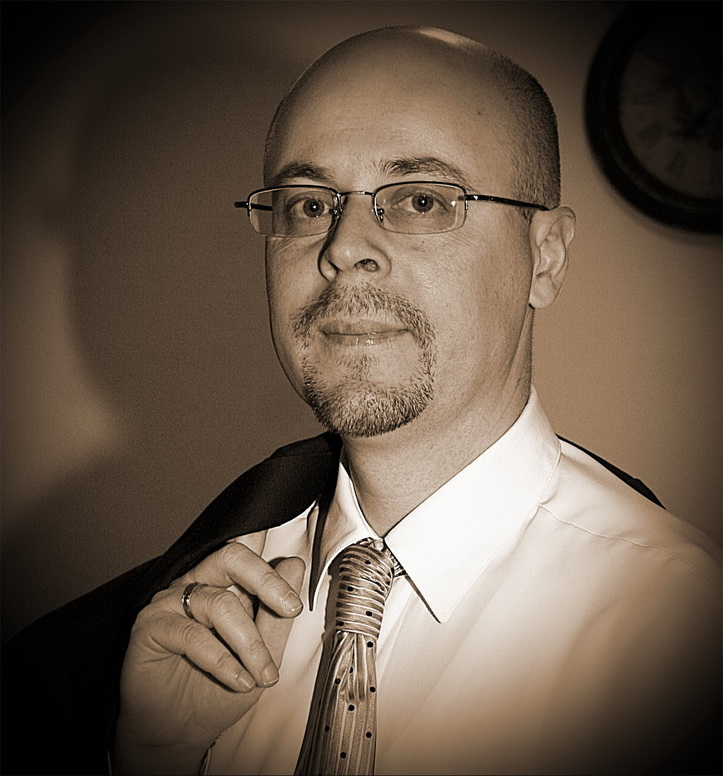
- Born: April 24, 1970 (age 56); Strumica, Macedonia, SFR Yugoslavia
- Education: Graduate Director (1992), MA Thesis (2016), PhD Thesis (2021)
- Alma mater: Academy of Arts - University of Novi Sad, Department of Dramatic Arts, Study programme: Multimedia Directing (1991), Novi Sad, SFR Yugoslavia
- Occupations: Film and theatre director, writer, lecturer, manager, theorist
- Spouse: Sofija Trenchovska
- Writing career
- Pen name: Pit Kralsky
- Language: Macedonian, English
- Genres: Contemporary absurd dramatica, Neo-mythic iconography, Docufiction, Short film, Chamber form
- Notable works: From Beggar to King, Golden Five, Ghoul Quest, Slavic Orpheus
- Movements: Postmodernism, Hyperrealism, Poetics of (de-)Thronization, Director's notes
- Website: www.kralsky.com

Goran Trenchovski (also spelled as Trenčovski; Горан Тренчовски, b. April 24, 1970 in Strumica) is a Macedonian-born director, writer, artistic leader, founder, lecturer, humanist. He is the current head of AsterFest, and lives in Great Britain and in Macedonia.

== Biography ==
Born on Good Friday. As a child he has published poems and has loved reading and collecting comic books. As a young adult he began making photographs.

Trenchovski graduated from the Academy of Arts in Novi Sad with an emphasis in film and theatre directing, in the class of acclaimed prof. Boro Drašković. After decay of SFRJ he became the youngest director on the Balkans known for directing projects on a range of subjects. He directed numerous film and TV projects in different genres as well as stage performances with a number of plays by both classical and modern auteurs. Among the short film subjects he has directed Beggars and Placards, Krecho and Play and Save. His second TV fiction movie, Ghoul Quest acquaints the audience with the fate of an authentic assortment of heroes torn from Balkan iconography, picturesquely sculptured and psychologically represented with all their good and bad sides. He also directed middle-length film projects Slander, Under, and A Step Ahead of Time, series Chubbies, Candidates, Martin from the Stairs, Love and Betrayal, and documentaries I Believe in Macedonia (transferred onto 35mm) and The Spirit of my Father. His multi-awarded cinematic feature film Golden Five is based on true story about unsolved murder of five students in 1951. This film is reviewed by British critics as "a profound and moving film" and as "a mystery thriller of chilling proportions", under "crafty direction encourages us to think".

He lived and researched for one year in Prague, Czech Republic and attended postgraduate studies at the Ss. Cyril and Methodius University (Faculty of Philology) in Skopje where he has prepared the master thesis “Cinesthetic stories of Solev and Čingo (adapted into films by Rusomir Bogdanovski)” and completed doctoral studies in the field of literature and film. He defended the doctoral thesis “Intermedial verifications of the novels ‘The Red Horse’ by Tashko Georgievski and ‘The Gentle Barbarian’ by Bohumil Hrabal”.

He directed Sound Imagery, Slavic Orpheus, Infernal Machine, Libretto Wagner, Leonce and Lena, The Spirit of the Can, From the First Breath, Beggar's Opera and Endgame, as well as plays by Aeschylus, Witkacy, Dostoevsky, Ibsen, Andreyev, Havel, Beckett, Ionesco, Pinter, Albee, Adamov and Arrabal. He was engaged as chief of the department for directing in MTV in Skopje. He was a selector at the IX and X edition of the Festival of Chamber Theatre when he paid tribute to Risto Šiškov's film decalogue. He was professor in the University of Audiovisual Arts - European Film Academy, EFTA Skopje-Paris-Essen-Rotterdam. He also established short-lived Seraphin Tanz group and Academic Theatre Laboratory in the spirit of Artaud, Barba, Grotowski, Kantor and Brook investigations.

Trenchovski also has experience as a producer and publisher. He was editor-in-chief of the Trend magazine and editor of the Shine magazine. Since its inception in 2005, he is founder and artistic director at the International Film Festival AsterFest dedicated to auteur-directed short film subject. The festival has gained an international reputation, thanks to Trenchovski's networking as well as his involvement with the Tiberiopolian Film Alliance. He has eight books related to the performing arts, cinema and autopoetics written in Macedonian, and a collection of writings in English. He is also editor of the anthology of dramaticules Carnival Sighs (1998), the monograph Steps on the Star Planks (1999), the special Beckett 100 (2006), the reader Director's Notes (2013) and translator of the Jiří Menzel's texts Faith and Doubt (2000). He has also directed radio dramas The Lie and The Executioners.

His directions are screened, staged and awarded on festivals in many European countries, as well as in UK, USA, Canada, Australia, Russia, India, Turkey.

He is a member of the European Film Academy and British Comparative Literature Association.

Participates at events, workshops, symposiums and conferences. Lectures on cinema, drama and intermediality.

He introduces and promotes his “Poetics of (De-)Thronization”.

== Works (a choice) ==
Filmography

- Bullfights (short documentary)
- Absurd (short fiction)
- Alter Variations (short fiction)
- The Lie (short fiction)
- Timer (short mockumentary)
- Clochards and Placards (short documentary)
- Oresteia (TV movie)
- "Chubbies" (TV series)
- Strike Woman (TV sequel)
- Half Century with Thalia (TV movie)
- Jiří Menzel and Czech Film (documentary portrait)
- Krecho (docudrama)
- Taleland (TV children series)
- Multilevel (TV drama fiction)
- Ghoul Quest (TV fiction movie released in cinema; premiere 14.2.2002)
- Sixth Day (short documentary)
- The Lakeland of Nicola K. (short documentary)
- Slander (mid-length fiction)
- Home (short documentary)
- One Step Ahead of Time (mid-length fiction about the Manaki brothers)
- Under (mid-length fiction)
- "Candidates" (TV humoristic series)
- "Martin from the Stairs" (TV children series)
- "Vampire Seekers" (TV series)
- Adieus (short fiction)
- The President (mid-length documentary)
- I Believe in Macedonia (documentary feature about Boris Trajkovski)
- The Spirit of my Father (mid-length documentary about Risto Šiškov)
- Play and Save (short fiction)
- Ruby (music video)
- "Love and Betrayal" (TV series)
- Golden Five (narrative feature; world premiere London, 29.9.2016)

Theatrography

- Endgame (tragicomedy, 4.12.1991)
- Sound Imagery (dramatic polyphony, 25.1.1992)
- The Water Hen (spherical drama, 21.3.1992)
- Slavic Orpheus (ritual case, 4.7.1992)
- Lessons in Crime (comical drama, 9.1.1993)
- Eumenides (antique tragedy, 16.8.1993)
- The Turtles from Galapagos (Beckett-like drama, 27.9.1993)
- Libretto Wagner (journey through the last century, 12.10.1993)
- Infernal Machine (drama on terrorism, 11.3.1994)
- Luna Prima (antieurodrama, 24.12.1994)
- From the First Breath (Beckett-like farc-edy, 4.3.1995)
- Leonce and Lena (tragicomedy, 8.9.1995)
- Beggars' Opera (drama, 21.4.1996)
- Off the Rail (southish grotesque, 7.3.1997)
- Eleshnik (drama, 1.5.1997)
- The Story of Philolahes and the Others (adapted attic comedy, 21.6.1997)
- The Spirit of the Can (tragicomic farce, 27.3.1999)
- The Zoo Story (absurd drama, 27.8.1999)
- Macedonian Emigration (drama, 31.3.2000)
- Tobacco Album (multimedia, 4.4.2001)
- Endgame MMI (tragicomedy,11.7.2001)
- Dry Tree from Babylon (Beckett-like drama, 13.5.2005)
- The Big Python (contemporary drama, 9.1.2006)
- Home for Birds (drama based on ancient motives, 25.7.2006)
- Strumica 1918 (multimedia, 9.5.2008)
- Tiburcio and Sinforosa (dramatic divertissement, 15.4.2009)
- Carnal Wonder (drama on oppositions, 20.11.2010)
- End(K)ing (Beckett-like drama, 20.7.2010)
- Once Upon a Time (drama, 13.8.2011)
- Partále (Beckett-like drama, 29.6.2012)
- The Cabinet of Prof. Taranna (absurd drama, 26.3.2015)
- John Gabriel Borkman (drama, 2.2.2017)
- The Idiot (dramatization, 9.12.2017)

Books

- Pit Kralsky – an Artist of (De-)Thronization: selected writings, "TFA AF", Strumica, 2011. ISBN 978-608-4546-04-7
- From Beggar to King [Od pitač do kral: režiserski beleški], Združenie na dramski umetnici "Talija", Skopje, 1995. ISBN 9989-9803-0-6
- Orbis Pictus: makedonskata filmska i TV-režija i drugi tekstovi, "Magor", Skopje, 2001. ISBN 9989-851-49-2
- Poetics of (De-)Thronization [Poetika na (de)tronizacijata], "Tera Magika", Skopje, 2004. ISBN 9989-905-35-5
- Pars Pro Toto: studija za kratkiot film i drugi tekstovi, "Ulis", Skopje, 2008. ISBN 978-9989-2699-4-3
- Kino Neimar, "Makedonska reč", Skopje, 2011. ISBN 978-608-225-040-3
- Theses and Askeses [Tezi i askezi], "Feniks", Skopje, 2015. ISBN 978-9989-33693-5
- Cinesthetic Narratives [Kinestetični narativi], "EFTA", Skopje, 2018. ISBN 978-608-4555-18-6

== Awards and recognitions (a choice) ==
- "Grand Prix: Golden plaque for best directing" - Republic Festival for Young Adults - Štip, 1988.
- "Vojdan Černodrinski Auteur's Award" - Macedonian Theatre Festival - Prilep, 1992.
- "Grand Prix: Best TV drama fiction film", Sarajevo Film Festival, 2000.
- "DetectiveFest: Law and society", Best production, best anti-hero role - Nomination for best film - Moscow, 2005.
- "Award for Artistic Stage Expression" - International festival of Antique Drama - Stobi, 2006.
- "Best Poetic Documentary" - EkoFilm, Festiwal Filmów Ekologicznych - Nowogard, 2006.
- "Sv. 15 Tiveriopolski sveštenomačenici", Award for Outstanding Achievement in Film and Theatre - Strumica, 2007.
- "Docs in Progress" Finalist, Best short documentary - Nomination - Washington, D.C., 2008.
- "Script Fest", Award for Outstanding Achievement in Film - Skopje, 2013.
- "Golden Griffon", Best Foreign Film - Love Film Festival - Perugia, 2017.
- "Best Film in South-East Europe", SEE à Paris, 2017.
- "Best Balkan Spirit", Balkan Film Food Festival - Pogradec, 2017.
- "Best Foreign Film", Jagran Film Festival - New Delhi / Mumbai, 2017.
- "Grand Prize Winner: Best Feature Film", New Jersey Film Festival - USA, 2017.
- "Best Foreign Language Feature Film", Cardiff International Film Festival - UK, 2018.

== Bibliography (a choice) ==
Peer-reviewed journal articles and invited book chapters

- Trenchovski, G. (2019) From short stories to film fiction (Od kratka proza do filmska fikcija). Akt, 66/XV, 47–50.
- Trenchovski, G. (2019) A contribution towards a theory of film adaptation: from story to film (Prilog kon teorijata na filmska adaptacija: od raskaz do film). Zenit, 2/II, 1 November, 127–131.
- Trenchovski, G., Trenchovska, S. (2019) 'The Big Python' as a metaphor for the thieving world ('Golemiot smok' kako metafora za grabežliviot svet) Trend magazin, online.
- Trenchovski, G. (2019) A contribution towards a theory of film adaptation: from story to film (Prilog kon teorijata na filmska adaptacija: od raskaz do film). Link, 2/II, 43–48.
- Trenchovski, G. (2018) The Dionysian in the 'Slavic Orpheus' play (Dioniziskoto vo dramata 'Slovenski Orfej'). Conference proceedings, FILKO, Third International Scientific Conference, 26–27 April 2018. (pp. 681–690). Štip, "Goce Delčev" University, online.
- Trenchovski, G. (2017) The knife, the strings and the guillotine: Büchner's blades and toolkit (Nožot, koncite i gilotinata - sečila i alatki na Bihner). Sum - Miscellaneous, 80/XXV, 117–124.
- Trenchovski, G. (2014) On Mak in Macedonian: my strange encounters with Dušan Makavejev (Za Mak na makedonski: moite čudni sredbi so Dušan Makaveev). Mediantrop, the first electronic magazine for the media and culture in the region: special - MAK, online.
- Trenchovski, G. (2011) Cinema as a 20th-century phenomenon / The pillars of our contemporary narrative film directing / Short film in the beginning of cinema (Filmot kako fenomen na XX vek / Za stolbovite na našata sovremena dolgometražna igrana režija / Za početocite na kratkiot film). In H. Petreski (Ed.), Makedonskata filmska kritika. (pp. 269–284). Skopje, MK: ESRA/Feniks.
- Trenchovski, G. (2011) The Land theatre & the black cube / Fugitive Bride / Actorionship (Land-teatarot & crnata kocka / Begalka / Akterionstvo). In H. Petreski (Ed.), Makedonskata teatarska kritika. (pp. 125–133). Skopje, MK: ESRA/Feniks.
- Trenchovski, G. (2011) Liberty or death (Sloboda ili smrt). Dnevne novine, 26 October, 21.
- Trenchovski, G. (2011) Love, modesty and true facts (Ljubov, skromnost i vistinski fakti). Premin, 121/122, July/August, 78–79.
- Trenchovski, G. (2006) A poetical view to the Turkish part of world (Poetska vizura na turskiot del od svetot). Kinopis, 33–34, 147–149.
- Trenchovski, G. (2006) To see the invisible (Da se vidi nevidlivoto). Akt, 15, 9 May, 51.
- Trenchovski, G. (2004) The pictorial world of the king's land beggar: panagon coronae (Slikovitiot svet na kralskiot pitač: krunski panagon). In A. Gogov (Ed.), Gradovite vo Makedonija: Strumica. (pp. 10–11). Skopje, MK: Kontrapunkt.
- Trenchovski, G. (2003) Shoes (Čevli). Denes, 295, 23 October, 34–35.
- Trenchovski, G. (2001) Foreword (Predgovor). In T. Kuzmanov, Teatarski minijaturi. (pp. 5–6). Strumica, MK: FCT "Risto Šiškov".
- Trenchovski, G. (1999) Waiting for the end of the century (Vo čekanje do krajot na vekot). Teatarski glasnik, 46, 26–27.
- Trenchovski, G. (1999) The Czech film magazines (Filmskite spisanija vo Česka). Sum, 21, Spring, 131–133.
- Trenchovski, G. (1999) Leaving the ‘big guru‘ in modern theatre (Zaminuvanjeto na ‘golemiot guru’ na moderniot teatar). Nova Makedonija, 18729, 26–27 June, 26.
- Trenchovski, G. (1993) Performance sequences / A journey on the post-modern event based on Aeschylus's 'Eumenides' in the site called Ohrid Samuil's Fortress on August 16 in the 1995's summer (Sekvenci na pretstavata / Zapis na edno postmodernističko teatarsko zbidnuvanje na 'Evmenidi' od Ajshil vo prostorot narečen Ohridska Samoilova tvrdina na 16 avgust letoto 1995. In Ajshil, Orestija. (pp. 256–258). Skopje, MK: Metaforum.
- Trenchovski, G. (1993) An apocalyptic theatre (Apokaliptičen teatar). Trend, 1, 20 August, 39–40.
- Trenchovski, G. (1992) The Endgame aka the First Breath (Kraj igre ili prvi uzdah). To jest, 30, 21–22.
- Trenchovski, G. (1985) Strumica at night (Strumica noḱe). Mlad borec, 1492, 23 October, 8.

Conference presentations

- Trenchovski, G. (2018) Director's statement for the 'Golden Five' feature film (Režiserska eksplikacija na dolgometražniot igran film 'Zlatna petorka'). Talk presented at the Narrative and Aesthetic Values of the 'Golden Five' film symposium, 10 March 2018, Hotel Gligorov, Strumica, MK.
- Trenchovski, G. (2017) Literature and film: Past and present. Talk presented at the Literature & Film master class, 3 June 2017, Inalco (L'Inalco est membre fondateur de l'Université Sorbonne Paris Cité), Paris, FR.
- Trenchovski, G. (2017) The Taško Georgievski i Bohumil Hrabal prose's opportunities to be adapted into drama medium: transmedial attributes, similarities and relations (Možnosti za adaptacii vo dramski mediumi od prozata na Taško Georgievski i Bohumil Hrabal: transmedijalni odliki, sličnosti i relacii). Talk presented at School of Doctoral Studies at Ss. Cyril and Methodius University in Skopje annual conference, 9 May 2017, "Blaze Koneski" Faculty of Philology, Skopje, MK.
- Trenchovski, G. (2014) Macedonian documentary context. Talk presented at the Shattered Mirror: The Problem of Identity in the Post-Yugoslav Documentary regional conference, 18 November 2014, Dom kulture "Studentski grad", Belgrade, RS.
- Trenchovski, G. (2014) The end of Samuel's kingdom in the 'Sunset Over the Lakeland' TV series (Krajot na Samoilovoto carstvo vo serijata 'Zalez nad ezerskata zemja'). Poster presented at the Samuel's State in the Historic, Military-Political, Spiritual and Cultural Tradition of Macedonia symposium, 26 October, Hotel Sirius, Strumica, MK.
- Trenchovski, G. (2012) Consciousness for the kinoteatar ascension of the Strumica people with the prefixes 1912/1918: in the Stojan Kovačev's researches (Svesta za kinoteatarskoto vozdignuvanje na strumičani so predznakot na 1912/1918: niz istražuvanjata na Stojan Kovačev). Poster presented at the Strumica and the Strumica Region during the Balkan Wars and the Bucharest Peace Treaty symposium, 27 October, Complex "Sveti 15", Strumica, MK.
- Trenchovski, G. (2010) The problems of the contemporary Macedonian TV film production. Talk presented at the Balkan TV Market Initiative round table, International TV Festival, 27 October 2010, Hotel Princess, Bar, ME.
- Trenchovski, G. (2010) Documentary storytelling in my movies. Talk presented at the Producing docs workshop, International Film Festival "AsterFest", 28 May 2010, NUCK "Anton Panov", Strumica, MK.
- Trenchovski, G. (2007) Macedonian documentary circle: A view into the Macedonian documentary film. Talk presented at the South-East Europe Documentary Network join project, GoEast – Filmfestival des mittel- und osteuropäischen Films, 1 April 2007, Festival Center Villa Clementine Wiesbaden, DE, online.
- Trenchovski, G. (2006) From Beckett to the Balkans. Talk presented at the 100 Years since Beckett's Birth public discussion, Festival of Chamber Theatre "Risto Šiškov", 9 September 2006, NUCK "Anton Panov", Strumica, MK.
- Trenchovski, G. (2005) The old stars on the new screen (Stari dzvezdi na novo platno). Poster presented at the Old Stars of the New Screen symposium, International Film Festival AsterFest, 28 May, Local "Lovište", Strumica, MK.
- Trenchovski, G. (2001) The impressionable naturalness of the style: Risto Šiškov as an actor in the TV-medium (Vpečatlivata prirodnost na stilot: Risto Šiškov kako akter vo TV-mediumot). Poster presented at the Šiškov symposium, Festival of Chamber Theatre "Risto Šiškov", 9 September, NUCK "Anton Panov", Strumica, MK, online.
- Trenchovski, G. (2000) The role of the Macedonian migrant theatremakers in the turn of the twentieth century (Ulogata na makedonskata dramska emigracija vo periodot na prelomot od XIX vo XX vek). Poster presented at the Prilozi za istorijata na makedonskiot teatar symposium, MTF Vojdan Černodrinski, 6 June, Hotel Lipa, Prilep, MK.
- Trenchovski, G. (1999) Directing postmodern theatre: Macedonia (Makedonskata postmoderna režija). Poster presented at the Akterstvoto i režijata vo makedonskiot teatar symposium, MTF Vojdan Černodrinski, 4 June, Hotel Lipa, Prilep, MK.

== Literature ==
- Stefanović, Zoran. "The noble efforts of Goran Trenchovski", a speech on the occasion of 20 years work anniversary of G. Trenchovski, Strumica, Macedonia 4. 12. 2011. (sr)
- Stefanović, Zoran. "The artist is a scholar of Metaphysical: Directing method of Goran Trenčovski as cognition of immense pressure", foreword for book Kino neimar by G. Trenchovski, 14. 1. 2012. (in English)
- Nigrin, Al. "The Golden Five will be premiering in the USA at the Fall 2017 New Jersey Film Festival on Friday, September 22!", interview for magazine New Jersey Stage about American premiere of Golden Five by G. Trenchovski, 9. 19. 2017. (in English)
- Murray, John. "The Golden Five: ‘Ideas that eat up our life and burn us to the flesh!’", review of the Golden Five by G. Trenchovski, 21. 2. 2020. (in English)
- Trenchovska, Sofija (ed.). "Narrative and Aesthetic Values of the Golden Five Film: Papers from a Symposium", materials from the scientific symposium on the Golden Five by G. Trenchovski, 2018. (mk/en)
- Velev, Ilija. "Faces, memories", a speech on the film evening of G. Trenchovski, Akt, No. 58/XII, 29. 1. 2016, 26–27. (mk)
