= Jasmina Mihajlović =

Serbian writer and literary critic (born 1960)

- Born: 1960 (age 65–66); Niš, Yugoslavia
- Occupations: novelist, critic
- Spouse: Milorad Pavić
- Children: Vuk
- Writing career
- Language: Serbian
- Notable work: Paris kiss
- Website: khazars.com/en/jasmina-mihajlovic

Jasmina Mihajlović (Serbian Cyrillic: Јасмина Михајловић, born in Niš, 1960) is a Serbian writer and literary critic. She is also chairwoman of Bequest of Milorad Pavić, famous Serbian writer and her late spouse.

== Biography ==
Mihajlović graduated from the Faculty of Philology in Belgrade - group of Yugoslav and World literature (1987). In the beginning of the career she has taught literature in secondary schools in Belgrade.

She worked on the „Serbian Literary Criticism“ project in the Belgrade Institute of Literature and Art (1989–1991). After that, she was Director of the council for promoting Serbian culture abroad, with the World Serbian Community seated in Geneva (1991–1999). She is freelance artist since then.

Her prose, essays and studies have been translated into English, Russian, Slovenian, Ukrainian and Greek. She writes columns for Serbian magazines Lisa, Grad, Jasmin, Fame, Bazar and Ona.

She is member of the Serbian Literary Society.

== Books ==
- Tale of the Body and Soul. Layers and Meanings in the Prose of Milorad Pavić (Serbian Cyrillic: Прича о души и телу. Слојеви и значења у прози Милорада Павића), "Prosveta", Belgrade, 1992.
- Two tales from Kotor (Serbian Cyrillic: Две которске приче) with Milorad Pavić, "Dereta", Belgrade, 1998, 2005.
- Private collection (Serbian Cyrillic: Приватна колекција), "Dereta", Belgrade, 2000, 2001, 2004, 2005.
- Travel album (Serbian Cyrillic: Путни албум), "Dereta", Belgrade, 2004, 2005, 2006.
- Love Story in Two Tales (Serbian Cyrillic: Љубавни роман у две приче) with Milorad Pavić, "Čigoja", Belgrade, 2004.
- Love without secrets (Serbian Cyrillic: Љубав без тајни), "Dereta", Belgrade, 2005.
- Love with a vocabulary of the unknown (Serbian Cyrillic: Љубав са речником непознатог), "Ljubitelji knjige", Novi Sad, 2006, 2007.
- Paris Kiss (Serbian Cyrillic: Париски пољубац), "Ljubitelji knjige", Novi Sad, 2007; "Parizhskiy potseluy" (Russian: Парижский поцелуй), "Azbuka", Sankt Petersburg, 2007; Zavod za udžbenike, Belgrade, 2010; Amazon, e-book, 2011.
- Travel Collection. The choice of stories (Serbian Cyrillic: Путна колекција. Избор прича), "Alnari", Belgrade, 2008.
- On the Shores of the Khazar Sea (Serbian Cyrillic: На обали Хазарског мора), Amazon.com, Kindle Store, 2014.
- Boring Book. Miscellany (Serbian Cyrillic: Досадна књига. Сваштара), "Dereta", Belgrade, 2019.

== Anthologies ==
- An anthology of stories by Serbian women writers (Serbian Cyrillic: Антологија приповедака српских књижевница), ed. by Rajko Lukač, "Zepter Book World", Belgrade, 2002.
- The Bite of Passion: Stories of Erotic fantasy (Serbian Cyrillic: Угриз страсти: приче еротске фантастике), edited by Pavle Zelić, Society of Sci-Fi and Fantasy fans "Lazar Komarčić", Belgrade, 2007.

== Awards ==
- "Dereta's Book of the Year", 2004, for Travel album
