= Xungen movement =

Root-searching movement in China

- Traditional Chinese: 尋根文學
- Simplified Chinese: 寻根文学
- Literal meaning: root-searching literature
Transcriptions
Standard Mandarin
- Hanyu Pinyin: Xúngēn wénxué

The Xúngēn movement (simplified Chinese: 寻根文学; traditional Chinese: 尋根文學; lit. 'root-seeking literature') is a cultural and literary movement in mainland China emphasizing local and minority cultures. It began in the mid to late 1980s and was compared to the back-to-the-land movement.

Between 1984 and 1985, a transition occurred where writers moved away from the socio-political themes of the early 1980s toward cultural exploration. The movement was largely propelled by "intellectual youth writers" seeking a "reliable foundation for the spirit" following the trauma of the Cultural Revolution. Its premise is that the Cultural Revolution damaged a pluralistic Chinese identity and traditions that had existed for centuries, and that the reconstruction of that identity requires a healthy appreciation of local cultures. Furthermore, the century of modernization and cultural and political iconoclasm had only severed Chinese traditions. Han Shaogong's 1985 essay, The "Roots" of Literature, served as the movement's manifesto, proposing that literature must be rooted in traditional national culture to engage in global dialogue. Some of the key writers are Han Shaogong, Mo Yan, Ah Cheng,Jia Pingwa, and Wang Zengqi.

== Bibliography ==
- Hong, Zi Cheng (2007). A history of contemporary Chinese literature. Brill's humanities in China library. Boston: Leiden. ISBN 978-90-04-15754-5.
