= Vujadin Radovanović =

- Born: Vujadin Radovanović; January 12, 1962 (age 64) Mladenovac, Yugoslavia
- Areas: Artist; Writer
- Notable works: "Čuvari zaboravljenog vremena", "Shine on you crazy diamond“, "Slomljeni svemir", "Candide ou l'optimisme, de Voltaire"

Vujadin "Vuja" Radovanović (Serbian Cyrillic: Вујадин Радовановић, born January 12, 1962, in Mladenovac) is a Serbian comic-book and graphic novel creator.

== Biography ==
He obtained his degree at the Faculty of Architecture in Belgrade. He debuted in Yugoslav comics industry in 1984, as member of "Bauhaus 7" art group, together with Zoran Tucić, Rade Tovladijac and Saša Živković.

Radovanović is known best for his comics "Čuvari zaboravljenog vremena" (writer: Miroslav Marić), "Džo XX" (writer: Marko Fančović), "Projekat Uskrsnuće" (writer: Marko Fančović) "Shine on you crazy diamond“ (writer: Ljuan Koka), "Slomljeni svemir" (writer: Darko Macan), "Pandora Box" (writer: Alcante) and "Candide ou l'optimisme, de Voltaire" (writers: Michel Dufranne alias Miroslav Dragan & Gorian Delpâture).

He worked for publishers in Serbia (Dečje novine, Happy Metal, Lavirint, Darkwood), France (Dupuis, Delcourt) and Germany (Gespenster Geschichten). He lives in Mladenovac.
