= Rade Tovladijac =

Serbian comic artist and illustrator

- Born: Rade Tovladijac; 1 August 1961 (age 65) Ulcinj, Yugoslavia
- Areas: Artist; Writer; Architect
- Notable works: illustrations for The Phantom, Modesty Blaise, James Bond, Batman

Rade Tovladijac (Serbian Cyrillic: Раде Товладијац, born 1 August 1961) is a Serbian fantasy and comic book artist, illustrator, painter and architect. He lives in Belgrade.

== Biography ==
He was born in Ulcinj, Yugoslavia (in Montenegro), and grew up in Čačak (in Serbia). He obtained his degree at the Faculty of Architecture in Belgrade with project "Celestial City – Orbital Station in Lagrange stationary point – L5."

He debuted in Yugoslav comics industry in 1983, as member of "Bauhaus 7" art group, together with Zoran Tucić, Vujadin Radovanović and Saša Živković.

Tovladijac is especially known for his painted covers for popular Yugoslav magazines Gigant, Horor, Tajne, featuring The Phantom, Modesty Blaise, James Bond, Batman and other popular characters.

Among his main comics series are "Ljudi za zvezde" written by Aleksandar Timotijević (Sci-Fi, in YU strip magazine) and "Smešna strana srpske stvarnosti" written by Mihailo Medenica (satirical Saturday page in Press daily, Belgrade).

He has exhibited in group exhibitions in the former Yugoslavia, the UK, Greece and Hungary.
