= Zoran Tucić =

Serbian comic-book and graphic novel creator, architect, scriptwriter and illustrator

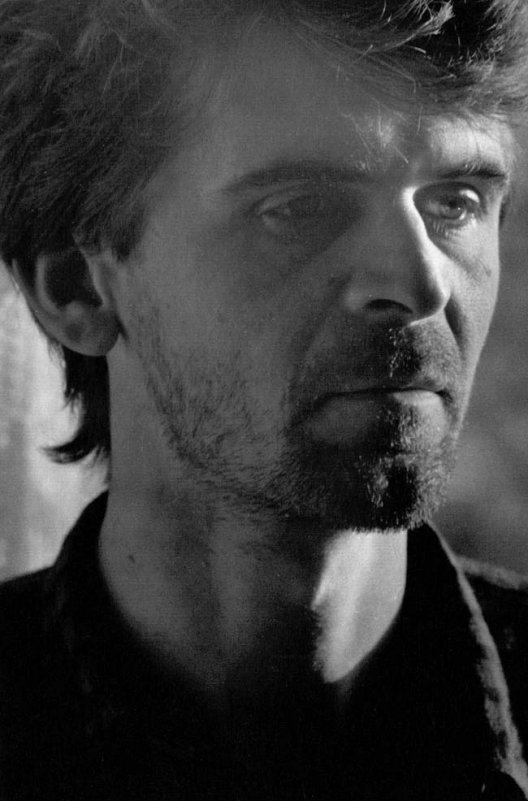
- Zoran Tucić 1993 (photo by Milinko Stefanović)
- Born: Zoran Tucić; 30 October 1961 (age 65) Šabac, Yugoslavia
- Areas: Artist; Writer
- Notable works: The Third Argument, Vorloh

Zoran Tucić (Serbian Cyrillic: Зоран Туцић, born 30 October 1961 in Šabac) is a Serbian comic-book and graphic novel creator, architect, scriptwriter and illustrator.

He graduated from Faculty of Architecture in Belgrade with project „New Egyptian Museum, Giza, Cairo”. With Vujadin Radovanović, Rade Tovladijac and Saša Živković, he was founder of artistic group „Bauhaus 7” in Belgrade, 1981. Published comics in Yugoslavia and ex-Yugoslav countries, Germany, USA, Netherlands, Cyprus, Italy, etc.

He is known best for his comics series "Vorloh" ("Warloch", written by Ljuan Koka, Aleksandar Timotijević) and Z. Tucić, "Niti snova o moći" („Threads of Power Dreams”, written by Koka), "The Third Argument" (based on Milorad Pavić stories, written by Zoran Stefanović) and "Adam Wild" (Gianfranco Manfredi).

He was one of the founders of Association of Comics' Artists of Serbia (Udruženje stripskih umetnika Srbije, USUS) 2010 and its first president till 2015. He lives in Belgrade.
