= Zoran Stefanović =

Serbian writer, playwright and screenwriter

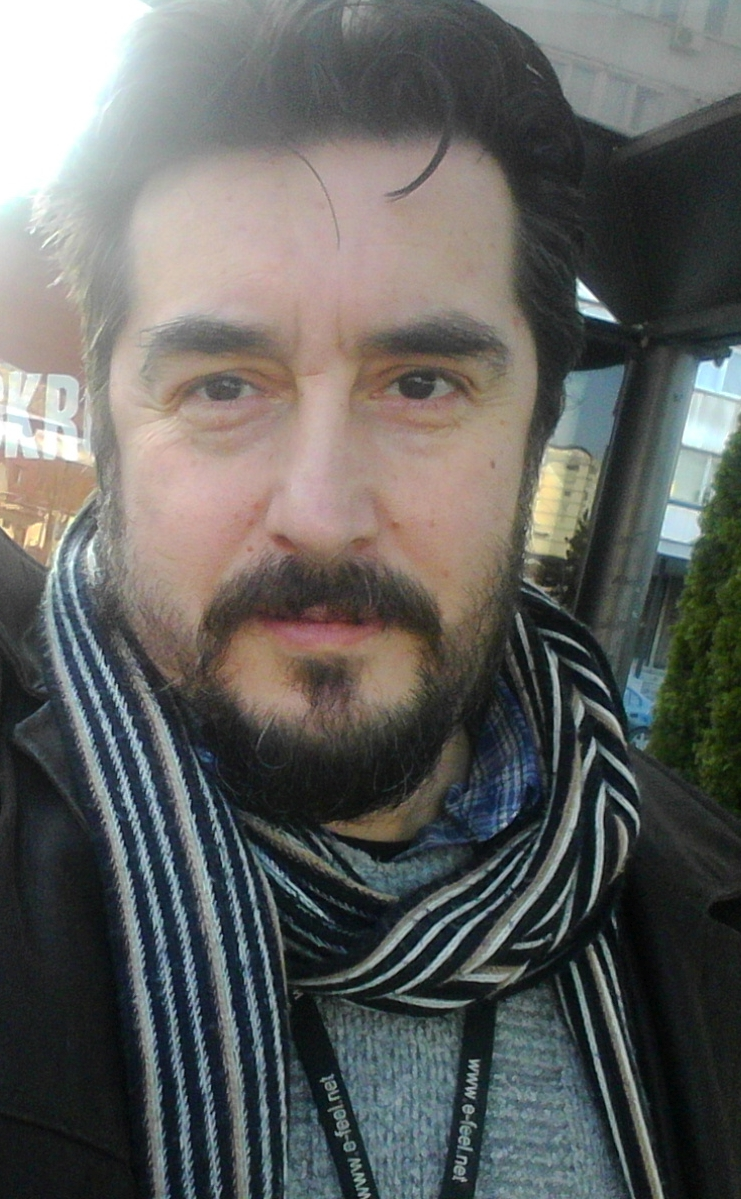
- Stefanović in 2016
- Born: 21 November 1969 (age 56); Loznica, SR Serbia, SFR Yugoslavia
- Education: University of Arts in Belgrade
- Occupations: Writer screenwriter culture historian publisher cultural activist
- Writing career
- Language: Serbian
- Genres: SF, Fantasy, Experimental literature, Short story, playwright, screenwriter
- Notable works: Slavic Orpheus; The Third Argument; The Comics We Loved: Selection of 20th Century Comics and Creators from the Region of Former Yugoslavia

Zoran Stefanović (pronounced [zɔ̌.ran stefǎːnoʋitɕ], Serbian Cyrillic: Зоран Стефановић, born 21 November 1969 in Loznica) is a Serbian author, publisher and cultural activist, best known as the founder of several cultural networks, including Project Rastko. His works were published and produced in Europe and US.

He made his debut in theater and film in 1987 and he graduated in dramaturgy and screenwriting in 1994 at the Faculty of Dramatic Arts (University of Arts in Belgrade). He lives in Belgrade.

He is the president of the Association of Playwrights of Serbia (2022).

== Writings ==
Some of his works belong to science fiction and fantasy - in the theater ("Slavic Orpheus," "Fable of the Cosmic Egg"), graphic novels and comics ("The Third Argument", based on stories by Milorad Pavić, "Under the Seal of the Wolf"), prose (novel Verigaši) and in film/television ("Narrow Paths").

His other works are documentary, such as the TV-series "The Janus' Face of History," or films "Lives of Kosta Hakman" and "Music of Silence" .

His theater plays, prose and graphic novels have been translated into Macedonian, Romanian, Slovene, English, French, Polish, Ukrainian and Russian.

== Cultural work ==
Stefanović was the principal founder of several international cultural networks: Project Rastko (network of digital libraries), Distributed Proofreaders Europe (international digitization of cultural heritage), the Project Gutenberg Europe (Beta version, a public digital library) and similar communities in the fields of digitization, lexicography and pop-culture.

He is also active in cultural and scientific projects since 1993, especially in the former Yugoslavia, Romania, Bulgaria, Greece, Ukraine, Russia and Poland, including preservation of minority cultures as well as initiative for Balkan Cultural Network, with Greek cultural activist and music producer Nikos Valkanos.

Since the mid-1990s he promotes the philosophy of open sources and free knowledge, as "the very foundation of every civilized human society." He actively supports several regional Wikipedias, particularly in Eastern and Central Europe since 2004.

== Awards and honors ==
As a writer, playwright and screenwriter, he has been nationally and internationally awarded and short-listed some twenty times, including The "Josip Kulundžić" award for theatrical play, Gold medal for the screenplay at the 42nd Festival of Yugoslav documentary and short films, two wins in Yugoslav literary SF/F competitions "Znak Sagite", Grand Prix for the best Serbian graphic novel and Award for the best graphic novel script, The Edition of the Year of The Belgrade Book Fair. He was nominated for the Prix Europa award in Berlin and the Prix Italia award in Rome.

For his cultural and publishing work he has been also nationally and internationally recognized, including three times the Annual award of the Informatics Society of Serbia, ten YU Web Top 50 awards (SR Web Top 50) and Webfest 2007 Award for the best culture site of the Western Balkans. He has been nominated for United Nations World Summit Award and Central European Review Content Crown award.

== Selected bibliography ==
Theatrical and radio plays

- An Island Story (Ostrvska priča), 1987, based on characters from Corto Maltese comics series by Hugo Pratt, directed by Zoran Đorđević
- Tristia, 1990.
- Weekend with Marija Broz (Vikend sa Marijom Broz), 1990.
- Slavic Orpheus (Slovenski Orfej), 1992.
- Fable of the Cosmic Egg (Skaska o kosmičkom jajetu), 1992.
- The Meeting Point (Tačka susreta), 1992.
- Snow is not White (Sneg nije beo), 2009.
- A waltz for Olga (Valcer za Olgu), 2018.

Books of plays

- Slavic Orpheus and other plays (Slovenski Orfej i druge drame), Znak Sagite, Belgrade, 1995.

Novels

- Chainers of the World, a novel of our people (Verigaši, roman o Našima), Everest media, Belgrade, 1993, 2012.

Comics and graphic novels

- The Third Argument (Treći argument) with writer Milorad Pavić and artist Zoran Tucić
  - albums, Serbian and English, Bata-Orbis, Belgrade-Limasol, 1995;
  - serialized in English, Heavy Metal Magazine, New York, 1998/1999/2000.
- Under the Seal of the Wolf (Pod vučjim žigom) with artist Antoan Simić
  - Stripmania, magazine, Belgrade, 1996.
- Duke Lipen (Knez Lipen) with artist Siniša Banović
  - Parabellum, magazine, Sarajevo, 2012.

History and aesthetics of comics (monographs)

- The Comics We Loved, Selection of 20th Century Comics and Creators from the Region of Former Yugoslavia (Stripovi koje smo voleli: izbor stripova i stvaralaca sa prostora bivše Jugoslavije u XX veku), a critical lexicon, co-author with Živojin Tamburić, Zdravko Zupan and Paul Gravett, "Omnibus", Belgrade, 2011. (Serbian and English)
- Little Nemo in Slumberland (Mali Nemo u Zemlji snova) Vol. 1-5, introductory essays for Winsor McCay's complete series in Serbian translation, "Makondo", Belgrade, 2013-2015. Vol 1. ISBN 978-86-89161-06-9, Vol 2. ISBN 978-86-89161-10-6
- Dikan. Vol. 1, (1969-1971), by Lazo Sredanović, Nikola Lekić et al., editing and essays, "Everest Media", Belgrade 2013. ISBN 978-86-7756-027-0
- "The Soundless Hiss: A critical history of Kobra comics series" ("Siktaj bez zvuka: kritička istorija serijala Kobra"), in: Kobra, Vol. 1, by Svetozar Obradović and Branislav Kerac, "Darkwood", Belgrade, 2013, pp. 157–189. ISBN 978-86-6163-139-9
- Lectures on comics (Predavanja o stripu), DVD, co-author, edited by Mićun Ristić, Dom kulture Studentski grad, 2014. ISBN 978-86-7933-068-0

== Selected filmography ==
Writer

- Give my regards to all who ask for me (Pozdravi sve koji pitaju za mene), documentary, 1987 (script collaborator)
- Ars longa, vita brevis, 1991
- Slavic Orpheus (Slovenski Orfej), theatrical adaptation, 1992
- Janus' Face of History (Janusovo lice istorije) 1–3, documentary mini-series, 1993
- Narrow Paths (Uske staze), short, 1995
- Lives of Kosta Hakman (Životi Koste Hakmana), documentary, 2005
- Music of Silence (Muzika tišine), documentary, 2011
- 120 years of Serbian Literary Cooperation (120 godina Srpske književne zadruge), documentary 2012
- Lectures on comics (Predavanja o stripu), documentary, 2014 (contributing writer)
- Sava Lozanić bells (Zvona Save Lozanića), documentary, 2018

Producer

- My dead town (Moj mrtvi grad), documentary, 2000
- Lives of Kosta Hakman (Životi Koste Hakmana), documentary, 2005

Casting Departement

- Largo Winch, 2008 (casting: Serbia)
