= Milorad Pavić =

Serbian writer, literary historian and university professor

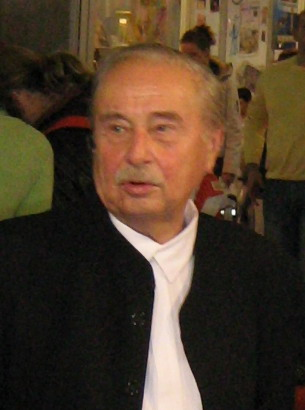
- Pavić at the 2007 Belgrade Book Fair
- Born: 15 October 1929; Belgrade, Kingdom of Yugoslavia
- Died: 30 November 2009 (aged 80); Belgrade, Serbia
- Resting place: New Cemetery, Belgrade
- Education: University of Belgrade
- Occupation: Writer • poet • literary historian • translator
- Spouses: Branko Bast (m. 1958, divorced); Jasmina Mihajlović (m. 1992)
- Children: 2
- Writing career
- Language: Serbian
- Genres: Experimental novel, Short story, playwright, poetry
- Notable works: Dictionary of the Khazars; Landscape Painted with Tea; The Inner Side of the Wind
- Movement: Postmodernism
- Website: www.khazars.com/en/

Milorad Pavić (Serbian Cyrillic: Милорад Павић, pronounced [mîloraːd pǎːʋitɕ]; 15 October 1929 – 30 November 2009) was a Serbian writer, university professor, translator, literary historian and academic. He published a number of poems, short stories and novels during his lifetime, the most famous of which was the Dictionary of the Khazars (1984). Upon its release, it was hailed as "the first novel of the 21st century." Pavić's works have been translated into more than thirty languages. He was vastly popular in Europe and in South America, and was deemed "one of the most intriguing writers from the beginning of the 21st century." He won numerous prizes in Serbia and in the former Yugoslavia, and was mentioned several times as a potential candidate for the Nobel Prize in Literature.

== Biography ==
Milorad Pavić was born in Belgrade, Kingdom of Yugoslavia on 15 October 1929 to a distinguished family of intellectuals and writers "that has produced well-known writers for six generations, since the 18th century". He received a Bachelor of Arts in literature from the University of Belgrade, and later obtained a PhD in literary history at the University of Zagreb.

Pavić entered the literary scene with two collections of poetry titled Palimpsests (Palimpsesti), and Moon Stone (Mesečev kamen), published in 1969 and 1971, respectively. Pavić's poems were soon translated into English, and included in the anthology titled Contemporary Yugoslav Poems. Soon after, Pavić dedicated himself to writing prose and several short story collections were published. Pavić's first and most famous novel, Dictionary of the Khazars (Hazarski rečnik), was published in 1984. It received widespread critical acclaim upon release, and was hailed as "the first novel of the 21st century." Written as a poetic dictionary, the book has been described as "a quasi-historical account of the semi-imaginary tribe of the Khazars."

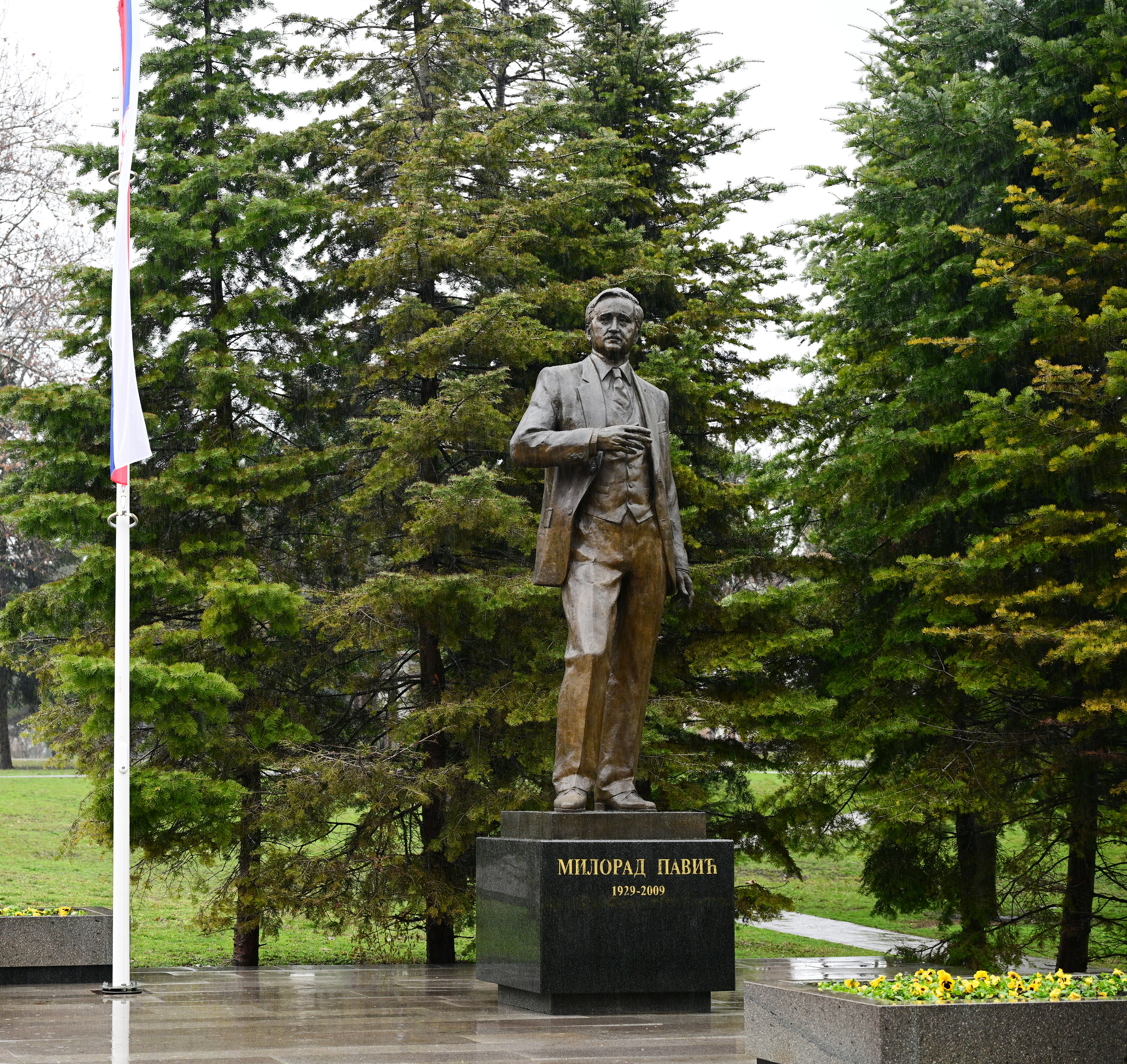
Monument to Milorad Pavić in Tašmajdan Park, Belgrade.

Pavić's second novel was titled Landscape Painted with Tea, and was published in 1988. Organized as a crossword puzzle, it follows a failed architect from Belgrade as he travels to Greece to trace the fate of his father who disappeared there during World War II. Pavić wrote many more novels, including The Inner Side of the Wind, or A Novel of Hero and Leander and Last Love in Constantinople: A Tarot Novel of Divination. Described as "highly imaginative", Pavić is said to have "[done] everything to disrupt the traditional models of fiction writing such as the development of story and the notions of beginning and end." He was described as being "one of the most intriguing writers from the beginning of the 21st century." As a result, he was mentioned several times as a potential candidate for the Nobel Prize in Literature.

Apart from writing, Pavić taught philosophy at the University of Novi Sad before joining the University of Belgrade. In 1991, he became a member of the Serbian Academy of Sciences and Arts (SANU). During this time, he translated a number of works of Russian fiction into the Serbian language. In 1993, he published his first play, titled Theatre Menu For Ever and a Day.

Pavić died in Belgrade on 30 November 2009, at the age of 80. His death came as the result of a heart attack. He was survived by his wife, Jasmina Mihajlović, and by his son Ivan. His daughter Jelena committed suicide the year prior. Pavić was buried in the "Alley of the Greats" at the Novo Groblje cemetery complex in Belgrade.

== Works ==
Originally written in Serbian, Pavić's works have been translated into more than thirty languages. Pavić was renowned for his highly imaginative fiction, and his novels diverged from traditional literary notions by means of an open-ended structure and the entwining of the mythic and historical.

=== Dictionary of the Khazars ===
Dictionary of the Khazars was Pavić's first novel and it acquired international success. Written in 1984, it is a lexicon-format novel which follows the story of the Khazars – a people occupying the territory north of the Caucasus and west and north of the Caspian Sea between the 6th and 11th centuries. In the book, the Great Khan of the Khazars has a dream that is nearly impossible to interpret. To shed some light on it, he summons representatives of the world's three great religions: a Christian, a Jew and a Muslim. He asks the three to explain the dream, promising that the entire Khazar tribe will convert to the religion which provides the most convincing explanation. In three dictionaries – one Christian, one Jewish and one Muslim – three different versions of the story are presented, and from these accounts the reader must try to confect a coherent novel.

== Works available in English ==
- Dictionary of the Khazars (1984) (Knopf, 1988)
- Landscape Painted with Tea (1988) (Knopf, 1990)
- The Inner Side of the Wind, or A Novel of Hero and Leander (1991) (Knopf, 1993)
- Last Love in Constantinople (1994) (Peter Owen Publishers, 1998)
- The Third Argument (1995), a graphic novel by Milorad Pavić, Zoran Tucić (artist) and Zoran Stefanović (scriptwriter)
- For Ever and a Day (1997) (Kindle Edition e-book, 2012)
- Damascene (1998) Available online (1998)
- Writing Box (1999) (National Library of Serbia, 2012)
- The Glass Snail (2003) Available online (2003) Graphics and Design as an electronic literature piece by Robert Kendall, Marjorie Luesebrink, and Rob Swigart.
- Unique Item (2004) (Published in two volumes, Unique Item and Blue Book, as Kindle Edition e-books, 2010)
- The Tale that Killed Emily Knorr (2005) (Kindle Edition e-book, 2012)
- Second Body (2007) (Kindle Edition e-book, 2010)

== Awards ==
Academician Milorad Pavić was the winner of several literary awards:

- "Đorđe Jovanović" award, for the book History of Literature of the Baroque Era, 1971.
- NIN's award, for the novel Khazarski rečnik, 1985.
- "Meša Selimović" award, for the novel Landscape painted with tea, 1988.
- Award of AVNOJ, 1989.
- Seventh of July Award, 1989.
- Award of the National Library of Serbia for the most read book of the year, for the novel Landscape painted with tea, 1990.
- October Award of the City of Belgrade, for the entire book oeuvre, 1992.
- "Borisav Stanković" award, for the novel Unutrašnja strana vetra, 1992.
- Award "Golden Beočug" for lifetime achievement, 1992.
- "Stefan Mitrov Ljubiša" award, 1994.
- Kočić Award, 1994.
- Prosvetina Award, for the novel Last Love in Constantinople, 1994.
- "Laza Kostić" award, for the novel Last Love in Constantinople, 1995.
- "Felix Romuliana" award, 1995.
- Exceptional Wolf Award, 1996.
- Award of the Jakov Ignjatović Foundation, for life's work, 1997.
- The "Račanska čartita" award, for overall creativity, 1997.
- "Deretina's Book of the Year" award, for the novel Zvezdani plast, 1998.
- "Nušić's staff" award, for overall creativity, 1999.
- The "Dušan Vasiljev" award, for a story-telling opus, 2000.
- The Andrić Prize, for the series of short stories Stories from the Sava slopes, 2001.
- "Belovod Rosette" Award, 2004.
- High recognition "Dostoevsky", 2004.
- "Kočić's Book" Award of the "Petar Kočić" Endowment, 2007.
- Honorary doctor of Sofia University
- President of the Serbian-Ukrainian Society
- Member of the European Association for Culture, member of the Serbian PEN Center, member of the Crown Council.
