= Han Shaogong =

Chinese novelist

- 韩少功
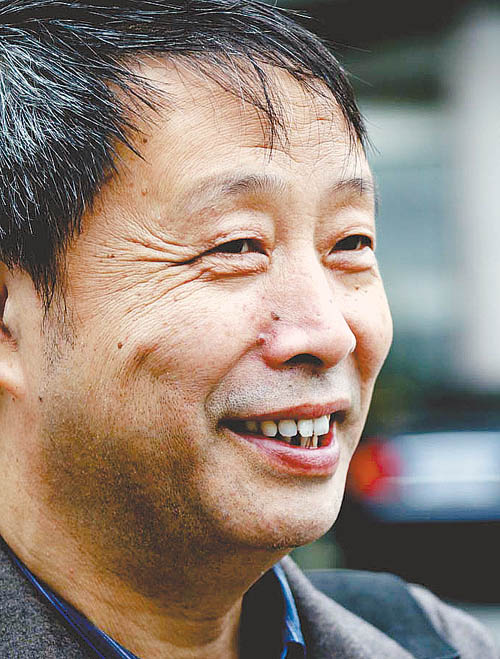
- Han Shaogong, 2006
- Born: January 1, 1953 (age 73); Changsha, Hunan, China
- Occupation: Novelist
- Writing career
- Language: Chinese
- Period: 1981–present
- Genre: Novel
- Notable work: A Dictionary of Maqiao

Han Shaogong (simplified Chinese: 韩少功; traditional Chinese: 韓少功; pinyin: Hán Shàogōng; born January 1, 1953) is a Chinese novelist and fiction writer.

== Biography ==
Han was born in Hunan, China. While relying on traditional Chinese culture, in particular Chinese mythology, folklore, Taoism and Buddhism as source of inspiration, he also borrows freely from Western literary techniques. As a teenager during the Cultural revolution he was labeled an ‘educated youth’ and sent to the countryside for re-education through labour. Employed at a local cultural center after 1977, he soon won recognition as an outspoken new literary talent. His early stories attacked the ultra-leftist degradation of China during the Mao era; they tended toward a slightly modernist style. However, he reemerged in the mid-1980s as the leader of an avant-garde school, the "Search for Roots" or the Xungen Movement.

== Work ==
Han's major work to date is A Dictionary of Maqiao, a novel published in 1996 and translated into English in 2003. His writing is influenced by Kafka and by the magic realism of Gabriel García Márquez. In 1987, he published a Chinese translation of Milan Kundera's The Unbearable Lightness of Being and edited Hainan Jishi Wenxue ("Hainan Documentary Literature"), a successful literary magazine. He has been given the French Ordre des Arts et des Lettres and with other Chinese writers visited France in 1988 at the invitation of the French Ministry of Culture. Han was invited back in 1989 but was denied permission to leave China until 1991.

Han's other works include Moon Orchid (1985), Bababa (1985), Womanwomanwoman (1985), Deserted City (1989), and Intimations (2002).

== Awards ==
- In 2011 Han was awarded the Newman Prize for Chinese Literature.
