= Branko Plavšić =

Serbian comic book artist

- Areas: Writer, penciller, inker, illustrator
- Pseudonym: Plaker (with Branislav Kerac)
- Notable works: Tarzan, Il Grande Blek, Balkan Express

Branko Plavšić (1949 – 2011) was a Serbian comic book artist, best known for his work on Tarzan and Blek.

== Professional career ==
Still a student, Plavšić published his early drawings in Male novine (Oslobođenje, Sarajevo). Inspired by the works of Hal Foster and Jijé as well as Aleksandar Hecl's Tarzan illustrations, he submitted a couple of samples to Dečje novine in 1966. Editor Srećko Jovanović asked Plavšić to come up with a complete story, after which he was hired.

Plavšić went on to work on a war comic called Mirko and Slavko, the most popular Yugoslav title of the 1960s, published in the Nikad robom series as well as children's magazines Zeka and Tik-tak. Plavšić was one of the few authors other than the series’ creator Desimir Žižović Buin allowed to do their own short stories instead of being background or ghost artists.

He also contributed five episodes to Blažo and Jelica, a historical series created by writer Dobrica Erić and artist Radivoj Bogičević.

During his tenure with the publisher from Gornji Milanovac, Plavšić got the chance to create his first character named Kelly Brando for the Zenit magazine, influenced by Arturo Del Castillo.

Plavšić went briefly to Munich, Germany in 1972 to draw stories starring Rolf Kauka's Fix and Foxi and Die Pichelsteiner in Walter Neugebauer's studio. He considered the latter his “artistic father.” Under Neugebauer's supervision, Kauka's Fix and Foxi became Germany's most successful comics magazine, even surpassing Walt Disney's Mickey Mouse. The same year Neugebauer broke with Kauka, after quarreling over finances and copyrights.

Plavšić returned to work in Yugoslavia and was hired as the first professional comic book artist by Dnevnik (Novi Sad). He made a debut with Il Grande Blek (episode “Gužva u Bostonu,” written by Svetozar Obradović). In former Yugoslavia the Italian comic was published in the Lunov magnus strip and Strip zabavnik series. The character reached the print run of 100,000, so the local publisher decided to produce its own licensed material, colloquially known as YU Blek. In addition, Plavšić created a number of covers for Lunov magnus strip and Zlatna serija, featuring Italian characters such as Zagor, Tex and Il Piccolo Ranger.

In 1982 Plavšić transferred to Forum, where he would ink Branislav Kerac's pencils on Tarzan. From 1983 to 1989 the title was produced by a team of artists in Yugoslavia, and later translated and published in Sweden, Norway, Finland, Germany, the Netherlands, and Denmark. There were over 100 published episodes, each of which had 16 pages. Sometimes the duo used the pseudonym “Plaker” (Plavšić + Kerac).

They teamed up for another popular title, Balkan Express, based on Gordan Mihić’s script for the film of the same name.

Plavšić also created a number of war and Western shorts, published in Stripoteka, Neven and YU strip.

The Yugoslav comics scene collapsed with the breakup of the country in the 1990s. After a break in the 2000s, Plavšić briefly returned to inking in the 2010s.

== Influence ==
Certainly one of the best, if not the best inker in Europe... In fact, I think that Marvel would be more than happy to have him.

— Svetozar Tomić, editor of Stripoteka

Plavšić’s work on Il Grande Blek was received as well as the Italian and French incarnations, which paved the way for the local production in the 1980s. The long list of local creators included Petar Aladžić, Ivica Mitrović, Svetozar Obradović, Stevan Brajdić, Milorad Žarić, Miodrag Ivanović, Predrag Ivanović, D. Ivković, Branislav Kerac, Bojan Kerzan, Pavel Koza, Vladimir Krstić, Spasoje Kulauzov, Marinko Lebović, B. Ljubičić, Stevo Maslek, Nikola Maslovara, Radič Mijatović, Željko Mitrović, Ahmet Muminović, Slavko Pejak, Dušan Pivac, Zdravko Popović, Sibin Slavković (pen name "S. Žunjević"), Ljubomir Filipov and Adam Čurdinjaković.

Plavšić's work has recently been reprinted in collected editions in Serbia.

A comic book award given annually by the Kragujevac comic convention is named after Branko Plavšić. A comic book club from Niš also bears his name.

Comic book characters named Kelly Brando (drawn by Kerac and Plavšić) and trapper Brandy (Blek by Kerac) were modeled after Branko.

== Personal life ==
Branko Plavšić was born in Mala Novska Rujiška (Yugoslavia, presently Bosnia and Herzegovina) in 1949. His family moved to Bač, Serbia in 1955. Having finished elementary school, he enrolled in School of Applied Arts but had to drop out due to family circumstances. He was a father of three. Plavšić died in 2011.

== Bibliography ==
- Mirko and Slavko
- Blažo and Jelica
- Fix und Foxi
- Il Grande Blek
- Tarzan
- Balkan Express
