= Džuboks =

Yugoslav music magazine

- The cover of the 24 September 1982 Džuboks issue featuring Pete Townshend
- Categories: Music magazine
- Frequency: Monthly (1966-1969, 1974-1983); Weekly (1983-1986)
- Publisher: NIP Duga (1966-1969); NIP Dečje novine (1974-1986)
- Founded: 1966
- First issue: 3 May 1966
- Final issue: March 1986
- Country: SFR Yugoslavia
- Language: Serbo-Croatian
- Website: Džuboks archive at Popboks.com

Džuboks (Serbian Cyrillic: Џубокс, trans. Jukebox) was a Yugoslav music magazine, launched in 1966. The first publication in SFR Yugoslavia dedicated predominantly to rock music and the first rock music magazine to be published in a communist country, Džuboks is often described as Yugoslavia's most prominent music magazine.

Founded by the Belgrade-based Duga publishing company, Džuboks was not the country's first popular music magazine (it was preceded by jazz and popular music magazine Ritam), but was the first magazine in Yugoslavia oriented primarily towards rock music. Its initial editor-in-chief was radio personality and national chess champion Nikola Karaklajić. Despite the success of the magazine, with initial circulation of 100,000 copies, Duga stopped publishing Džuboks in 1969. In 1974, the Dečje novine publishing company re-launched Džuboks, initially as a supplement to the magazine Lada, and in 1976 Džuboks re-appeared as a standalone publication. The magazine was discontinued in 1986.

== History ==
=== Launch ===
First issue of Džuboks, released on 3 May 1966, featuring the Rolling Stones on the cover

Džuboks was launched during spring of 1966 by the Belgrade-based Duga publishing company, in the aftermath of the three-day Gitarijada music festival, whose large attendance and euphoric atmosphere several months earlier at the Belgrade Fair were indicative of the rising popularity of rock music locally. The idea for a monthly rock music magazine came from Duga staff journalists that had already been writing for the company's weekly film magazine Filmski svet (Film World); they now felt that an entirely new publication catering to the growing number of rock music fans in Yugoslavia could prove successful. As Duga employed no rock music writers or reviewers among its staff at the time, they decided to reach out to 40-year-old Nikola Karaklajić—a radio personality who had already been involved with rock music in Belgrade in organizational and promotional capacity—with an offer of becoming the Džuboks' editor-in-chief. Karaklajić—who in addition to his Radio Belgrade job also pursued chess professionally, becoming the national champion and member of the Yugoslav national chess team—accepted the offer and set about creating a rock magazine. Although not the first popular music magazine to be published in Yugoslavia (it was preceded by jazz and popular music magazine Ritam, launched four years earlier), Džuboks was the first magazine dedicated specifically to rock music in Yugoslavia as well as in a post-World War II socialist state.

Due to being able to get my hands on foreign [English language] music magazines, I picked up the tricks used by NME, Melody Maker, etc. And we put together a magazine that ended up reaching a circulation of 100,000 copies, each issue flying off the newsstands within three days of appearing.

— Džuboks' original editor-in-chief Nikola Karaklajić on his approach to editing a music magazine.

The first issue came out on 3 May 1966. There was a huge discussion among the editorial staff whether the Beatles or the Rolling Stones should appear on the cover of the first issue, and the opinion favoring the Rolling Stones prevailed. The first Yugoslav rock band to appear on the Džuboks cover were Roboti, appearing on the cover of the ninth issue.

=== 1966–1969 ===
Initial Džuboks issues were published with the "Filmski svet's special supplement" inscription printed at the bottom of each cover, a practice that would soon be dropped. The magazine received no negative reactions from the ruling League of Communists of Yugoslavia (SKJ), though it did from conservative cultural circles. According to Karaklajić, there was no political interference into the editorial policy. Karaklajić further stated that the only political interference occurred after the magazine's launch via an SKJ representative asking for a meeting with the editors, "to see what was going on and to advise us to be cautious, so as not to be regarded as someone's agency".

Historian Radina Vučetić, in her book Koka-kola socijalizam (Coca-Cola Socialism), wrote:

During the 1950s, the Ideological Commission [of the League of Communists] often discussed the West influences, considered 'decadent' and dangerous even after 1948 [the year of Tito–Stalin split, followed by Yugoslavia opening towards the West], while during the 1960s these topics remain almost unmentioned. During the 1960s, the [Communist] Party's main worries were dissidents and the rise of nationalism, as threats to the inviolable [principle of] brotherhood and unity and to the unquestionable Marxist dogma. It was probably estimated that a magazine dedicated to young audience could even prevent these dangers and that, by offering an abundance of rock sound and colorful pictures, it could diminish other problems. [...] Generally, there was nothing in the concept of Džuboks which could indicate that it was published in a socialist country — there weren't glorification of Tito, any mention of the Party, Yugoslav self-management or the youth work actions, and all of it, from the front to the back cover, could have been printed in any Western country. Džuboks wasn't meant for young communists only, it was meant for young people.

In December 1966, following the 9th issue, Karaklajić left the editor-in-chief post and was replaced with Sava Popović, whose first issue came out in February 1967.

Višnja Marjanović, Džuboks' editor-in-chief from February until June 1969, talked about the magazine during her appearance in the Rockovnik documentary series:

Back then, the things we did in that magazine—publishing a photo of a bunch of shaggy-haired guys on the cover, writing about foreign musicians, publishing entire issues without mentioning a single Yugoslav singer, publishing sheet music along with English language lyrics so that local Yugoslav bands could cover those songs easier—were considered to be borderline scandalous in Yugoslavia [...] It was pretty revolutionary and unusual... The inaugural issue with the Rolling Stones on the front cover sold out immediately. The day after its release, you couldn't find the issue anywhere on the market. There was a big hunger and need for those sorts of magazines.

The magazine's circulation was 100,000 copies; in comparison, the circulation of all youth magazines published by Yugoslav university organizations (for about 150,000 university students Yugoslavia had at the time) was about 80,000.

Alongside news, interviews and reviews, the magazine published record charts from the United States, United Kingdom, France and Italy, later joined by Dutch, Belgian, Norwegian and Brazilian charts, and on several occasions the magazine published charts from the Philippines and Singapore. During the first three years of the magazine's run, posters of foreign and domestic stars as well as flexi discs featuring international rock hits of the day were often distributed with the magazine. The discs were published in cooperation with the Jugoton record label, which at the time had a licence contract with EMI. The first in the series of flexi discs, featuring the Rolling Stones song "Have You Seen Your Mother, Baby, Standing in the Shadow?", appeared with the tenth issue of the magazine. Džuboks also advertised Western radio stations (publishing their frequencies and program) and music magazines (publishing information about ways of ordering them). Following the release of the thirteenth issue, the magazine celebrated its anniversary with a concert held in Belgrade's Trade Union Hall, featuring the most popular Yugoslav bands of the time. At the time, the magazine also got the club of its readers; every Sunday afternoon, Džuboks readers would meet in Belgrade Youth Center, discussing the articles and listening to new releases covered by the magazine.

After the 39th issue, released in June 1969, Duga stopped publishing the magazine. In March 1970, Duga launched Novi Džuboks (New Džuboks). Although the magazine's name referred to its predecessor, Novi Džuboks was essentially a teen magazine, with texts about international and Yugoslav pop and film stars and television personalities, and was discontinued in July of the same year, after only five issues.

==== Mini Džuboks ====
Encouraged by the success of Džuboks, in the spring of 1968, Duga launched Mini Džuboks, which, beside music, covered other aspects of the entertainment industry, including film and fashion, also publishing puzzles and comical texts. The magazine was printed in black and white, in small format. Its first editor-in-chief was Sava Popović, and was succeeded by Višnja Marjanović. The first issue of Mini Džuboks was released on 9 May 1968. After the 33rd issue, released on 20 February 1969, Mini Džuboks was discontinued.

=== Re-launch: 1974–1986 ===
==== Ladin Džuboks (1974–1976) ====
In the summer of 1974, more than five years since the magazine's demise, the Dečje novine publishing company from Gornji Milanovac renewed Džuboks under the Ladin Džuboks (Lada's Džuboks) name as a supplement to the Lada women's magazine. Though the publisher was based in Gornji Milanovac, the magazine's newsroom was in Belgrade. The renewed publication's first issue appeared on 1 July 1974, featuring established film and television star Milena Dravić and rising pop star Zdravko Čolić on the cover. Now published under the Jugoslovenski muzički magazin (Yugoslav Music Magazine) slogan, the publication expanded its scope beyond just rock music, so that musical genres such as pop, jazz, and classical music also began to be covered. Additionally, adjacent artistic endeavors that fall under the category of literature, film, photography, and comics also found coverage.

==== Standalone publication (1976–1986) ====
By August 1976, the magazine appeared as an independent publication outside of Lada under just the Džuboks name. The first editor-in-chief was Vojkan Borisavljević, and he was followed by Radmilo "Lale" Mandić, Milisav Ćirović, Peca Popović and Branko Vukojević.

By the end of the decade, Dečje novine had started publishing music biographies as a part of Džuboks book series, publishing books on the Rolling Stones, Bob Dylan, Led Zeppelin, Elton John, and other artists. In late 1970s and early 1980s, Džuboks played a pivotal role in promoting acts of the exuberant Yugoslav new wave scene. Simultaneously, Džuboks published news from the British new wave and punk rock scene, coming from the magazine's London correspondent Saša Stojanović, who wrote under the pen name "Pankerton" ("Punkertone"). Owing to Stojanović and photographer Branislav "Brian" Rašić, Džuboks also published exclusive interviews with British rock stars.

In March 1983, the magazine changed its format, appearing in tabloid size, and its frequency, appearing weekly. During 1983, Džuboks published the comic strip Patak Đoka (Đoka the Duck) by comic book artist Zoran Janjetov. After the 171st issue, released on 22 July 1983, the magazine was briefly discontinued. In early 1984, Džuboks resumed publishing once again, this time run by editor-in-chief Ljuba Trifunović. Eventually, Džuboks was finally discontinued in 1986, after the release of its 196th issue. After the final demise of Džuboks, most of its journalists moved to the competing magazine Rock.

== Journalists and contributors ==
=== 1966–1969 ===
Journalists and contributors to original Džuboks include:

- Arlette Ambrozič Paić
- Ranko Antonić
- Nenad Dukić
- Davor Futović
- Goran Kobali
- Nenad Kostić
- Miroslav Levicki
- Boris Milovac
- Borislav "Buca" Mitrović
- Toni Nardić
- Nikola Nešković
- Đurđa Paleček
- Aleksandar Pasternjak
- Raša Petrović
- Aleksandar Stojković
- Darko Šarenac
- Ivo Štrakl
- Čedomir Urošević (photographs)
- Mile Valčić
- Pavle Werner

=== 1974–1986 ===
Journalists and contributors to Džuboks from its relaunch to its disconitunation include:

- Predrag Aćimović
- Ognjen Alujević (photographs)
- Željko Antonić
- Zdenko Bakić
- Ivan Balent "Tratinčica"
- Predrag Bambić
- Ante Batinović
- Miroslav Begović
- Ranko Bošković
- Ljiljana Budić
- Davor Butković
- Slobodan Cicmil
- Mitja Ciuha
- Jelka Cvetinović
- Marina Cvetinović
- Vida Crnčević
- Milisav Ćirović
- Maksa Ćatović
- Veljko Despot
- Nedeljko Despotović
- Ljubomir Dimitrov
- Tomaž Domicelj
- Laslo Dorman (photographs)
- Vladimir Drajzel
- Rajko Dvizac
- Bora Đorđević
- Slobodan Đurđević
- Milan Đurić
- Predrag Đurić
- Saša Gajović
- Zlatko Gall
- Dragan Galović
- Darko Glavan
- Miroslav Gruić
- Ernest Gubicki
- Dragoljub Ilić
- Slobodan Ilić
- Svetolik Jakovljević
- Petar Jakonić
- Marko Janković
- Petar Janjatović
- Zoran Janjetov (comic)
- Dragan Jelić
- Nikola Jeremenko
- Olivera Jovanović
- Vladan Jovanović
- Zoran Jovanović
- Bora Kačić
- Todor Karamitičevski
- Dušan Kojić
- Slobodan Konjović
- Borjan Kostić
- Karolj Kovač
- Dragan Kremer
- Radomir Krkić
- Miloš Krstić
- Vesna Lalović
- Dušan Latković
- Marko Lopušina
- Petar Luković
- Irena Lukšić
- Biljana Maksić
- Veselin Maldaner
- Goran Marić
- Milomir Marić
- Mića Marković
- Željko Marušić
- Zoran Marinković
- Goranka Matić (photographs)
- Aljoša Milačić (photographs)
- Bratimir Minić
- Milomir Niketić
- Boro Ninković
- Vladimir Novak
- Nebojša Pajkić
- Josif Pavlović
- Mirko Pavošević
- Nevenko Petrić
- Bogdan F. Popović
- Milan Popov
- Petar "Peca" Popović
- Predrag Popović
- Saša Radojević
- Momčilo Rajin
- Saša Rakezić
- Branislav "Brian" Rašić (photographs)
- Nano Ružin
- Predrag Simović (photographs)
- Vitomir Simurdić
- Zlatko Srkalović
- Dragan S. Stefanović (graphic design)
- Saša Stojanović "Pankerton"
- Srđan Stojanović
- Saša Strižak
- Vojo Šindolić
- Siniša Škarica
- Gordan Škondrić
- Zoran Škugor
- Milan Todorović (photographs)
- Ljuba Trifunović
- Slobodan Trbojević
- Dinko Tucaković
- Ognjen Tvrtković
- Goran Vejvoda
- Vican Vicanović (photographs)
- Husein Vladović
- Đorđe Vojvodić
- Dražen Vrdoljak
- Radovan Vujović
- Branko Vukojević
- Mladen Vukmir
- Mladen Vuković
- Siniša Zdravković
- Aleksandar Žikić
- Ljubinko Živković

== Džuboks internet archive ==
In 2004, the online magazine Popboks was founded, containing a digitalized archive of Džuboks issues released between 1974 and 1985.

== Legacy ==
In her book Koka-kola socijalizam Radina Vučetić wrote about the first incarnation of Džuboks:

The covers of Džuboks printed in color, its gift posters and records were meant to indicate the Yugoslav high standard [of living] and to demonstrate both to the East and the West the special version of Yugoslav modernity, openness and liberalism. [...] The Western influences were visible on Džuboks covers, featuring color photographs of the Rolling Stones, the Beatles, Donovan, the Mamas and Papas, Sonny and Cher, Cliff Richard..., but also in interviews with leading American and British stars, in texts on their lives, in English language lyrics and sheet music... As—according to the memories of the contemporaries—only a small number of Yugoslav rockers at the time spoke English, all of that made a contribution in raising the domestic rock 'n' roll to a higher level.

In the 2026 documentary series Titova Jugoslavija (Tito's Yugoslavia), journalist, music critic and former Džuboks editor Petar "Peca" Popović stated:

Nikola Karaklajić, in the first week of May [1966], founded Džuboks. In color! Hear what I'm telling you. In color. That was the first magazine dedicated to this type of music. A magazine in color. Americans like to boast that they had Crawdaddy two months earlier; that was not really a magazine, that was a stencil duplicated print. Nikola made the first magazine of the kind [in the world]. Later you had Best in France, you had Circus in America two months later. But Rolling Stone, the most important [rock music] magazine, only came out seventeen months later. Džuboks came out with a circulation of 100,000, and three days later you could not buy it anywhere. The first issue of Rolling Stone was printed in San Francisco, 40,000 copies, 8,000 copies sold.

In 2017, Serbian news magazine Nedeljnik proclaimed the 1974 re-launch of Džuboks one of 100 Events that Changed Serbia.
