= Ninja (comic book) =

- Ninja on the cover of the 487th issue of Eks almanah.

Publication information
- Publisher: Dečje novine
- First appearance: 1986
- Created by: Branko Nikolić (character)

In-story information
- Alter ego: Leslie Eldridge
- Partnerships: Sumiko, Tabasco Pete
- Abilities: Ninjitsu, strength, agility, martial arts, use of katana, sixth sense

Ninja (Serbian: Ninđa or Nindža) was a Yugoslav comic strip published by Dečje novine. Created in 1986, it was based on the series of pulp novels of the same name written by Yugoslav writer Brana Nikolić.

== Creation and publication history ==
Comics and pulp novels were very popular in former Yugoslavia – from 1971 to 1981, 11,611 issues were printed, a total of 717 million copies in the country of 22 million people. Following the chopsocky craze, comics and pulp novels about ninjas gained popularity in Yugoslavia. In 1982, writer Aleksandar Obradović and artists Branislav Kerac (pencil) and Branko Plavšić (ink) created a ninja character named Fred Nolan, who debuted in the 40th issue of the comic magazine YU strip, published by Dečje novine. The second episode of the comic came out in issue #56 in 1983, this time written by Svetozar Obradović. In 1983, Dečje novine also started publishing pulp novels from the Ninja Master series, written by American writer Richard Meyers. Six Meyers' stories were published before Dečje novine entrusted Yugoslav writer Brana Nikolić with the creation of new ninja stories. Nikolić, writing under the pen name Derek Finegan, created a hero named Leslie Eldridge, who debuted in the story entitled "Washington, D.C.", published as the continuation of Meyers' series. From 1983 to 1998, more than 150 stories were published, gaining huge popularity.

Leslie Eldridge debuted in comics in 1986, in the 485th issue of the comic magazine Eks almanah, also published by Dečje novine. From 1986 to 1989, 28 black-and-white stories were published (some of them in sequels), most of them written by Svetozar Obradović, Dragan Stokić Rajački "Rajac" and Petar Aladžić and drawn by Stokić Rajački and Miodrag "Mikica" Ivanović. The only episodes not created by the mentioned artists were episodes "Ninja protiv jakuza ("Ninja vs. Yakuza", published in the 513th issue of Eks almanah), which was written by Miodrag Krstić and drawn by his brother Vladimir Krstić, and the last episode of the comic, "U ime starog prijateljstva" ("In the Name of the Old Friendship"), which was signed by Branislav Kerac and Sibin Slavković.

The Ninja comic ended when Eks almanah magazine folded with 538th issue, due to the collapse of the Yugoslav economy.

In 1991, Ninđa sticker album was published. The album was essentially a comic album, with stickers filling in empty panels. The comic was signed by Kerac, Slavković and Plavšić.

In 2019, Serbian publisher Forma B published a comic album with the collection of Ninja episodes drawn by Miodrag Ivanović. In 2021 and 2025, Cultural Center Zoran Radmilović from Zaječar published three collections by Rajački.

== Fictional character ==
In Brana Nikolić's pulp novels, the titular hero named Leslie Eldridge (Serbian: Lesli Eldridž) is a ninja based in San Francisco. Other characters include his lover Sumiko and best friend Tabasco Pete. However, in comics Leslie usually acts alone and only occasionally teams-up with Sumiko, a ninja herself. In episode "Povratak iz mrtvih" ("Back from the Dead") (written by Obradović and published in 1987 in the 490th issue of Eks almanah), it was revealed that the Ninja's birth name was actually Dick Flanders. Left for dead, Dick returned from Japan as a ninja and got his revenge on his brother, who had tried to murder him. With a new name, he became a masked vigilante, fighting American mobsters, human traffickers and foreign warlords, but also demons, cyborgs and other ninja.

== List of episodes ==
All episodes were published in Eks almanah:

- "Gospodar zla" ("Master of Evil") (created by Dragan Stokić Rajački, published in issue #485)
- "Paklena noć" ("Hell of a Night") (created by Dragan Stokić Rajački, published in issue #486)
- "Klan Tomosuke" ("Tomosuke Clan") (created by Dragan Stokić Rajački, published in issue #487)
- "Duh planine Đotaro" ("Ghost of the Jotaro Mountain") (created by Dragan Stokić Rajački, published in sequels in issues #488 and 489)
- "Povratak iz mrtvih" ("Back from the Dead") (created by Svetozar Obradović, Miodrag Ivanović and, Predrag Ivanović, published in issue #490)
- "Novi saveznik" ("New Ally") (created by Svetozar Obradović and Miodrag Ivanović, published in issue #491)
- "Neuspela osveta" ("Failed Revenge") (created by Svetozar Obradović and Miodrag Ivanović, published in issue #492)
- "Policajci" ("Policemen") (created by Svetozar Obradović and Miodrag Ivanović, published in issue #493)
- "Vraćeno pamćenje" ("Memory Returns") (created by Svetozar Obradović and Miodrag Ivanović, published in issue #494)
- "Skinute maske" ("Masks Taken Off") (created by Svetozar Obradović and Miodrag Ivanović, published in issue #495)
- "Kamakura" (created by Svetozar Obradović and Miodrag Ivanović, published in issue #496)
- "U carstvu podzemlja" ("In the Empire of the Underground") (created by Petar Aladžić, Miodrag Ivanović and Predrag Ivanović, published in issue #497)
- "Mrtvac koji hoda"("Dead Man Walking") (created by Svetozar Obradović and Dragan Stokić Rajački, published in issue #498)
- "Susret sa klovnom" ("Encounter with the Clown") (created by Svetozar Obradović and Dragan Stokić Rajački, published in issue #499)
- "Kad sunce udari u glavu" ("Sunstroke") (created by Svetozar Obradović and Dragan Stokić Rajački, published in sequels in issues #500, 501 and 502)
- "Nepobedivi Danijel" ("The Invincible Daniel") (created by Svetozar Obradović and Dragan Stokić Rajački, published in sequels in issues #507 and 508)
- "Dah pustinje" ("Breath of the Desert") (created by Dragan Stokić Rajački, published in sequels in issues #510 and 511)
- "Ninja protiv jakuza" ("Ninja vs. Yakuza") (created by Vladimir Krstić and Miodrag Krstić, published in issue #513)
- "Demoni ipak postoje" ("Demons Do Exist") (created by Dragan Stokić Rajački, published in sequels in issues #514, 515 and 516)
- "Paklena kutija" ("Hell Box") (created by Dragan Stokić Rajački, published in sequels in issues #519 and 520)
- "Ukus smrti" ("The Taste of Death") (created by Dragan Stokić Rajački, published in issue #521)
- "Veliki dan malog muvca" ("The Big Day of the Little Fly") (created by Dragan Stokić Rajački, published in issue #521)
- "Senka pravde" ("Shadow of Justice") (created by Svetozar Obradović and Miodrag Ivanović, published in issue #522)
- "Noćni letač" ("Night Flyer") (created by Svetozar Obradović, Predrag Ivanović and Miodrag Ivanović, published in issue #523)
- "Krvavi lov" ("Blood Hunt") (created by Svetozar Obradović and Miodrag Ivanović, published in sequels in issues #524 and 525)
- "Pljačka u kockarnici" ("Casino Robbery") (created by Branislav Peterman and Miodrag Ivanović, published in issue #528)
- "Sinovi velikog zmaja" ("Sons of the Great Dragon") (created by Dragan Stokić Rajački, published in sequels in issue #531, 532, 533 and 534)
- "U ime starog prijateljstva" ("In the Name of the Old Friendship") (created by Branislav Kerac and Sibin Slavković, published in issue #538)

== See also ==
- Lun, kralj ponoći
