= Sibin Slavković =

Serbian comic book artist, illustrator and editor (born 1953)

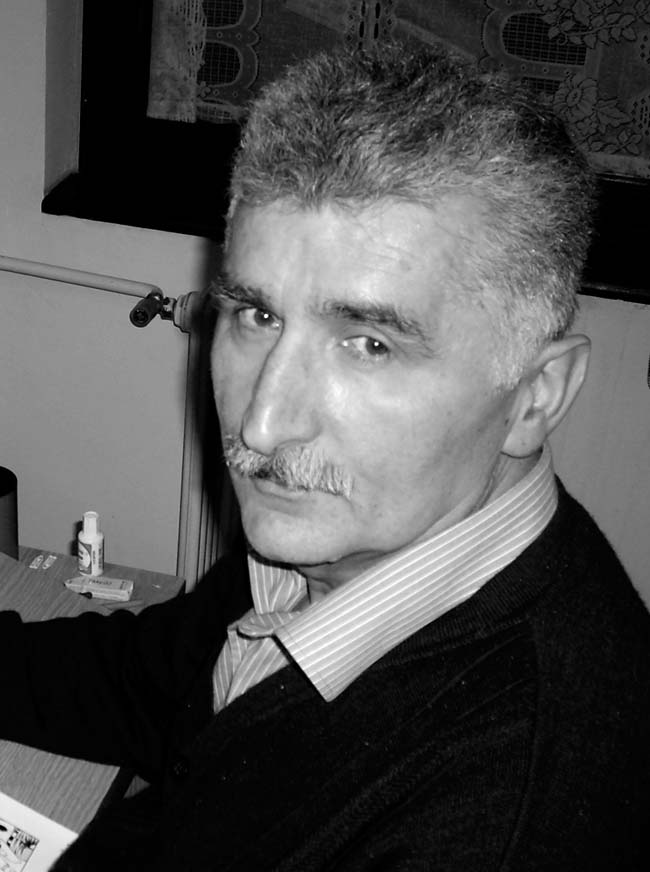
- Sibin Slavković at work
- Born: 1953 (age 72–73) Žunjevići, Serbia, Yugoslavia
- Areas: Writer, penciller, colorist, editor, illustrator
- Pseudonyms: Sibin, S. Žunjević
- Notable works: Tarzan, Il Grande Blek, Tex

Sibin Slavković (born 1953 in Žunjevići, Yugoslavia) is a Serbian comic book artist, illustrator and editor.

== Early life ==
Sibin Slavković was born in Žunjevići (Yugoslavia, presently Serbia). His family moved to Starčevo when he was six. His brothers are both painters.

Slavković became interested in comics reading Radivoj Bogičević's Akant and Arturo del Castillo's Larrigan.

== Career ==
Since making a debut in Politikin Zabavnik magazine in 1973, Slavković worked as a comic book writer and artist for major Yugoslav publishers such as Dečje novine, Dnevnik and Forum, often in collaboration with Branislav Kerac and Svetozar Obradović. His credits include licensed titles such as Tarzan, Il Grande Blek and Ninja.

In the 1990s, Slavković turned to foreign publishers, doing the coloring work for Joe Kubert and Hermann Huppen. His comics have been published in the United States, France, Germany, Scandinavia and former Yugoslavia. He was the editor of seminal publications such as YU strip (1979–1983) and Stripoteka (1999–2016).

== Personal life ==
He has lived with his family in Novi Sad since 1983.

== Bibliography ==
=== Artist ===
- Il Grande Blek
- Tarzan
- Ninja
- The Mask: Toys in the Attic
- Stormy & Iceberg

=== Colorist ===
- Tex
- Docteur Mystère
- Abraham Stone: The Revolution
- Comanche: The Prisoner
- Just Imagine Stan Lee Creating Batman

== See also ==
- List of comics creators
- List of Serbian artists
- List of Serbian writers
