= Kobra (comic book) =

Publication information
- Publisher: Dečje novine
- First appearance: 1979
- Created by: Branislav Kerac (artist); Svetozar Obradović (writer)

In-story information
- Partnerships: Cindy Williams
- Abilities: Excellent athlete, highly skilled martial artist

Kobra (trans. Cobra) was a Yugoslav comic book created by artist Branislav Kerac and writer Svetozar Obradović. The main character of the comic is a young stunt man, nicknamed Kobra.

== History ==
After ending their cooperation with publisher Dnevnik, artist Branislav Kerac and writer Svetozar Obradović started to cooperate with the publisher Dečje novine. Their first comic published by Dečje novine was Kobra, a comic about a young stunt man nicknamed Kobra. Kobra was first published in Dečje novine's comic magazine YU strip in 1979. Seventeen issues were published, before Kerac dropped his work on Kobra to work on Cat Claw.

=== List of episodes ===
1. "Sam protiv svih" ("Alone Against Everyone")
2. "Nezgodni svedoci" ("Troublesome Witnesses")
3. "Zavera u Fuentesu" ("Conspiracy in Fuentes")
4. "Biznis je biznis" ("Business Is Business")
5. "Ostrvo" ("The Island")
6. "Stari traper" ("Old Trapper")
7. "Ratna kraljica" ("War Queen")
8. "Treće poluvreme" ("The Third Half")
9. "Čovek sa dva života" ("A Man with Two Lives")
10. "Žizel" ("Gisele")
11. "Neman moraš ubiti dvaput" ("Monster Has to Be Killed Twice")
12. "Morske radosti" ("Joys of the Sea")
13. "Zmajevi spašavaju princezu" ("The Dragons Save the Princess")
14. "Anđeo pakla" ("Angel of Hell")
15. "Pustinjski monstrum" ("Desert Monster")
16. "Papan"
17. "Arizona Heat"

== Fictional character ==
The main character of the comic is a young Yugoslav Slobodan Marković, nicknamed Kobra. Kobra is a stunt man, a martial artist and an adventurer. Kobra's adversaries include the mafia, drug dealers, blackmailers, killers and even Marvel Universe-like supervillain War Queen. In later episodes, Kobra got a partner named Cindy Williams.
