= Il Grande Blek =

Blek

Publication information
- Publisher: Editoriale Dardo
- First appearance: 1954
- Created by: EsseGesse

In-story information
- Alter ego: Yannick Leroc
- Partnerships: Roddy, Occultis
- Abilities: Strength, marksmanship

Il Grande Blek is an Italian Western comic book, first published in Italy on October 3, 1954, by Editoriale Dardo. Blek was written and illustrated by Giovanni Sinchetto, Dario Guzzon and Pietro Sartoris, a trio also known as EsseGesse.

== Fictional character ==
Blek is the leader of a group of trappers during the American Revolutionary War, who fight against the cruel Redcoats, the symbol of British colonialist oppression. Blek's best friends and allies are his stepson Roddy Lassiter and Professor Cornelius Occultis. Although not present in every episode, lawyer Connoly, the leader of American revolutionaries in Boston, is another prominent character. Benjamin Franklin also made occasional appearances.

== Publication history ==
=== Italy ===
The prototype of the character was published in another comic called Il Piccolo Trapper in 1953, inspired by the works of Fenimore Cooper and Zane Grey. The blonde giant appeared a year later. From 1954 to 1967, 654 strips were published in the Collana Araldo series. In its heyday, the strip boasted a weekly circulation of 400,000. However, the authors moved on to create Comandante Mark after a financial disagreement with the original publisher in 1965.

In addition to Italy, Blek was reprinted in other countries such as Greece (as Μπλεκ), Turkey (as Teksas, Çelik Blek), France (as Blek le Roc), and former Yugoslavia (as Veliki Blek). The Slovenian national minority in Italy was introduced to Blek in Slovene in 1959 (as Silni Tom, meaning Tough Tom); the Slovenian translation was changed to Veliki Blek in the 1990s. In Scandinavia, he was called Davy Crockett, although he has nothing to do with the historical figure.

=== France ===
Carlo Cedroni, Nicola Del Principe and many others continued the production for Éditions Lug, while the list of French authors included Jean-Yves Mitton and André Amouriq. The title peaked at 300,000 copies. Blek also received a revamped origin; writer Marcel Navarro revealed "Blek" means "Golden Hair" in the language of Native Americans, but that he was born Yannick Leroc in Saint-Malo, France on November 27, 1749.

=== Yugoslavia ===
In former Yugoslavia, Blek was published in the Lunov magnus strip and Strip zabavnik series. The character reached the print run of 100,000, so in 1978 the local publisher (Dnevnik from Novi Sad) decided to produce its own licensed material, colloquially known as YU Blek. The writers were Petar Aladžić, Predrag Ivanović, Miodrag Milanović, Ivica Mitrović and Svetozar Obradović. The list of artists included Stevan Brajdić, Milorad Žarić, Miodrag Ivanović, Predrag Ivanović, D. Ivković, Branislav Kerac, Bojan Kerzan, Pavel Koza, Vladimir Krstić, Spasoje Kulauzov, Marinko Lebović, B. Ljubičić, Stevo Maslek, Nikola Maslovara, Radič Mijatović, Željko Mitrović, Ahmet Muminović, Slavko Pejak, Dušan Pivac, Branko Plavšić, Zdravko Popović, Sibin Slavković (pen name "S. Žunjević"), Ljubomir Filipov and Adam Čurdinjaković. More than 70 episodes were produced, including a sticker album.

=== Greece ===
In Greece, it was journalist and comic writer Stelios Anemodouras (1917 - 2000) who first published Il Grande Blek stories on a weekly basis for almost 25 years (1969 - 1994). He, then continued the Blek edition on a monthly basis, until 2011 when his publishing house titled "Periodikos Typos" (by his son, Giorgos Anemodouras) ended its operating. From 2014 Stelios Anemodouras' grandson, Leokratis Anemodouras has been publishing the new Blek magazine ("ΜΠΛΕΚ, τα Καλύτερα Κόμικς" by "Mikros Iros" Co), today on a 2montly basis. During the 70s, Stelios Anemodouras along with illustrator Byron Aptosoglou (1923 - 1990) created 8 new Il Grande Blek stories, which were published, mainly in the Μεγάλος ΜΠΛΕΚ mag. New Greek stories by writers Nikos D. Nikolaidis and Giorgos Pol. Papadakis, illustrated by comic artist Kostas Fragiadakis, were published both in Greek and Italian editions, a few years ago.

== Influence ==
The strip inspired Il Grande Blek, a 1987 film directed by Giuseppe Piccioni about a boy who loves comics.
