= Cat Claw =

Publication information
- Publisher: Dečje novine Eternity Comics
- First appearance: June 1981
- Created by: Branislav Kerac (artist); Svetozar Obradović (writer)

In-story information
- Alter ego: Carol Connor
- Partnerships: Cameron Hill
- Abilities: Cat's agility, claw-like fingernails, superhuman strength, night vision

Cat Claw is a comic book superhero created by Serbian artist Branislav Kerac and writer Svetozar Obradović.

== History ==
In the early 1980s, the publisher Dečje novine and editor Sibin Slavković called for comic strips that would resemble American superhero comics for their magazine YU Strip. Of the creators solicited, only Branislav Kerac and Svetozar Obradović responded. Their suggestions included Gea, a Red Sonja-type character, Cyborg, a Terminator-type character, and Cat Claw, a female version of Spider-Man. Kerac stated in a 1991 interview: "I tried to imagine what the wet dream of every male pig would look like, and Cat Claw was the answer". Kerac penciled several pages and they were shopped around the Belgrade inkers, but most of them disliked the concept of the comic. Kerac ended up performing both duties. He was busy with his Kobra comic book, so one of the characters had to be dropped. Kerac chose to retain Cat Claw, which allowed him to emulate the work of one of his idols, John Romita, Sr.. The first episode, "Bane Claws", written by Obradović, was very much in the Marvel Comics style. It even included a cameo appearance of Peter Parker. Soon after, Obradović, due to various obligations, had to drop his work on Cat Claw. After a short cooperation with writer Slavko Draginčić, Kerac became the complete author of the comic As a writer, Kerac started to incorporate humor and allusions to various films, other comics and rock music, mostly heavy metal, into stories, which led some readers and critics to view Cat Claw as a parody of superhero comics.

In 1995, Kerac drew the 44th and last Cat Claw episode.

In 1989, Strip Art Features started distributing Cat Claw on the foreign market. Cat Claw was translated and published in USA, France, Netherlands, Sweden, Norway, and Turkey. Malibu Comics's imprint Eternity Comics republished 9 issues of Cat Claw's adventures. The beginning of the Yugoslav Wars prevented a more successful breakthrough of the comic on the foreign market.

In 2006, Cat Claw was published in hardcover albums as Cat Claw Ultimate Collection.

== Fictional character ==
Carol Connor, an introverted university biology student, was scratched by a cat which had been used in an experiment. Later that same evening, when she attempted to shut down an experiment in Dr. Baker's lab she was exposed to "Sigma radiation". As a result, Carol found she had developed a cat's agility and claw-like fingernails. She was also superhumanly strong and could see in the dark almost as well as during the day.

At first, Carol just used her powers for her own amusement, but when she heard her roommate Gene Jones (called GJ or Dži-Džej in Serbian transliteration) being attacked outside their apartment building, she jumped to her defense and drove the attackers off. Carol enjoyed the experience and decided to create a costumed identity. Carol "borrowed" some special fabric, woven from metal, to create her mask, gloves and boots, from the Gray's Institute. There was insufficient fabric to create a complete costume, so Carol used a black bikini Gene had given her (but she had never dared to wear) and fishnet pantyhose. The ordinary fabric of the bikini and hose got torn up and had to be replaced after every fight. Later, Carol adopted a black leotard and black leather jacket to replace the bikini.

Cat Claw went on to battle ordinary criminals and her own rogues gallery: Xtremity (aka Renata Roseblood), Berthold Schwartzenberger (aka Catminator and, later, Grgur the Monster), Dr. Sigismund Morse (Grgur's creator), Dr. Bruce Baker (who also turns into a monster), Ninja Deathbringer, and the Helloweeners.

== TV film ==
In 1992, as part of a Radio Television of Serbia show about Bane Kerac, a short film based on Cat Claw, City Cat, was recorded. The film was directed by Miša Milošević, and featured actress Danijela Pejić as Carol and Kerac himself as policeman Cameron Hill.

== Theater ==
In 2022, a theater play based on Cat Claw had its premiere at the Youth Theatre. The play was directed by Michael Helmerhorst and co-adapted with Henri Overduin as a cooperation between European and local artists for the European Capital of Culture program held in Novi Sad that year. The original script draft was first written in English, then translated into Serbian. The lead role of Carol Connor/Cat Claw was played by Ivana Vukčević. Other actors and performers were Slobodan Ninković (Cameron Hill), Saša Latinović (Bullet), Miloš Macura (MacDonald), Jelica Gligorin (Cartland), Slavica Vučetić (Gene Jones), Neda Danilović (Xtremity), Aleksa Ilić (Schwartzenberger, drums), Nenad J. Popović (double role), Darko Radojević (keyboard), Dejan Šarković (drums), Vlada Janković (guitar) and Jelena Radić (bass guitar).

== In other media ==
Cover of GeroMetal's 1996 album Cat Claw.

Cat Claw was the name of the 1996 album by Novi Sad heavy metal band GeroMetal, in which Kerac played the drums. Cover art was designed by Kerac and featured Cat Claw.

== See also ==
- Catwoman
- Black Canary
