= Rock (magazine) =

Yugoslav music magazine

- Cover of the 15th issue of Rock 82, featuring Grace Jones
- Categories: Music magazine
- Frequency: Weekly
- Publisher: NIP Politika
- Founded: 1982
- First issue: April 1982
- Final issue: 13 December 1990
- Country: Yugoslavia
- Language: Serbian

Rock was a Yugoslav music magazine, published from 1982 to 1990. Initially named Rock 82, and published as a supplement of comic magazine Strip 82 in an unusual 11x30cm format, the magazine soon became a standalone publication under the name Rock. With a circulation of 100,000, Rock was, alongside Džuboks, Yugoslavia's most prominent music magazine during the 1980s. In 1988, the magazine changed its name to Pop Rock, and was finally discontinued in December 1990, two months prior to the first armed conflicts on the territory of Yugoslavia.

== History ==
=== Rock 82 (1982) ===
Rock first appeared in April 1982 as Rock 82. Initially, Rock 82 was a supplement of NIP Politika's comic magazine Strip 82, the back cover of Strip 82 being the front cover of Rock 82 and vice versa, printed in an unusual 11x30cm magazine format, appearing on the newsstands every Wednesday. Rock 82's first editor-in-chief as well as its initiator was rock critic Petar "Peca" Popović. In an interview for the Rockovnik documentary series, Popović recalled:

I believed that the generation that had already been introduced to MTV, [...] the generation of young, curious people that had already witnessed the video killing the radio star, deserved a bit of a different magazine. A publication that's a bit more visual, a magazine with a different sensibility, featuring a different generation of authors, just as Džuboks in the 1970s had a great generation of talented and brave writers. I believed that there were more people who, unfortunately, weren't being published. It turned out they were good too.

=== Rock (1982–1988) ===
The magazine began being published as an independent periodical with its 50th issue. Printed in tabloid newspaper format, the first independent issue appeared on 29 December 1982.

Popović was succeeded as editor-in-chief by Vladislav Bajac, who in turn got succeeded by Dragan Todorović. The magazine published, alongside interviews with Yugoslav musicians and international artists touring Yugoslavia, exclusive interviews and photographs of British music stars by the magazine's London corespondents Svetislav Stojanović and Branislav "Brian" Rašić. The magazine featured columns by veteran rock singers Dušan Prelević and Branko Marušić "Čutura". In March 1985, Rock started getting printed in magazine format.

The magazine played a pivotal role in YU Rock Misija, a Yugoslav contribution to Live Aid campaign. The 7-inch single with the charity song "Za milion godina", recorded by top acts of the Yugoslav rock scene, was distributed with the 75th issue of Rock magazine, published on 22 May 1985. The issue was printed in 150,000 copies, thus the initial number of the singles sold was 150,000.

With the 1986 discontinuation of another Yugoslav music magazine, Džuboks, most of its journalists moved to Rock.

=== Pop Rock (1988–1990) ===
From October 1988, the magazine was edited by Saša Gajević, and published under the name Pop Rock. With the new name, the magazine got a new graphic design and concept, publishing, alongside texts on music, articles on fashion and popular culture in general, as well as puzzles. With the launch of the teen magazine Ćao in December 1988, a number of Rock contributors moved to the new publication. The last, 161st issue of Pop Rock was released on 13 December 1990.

== Journalists and contributors ==
Journalists and contributors to Rock include:

- Sunčica Aćimović
- Lidija Antonini
- Željko Antović
- Rade Apostolac
- Marta Arsenijević
- Vladislav Bajac
- Zorica Bajin Đukanović (photographs)
- Rešan Beničanin
- Mirjana Blagojević
- Suzana Bogdanović
- Aneta Bogetić
- Zak Bošnjak
- Slobodan Cicmil
- Dejan Cukić
- Goran Cvetić
- Erol ČolaKović (photographs)
- Saša Damnjanović
- Milan Đurica (photographs)
- Nikola Emeri
- Vojislav Flegar
- Zlatko Gall
- Vanja Gavrovski
- Dragan Gojković
- Snežana Golubović
- Rade Gruić
- Ivan Ivačković
- Zoran Ivanović (photographs)
- Jadranka Janković
- Petar Janjatović
- Slavka Jovanović
- Dragan Kenić
- Boro Kokan
- Slobodan Konjović
- Gordana Kostić
- Ivica Kovačević (photographs)
- Nebojša Kovačević
- Dragan Kremer
- Rade Krstinić
- Branimir Lokner
- Petar Luković
- Zoran Mačejan
- Ivana Marković
- Zoran Marković
- Branko Marušić "Čutura"
- Snežana Mastilović
- Goranka Matić (photographs)
- Tatjana Mihajlović
- Vukica Mikača
- Robert Nemeček
- Zorica Nikolić
- Bane Obradović
- Mirjana Ognjanović
- Vladimir Ostojić
- Kamenko Pajić (photographs)
- Vojislav Pantić
- Vlado Pandža
- Deana Pataković
- Ivana Pataković
- Vladan Paunović
- Velibor Pedevski
- Tanja Petrović
- Peca Popović
- Zvezdana Popović
- Zoran Predić
- Dušan Prelević
- Aleksandar Prstojević
- Slobodan Purić (photographs)
- Nebojša Radosavljević
- Dubravka Rajh
- Sandra Rančić
- Valentina Rapajić
- Branislav "Brian" Rašić (photographs)
- Milan Rašić (photographs)
- Marko Rakić (photographs)
- Žikica Simić
- Vladimir Stakić
- Biljana Stanojević
- Željko Stefanović
- Jovan Stojanović
- Svetislav Stojanović
- Bojan Stojnić
- Dragan Stošić
- Voja Šindolić
- Suzana Trbarić
- Zoran Trbović (photographs)
- Ljubo Trifunović
- David Vartabedijan
- Goran Vejvoda (photographs)
- Dušan Vesić
- Aleksandar Žikić
