= Vladimir Krstić =

Vladimir Krstić may refer to:

- Vladimir Krstić (basketball) (born 1972), Croatian basketball coach and player
- Vladimir Krstić (comics) (born 1959), Serbian comic book and graphic novel creator, painter and illustrator
- Vladimir Krstić (rower) (born 1959), Yugoslav rower
- Vladimir Krstić (footballer) (born 1987), Serbian footballer
