= H. M. Baker =

Serbian artist

H.M. Baker is a pseudonym of Branislav Kerac, a comic book artist from Serbia. He first used this pen name in a short Western story in 1976.

Credits in American comics include The Black Pearl and Ghost for Dark Horse Comics.

Baker is known for a "clean" style, evocative of John Romita, Sr.
