= Svetozar Obradović =

Serbian writer (1950–2020)

- Born: 12 November 1950 Novi Sad, Socialist Republic of Serbia
- Died: 15 August 2020 (aged 69) Novi Sad, Serbia
- Area: comic book writer
- Notable works: Lieutenant Tara, Cat Claw, Tarzan, Kobra, Il Grande Blek, Lun, kralj ponoći, Billy The Spit, Ninja

Svetozar Obradović Toza (12 November 1950 – 15 August 2020) was a Serbian writer, best known for his comic books. He also wrote articles, essays, stories, books and radio dramas.

== Professional career ==
Obradović debuted with Lieutenant Tara in the Yugoslav Zlatni kliker magazine in 1975. The titular hero was named and loosely based on his uncle, who fought as a Partisan in World War II. The comic was drawn by Obradović's childhood friend, Branislav Kerac. The duo went on to create Kobra and Cat Claw, two of the most popular Yugoslav books in the 1980s. Obradović also worked with different artists on licensed properties such as Tarzan and Blek as well as Ninja and Lun, kralj ponoći, based on the popular pulp novels. His work has been reprinted in the US, Germany, Scandinavia and the Netherlands.

== Personal life ==
Obradović's father was originally from Pljevlja (presently Montenegro) but moved to Novi Sad after World War II, where Obradović was born and lived with his wife and two daughters. He was also a basketball player and coach.

== Bibliography ==
=== Comics ===
- Lieutenant Tara (art by Branislav Kerac)
- Kobra (art by Branislav Kerac)
- Cat Claw (art by Branislav Kerac)
- Billy The Spit (art by Branislav Kerac)
- Troje nesalomljivih (art by Branislav Kerac)
- Blek (art by various)
- Lun, kralj ponoći (art by various)
- Izvidnik Rod (art by Jelko Peternelj)
- Kiki i Riki (art by Pavel Koza)
- Porodica Srećković (art by Sibin Slavković)
- Ninja (art by various)

=== Books ===
- Velike prevare i falsifikati
- Novosadski strip
