= Marko Lopušina =

Serbian journalist and publicist (born 1951)

Marko Lopušina (Марко Лопушина) (born 1951) is a Serbian journalist and publicist, known for writing a number of books on the Serbian diaspora, and also on secret services and their role in contemporary Serbian politics.

== Biography ==
Lopušina was born in Raška, Yugoslavia, present day Serbia. He finished primary school and secondary school in Brus and completed his undergraduate degree at the Faculty of Politics in the University of Belgrade.

He worked for the newspaper Sekundarne sirovine as a journalist and editor in 1976, for the paper Zdravo as a journalist in 1978, for the magazine Interview since 1981 as a journalist and editor, and since 1997 as the editor-in-chief. Then he became the editor of the magazine Profile. He was the Belgrade reporter of the newspaper Nedeljni telegraf until 2008.

He has been a contributor to many newspapers, including Politika, Ilustrovana Politika, Revija 92, TV Novosti, Dnevnik, Jedinstvo, TV Politika, Arena, Start, Penthouse from Belgrade, Novi Sad, Pristina and Zagreb.

Lopušina has authored over 50 books on the Serbian diaspora, emigration, the Serbian secret services and secret foreign diplomacies.

== Awards ==
- 2002: Laza Kostić Award for journalism
- 2004: Best journalist in Serbia, awarded by the Udruženje novinara Srbije (Association of Serbian Journalists)
- Included in the 2008-09 edition of Who is who in USA and Canada of the Library of Congress in Washington.

== Selected bibliography ==
=== Books ===
- Crna knjiga: cenzura u Jugoslaviji, 1945-91 (Belgrade: Fokus, 1991). ISBN 978-8-67613-005-4
- Ubij bližnjeg svog: Jugoslovenska tajna policija od 1945. do 1997 (Belgrade: Narodna Knjiga Alfa, 1997).
- KGB protiv Jugoslavije (Belgrade: Evro, 2000).
- CIA u Srbiju (Belgrade: Knjiga komerc, 2010). ISBN 978-8-67712-259-1
- Ubice u ime države (Novi Sad: Prometej, 2012). ISBN 978-8-65150-777-2
- Ubij bližnjeg svog: Jugoslovenska tajna policija. 1945–2002. (Belgrade: Marso, 2014). ISBN 978-8-66107-140-9
- Enciklopedija srpske dijaspore - Srbi u prekomorskim zemljama ( Sluzbeni glasnik, 2016) ISBN 978-8-65191-248-4
