= GeroMetal =

Serbian heavy metal band

- Origin: Novi Sad, Serbia, FR Yugoslavia
- Genres: Hard rock, heavy metal, comedy rock
- Years active: 1992 – 2000
- Labels: Explosive Records, ITMM
- Past members: Josip Sabo; Bane Kerac; Predrag Moldvaji; Dušan Uvalić; Viktor Moldvaji; Nenad Petković

GeroMetal (Serbian Cyrillic: ГероМетал) was a Serbian heavy metal band from Novi Sad.

== Band history ==
The band was formed by a former Griva member Josip Sabo (guitar) and a well-known comic book artist Bane Kerac (drums). The band started their activity in 1992, when Sabo and Kerac were joined by a former Albatorosi member Predrag "Peđa" Moldvaji (bass guitar). Initially, the band performed covers by Deep Purple, Led Zeppelin, Free, The Jimi Hendrix Experience and others, but with humorous Serbian language lyrics. These songs were released in 1993 on the album Der Rauch Am Wasser (German for "Smoke on the Water").

In 1996, the band was joined by vocalist Dušan Uvalić "Francuz", a former vocalist for the bands Annathema and Crash. This lineup recorded new songs, released during the same year on the album Cat Claw, named after the comic book superhero of the same name created by Kerac. In 1998, after a number of concerts across Vojvodina, Uvalić left GeroMetal to join the reformed Annathema, and two members of the band Kraj, Viktor Moldvaji (Predrag Moldvaji's son, guitar) and Nenad Petković (the bass guitarist in Kraj, on keyboards in GeroMetal), joined the band. Until the end of their career the band performed occasionally only, performing mostly in Novi Sad. In 2000, the band disbanded. The band members, without Kerac, formed the band High Risk.

== Discography ==
=== Studio albums ===
- Der Rauch Am Wasser (1993)
- Cat Claw (1996)
