= Irena Lukšić =

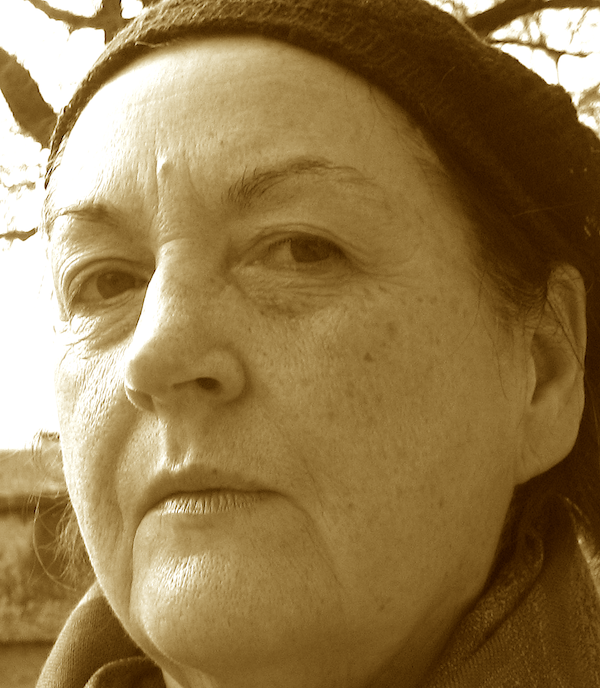
Irena Lukšić

Irena Lukšić (March 10, 1953 - March 11, 2019, Duga Resa) was a Croatian writer, translator, scholar and editor. She was born in a middle-class family, her mother Zora was an economist, and her father Zdenko an administrative lawyer. In her town of birth she completed her primary and secondary education, and she graduated in Comparative Literature and Russian Language from the Faculty of Philosophy at Zagreb University. She also studied journalism at the Faculty of Political Sciences in Zagreb She obtained her doctoral degree with a thesis on Russian emigrants' literature. Her first critical reviews were published in the mid-1970s, in a music magazine. At the time she started collaborating as translator with a number of editions of Vjesnik newspaper. Short stories published in various magazines in the late 1970s marked her literary debut. The year 1981 saw the publication of her first novel Hostel for Train-escorting Personnel, which the literary critics immediately included in the category of so-called prose in jeans, i.e. youthful rebellion against authority and social restrictions. The novel Seeking a Spoon and the collection of short stories Seven Stories or One Life may be said to belong to a similar stylistic formation, while the short-story collection Nights in White Satin (1995) is characterized by a postmodernist view on reality as a game in language. The novel Return of the Broken Arrow (2000), dealing with the war in Croatia, indicates a turn towards reality. Accordingly, the novel Celestial Cyclists (2008) is set in the 1960s and interspersed with documentary material from the sphere of pop-culture, and the book of travel prose Desperately Foreboding Cohen (2013) is based on cultural references important to the 20th century and the literary procédé typical of the adventure genre.

Essays have a special place in the oeuvre of Irena Lukšić. The texts interpret in a unique, almost poetic fashion the phenomena characteristic of the modern times: the culture of celebrities, travels, food and pets. Namely, the author inquires into the said phenomena through the prism of literary works published in the book-series "In the Wake of the Classics" (published in Zagreb as joint project of Croatian Philological Society and Disput), establishing a link with the general state of mind of the post-historical period, but also with her own biographical situation (Diaries, Dream Books, Dictionaries, 2009).

Irena Lukšić is a distinguished expert in Russian emigrants' literature and translator from the Russian language. She has received numerous prizes and awards for her work as artist, expert and translator.

== Works ==
- Konačište vlakopratnog osoblja, roman, CDD, Zagreb 1981.
- Zrcalo, roman za djecu, Mladost, Zagreb 1983.
- Sedam priča ili jedan život, pripovijetke, Revija Osijek 1986.
- Traženje žlice, roman, Izdavački centar Rijeka, Rijeka 1987.
- Noći u bijelom satenu, pripovijetke, Rival, Rijeka 1995.
- Nova ruska poezija; panorama novije ruske poezije, dvojezično, Hrvatsko filološko društvo, Zagreb 1998.
- Soc-art; zbornik tekstova, Hrvatsko filološko društvo Zagreb 1998.
- Jednostavna istina – ruska pripovijetka XX. stoljeća; panorama ruske pripovijetke, Rival, Rijeka 1998.
- Antologija ruske disidentske drame; Hrvatski centar ITI, Zagreb 1998.
- Ruska emigrantska književna kritika; zbornik, Hrvatsko filološko društvo, Zagreb 1999.
- Hrvatska/Rusija; zbornik o rusko-hrvatskim kulturnim vezama, dvojezično, Društvo hrvatskih književnika, Zagreb 1999.
- Povratak slomljene strijele, roman, Književni krug Karlovac, Karlovac 2000.
- Sjajna zvijezda Rovinja, pripovijetke, Mozaik knjiga, Zagreb 2001.
- Hrvatska i svijet; zbornik, Hrvatsko filološko društvo, Zagreb 2002.
- Krvavi mjesec nad Pompejima, pripovijetke, Ceres, Zagreb 2002.
- Ruska književnost u Svemiru; studije, Disput, Zagreb 2003.
- Treći val; antologija ruske emigrantske književnosti potkraj 20. stoljeća, Disput i Hrvatsko filološko društvo, Zagreb 2004.
- Tajni život laponske princeze, pripovijetke, Disput, Zagreb 2004.
- Katalog važnih stvari, kolumne o svakodnevnom životu, Meandar, Zagreb 2005.
- Pismo iz Sankt Peterburga, roman, Biblioteka I.G.Kovačić, Karlovac 2006.
- Ruski emigranti u Hrvatskoj između dva rata; zbornik, Hrvatsko filološko društvo, Zagreb 2006.
- Ogledi o ruskoj književnosti; Hrvatsko filološko društvo, Zagreb 2006.
- Šezdesete – The Sixties; zbornik, Hrvatsko filološko društvo, Zagreb 2007.
- Brodski! Život, djelo; zbornik, Disput, Hrvatsko filološko društvo, Zagreb 2007.
- elektroničko izdanje: Krvavi mjesec nad Pompejima, pripovijetke, 2007. www.elektronickeknjige.com
- elektroničko izdanje: Pismo iz Sankt Peterburga, roman, 2008.
- Nebeski biciklisti, roman, Disput, Zagreb 2008. www.elektronickeknjige.com
- Duga Resa – Ixtlan, pripovijetke, Disput, Zagreb 2008.
- Dnevnici, snevnici, rječnici, dnevnička i esejistička proza, Meandar, Zagreb 2009.
- Sedamdesete, zbornik. Hrvatsko filološko društvo, Zagreb 2010.
- Vjesnici nove književnosti. Prikazi, recenzije, nacrti. Hrvatsko filološko društvo, Zagreb 2010.
- Blagovati na tragu klasika, književna “kuharica”. Hrvatsko filološko društvo i Disput, Zagreb 2011.
- Gradovi, sela, dvorci. Vodič za literarne putnike. Hrvatsko filološko društvo i Disput, Zagreb 2012.
- Očajnički sluteći Cohena, roman. Disput, Zagreb 2013.
- Idoli i barabe. Slavne osobe u književnim djelima: ogled. Hrvatsko filološko društvo i Disput, Zagreb 2014.
- Klasici ostavljeni mačkama: Pokušaj drukčijega čitanja književnih tekstova. Hrvatsko filološko društvo i Disput, Zagreb 2015.
- Berlin-Pariz, roman. Disput, Zagreb 2016.
- Sve o sestri Robina Hooda. Roman. Meandar Media, Zagreb 2018.
