= The Black Pearl (comics) =

1996 series published by Dark Horse Comics

- 1997 omnibus edition

Publication information
- Publisher: Dark Horse Comics
- Schedule: Monthly
- Format: Limited series
- Genre: Crime-thriller, superhero
- Publication date: September 1996 – January 1997
- No. of issues: 5
- Main character: Luther Drake

Creative team
- Created by: Mark Hamill; Eric Johnson
- Written by: Mark Hamill; Eric Johnson
- Penciller: H. M. Baker
- Inker(s): Bruce Patterson; Dan Schaeffer
- Letterer: Sean Konot
- Colorist: Bernie Mireault
- Editor: Bob Schreck

Collected editions
- The Black Pearl: ISBN 978-1-56971-274-0

The Black Pearl is a five-issue comic book limited series published by Dark Horse Comics in 1996, written by Mark Hamill, Co-written by Eric Johnson and illustrated by H. M. Baker, and inked by Bruce Patterson and Dan Schaeffer. The story focuses on Luther Drake, a troubled man who becomes a costumed vigilante "hero" by accident and media pressure.

Hamill described the "crime thriller" series as a "five-part graphic novel", less about superheroes and more about sensationalism, tabloid journalism, and "all the things that thrillers come from." Hamill has been promoting the idea, originally written as a screenplay, of a film adaptation of The Black Pearl, with himself as the director, since before the first issue of the comic was published in September 1996.

== Publication history ==
The series' production staff included letterer Sean Konot, colorist Bernie Mireault, editor Bob Schreck, and designer Scott Tice. The original covers for all five issues were created by series artist H. M. Baker.

== Plot synopsis ==
Issue #1 of 5, published September 1996, introduces Luther Drake as an average man who follows a woman named Tina home but becomes a media sensation when he prevents her abduction. This issue was pencilled by H. M. Baker and inked by Bruce Patterson.

Issue #2 of 5, published October 1996, sees Luther continue his vigilante activities while spurred on by personal demons and ever-increasing media attention. This issue was pencilled by H. M. Baker and inked by Bruce Patterson.

Issue #3 of 5, published November 1996, ramps up the media "frenzy" with unauthorized Black Pearl merchandise on the market and more people trying to make money off of Luther's growing fame, including "shock jock" Jerry Delman. This issue was pencilled by H. M. Baker and inked by Bruce Patterson.

Issue #4 of 5, published December 1996, puts Tina on the run after her best friend is murdered and tabloid reporter Frank Moran intensifies his search for the Black Pearl. This issue was pencilled by H. M. Baker and inked by both Bruce Patterson and Dan Schaeffer.

Issue #5 of 5, published January 1997, wraps up the series with heightened danger for the Black Pearl as Frank Moran goes missing, Tina is placed in harm's way, and Jerry Delman plots his comeback. This issue was pencilled by H. M. Baker and inked by Dan Schaeffer.

== Collected editions ==
The complete run of the comic was collected by Dark Horse Comics in a 1997 trade paperback (ISBN 978-1569712740), albeit in a "remastered" form. The publisher removed the nudity and toned down the language to "make the book suitable for all ages". The 120-page trade paperback included introductions by Bill Mumy and Peter David plus a cover gallery.

== Other media ==
=== Computer version ===
In November 1998, the Orlando Sentinel reported that Hamill was at work on a "computer version" of The Black Pearl for Access Software with a scheduled release date of October 1999. The company was acquired by Microsoft in April 1999 and this project was never released.

=== Film adaptation ===
Although The Black Pearl was originally co-written with his cousin, Eric Johnson, as a screenplay, Hamill has reported difficulties getting Hollywood to make a film adaptation that matches his vision for the project. He first expressed a strong desire to direct a film version of the story in January 1996, months before the first issue hit newsstands. Hamill has allowed multiple production deals to elapse and announced several projected dates for the start of filming. At the L.A. Comedy Shorts Film Festival on April 17, 2010, Hamill announced he secured backing from British investors for a $7-million budget, and that he will direct the film. He made a formal announcement at the Cannes Film Festival in May 2010. Hamill described his vision for the project as a "dark, edgy thriller" and that he would be seeking an "R" rating for the completed film.
