= Mitar Milošević =

Serbian writer

- Occupations: writer, editor, publisher
- Writing career
- Pen name: Frederik Ešton, Frederick Ashton, Novak Tatar, Miloš Nenadić, Moris Baskil, Rodžer Dunkan, Džordž Braun
- Notable works: Lun, kralj ponoći

Mitar Milošević (1924–1995), also known by his pseudonym Frederik Ešton (Frederick Ashton), was a Serbian and Yugoslav writer from Montenegro.

== Professional career ==
Milošević wrote a dozen historical novels, but is best known for his work on Lun, kralj ponoći (Lun, the King of Midnight), a series of pulp novels featuring Donald Sikert, a character inspired by James Bond. Pulps and comic books were very popular in former Yugoslavia; from 1971 to 1981, 11,611 issues were printed, a total of 717 million copies in the country of 22 million people. Lun, kralj ponoći reached the circulation of 100,000 copies and sold a total of 10 million copies, including numerous reprints. From 1959 to the mid-1990s, Milošević wrote more than 70 novels featuring Lun.

== Influence ==
The character became a popular icon in Yugoslavia, but it was not until a 1970s interview that his audience learned Milošević was a domestic author.

From 1984 to 1987, a team of Serbian writers and artists produced 30 issues of Lun comics for Dnevnik. Only the first episode was based on the source material whereas the rest featured original stories.

An unrelated comic book series, Lunov magnus strip, was named after Milošević's character. The first issue did have a Lun story but the feature was dropped with #2 because it was decided Lun readers were older, whereas the young preferred comics to novels.

== Personal life ==
Milošević was born in Uvač, Kingdom of Yugoslavia (presently in Montenegro). As a high schooler he joined the Yugoslav Partisans in 1941 and fought in WW2. Milošević was a decorated officer who rose to the rank of a captain when he left the Yugoslav Army in 1953, due to a fight with a superior officer. Milošević lived in Novi Sad (presently Serbia), where he worked as a reporter, editor and writer.

== See also ==
- Ninja (comic book)
