= Predrag Bambić =

Serbian actor and film director

Predrag Bambić is a Serbian film and television cinematographer and producer born August 7, 1958, in Belgrade, Yugoslavia.

== Education ==
From 1977 through 1981, Bambić studied at the University of Arts in Belgrade in the Film and TV Camera department of the Faculty of Drama Arts, earning his Master of Arts degree.

== Career ==
From 1981 through 1988, Bambić worked at TV Belgrade filming the pop-culture related serials Pop Express and Rock’n’Rolller, and also filming over 2,000 information, documentary, and music programs.

In 1986, he joined the Yugoslav Army Marines, and from 1989 through 1993 worked for the Yugoslav Army's film production company Zastava film where he specialized in filming training films for the Yugoslav Air Force. He also documented the genesis of the violent disintegration of Yugoslavia, covering all the major events related to the development of the wars in Slovenia, Croatia and Bosnia-Herzegovina, much of which was seen on the BBC documentary serial The Death of Yugoslavia.

From 1992 through 1994, Bambić filmed many news stories and documentaries on the war in Bosnia and Croatia for: BBC, CNN, CBS, Sky News, and ABC, among others. From 1995 through 1996, he worked for Reuters TV agency, covering all the major news stories and events in southeast Europe, including the wars in Croatia and Bosnia. From 1996 through 2002, he worked for CNN International on many assignments, reports, and documentaries about all the (then) tumultuous events in the Balkans.

In both 1999 and 2000, Bambić was nominated for the Rory Peck Trust "Hard News Award" for his work with CNN.

In 2002, he became the co-founder and manager of the Montage film and TV production company, one of the first, truly independent, film production companies in Serbia.

He is the author of many well-known pictures of the wars in the Balkans.

== Filmography ==
As a director of photography

2007: "Vilenjakova prica" (a.k.a.:Willow's story), feature film
2007: Agi i Emma, feature film
2005: Jug jugoistok (a.k.a. South by Southeast), feature film
2004: Sokratova odbrana i smrt (a.k.a. Socrates' defence and death), TV documentary
2004: Japan danas, TV documentary serial
2001: Bez grada i bez zakona, feature film
2000: Zemlja istine, ljubavi i slobode (a.k.a. Land of Truth, Love and Freedom), feature film
1999: Yugoslavia, avoidable war, TV documentary film
1996: Het Misferstand (a.k.a. Misunderstanding), TV documentary
1994: Japan, road to Future, TV documentary serial
1992: Velika frka (a.k.a. Big Mess)(a.k.a. Велика фрка (Yugoslavia: Serbian title)), feature film
1990: Cudna noc (a.k.a. Odd Night), feature film
1989: Fear, short feature film
1988: Happy New 1989., short feature film
1988: Dome, slatki dome (a.k.a. Home, Sweet Home), TV series
1987: Special Education, short documentary film
1985: Leibach, Victory Under the Sun, short documentary film
1985: Springtime has begun, feature TV film
1983: Titan, short documentary film
1981: Lagani povratak (a.k.a. Slow Return), feature film

... and about thirty other documentaries.

As a producer:

2007: Agi i Emma, feature film
2005: Jug jugoistok (a.k.a. South by Southeast), feature film
2004: Poljupci (a.k.a. Kisses), feature film
2000: Zemlja istine, ljubavi i slobode (a.k.a. Land of Truth, Love and Freedom), feature film

As an actor:

2000: Zemlja istine, ljubavi i slobode (a.k.a. Land of Truth, Love and Freedom), feature film
1981: Decko koji obecava (a.k.a. Promising Guy), feature film

As a director:

1980: Unsaddled, TV documentary
