= Ahmet Muminović =

Yugoslav comic book artist and journalist (1945–2019)

Ahmet Muminović (1945–2019), was a Yugoslav (Bosnia and Herzegovina) comic book artist and journalist, best known for his comic series Valter brani Sarajevo (Valter Defends Sarajevo) about a World War II Yugoslav partisan.

Ahmet Muminović was born in Gornji Vakuf and finished a gymnasium in Bugojno. Later he studied history at the Faculty of Philosophy, University of Sarajevo. He had his first two solo exhibitions while being a gymnasium and university student. He published his first comic strip in 1968, in a children's magazine, Male novine. It was a series Emir i Nikolino set in the times of the Ottoman rule. Ahmet says it was mostly a cowboy-style action, with horses and guns. During 1972-1992 he worked as an artistic and technical editor of the magazine. He is recognized as the most productive comic artist in Bosnia and Herzegovina. He also published in Sweden, Finland, France, Spain, Turkey, and China. During the Bosnian War he was a war journalist for the newspaper Ratni glas, Bosnia and Herzegovina. After the war he continued working in children's and youth press. For many years he had a column in the newspaper Dnevni avaz.

Belgrade's newspaper Politika officially declared him the best-selling author in the former Yugoslavia, when 8 million copies of his comic series about Valter were printed in China. It was reprinted by Agarthi Comics in 2016 (reprinted in 2024, French translation in 2023), with added photographs of the real war hero, Vladimir Perić, nom de guerre "Valter". The same title has a 1972 Yugoslav film, Walter Defends Sarajevo. The film and comic strip are loosely based on the real Valter, and a number of scenes from the film were transferred to the comic.

Ahmed's wife, Zekira, helped him with creating comics since his youth times: he would draw the comics, and she would color them. The couple could produce up to 500 pages a year. The couple married when he was the second-year student.

Ahmet Muminović died at the age of 74 in Sarajevo

== Selected works ==
- 1968: Emir and Nikolino

The action is set in the times of the Ottoman rule. Emir was a Turk from Bosnia, and Nikolino was from Dubrovnik. They were supposed to take three hundred ducats from Dubrovnik to Turkey.

- 1970s:Otpisani

It was released together with the TV series with same name, Otpisani, about Yugoslav anti-Nazi resistance fighters. It was reprinted in 2025 by Agarthi Comics.

- Valter brani Sarajevo (Valter Defends Sarajevo)
- Some episodes of Veliki Blek (Yugoslav version of Il Grande Blek)
