= Zlatko Gall =

Croatian music journalist and critic

Zlatko Gall (born December 1, 1954) is a Croatian journalist, commentator and rock critic.

Gall was born in Split, and he graduated in art history and archeology at the Faculty of Humanities and Social Sciences at the University of Zagreb. Gall worked as a journalist in Slobodna Dalmacija from 1979 to 1995. After working for Tjednik and Feral Tribune weeklies, he returned to Slobodna Dalmacija in 2001.

Gall is known as an advocate for rock music as an expression of urban culture and liberal values. He sees rock music as the antithesis of turbo folk which was associated with rural culture, conservative values, extreme nationalism and right-wing politics in former Yugoslavia. He criticises musicians who add those elements to make their music more publicly accessible. In Slobodna Dalmacija he wrote an article lambasting the Ivan Zajc theatre in Rijeka for hiring the turbo folk musician Severina Vučković for a production of the popular musical Karolina Riječka in 2003. Gall was quoted numerous times in a 2006 Ethnopolitics journal article about music in the former Yugoslavia.
