= Vladimir Krstić (comics) =

Serbian comic-book and graphic novel creator, painter and illustrator

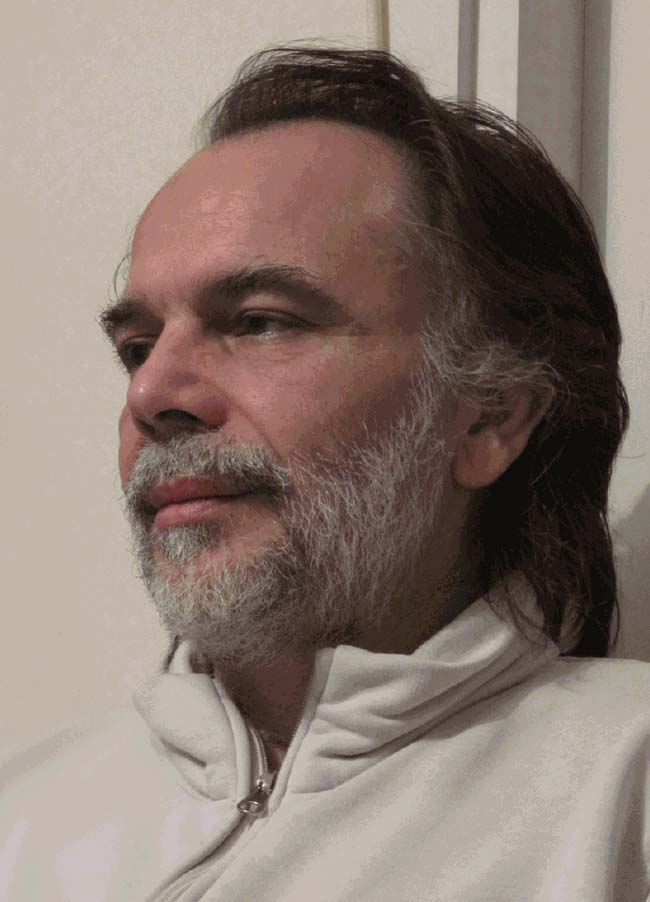
- Born: Vladimir Krstić; February 21, 1959 (age 67) Niš, Yugoslavia
- Areas: Artist; Painter; Comics creator
- Notable works: Billy Wanderer; Sherlock Holmes; Adam Wild; Ghosted

Vladimir Krstić (Serbian Cyrillic: Владимир Крстић - Лаци, born February 21, 1959 Niš), known by the pseudonym Laci, is an internationally published Serbian comic-book and graphic novel creator, painter, and illustrator.

He is known best for his comics series "Billy Wanderer" (1984–1985, written by Miodrag Krstić), "Veliki Blek / Blek le Rok" (1986, written by Petar Aladžić), "Ninja" (1988, written by M. Krstić), "Sherlock Holmes" (2010-, written by Sylvain Cordurié), "Adam Wild" (2014–2016, written by Gianfranco Manfredi) and Ghosted (2015, written by Joshua Williamson).

He was one of the founders of Association of Comics' Artists of Serbia (Udruženje stripskih umetnika Srbije, USUS) 2010.
