= Dečje novine =

Mass media companies of Serbia

- Native name: Дечје новине
- Industry: Publishing
- Founded: Gornji Milanovac, Serbia (December 11, 1956)
- Defunct: 2001
- Headquarters: Gornji Milanovac, Serbia
- Area served: SFR Yugoslavia
- Key people: Srećko Jovanović (founder and longtime editor)
- Products: Comics, magazines, books, sticker albums

Dečje novine (Serbian Cyrillic: Дечје новине; Children's newspaper) was a publishing house based in Gornji Milanovac. It was known as the largest comics publisher of the former Yugoslavia. It also published books, magazines and sticker albums. They had almost exclusive right to publish comics of The Walt Disney Company in Yugoslavia, and excelled as publishers of DC Comics and Marvel Comics comic books.

Dečje novine were founded in 1956 by Srećko Jovanović. With the outbreak of war in Yugoslavia and the collapse of the state they collapsed in the early 1990s. Bankruptcy lasted until 2001, when it sold the remaining assets to settle the numerous creditors.

== Main publications ==
- Dečje novine (magazine for school children, mainly with content meant for the higher grades)
- Tik-Tak (magazine for school children, for younger children)
- Zeka (magazine for school children, for younger children)
- Eks almanah (comic magazine, included a wide variety of comics in every issue)
- Yu strip, later Yu strip magazin (published exclusively comics of domestic authors)
- Gigant (comic magazine)
- Nikad robom (comic magazine)
- Džuboks (music magazine)
- Moment (visual media magazine)
- Venac (literature and culture magazine)
