= Dnevnik (Novi Sad) =

Serbian newspaper

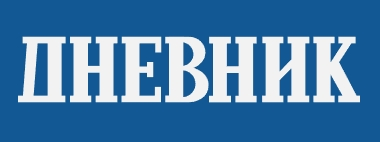

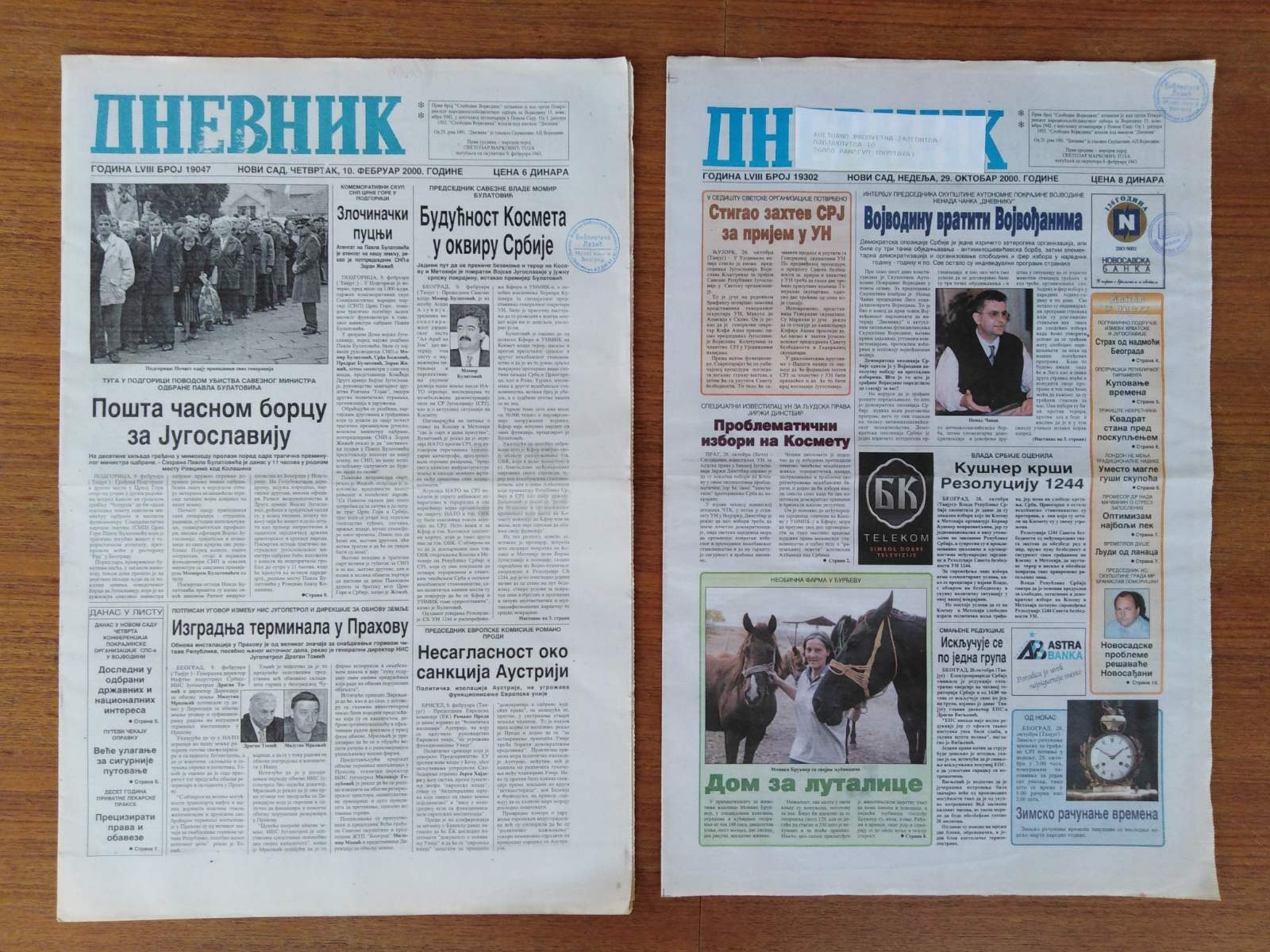
- Type: Daily newspaper
- Format: Berliner
- Owner: Dnevnik Vojvodina Press
- Editor: Nada Vujovic
- Manager: Dusan Vlaovic
- Founded: 15 November 1942; 83 years ago
- Political alignment: Populism; Sensationalism; Pro-SNS
- Language: Serbian
- Headquarters: Bulevar Mihajla Pupina 6, Novi Sad, Serbia
- Circulation: ~8,000 copies sold (2016)
- Website: www.dnevnik.rs

Dnevnik (Serbian Cyrillic: Дневник, lit. 'Daily news') is a regional daily newspaper, published in Novi Sad, Serbia.

== History ==
The newspaper was founded during Axis occupation in 1942, and its original name was Slobodna Vojvodina (Serbian Cyrillic: Слободна Војводина, lit. 'Free Vojvodina'). The first issue was published on November 15, 1942, as an organ of the provincial people's liberation board for Vojvodina in an underground printing house in Novi Sad. Its first editor was Svetozar Marković Toza who was later executed by the Axis occupation authorities on February 9, 1943, and subsequently proclaimed a people's hero by the Yugoslav post-World War II communist authorities.

On January 1, 1953, the newspaper's name was officially changed to Dnevnik.

== See also ==
- List of newspapers in Serbia
