= List of magazines in Italy =

In Italy there are many magazines. In the late 1920s there were nearly one hundred literary magazines. Following the end of World War II the number of weekly magazines significantly expanded. From 1970 feminist magazines began to increase in number in the country. The number of consumer magazines was 975 in 1995 and 782 in 2004. There are also Catholic magazines and newspapers in the country. A total of fifty-eight Catholic magazines was launched between 1867 and 1922. From 1923 to 1943, the period of the Fascist Regime, only ten new Catholic magazines was started. In the period from 1943 to the end of the Second Vatican Council thirty-three new magazines were established. Until 2010 an additional eighty-six Catholic magazines were founded.

The magazines had 3,400 million euros revenues in 2009, and 21.5% of these revenues were from advertising.

The following is an incomplete list of current and defunct magazines published in Italy. They are published in Italian or other languages.

== 0-9 ==
- 1928
- 30 Days
- 900, Cahiers d'Italie et d'Europe

== A ==
- ABC
- Abitare
- Affari Esteri
- Agora
- AIPC Magazine
- Airone
- L'ala d'Italia
- alfabeta
- Alter
- Altreragioni
- Amica
- Anna
- Annabella
- L'Approdo
- L'Approdo letterario
- Archeo
- Archeologia Viva
- ARCHI magazine
- L'Architettura
- Arena
- Armi e Tiro
- Arte
- Artribune
- L'Asino
- Asso di bastoni
- L'Audace
- Aut Aut
- Auto
- Autosprint
- L'Avventuroso
- L'Azione Coloniale

== B ==
- Il Balilla
- Il Baretti
- Barche
- Il Bargello
- Il Becco Giallo
- Belfagor
- Bell'Italia
- Bellezza
- Bertoldo
- Bianco e Nero
- Biciclette d'Epoca
- Bicisport
- Byoblu Informazioni Classificate
- Blow Up
- Blue
- Bolero Film
- Bomber
- Il Borghese
- Botteghe Oscure
- Brera
- Broom: An International Magazine of the Arts
- Buscadero
- Butchered from Inside

== C ==
- Il Caffè
- Il Caffè
- Calcio 2000
- Il Calcio Illustrato
- Il calendario del popolo
- Campo di Marte
- Candido
- Cannibale
- Cantachiaro
- Casa & Giardino
- Casa Chic
- Casa da Sogno
- Casa Naturale
- Casabella
- CasaFacile
- Casantica
- Chi
- Ciao 2001
- Ciak
- Cinema Nuovo
- Cipria
- Circoli
- Class
- Classe Operaia
- Collezioni
- Colors
- Comunità
- Il Conciliatore
- Confidentiel
- Il Convegno
- Cordelia
- Corrente di Vita
- Corriere dei Piccoli
- Corriere delle dame
- Corriere Emiliano
- Cose di Casa
- Il Costruttore
- Il Covile
- La Critica
- Critica fascista
- Critica marxista
- Cronache Sociali
- La Cucina Italiana
- Cucinare Bene
- Cuore

== D ==
- Diario
- La Difesa della Razza
- Diva e Donna
- Divisare
- Dlui
- Domus
- Don Basilio
- La Donna
- Donna Moderna
- Dottrina fascista

== E ==
- Easy Milano
- Edizioni Oriente
- Effe
- Emporium
- Epoca
- Espansione
- Espero
- L'espresso
- Eurasia, Rivista di Studi Geopolitici
- Eureka
- L'Europeo
- Eva

== F ==
- Famiglia Cristiana
- Fenomeno Inter
- La Fiera Letteraria
- Figli d'Italia
- Il Fischietto
- Flash Art
- Focus
- For Men
- Forza Milan
- Frigidaire
- Il Frontespizio
- Frusta letteraria

== G ==
- Gambero Rosso
- Game Pro
- The Games Machine
- Gente
- Gerarchia
- Il Mio Giardino
- Giardino Antico
- Giochi per il mio computer
- Gioia
- Giornale per i bambini
- Giornale dei Ragazzi
- Il Giornalino
- Il giornalino della Domenica
- Il Giorno dei Ragazzi
- Gioventù Fascista
- Il Gommone
- Grand Hotel
- Grazia
- Guerin Meschino
- Guerin Sportivo

== H ==
- Hebdomada Aenigmatum
- Hurrà Juventus

== I ==
- Il Nuovo Calcio
- L'Illustrazione Italiana
- L'Illustrazione Vaticana
- Industrial Engineering News Italia
- InMoto
- Internazionale
- Interni
- Intrepido
- IO Donna

== J ==
- Jack
- Journal de Bordighera
- Jumbo

== K ==
- Klat

== L ==
- L Football
- L'Italia settimanale
- L'Italiano
- L'Italia futurista
- Lanciostory
- Lapis
- Lavoro Politico
- Lazio Style 1900
- Le Arti
- Leggere Donna
- Lei
- Leonardo
- Lettres de Rome
- Letteratura
- Liberal
- Lidel
- Limes
- Linus
- Lo Sport Fascista
- Lombard
- La Lupa

== M ==
- Madrigale
- Il Mago
- Malafemmina
- Marc'Aurelio
- Margherita
- Il Male
- Il Marzocco
- Max
- Memoria
- Il Menabò di letteratura
- Mente
- Meridiani
- Meridiano di Roma
- Messenger of Saint Anthony
- Micron
- MicroMega
- I Miei Dolci
- Millionaire
- Il Mio Cane
- Il Mio Papa
- Il Mondo
- Mondoperaio
- Il Monello
- Motosprint
- Il Mucchio Selvaggio
- Il Mulino
- Musica Jazz

== N ==
- Nautica
- Neural magazine
- Nintendo La Rivista Ufficiale
- Noi: Rivista d’arte futurista
- Noi donne
- Noi Ragazzi
- Noi Testarde
- Novella 2000
- Nuovi Argomenti
- Nuovo Canzoniere Italiano
- La Nuova Italia

== O ==
- Occidente
- Officina
- Oggi
- Omnibus
- Onomata Kechiasmena
- Le Ore
- Orient Express
- Orpheus
- L’Orsaminore

== P ==
- Paesaggio Urbano
- Pallavolo Supervolley
- Panorama
- Paperino e altre avventure
- Pattuglia
- Pègaso
- Perini Journal
- Piemonte Parchi
- Il Pioniere
- Platform Architecture and Design
- Playmen
- PlayStation
- La Plebe
- Poesia
- Il Politecnico
- Politica
- Il Ponte
- Popoli
- Presenza
- Progetto Babele
- Protecta

== P ==
- Passione Giardino & Orto

== Q ==
- Quaderni piacentini
- Quaderni Rossi
- Quadrante
- Quarto Stato
- Quattroruote
- Qui Touring

== R ==
- La Raccolta
- Radiocorriere
- Il Regno
- Ricette per Friggitrice ad aria
- Rinascita
- Il Rinnovamento
- Rivista Italiana Difesa
- La Rivoluzione Liberale
- Rockerilla
- La Roma
- La Ronda
- Rosso e Nero
- Rumore

== S ==
- Il Saggiatore
- Sale & Pepe
- Sapere
- Sardegna Immaginare
- Der Schlern
- Le Scienze
- Lo Scolaro
- Il Selvaggio
- Sette
- Settimana Incom
- La Settimana Enigmistica
- La Sibilla
- Sigma
- Silhouette Donna
- Al Siyassa Al Musawwara
- Skorpio
- Società
- Soft Revolution
- Sogno
- Solaria
- Sottosopra
- Starbene
- Lo Stato
- Strapaese
- Sud
- Sukia
- Superbasket Magazine

== T ==
- Tango
- La Tavola Rotonda
- Tempo
- Tempo Presente
- This is a magazine
- Topolino
- Il Travaso delle idee
- I Treni
- La Tribuna Illustrata
- Tu Style
- Tuttestorie
- TV Sorrisi e Canzoni

== U ==
- Unitalia Film
- L'Universale
- Urania
- Urbanistica

== V ==
- Valori plastici
- Vegetariani in Cucina
- Velvet
- Il Venerdì
- La Verità
- Il Vernacoliere
- Il Verri
- Vie Nuove
- Ville & Casali
- Vita e pensiero
- Il Vittorioso
- Vivere Country
- La Voce
- Vogue Italia
- Al Volante
- Volare
- Volo a Vela

== W ==
- We Veg

== X ==
- Xbox Magazine Ufficiale

== Y ==
- Yamato

== See also ==
- List of newspapers in Italy
- Media of Italy
