= Corriere dei Piccoli =

Italian children's magazine

- Categories: Children's magazine
- Frequency: Weekly
- First issue: 27 December 1908; 117 years ago
- Final issue: 15 August 1995; 30 years ago
- Country: Italy
- Based in: Milan
- Language: Italian

The Corriere dei Piccoli (Italian for "Courier of the Little Ones"), later nicknamed Corrierino ("Little Courier"), was a weekly magazine for children published in Italy from 1908 to 1995. It was the first Italian periodical to make a regular feature of publishing comic strips.

== Publication history ==
Corriere dei Piccoli was established in 1908. The first issue (24 pages, 80,000 copies) was published on 27 December 1908, with Silvio Spaventa Filippi as editor-in-chief. It was founded by Luigi Albertini. The magazine was formally a supplement for children of Corriere della Sera, but it was also sold separately for 0.10 lira At its acme, the magazine sold 700,000 copies.

By 1970 the magazine started having financial difficulties due to rising costs and competition by other magazines and comics books. Feeling that the quaint name was partly to blame, on 1 January 1972 the publisher renamed the bulk of the magazine Corriere dei Ragazzi, which hopefully would be more appealing to teenagers. The name Corriere dei Piccoli survived as the title of a thin supplement of the publication, aimed at the younger readers, but after a few months it became an autonomous magazine again. Corriere dei Ragazzi, later renamed Corrier Boy, ceased publications in 1984.

The last issue of Corriere dei Piccoli was dated 15 August 1995.

== Contents ==
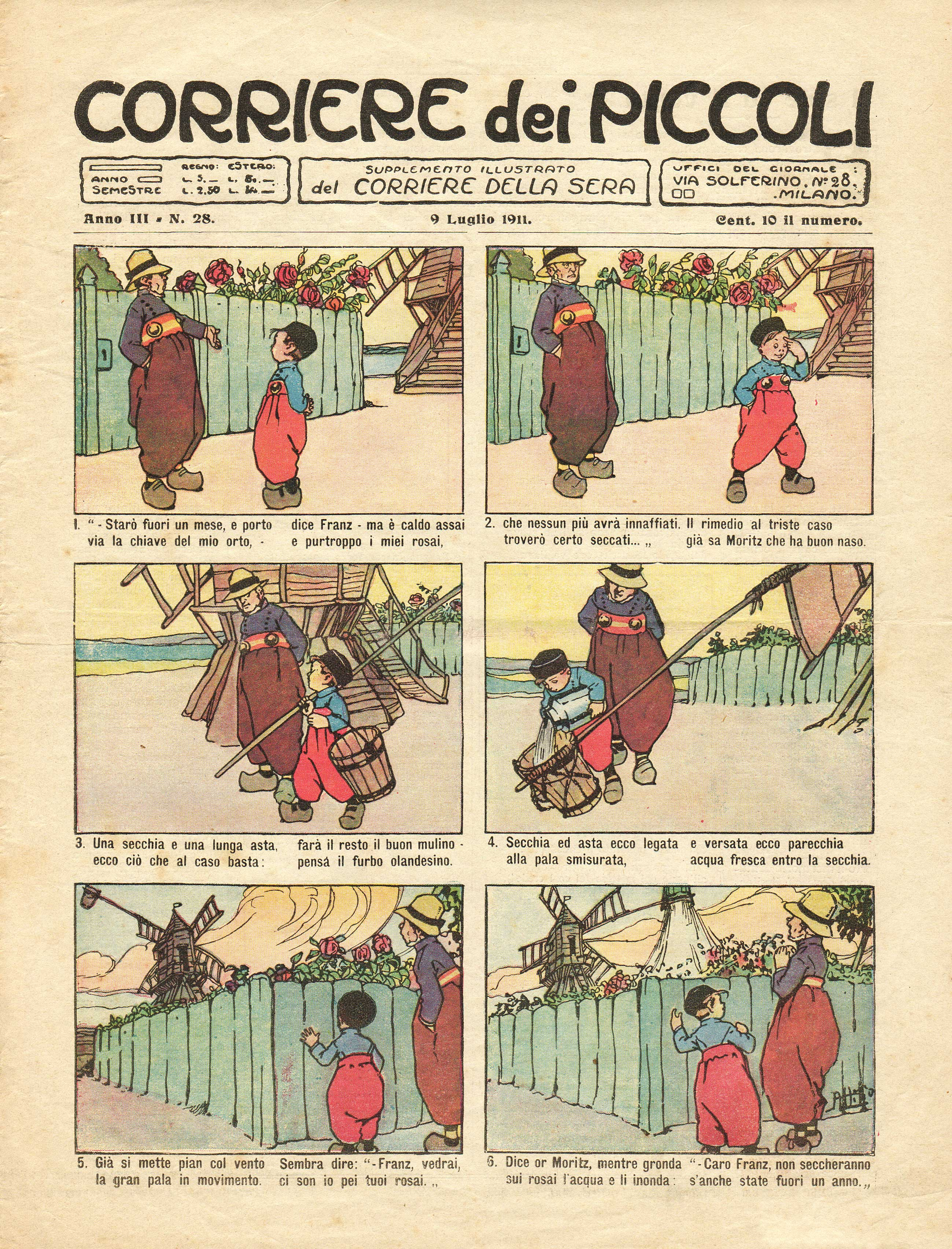
The cover of the 11 July 1911 edition carries a cartoon strip in the Italian style without speech bubbles.

Throughout its history, the Corrierino published material in many genres: stories in comic strip format, illustrated tales and novels (usually in half-page to two-page weekly installments), educational material, feature columns, humor, news, reviews, readers' letters, puzzles, board games, and more.

Although comic strips had been published before in Italian children's magazines—Il novellino had published American examples including, in 1904, a Yellow Kid cartoon—the Corriere was the first to make them a regular feature and the first to commission original Italian artwork as well as using American strips. A typically Italian comic strip format was introduced by the Corrierino from its first issue. The full page was divided into six equal panels, in three rows. Instead of text balloons (which were already used in the US, but were considered educationally regressive by the Italian editors), the narrative and dialogue were provided by octosyllabic rhymed couplets underneath each panel, e.g.:

Qui comincia l'avventura	"Here begins the adventure
Del Signor Bonaventura ...	of Mr. Bonaventura ... "

In time this format gave way to balloon-captioned comics, which, besides being the universal norm outside Italy, made for more lively action and dialogue, and gave more freedom to the artists in the choice of panel size and layout. Nevertheless, strips in this "Italian format" continued to make sporadic appearances throughout the life of the magazine, generally aimed at younger readers.

== Influence ==
Besides introducing comics to Italian public, the Corrierino greatly influenced four generations of Italians, and played a significant role in the career of many Italian artists and writers, such as Giana Anguissola, Mino Milani, Hugo Pratt, Lino Penati, Dino Battaglia, Aldo Di Gennaro, Sergio Toppi, Mario Uggeri, Benito Jacovitti, Guido Buzzelli, Anna Franchi and many more.

== Comics series ==
Comics which appeared in the magazine include:

- Gli Aristocratici
- Bilbolbul
- Gianconiglio
- Italino
- Lady Love
- Lupo Alberto
- Marmittone
- Marzolino Tarantola
- Nick Carter
- L'Omino Bufo
- Pier Cloruro de' Lambicchi
- Pimpa
- Quadratino
- Re di Picche
- Signor Bonaventura
- Sor Pampurio
- Tarzanetto
- Zorry Kid

== See also ==
- List of magazines published in Italy
- Other contemporaneous magazines for children published in Italy:
  - Il giornalino della Domenica (1906–1927), weekly.
  - Lo Scolaro (1912–1972), weekly; educational.
  - Il Giornalino (1924-), weekly; Catholic orientation.
  - Giornale dei Ragazzi (1926–1943), fortnightly; Fascist orientation.
  - Gioventù Fascista, (1931–1936), weekly; Fascist propaganda.
  - Jumbo (1932–1938), weekly.
  - Il Monello (1933–1990), weekly.
  - L'Audace (1934–1944), weekly.
  - L'Avventuroso (1934–1943), weekly, for young adults.
  - Topolino (1934-), weekly; Walt Disney characters.
  - Intrepido (1935–1998), weekly.
  - Il Vittorioso (1937–1966), weekly; Catholic orientation.
  - Il Giorno dei Ragazzi (1957–1968), weekly; supplement of daily Il Giorno.
  - Eureka (1967–1989), monthly.
  - linus (1965-), monthly; leftist orientation.
- List of magazines published in Italy
- Some contemporaneous European children's magazines:
  - Spirou (1938-), Belgian weekly.
  - Tintin (1946–1993), Belgian weekly.
