= Mario Uggeri =

Italian comic artist, painter and illustrator

- Born: 17 February 1924; Codogno, Italy
- Died: 8 March 2004 (aged 80); Milan, Italy
- Occupation: Comics artist

Mario Uggeri (17 February 1924 – 8 March 2004) was an Italian comics artist, illustrator and painter.

== Life and career ==
Born in Codogno, after getting a degree of technical engineer at young age Uggeri was an actor and a production designer in a stage company. During the World War II he became a partisan in the Italian resistance movement, and captured by Germans he was interned for two years in the Dachau concentration camp.

Freed in 1945, the same year he started his career a comics artist, realizing the series Revegant for Torelli Editore. In 1947 he created the comic strip Le avventure del partigiano Pesce for the newspaper Milano Sera, and in 1949 he started his most successful character, Rocky Rider, published in the magazines Intrepido and Il Monello until 1963. In 1959 he started a long collaboration with the children magazine Corriere dei Piccoli, for which he created a number of characters. He also collaborated with Sergio Bonelli Editore, illustrating the comic series Ipnos, Yuma Kid and several episodes of Tex.

Since 1967 Uggeri became the official cover-illustrator of La Domenica del Corriere, succeeding to Walter Molino. He was also illustrator for magazines, including Famiglia Cristiana, Gazzetta dello Sport and Amica, as well as for books, being the official illustrator of the series of western novels Tommy River by Mino Milani as well as a frequent cover-illustrator for the publisher Sperling & Kupfer.

In 1984 Uggeri decided to retire from comics as to focus on painting. He died of cardiac and pulmonary pathologies in 2004, aged 80 years old.
