= Grand Hotel (magazine) =

Italian weekly women's magazine

Grand Hotel is an Italian weekly women's magazine, published since 1946. The magazine is headquartered in Milan, Italy.

== History and profile ==
Initially consisting of only sixteen pages, Grand Hotel started its publications on 29 June 1946, and, in spite of being heavily attacked by the Catholic press, it got an immediate commercial success. It was characterized during the first decades of its history by "cineromanzi", i.e. comic stories, generally of romantic or melodramatic genre, which were released in sequential installments and whose comic characters resembled famous film actors.

The success of the magazine almost immediately generated a series of imitations, notably Sogno and Film Bolero, both published by Mondadori, and Letizia published by Lancio. From the 1960s the magazine gradually changed its formula, adding news articles and columns, and in 1970 it abandoned cineromanzi and replaced them with fotoromanzi. Grand Hotel is published on a weekly basis.

== See also ==
- List of magazines in Italy
- List of women's magazines
