= Gioia (magazine) =

Italian women's magazine (1937–2018)

- Editor in Chief: Maria Elena Viola
- Former editors: Marina Fausti
- Categories: Women's magazine; Fashion magazine
- Frequency: Weekly
- Publisher: Hearst Magazines Italia
- Founded: 1937
- First issue: 7 March 1937
- Final issue: 2018
- Company: Hearst Magazines
- Country: Italy
- Based in: Milan
- Language: Italian

Gioia (Italian: Joy) was a weekly fashion and women's magazine published in Milan, Italy, between 1937 and 2018.

== History and profile ==
Gioia was first published on 7 March 1937. Its owner and publisher was Rusconi Editore S.p.A. The owner of the company was Edilio Rusconi, an Italian journalist, writer, publisher and film producer. The company acquired the magazine in 1954 and first published it under the name Rusconi A Polazzi Editore in December 1956. The company was the founder and owner of news magazine Gente.

In February 1999 Hachette Filipacchi Médias, a subsidiary of Lagardère SCA, bought majority stake (90%) of Rusconi Group, the owner of Rusconi Editore S.p.A. Then Gioia began to be published by Hachette Rusconi. In 2011 Hearst Magazines acquired it from Hachette Rusconi. Following the acquisition Hachette Rusconi changed its name to Hearst Magazines Italia.

Gioia was published weekly by Hearst Magazines Italia. The headquarters of the weekly was in Milan. The magazine covered articles about beauty, fashion and health. Its target audience was middle-class women over 30.

From 2002 to 2006 Marina Fausti served as the co-editor-in-chief of Gioia. Maria Elena Viola also served in the post.

The weekly was redesigned in June 2013. The website was relaunched in July 2015. In 2018 Gioia ceased publication.

== Circulation ==
Gioia sold 403,246 copies in 1984. Its circulation was 197,000 copies in 2007.

== See also ==
- List of magazines in Italy
