= Sogno (disambiguation) =

Sogno is an album by Andrea Bocelli.

Sogno may also refer to:

- Sogno (magazine), an Italian women's magazine

== People ==
- Edgardo Sogno

== Music ==
- Sogno album by Andrea Mingardi 1993
- Il Sogno, album by Elvis Costello
- "Sogno", song by Don Backy, covered by Rudy Rickson, 1968
- "Io Sogno", song by Iva Zanicchi, 1969
- "Sogno" song by Mietta 1988
- "Sogno" song by Gianna Nannini 2009
