= Armando Gallo =

Italian journalist, photographer and book publisher

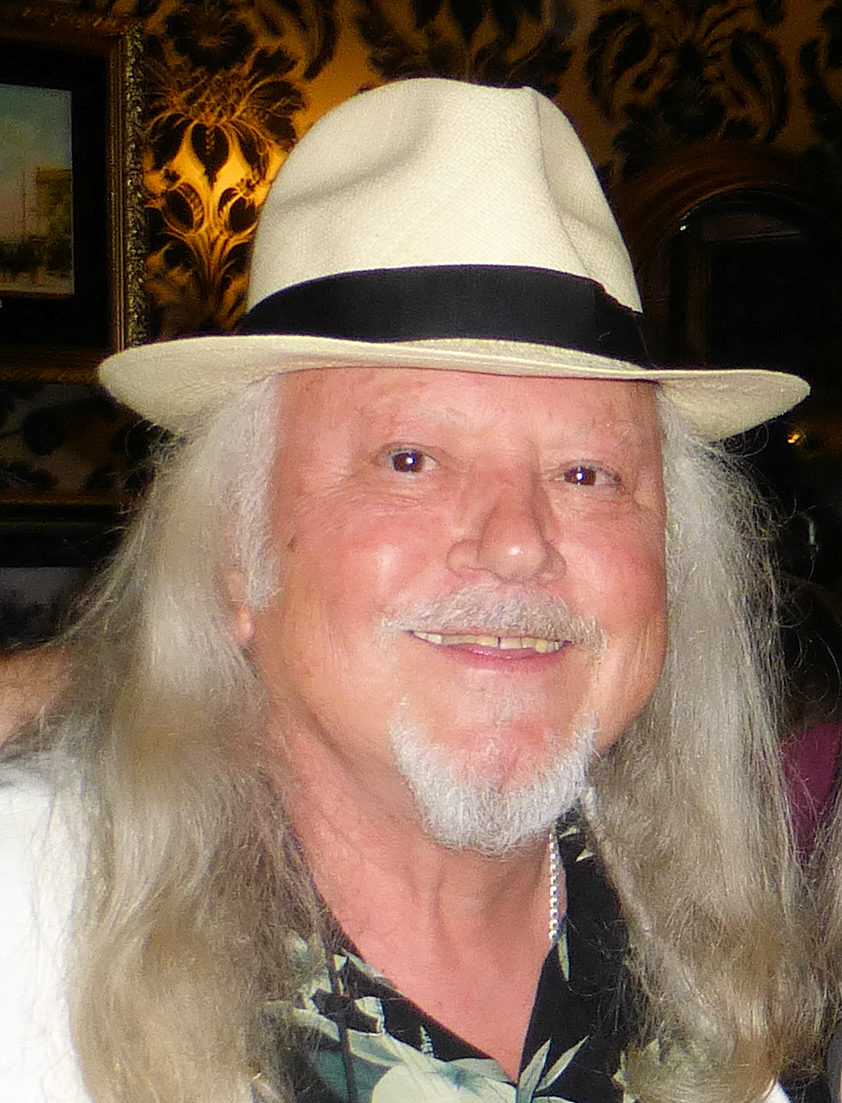
- Armando Gallo in 2014
- Born: Armando Gallo; 24 January 1944 (age 82); Mira, Veneto, Italy
- Occupation: Photographer
- Years active: 1967–current
- Website: http://www.armandogallo.com

Armando Gallo (born 24 January 1944) is an Italian journalist, photographer and book publisher.

Gallo has been a photojournalist since 1967, when he met the Beatles at the listening party of their Sgt. Pepper Lonely Heart Club Band. He wrote a cover story for the Italian magazine Ciao Big. Inspired by this experience, he left his career as an architecture designer to become the London correspondent for the Italian music magazine Ciao 2001, covering the events in the English pop and rock scene.

In the early 1970s, Gallo met Genesis before their first Italian tour and became a good friend of the band. His most high-profile work is a book about the band entitled Genesis: The Evolution of a Rock Band. Originally published in 1978, it chronicles the band's early days – a period of time never covered by any other biographical source up to that point, including the band members' full names. One notable fan of the book was Bob Marley, who was spotted reading it on the steps of his home in Kingston. The book was reprinted and expanded in 1980 with the new title I Know What I Like. By the early 1990s, after Genesis had reached their peak in popularity, the book was no longer available. As there was no sign it would ever be reprinted, zealous Genesis fans retyped out the text of the book as ASCII text in the early 1990s, but when plans for a reprint were announced, the files were taken down from the internet. In September 2014, the book was published on iTunes. Gallo also went on to put together several books on Genesis founding member Peter Gabriel.

In 1982, with his brother Claudio, he formed Fratelli Gallo Editori in Italy, editing and publishing over 40 music books as well as the monthly magazine PIX Photorock.

Gallo has worked as a photojournalist in Hollywood for the last 35 years as a correspondent of the Italian weekly magazine TV Sorrisi e Canzoni. He is a member of the Hollywood Foreign Press Association and as such is a voting member for the Golden Globes.

Gallo is currently collaborating with Italian magazines Grazia and Oggi.

== Bibliography ==
- Genesis: The Evolution of a Rock Band, Sidgwick and Jackson Limited, 1978. ISBN 0-283-98440-6 (paper) or 0 283 98439 2 (cloth). 145 pages.
- Genesis: I Know What I Like D.I.Y. Books, Los Angeles, 1980. ISBN 0-283-98703-0 Hardcover and leatherbound edition. (New softcover edition published in 1987, ISBN 978-0711911710).
- Genesis: From One Fan to Another, Omnibus Press, 1984. ISBN 0-7119-0515-0. Softcover, ISBN 0-7119-0514-2.
- Peter Gabriel, Omnibus Press, 1986. Softcover, ISBN 0-7119-0783-8.
