= Fabio Maniscalco =

Italian archaeologist

Fabio Maniscalco (Naples 1 August 1965 – 1 February 2008) was an Italian archaeologist, specialising in the protection of cultural property, and essayist.

== Biography ==
Fabio Maniscalco was born in Naples, Italy. He was an archaeologist who worked as a professor of "protection of cultural property" and of "underwater archaeology" at the University of Naples and at the "Istituto per lo Sviluppo, la Formazione e la Ricerca nel Mediterraneo". Moreover, he was selected Professor (of 'clear fame'), of "Safeguard of cultural heritage", at "Institute of Archaeology of Academy of Sciences of Albania".

Ex Officer of the Italian Army he has created and directed the Teams for the safeguard of cultural property in Bosnia and Herzegovina(1995–1996) and in Albania.

Fabio Maniscalco has been the first Officer in the world to have put into effect the rules of the 1954 Hague Convention for the Protection of Cultural Property in the Event of Armed Conflict.

Since 1998 Fabio Maniscalco is Director of the Observatory for Protection of Cultural Heritage in Areas of Crisis. He has directed projects and activities, about protection of cultural property, in Bosnia and Herzegovina, Kosovo, Albania, Middle East, Algeria, Nigeria, Afghanistan.

Professor Maniscalco was editor of the monographic collection Mediterraneum. Protection and Exploitation of Cultural and Environmental Heritage ; director of the scientific journal Web Journal on Cultural Patrimony and co-director of the monographic collection “Studi di Storia e topografia sulla Campania romana".

Fabio Maniscalco was member of the scientific committee and essayist of the periodical journal "Archeologia Viva". Moreover, he is member of the scientific committees of the academic journals “International Research Journal of Arts and Humanities” (University of Sindh, Pakistan) and of "Restauro Archeologico (University of Florence).

In the year 2007, because of the exposure to the depleded uranium Fabio Maniscalco fell ill with an anomalous and rare shape of adenocarcinoma of the pancreas.

=== Awards and memberships ===
Fabio Maniscalco has received many awards for his literary activity. In particular, he has received a Prize from the Italian "Presidenza del Consiglio dei Ministri" for the book Sarajevo. Itinerari artistici perduti and the ICCROM-UNESCO Prize "Media Save Art" for his articles about protection of Kosovo's cultural property. Moreover, he has received the prizes "Friend of Art 2007" from Legambiente and "Safeguard of Cultural Heritage" from the "Borsa Mediterranea del Turismo Archeologico". In 1997 Fabio Maniscalco was decorated by the President of Italy Oscar Luigi Scalfaro for his activity in the field of safeguard of cultural property. He was decorated, with NATO and Italian medals because he was officer during the peace-keeping missions IFOR and SFOR, in Bosnia and Herzegovina and Alba, in Albania.

Professor Maniscalco was Vice President of the Italian Committee of the Blue Shield, and member of the scientific committees of the Observatory Euro-Mediterranean and the Black Sea and of the "Museo della Nave Romana di Grado" (Italian Ministry for Cultural heritage". Moreover, he was member of the International Council on Monuments and Sites (ICOMOS) and honorary member of: Italian Union of the European Writers and Artists (UIL); Italian Association of Archaeologists and Forum per la Laguna di Venezia.

He died in Naples on 1 February 2008, for complications due to his rare shape of adenocarcinoma of the pancreas.

== Bibliography ==
=== Books on protection of cultural property ===
- Fabio Maniscalco, World Heritage and War, (2006) .
- Fabio Maniscalco, Protection of Nigerian Cultural Property (2006)
- Fabio Maniscalco (editor), Protection, Conservation and Exploitation of Palestinian Cultural Heritage, (2005).
- Fabio Maniscalco, Protection of Cultural property in Algeria, (2003).
- Fabio Maniscalco (editor), Protection of Cultural Heritage in War Areas, (2002).
- Fabio Maniscalco (editor), La tutela dei beni culturali in Italia,(2002).
- Fabio Maniscalco, Kosovo and Metohija 1998-2000, (2000).
- Fabio Maniscalco, Furti d'Autore. La tutela del patrimonio culturale mobile napoletano dal dopoguerra alla fine del XX secolo, (2000).
- Fabio Maniscalco, Jus Praedae, (1999).
- Fabio Maniscalco, Frammenti di storia venduta. I tesori di Albania, (1998).
- Fabio Maniscalco, Sarajevo: itinerari artistici perduti, (1997).

=== Books on underwater archaeology ===
- Fabio Maniscalco (editor),Protection, Conservation and Valorization of underwater cultural Property, 2004.
- Fabio Maniscalco, Piero Alfredo Gianfrotta (editors), Forma Maris. Forum internazionale di archeologia subacquea, (2001).
- Fabio Maniscalco, Fondamenti di archeologia subacquea, (1998).
- Fabio Maniscalco, Ninfei ed edifici marittimi severiani del Palatium imperiale di Baia, (1997).
- Fabio Maniscalco, Il nuoto nel mondo greco-romano, (1995).
- Fabio Maniscalco, Archeologia Subacquea, (1992).

=== Other ===
Fabio Maniscalco has published more than 200 papers, in international journals and books, and numerous Appeals for the safeguard of Cultural Property in areas of crisis.
