= Alex Troleis =

Faroese football referee

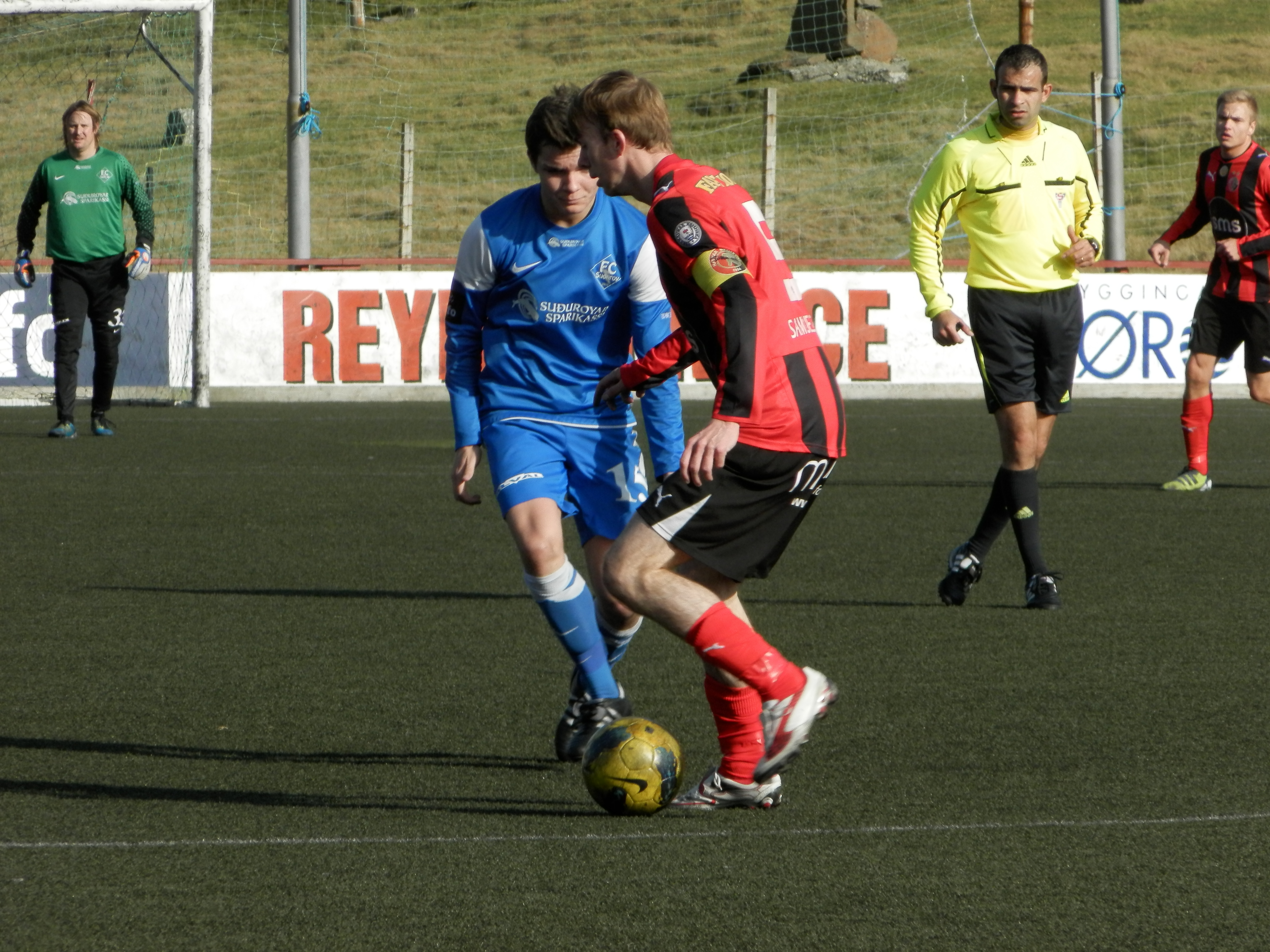
- Troleis (in yellow) refereeing a local match, 2012
- Full name: Alex de Albuquerque Troleis
- Born: 1979 or 1980 (age 45–46); Brazil

Domestic
Years	League	Role
2011–	Faroe Islands Premier League	Referee

International
Years	League	Role
2015–2022	FIFA listed	Referee

Alex de Albuquerque Troleis (born 1979 or 1980) is a Faroese former footballer and football referee who was a FIFA-listed international referee between 2015 and 2022.

== Career ==
Troleis was born in Brazil but moved to the Faroe Islands and became a naturalized Danish citizen, living in Toftir. A defender, he was a football player for B68 Toftir 2001 and 2007, and began his career as a referee shortly after retiring in 2007. Troleis oversaw games at the Faroese 1. deild kvinnur (women's top league), and refereed the next year's final of the Faroese Women's Cup between Klaksvíkar Ítróttarfelag and B36 Tórshavn. Also in 2008, Troleis was given official status at the Islands' 1. deild (men's second division) and, in 2009, refereed some matches in Danish football. He ascended to the Faroe Islands Premier League in 2011. In 2016, Troleis led the final game of the Faroe Islands Cup and the Faroe Islands Super Cup, which he refereed again in 2018. Troleis was also promoted by UEFA and FIFA to lead games at the 2018–19 UEFA Youth League, with his first match there being Tottenham Hotspur F.C. vs. Inter.

In November 2021, he oversaw the second-leg semifinal of the FI Cup between B36 Tórshavn and Víkingur Gøta.

At international level, Troleis has had roles in minor European leagues, like the UEFA Europa League in 2020, refereeing matches between less prominent teams, such as a game between SC Gjilani and SP Tre Penne, as well as qualification matches for the UEFA European Championship qualifying, including a victory of Kosovo U-21 against Norway U-21 in 2017, where he issued a red card to a Kosovar player in the 53rd minute. In the same year, Troleis also refereed another UEFA qualification match between the Czech Republic and San Marino (5–0).

Troleis' contract with FIFA ended in 2022, when his spot as a representative of the Faroe Islands was replaced by referee Jóhan Hendrik Ellefsen.

== Selected international record ==
UEFA European Championship qualifying
Date	Match	Result	Venue
12 June 2017	Norway – Kosovo	0–3	Marienlyst Stadion
8 October 2017	Czech Republic – San Marino	5–0	Doosan Arena
