= Espansione =

Italian monthly business magazine

- Categories: Business magazine
- Frequency: Monthly
- Founded: 1969; 57 years ago
- Country: Italy
- Based in: Milan
- Language: Italian
- Website: Espansione
- ISSN: 0014-0554
- OCLC: 25882630

Espansione is an Italian language monthly business magazine published in Milan, Italy, since 1969.

== History and profile ==
Espansione was established in 1969. The magazine is published by Newspaper Milano on a monthly basis. The magazine has its headquarters in Milan. The former owner and publisher was Mondadori, which sold it in 2002. In November 2004 the magazine was restarted by Newspaper Milano following the changes in format and content. In 2007 it became a supplement of the daily newspaper Il Giornale. The magazine is still published monthly on the first Friday of each month.

== Circulation ==
Espansione was the best-selling business magazine in Italy in 2009 with a circulation of 143,000 copies. In 2010 the magazine sold 143,919 copies.

== See also ==
- List of magazines in Italy
