= Affari Esteri =

Italian journal on foreign affairs

Affari Esteri is an Italian journal on foreign affairs. Published quarterly in Rome, it has the support of the Italian Ministry of Foreign Affairs.

The review was founded in 1969 by ASPE - Associazione Italiana per gli Studi di Politica Estera (Italian Association for Foreign Policy Studies).

== See also ==
- List of magazines in Italy
