= Donna Moderna =

Italian weekly women's magazine

- Categories: Women's magazine; Fashion magazine
- Frequency: Weekly
- Publisher: Arnoldo Mondadori Editore SPA
- Founded: 1988; 38 years ago
- First issue: 22 March 1988
- Company: Arnoldo Mondadori Editore
- Country: Italy
- Based in: Milan
- Language: Italian
- Website: Donna Moderna

Donna Moderna (Italian: Modern Woman) is an Italian language weekly women's and fashion magazine based in Milan, Italy. It has been in circulation since 1988.

== History and profile ==
Donna Moderna was established in 1988. The magazine is published on a weekly basis and is part of Arnoldo Mondadori Editore. The publisher is also Arnoldo Mondadori Editore SPA. The headquarters of the weekly is in Milan.

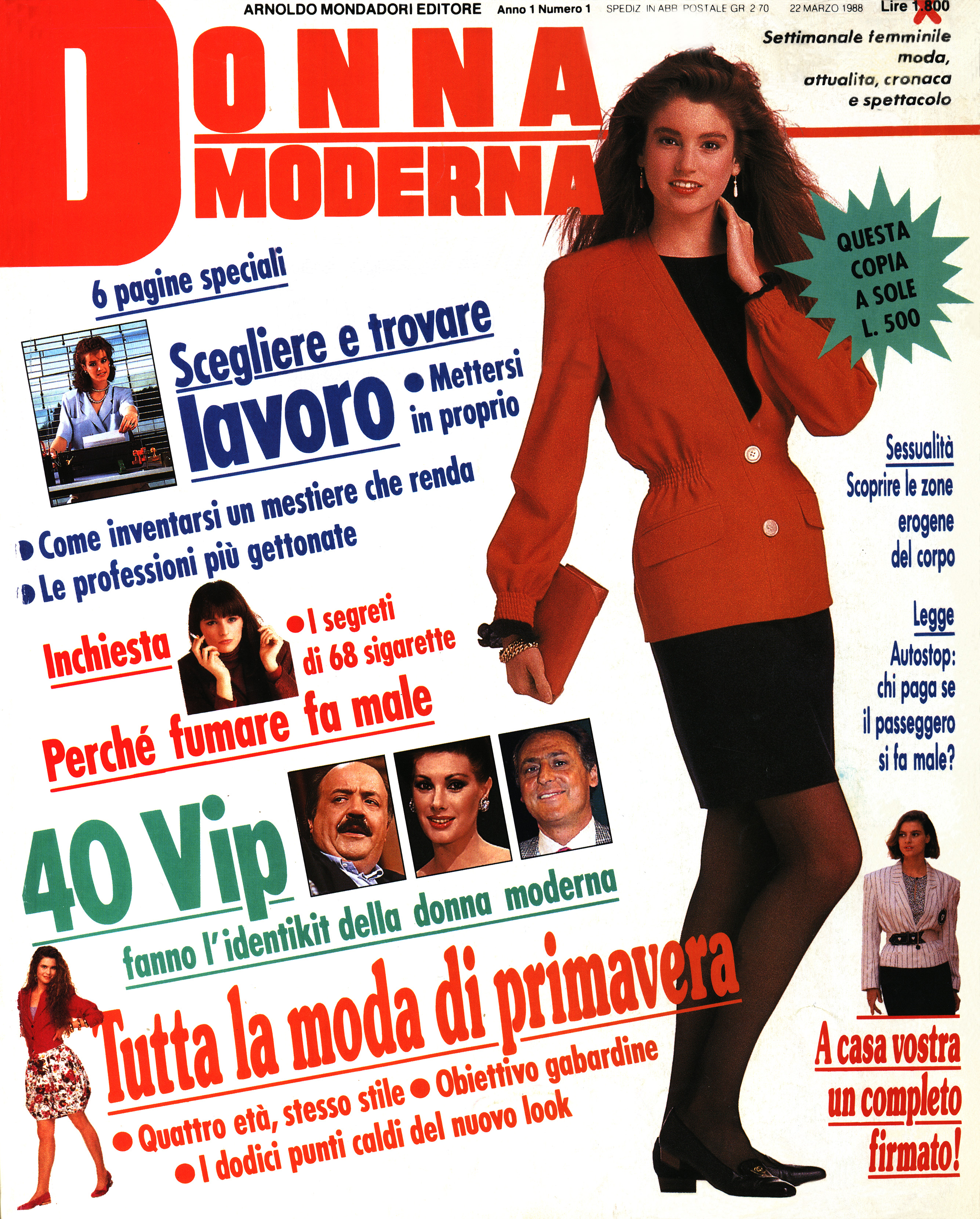
First edition of Donna Moderna dated 22 March 1988, featuring Tiffani Thiessen.

Donna Moderna covers articles on beauty, fashion, food, weddings and shopping. The magazine offers several supplements, including Donna Moderna Wellness, Casa Idea and Donna in Forma. The target audience of the magazine is women with the ages between 25 and 45.

== Circulation ==
The circulation of Donna Moderna was 618,739 copies from September 1993 to August 1994. In 2001 it was one of top 50 women's magazine worldwide with a circulation of 618,000 copies. From January to August 2003 the magazine had a circulation of 561,000 copies. Its circulation fell to 502,000 copies in 2004. The circulation of the weekly was 497,787 copies in 2007.

In 2010 Donna Moderna sold 422,585 copies.

== See also ==
- List of magazines in Italy
