= Mondadori Palace =

Concrete building designed by Brazilian architect Oscar Niemeyer in Milan, Italy

- Palazzo Mondadori
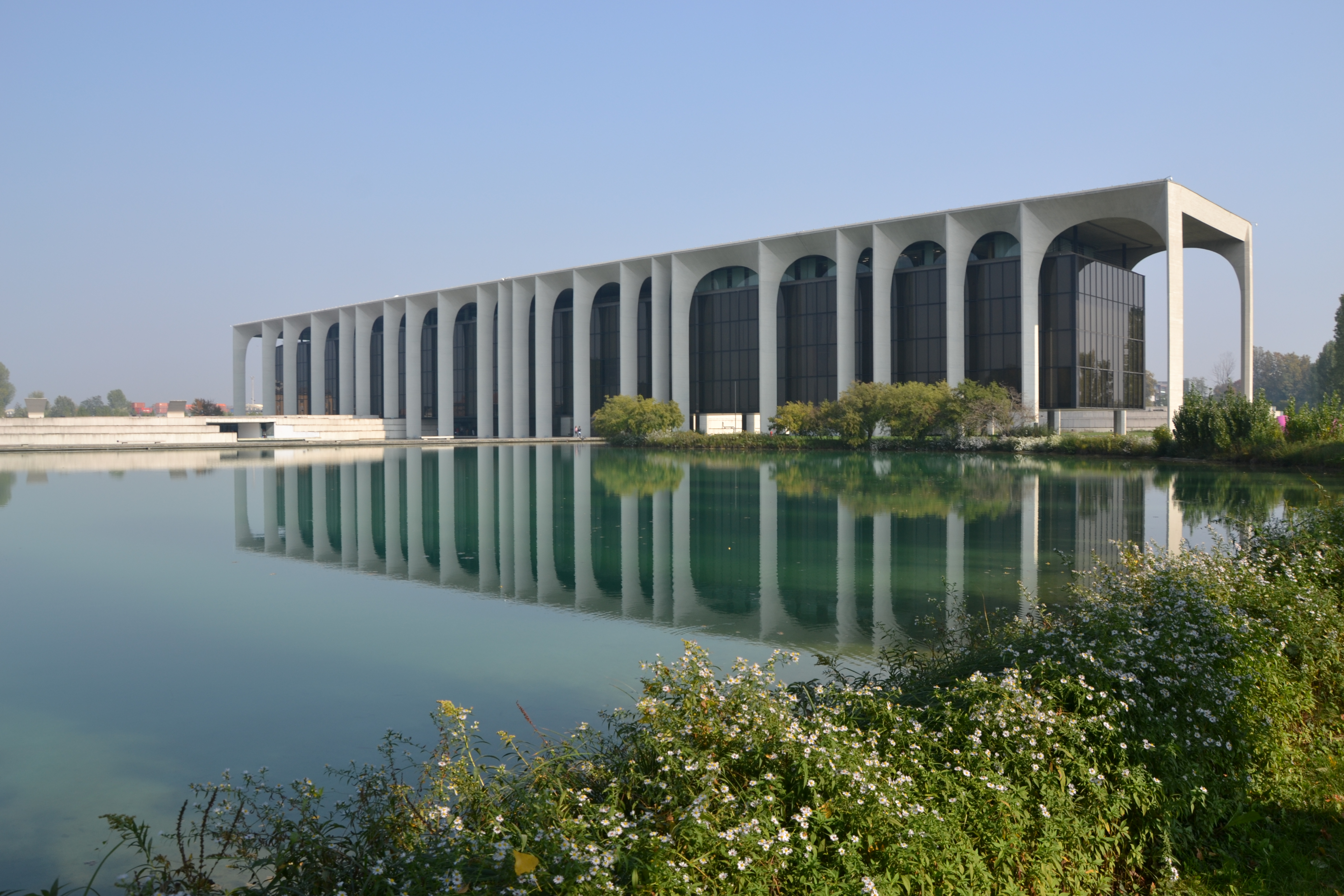

General information
- Architectural style: Modernist
- Classification: Office
- Location: Segrate, Italy
- Address: Via Mondadori 1
- Country: Italy
- Coordinates: 45.47457°N 9.29885°E
- Year(s) built: 1970–1975
- Opened: 1975
- Client: Arnoldo Mondadori Editore
- Height: 13m

Technical details
- Structural system: Reinforced concrete (arches); steel suspension (office block)
- Floor count: 5

Design and construction
- Architect(s): Oscar Niemeyer
- Structural engineer: Bruno Contarini

The Mondadori Palace (Italian: Palazzo Mondadori) is an office building located in Segrate on the outskirts of Milan, Italy. Designed by Brazilian architect Oscar Niemeyer, it was built between 1970 and 1975 to serve as the headquarters for Arnoldo Mondadori Editore, one of Italy's largest publishing companies.

Considered one of Niemeyer's most important works in Europe, the building features his characteristically curved, sculptural forms and represents an evolution of ideas first explored in the Itamaraty Palace, the Ministry of Foreign Affairs headquarters located in Brasilia. The Mondadori Palace is acclaimed for its structural audacity and monumental presence, with a cantilevered glass office block suspended under gigantic parabolic arches of raw concrete.

== History ==
The commission for the Mondadori Palace came about after Giorgio Mondadori, then president of the publishing company, visited Niemeyer's Ministry of Foreign Affairs in Brasilia in 1965 and was impressed by its design. At the time, Mondadori was seeking to construct a new headquarters building as the company had grown substantially during Italy's post-war economic boom, increasing its number of employees from 335 to 3,000 between 1950 and 1965.

Niemeyer was hired to design the new building in 1968, and produced an initial sinuous scheme reminiscent of his Copan building in São Paulo. However, the final design was for a long rectangular block with a distinctive concrete colonnade. Construction started in 1970 on a 36 hectare site in Segrate near the Milan airport, on land sold to insurance company Assicurazioni Generali who leased it back to Mondadori.

The building was structurally engineered by Bruno Contarini, who came up with an innovative suspension system to support the cantilevered glass box under Niemeyer's distinctive concrete arches after the original engineering scheme proved unworkable. The huge arches were poured using 25-meter-tall (82 ft) steel tube formwork, an engineering challenge requiring foundations elastic enough to bear the uneven load. The curtain wall glass facade was made of bronze-tinted glass on the exterior and clear glass inside with an air cavity between to reduce heat gain. After 4 years of complex construction, the headquarters was inaugurated in 1975.

== Design ==
The Mondadori Palace consists of three main elements emerging from an artificial lake designed by landscape architect Pietro Porcinai - a long five-story glass box containing the offices and newsrooms suspended under sweeping concrete arches, and two smaller curved ancillary structures with more organic shapes.

The inspiration from Niemeyer's Ministry of Foreign Affairs in Brasilia is apparent in the concrete arched colonnade, however the implementation is distinct. Rather than sitting directly on the ground, in the Mondadori Palace the 38m wide x 200m long glass box is fully suspended from the arches above, housing flexible open plan office space and floating 13m above the water. This produces a sense of lightness contrasting the solidity of the concrete.

The massive concrete arches have an irregular undulating rhythm unlike the regular modular bays in Brasilia. Niemeyer stated:

"Whoever visits the Mondadori headquarters is amazed because no one has ever seen a colonnade where the arches are different from each other."

This irregular colonnade has been likened to "musical rhythm" and is one of the most distinctive elements of Niemeyer's design.

The building reflects Niemeyer's "plastic symbolism", with the curving concrete structure fused seamlessly to the aesthetic form in a way that would have been impossible with traditional materials. The Mondadori Palace represents the productive collaboration between architect, structural engineer, and contractor that characterized many of Niemeyer's projects.

Sitting in the artificial lake in front of the entrance is a large steel sculpture entitled "Colonna dai grandi fogli" (in English: "Column of Large Sheets") by artist Arnaldo Pomodoro, dedicated to the power of communication.

== Significance ==
The Mondadori Palace is considered an important example of modernist architecture and one of Niemeyer's major works. Its design explores ideas of monumentality, plasticity, and the relationship between building and landscape with its lakeside setting. Architectural critics praise the structural audacity and aesthetic power of the huge cantilevered arches and suspended glass box.

Along with the French Communist Party headquarters, the Mondadori Palace represents the pinnacle of Niemeyer's European oeuvre and cemented his reputation internationally. It remains an iconic architectural landmark in Milan today.

In 2007 an expansion by architect Werner Tscholl that's adjacent to the Palace was completed, adding two new wings and renovating the Cascina Tregarezzo farmhouse.

== Gallery ==
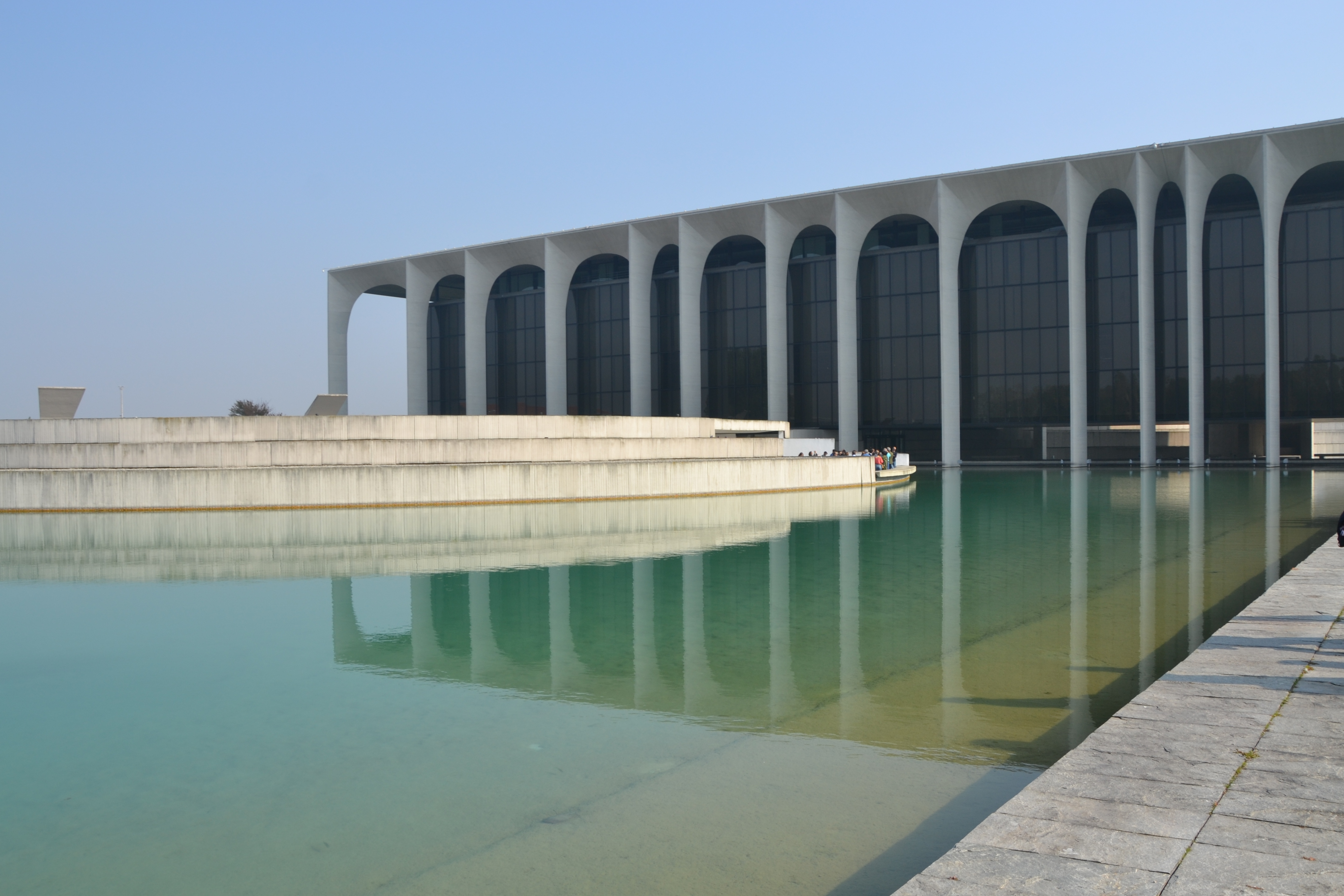
The building's façade and its colonnade with arches of varying spans

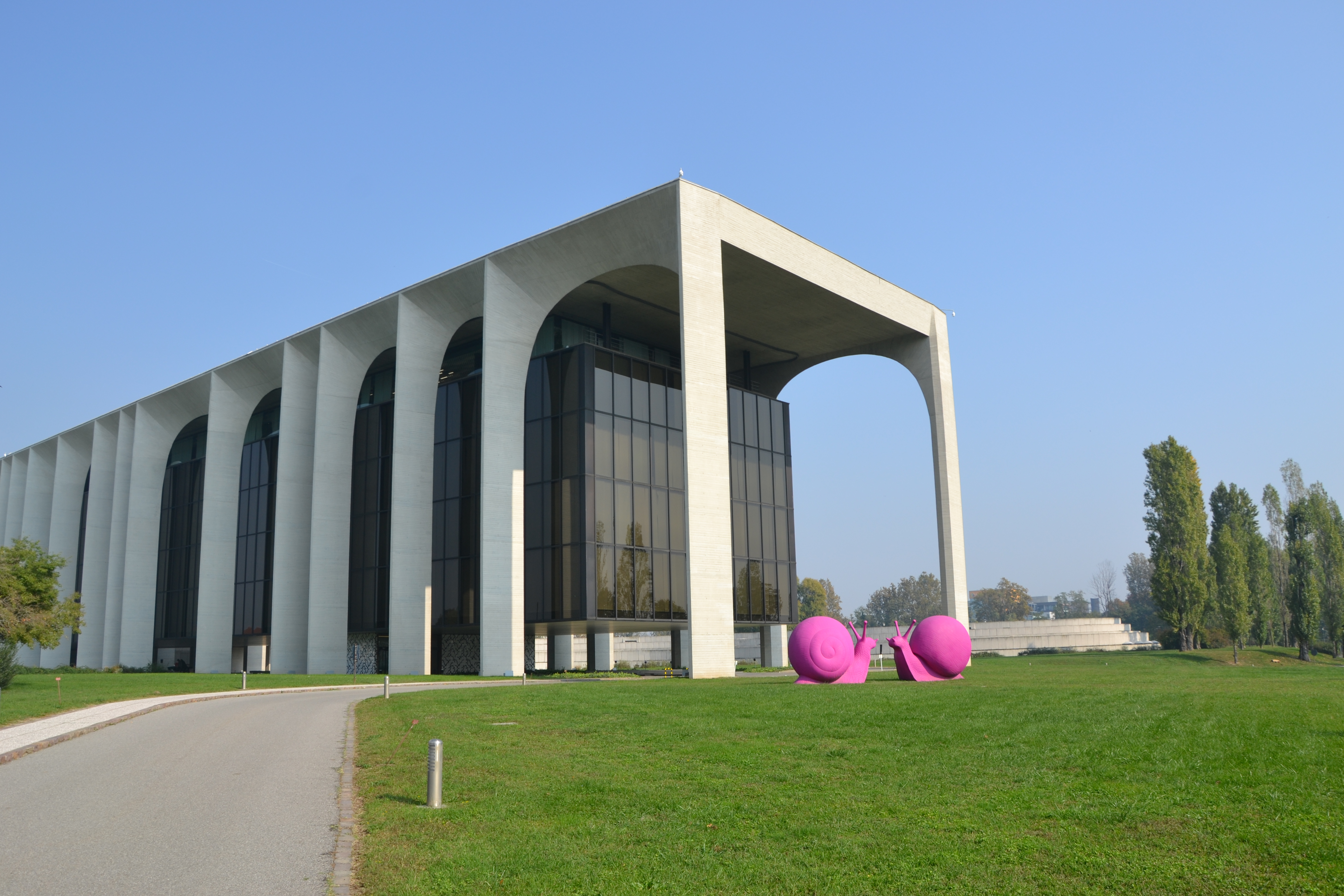
A porte-cochère at the building's entrance

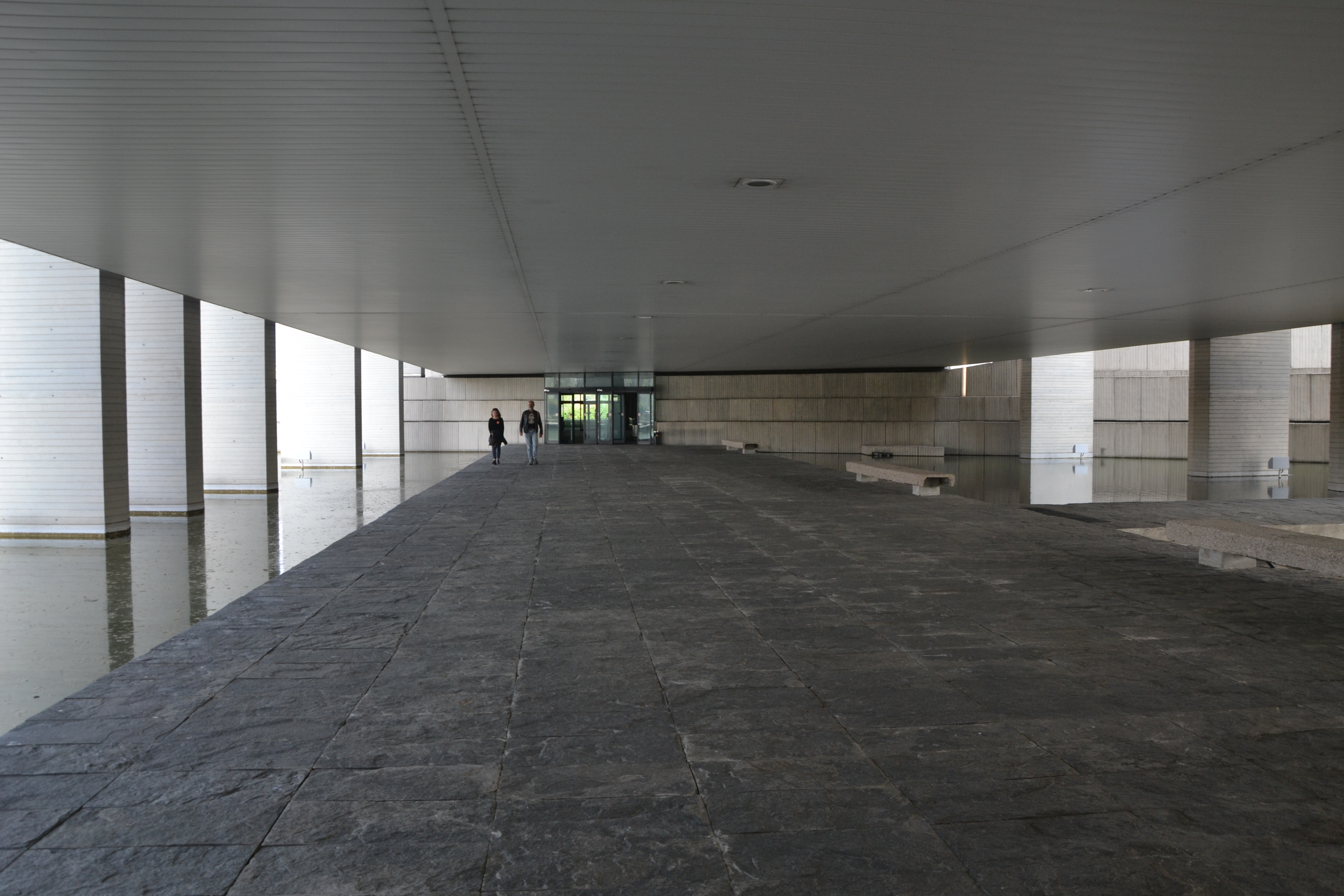
The open-floored ground level beneath the suspended offices

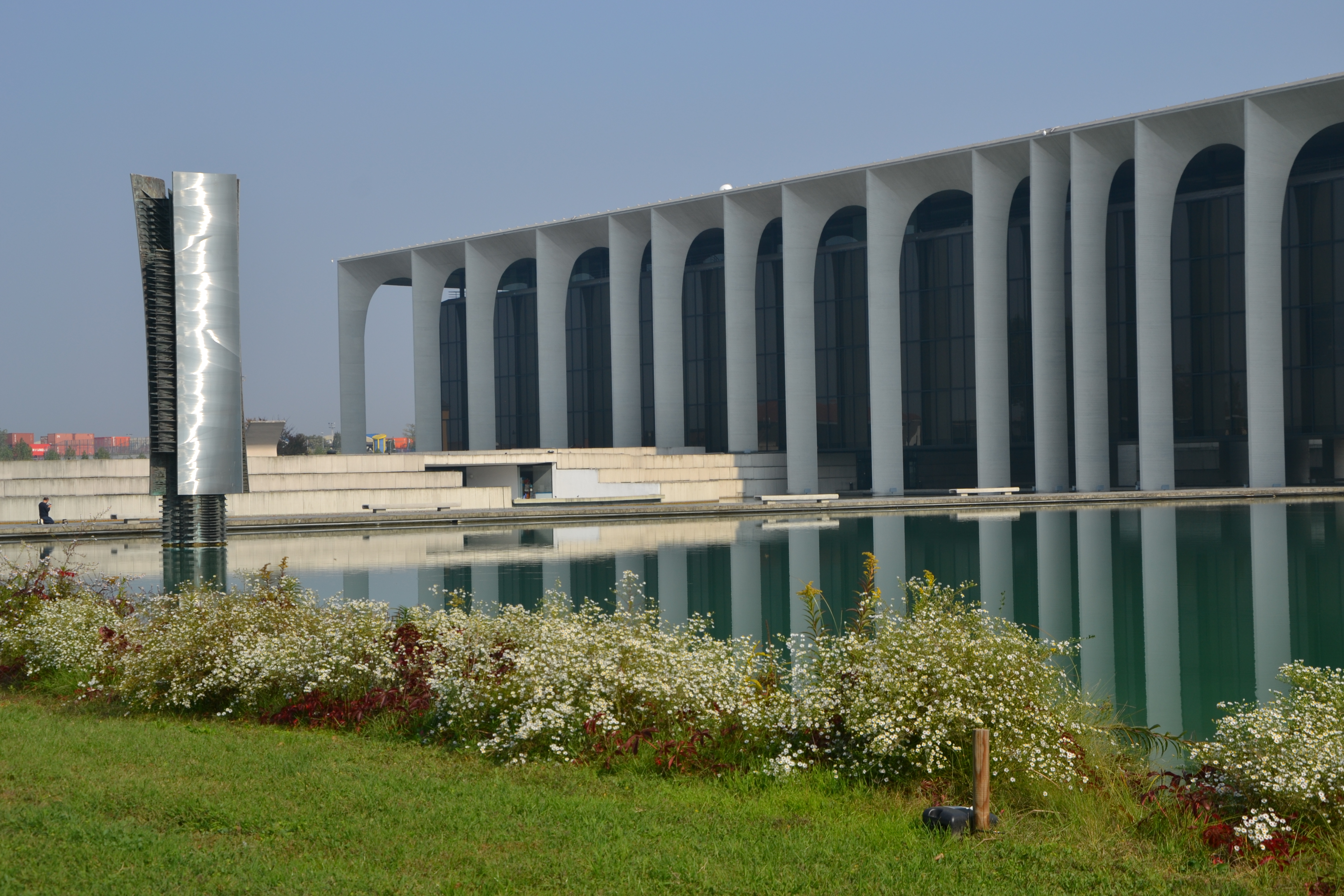
The "Colonna dai grandi fogli" sculpture by Arnaldo Pomodoro hanging over the reflective pool in front of the building
