= Aut Aut =

Philosophy magazine in Italy

- Editor: Pier Aldo Rovatti
- Former editors: Enzo Paci
- Categories: Philosophy magazine
- Frequency: Weekly
- Founder: Enzo Paci
- Founded: 1951; 75 years ago
- Country: Italy
- Based in: Milan
- Language: Italian
- Website: Aut Aut
- ISSN: 0005-0601
- OCLC: 1788648

Aut Aut is a critical philosophy and literary magazine published in Milan, Italy. Its name is of Latin origin and refers to existential choice and also, to Søren Kierkegaard's either/or conceptualization.

== History and profile ==
Subtitled Rivista di filosofia e di cultura, Aut Aut was founded in 1951 by Enzo Paci. Enzo Paci was also the editor-in-chief of the magazine until his death in 1976. The magazine is based in Milan.

Aut Aut has a phenomenological and existentialist orientation. The magazine covers articles on philosophy, literature, sociology, linguistics and also, on architecture and urbanism.

Gillo Dorfles is among the most significant former contributors. Roberto Sanesi started his career as a critic for the magazine in the 1950s. Pier Aldo Rovatti, who was on the editorial board of the magazine between 1974 and 1976, became the editor after Paci. During that period it became a significant forum for the discussions of Marxism and poststructuralism. Afterwards it continued to be published as a critical magazine.

== See also ==
- List of magazines in Italy
