= Cipria =

Italian women's magazine

Cover from March 2007

Cipria is an Italian monthly women's magazine published in Milan, Italy.

== History and profile ==
Cipria was founded in 1994 and published in Milan by Sfera Editore, part of RCS MediaGroup’s RCS Periodici. It specializes in coverage of make-up and related fashion and beauty topics, carries large amounts of advertising and devotes much space to the horoscope.

The magazine has a cover price of one euro and can be purchased from news-stands; however it is also given away free to customers buying cosmetics and similar items from perfumeries and beauty centres.

== See also ==
- List of magazines in Italy
