= Diario (magazine) =

Italian News Magazine

- Categories: News magazine
- Frequency: weekly, fortnightly, monthly
- First issue: 23 October 1996
- Final issue: December 2009
- Company: Editoriale Diario Srl
- Country: Italy
- Based in: Via Melzo, Milan
- Language: Italian
- Website: diario.it (archived)

Diario, also known as Diario della Settimana, was an Italian news magazine published between 1996 and 2009 in Milan, Italy.

== History and profile ==
Diario was first published on 23 October 1996 as a weekly linked to the daily newspaper l'Unità. Enrico Deaglio, Luca Formenton and Amato Mattia were the founders of the magazine. On 8 September 2008 Massimo Rebotti, previously of Radio Popolare, became the editor-in-chief.

Diario provided news stories based on investigative journalism. Enzo Baldon, an Italian journalist working for the magazine was killed in Iraq in August 2004.

In 1997 the magazine became independent of l’Unità and on Friday 7 September, after 567 issues, it became a fortnightly: a state of affairs which lasted for 28 issues and until 6 March 2009. From the issue of 3 April 2009, Diario became a monthly, with each issue being devoted to a particular subject. The magazine ceased print publication after the issue of December 2009.

The periodical achieved great successes with monographic issues such as 'Memoria' and 'Berlusconeide'; in 2006 and 2007 it was at the centre of large-scale polemics which resulted from its investigations into the alleged rigging of the 2006 elections. On 5 December 2002 Diario, along with the Serbian daily Danas, received in Paris the Prix de Le Guide de la Presse.

== See also ==
- List of magazines published in Italy

== Notes ==
This article originated as a translation of this version of its counterpart in the Italian-language Wikipedia.
