= Il Monello =

Italian comic magazine (1933–1990)

- Categories: Comic magazine
- Frequency: Weekly
- Founded: 1933
- Final issue: October 1990
- Country: Italy
- Based in: Milan
- Language: Italian

Il Monello (meaning The Rascal in English) was a weekly comic magazine for kids and teens published in Italy from 1933 to 1990.

== History and profile ==
Il Monello was founded in 1933 by the Del Duca brothers and initially offered only works by Italian cartoonists, introducing several American comic series just in 1936. The magazine was published weekly and was based in Milan.

Considered a mix between Corriere dei Piccoli and Jumbo, Il Monello ceased publication in 1939 and many of its interrupted series continued on another Del Duca's magazine for kids, Intrepido. After a 14-year hiatus, Il Monello resumed publication in 1953, achieving a significant commercial success thanks to adventure series such as Forza John and Rocky Rider and to several humorous comic strips, notably Pedrito el Drito and Superbone. Since the early 1970s the magazine targeted a more mature audience and started including regular columns on sport, music and entertainment. The weekly had a circulation of 231,992 copies in 1984.

In 1989 it changed its name on Monello Okay!, then it finally closed in October 1990.

== See also ==
- List of magazines published in Italy

== Notes ==
- Media related to Il Monello at Wikimedia Commons
