= Hurrà Juventus =

Italian sports magazine

- Editor: Cantelli Editore S.p.A.
- Categories: Football
- Frequency: Monthly
- First issue: 10 June 1915; 109 years ago
- Country: Italy
- Based in: Turin, Italy
- Language: Italian
- Website: www.juventus.com

Hurrà Juventus, formerly known as HJ Magazine, is an Italian sport magazine entirely dedicated to the football club Juventus FC Founded by Editor and first director Corradino Corradini during the club's Presidential Committee of War composed by Gioacchino Armano (one of the founders), Sandro Zambelli and Fernando Nizza (a former Juventus footballer), was first published at Turin on 10 June 1915 as a newspaper to distribute among club's players, workers and fans in World War I.

The oldest publication of its kind in the country was discontinued in October 1916, due to lack of raw materials as consequence of the World War I, but the prints again in 1919 until 1927.

Hurrà Juventus is currently the best selling football club magazine in Italy (60,000 copies monthly). The magazine is published by Cantelli Editore S.p.A.

== See also ==
List of magazines published in Italy
