= Le Ore =

Italian weekly news magazine published between 1953 and 1994

- Cover of Le Ore featuring actress Elsa Martinelli, 30 May 1977.
- Categories: Newsmagazine
- Frequency: Weekly
- Founded: 1953
- Final issue: 1994
- Country: Italy
- Based in: Milan
- Language: Italian

Le Ore (meaning The Hours in English) was an Italian weekly news magazine published between 1953 and 1994 in Milan, Italy.

== History and profile ==
The magazine was founded in Milan in April 1953 as a weekly political, cultural and literary magazine and was first edited by Salvato Cappelli. In 1962 the magazine was acquired by Dino De Laurentiis and the editorial staff was moved to Rome; Vittorio Bonicelli was appointed as the new editor, the number of pages was increased from 68 to 80, and the magazine started giving more room to cinema reports and photoshoots. In 1966 Le Ore was acquired by Golden Arrow Publishing, with Gérard Méssadie appointed as editor-in-chief.

After a three-year hiatus, in 1970 the magazine was acquired by Saro Balsamo Editore and relaunched as a "political, news, cultural and costume magazine", with Francesco Cardella serving as the editorial director. In March 1971, a spin-off monthly magazine, Le Ore Mese, was launched.

In 1973, the magazine gradually started hosting erotic contents, and in 1977 it eventually became a pornographic magazine. In the early 1980s, Le Ore had a large commercial success, mostly thanks to many celebrities posing in erotic and sometimes explicit situations in photoshoots, as well as thanks to the regular presence of the Italian hardcore cinema major stars Ilona Staller, of whom the magazine also published comic series inspired to her, and Moana Pozzi. During this period, it also regularly presented other erotic comic series, often created by Aldo Rapetti and Otello Perandin.

Because of the increasing competition of pornographic videotapes, in the late 1980s the circulation started to decline, and the magazine eventually closed in 1996.

== See also ==
- List of magazines in Italy
