= Archeo (magazine) =

Archeology magazine in Italy

- Categories: Archeology magazine
- Frequency: Monthly
- First issue: March 1985
- Country: Italy
- Based in: Rome
- Language: Italian
- Website: Archeo
- ISSN: 1120-4559
- OCLC: 613487224

Archeo is a monthly archeology magazine based in Rome, Italy. The magazine was first published in March 1985. It features articles on archaeological news. As of 2011, Andreas Steiner was the editor of the magazine.

== See also ==
- List of magazines in Italy
