= Lombard (magazine) =

Bimonthly business magazine published in Italy

- Editor: Paolo Panerai
- Categories: Business magazine
- Frequency: Bimonthly
- Publisher: Lombard Editori SRL
- Founded: 1987; 39 years ago
- Company: Class Editori
- Country: Italy
- Based in: Milan
- Language: English

Lombard is an English language bimonthly finance and business magazine published in Milan, Italy.

== History and profile ==
Lombard was started in 1987. The magazine is part of Class Pubblicità S.p.A, a subsidiary of the Class Editori Group. Paolo Panerai is the editor and head of the publisher of the magazine, Lombard Editori SRL. The magazine is based in Milan and is published bimonthly. It is distributed to subscribers.

Frequent topics covered by Lombard are privatization, financial markets, products and services, private banking, private equity, insurance and real estate. The target audience of the magazine include entrepreneurs, managers, finance analysts and professionals working at firms, banks, financial companies and other institutions in Italy and in other countries.

== See also ==
- List of magazines in Italy
