= Jack (Italian magazine) =

Italian technology magazine (2000–2012)

- Frequency: Monthly
- First issue: October 2000
- Final issue Number: January 2012; 151/152
- Company: Gruner + Jahr; Arnoldo Mondadori Editore
- Country: Italy
- Based in: Milan, Italy
- Language: Italian
- Website: http://www.jacktech.it/

Jack was a popular Italian-language technology magazine which was published in Italy from October 2000 to January 2012 by Arnoldo Mondadori Editore in a joint venture with the German publisher Gruner + Jahr. It was one of the most popular technology magazines in Italy.

In 2007 the circulation of Jack was 129,729 copies.

== See also ==
List of magazines published in Italy
