= Gerarchia =

Italian fascist magazine

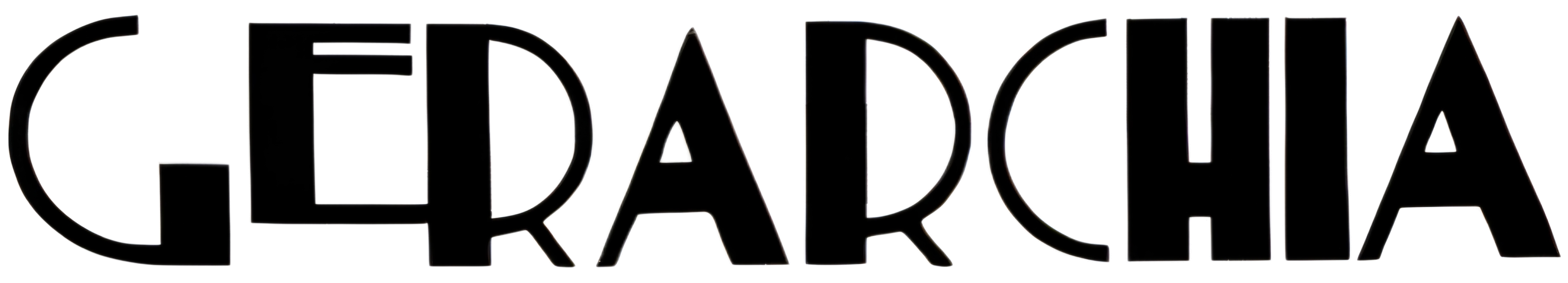

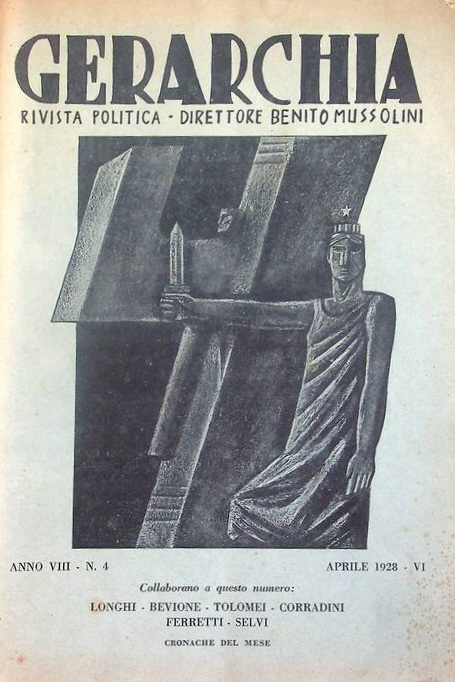
- Editor: Margherita Sarfatti
- Frequency: Monthly
- Founder: Benito Mussolini
- First issue: January 1922
- Final issue: July 1943
- Country: Italy
- Based in: Milan
- Language: Italian
- OCLC: 1751112

Gerarchia (Italian: Hierarchy) was a monthly fascist magazine/journal published in Milan, Italy, between 1922 and 1943.

== History and profile ==
Gerarchia was founded in Milan in January 1922 by Benito Mussolini. The magazine was the unofficial organ of the regime at that time and was instrumental in making Italy a totalitarian state.

It published monthly reviews. Mussolini was listed on the magazine's masthead as its editor-in-chief. However, the magazine's actual editor, from its founding, was Margherita Sarfatti. Her name did not appear on the magazine until its February 1925 edition where she was listed simply as "direttore responsabile" (Italian: the personal legally responsible for the magazine).

The magazine ceased publication in July 1943.

== See also ==
- List of magazines published in Italy
