= Protecta (magazine) =

Italian magazine

- Editor: Tony Colomba
- Staff writers: Paola Villani
- Categories: Newsmagazine
- Frequency: Bimonthly
- Founded: 1987; 39 years ago
- Company: Gruppo editoriale Ecoedizioni Internazionali
- Country: Italy
- Based in: Rome
- Language: Italian
- Website: https://www.protectaweb.it/
- ISSN: 1121-3124

Protecta is a technical, political, cultural, social and economic news magazine published bimonthly in Italy.

== History and profile ==
Protecta was first published in 1987 by Rocco Colomba. The paper is based in Rome, and the editor is Tony Colomba. Protecta began publishing online articles in 2009 under the PROTECTAweb.it domain.

Given its format, which includes long essays and articles, the journal tends to cater to an intellectual elite. Many social scientists and men and women of science and other leading figures have written on this paper, including Jacques Barrot, Edward Chaplin, Stavros Dimas, Jacques Diouf, Al Gore, Ban Ki-moon, Kōichirō Matsuura, E. Morley, A. Steiner.

Protecta has an average circulation of 60,000 copies. In 2008, some issues sold more than 100,000 copies.

== See also ==
- List of magazines in Italy
