= Comunità =

Italian cultural magazine (1946–1960)

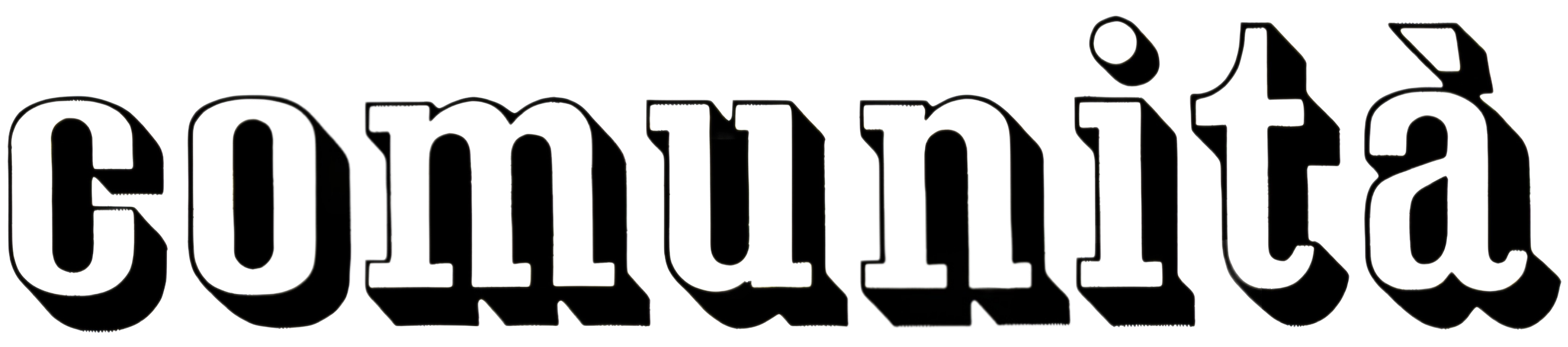
- Categories: Cultural magazine
- Frequency: Weekly; Bimonthly
- Publisher: Edizioni di Comunità
- Founder: Adriano Olivetti
- Founded: 1946
- First issue: March 1946
- Final issue: December 1960
- Country: Italy
- Based in: Rome
- Language: Italian

Comunità (Italian: Community) was a cultural magazine published in Rome, Italy. The magazine was in circulation between 1946 and 1960.

== History and profile ==
Comunità was established by Adriano Olivetti in 1946. The first issue of the magazine appeared in March that year. It was a cultural publication of the Community Movement, which was also founded by Olivetti. The magazine was based in Rome and was published by Edizioni di Comunità on a weekly basis. It was also headquartered in Milan and was published on a bimonthly basis in the mid-1950s. It featured articles on major political and cultural topics. It also covered the topics of city planning, designing, literature, music, cinema and figurative arts.

Comunità supported the development of the community. The magazine was most read by people interested in social and cultural events and in political philosophy. It was frequently distributed free to libraries and several institutions. Its paid circulation was nearly 1,000 copies in 1955. The magazine ceased publication in December 1960.

The complete collection of the magazine is available at the Library of the Adriano Olivetti Foundation.

== See also ==
- List of magazines in Italy
