= Circoli =

Italian literary magazine (1931–1936)

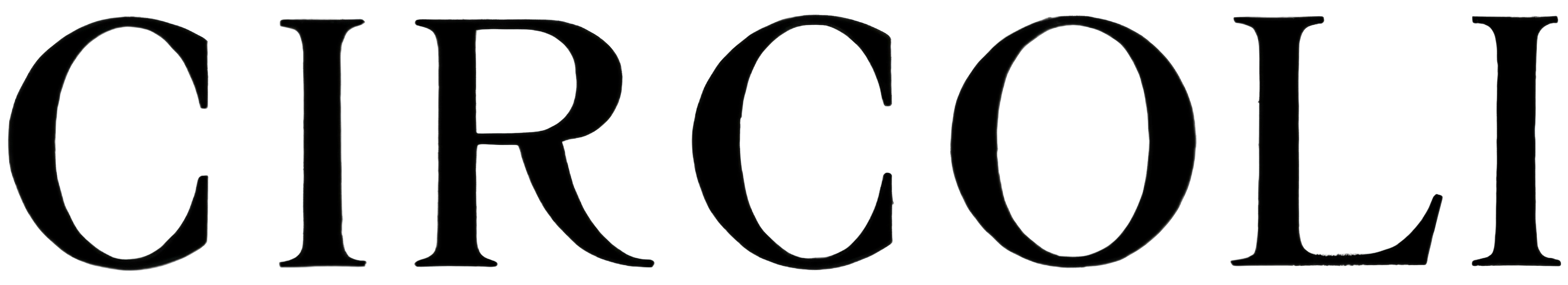
- Categories: Literary magazine
- Frequency: Bimonthly (1931–1935); Monthly (1935–1939)
- Publisher: Grafico editoriale
- Founder: Adriano Grande
- Founded: 1931
- First issue: January-February 1931
- Final issue Number: December 1939; 12
- Country: Italy
- Based in: Genoa
- Language: Italian
- ISSN: 2388-3812
- OCLC: 889585990

Circoli was a bimonthly literary magazine published in Genoa, Italy, between 1931 and 1936. It was described as one of the most distinguished European magazines in 1934.

== History and profile ==
Circoli was started in Genoa in 1931. Adriano Grande, an Italian poet, was the founder of the magazine, which intended to be the successor of Solaria, a literary magazine published in Turin and Florentine. Circoli was subtitled Rivista di Poesi (Italian: Poetry Magazine) and was published on a bimonthly basis. Its publisher was Grafico editoriale. From 1935 the frequency of the magazine became monthly.

Adriano Grande was also the director of the magazine, which published translations of the work by international authors, among others. Attilio Bertolucci, Salvatore Quasimodo and Ferdinando Agnoletti were some of its contributors. During its run the magazine was supported by the press office. In December 1939 the magazine was closed down with the publication of the twelfth issue.

== See also ==
- List of magazines in Italy
