= L'Audace =

Defunct children's magazine in Italy (1934–1944)

- Categories: Comic magazine
- Frequency: Weekly
- Publisher: S.A.E.V
- Founder: Lotario Vecchi
- Founded: 1934
- Final issue: 1944
- Language: Italian

L'Audace (Italian for "The Bold") was a weekly children and comic magazine published in Italy from 1934 to 1944.

== History and profile ==
Founded by Lotario Vecchi in January 1934, the magazine was published by S.A.E.V, except for a short time in which it was published by Mondadori. For its first sixty issues, it did not include comics, but only columns and illustrated short stories and novellas. It had initially a good commercial success, with an average circulation of about 180,000 copies per week. It introduced to the Italian audience several successful American comic series, notably Superman, Tarzan, Brick Bradford, Mandrake the Magician. It also included several Italian comic series, such as Dick Fulmine and Walter Molino's Capitan Audace.

== See also ==
- List of magazines in Italy
