= Forza Milan! =

Italian sports magazine

- Categories: Football
- Frequency: Monthly
- Founder: Gino Sansoni
- First issue: 1963
- Final issue: June 2018
- Company: Panini
- Country: Italy
- Based in: Milan, Lombardy
- Language: Italian
- Website: ForzaMilanOnLine.com
- ISSN: 1122-8059

Forza Milan! was a monthly Italian sports magazine entirely dedicated to the football club A.C. Milan. It existed between 1963 and 2018.

== History and profile ==
Forza Milan! was founded in 1963 by Italian journalist Gino Sansoni. The magazine published on a monthly basis. It featured articles, posters and photos of AC Milan players including both the first team players and the youth system kids, as well as club employees. It also featured anecdotes and famous episodes from the club's history. The last issue of the magazine published in June 2018 featuring Gennaro Gattuso on the cover.

== See also ==
- List of magazines published in Italy
