= Progetto Babele =

Progetto Babele is a tri-monthly, nonprofit literary magazine founded in Cork, Ireland by Marco Roberto Capelli. Founded in 2002, the magazine is available online as well as in a print medium. The magazine features short stories, articles, reviews, translations, and interviews about books, magazines, and literary websites.

In 2007, the magazine launched an audiobooks section on its website in which dramatized versions of short stories are published.

The magazine's website is multilingual, and has sub-sections in English, French, and Spanish.

With about 2,965 regular collaborations from authors, notable writers who have contributed to Progetto Babele include Corrado Augias, Valerio Evangelisti, Michael Hoeye, Fernando Sorrentino, Tullio Avoledo, and Arturo Pérez-Reverte.

== See also ==
- List of magazines in Italy
