= The Games Machine =

Italian video game magazine

- March 2009 issue
- Editor: Oscar Maeran
- Categories: Video game journalism
- Frequency: Monthly
- Circulation: 25.000
- First issue: September 1988
- Company: Aktia srl
- Country: Italy
- Based in: Milan, Italy
- Language: Italian
- Website: www.thegamesmachine.it
- ISSN: 1127-1221

The Games Machine, also known by the acronym TGM, is an Italian video game magazine that features previews, reviews, and cheat codes. It was initially launched in 1988.

== History ==
The Italian edition of the British magazine The Games Machine was launched by the Milan-based publishing company Xenia Edizioni in September 1988. The Italian edition proved far more successful, rapidly becoming one of the most popular video gaming magazines in Italy. TGM also featured a covermount disc during the majority of its existence. Its publication continued long past the shuttering of the British edition in 1990; thus, the Italian version of TGM featured original content from that point on. In November 2005 there was a change of ownership, as Xenia sold it to Future Media Italy, a division of Future Publishing. Future only held it for a brief time, selling it to the Italian publishing company Sprea Media Italy in January 2007.

In 2012, TGM became the only remaining Italian PC gaming magazine, having survived all its historical rivals: Zeta was shut down in March 2001, K in December 2003, and ultimately Giochi per il Mio Computer in August 2012. In August 2013, TGM celebrated its 300th issue and its 25th anniversary, becoming the second longest-running videogame magazine in the world behind the Japanese Famitsu, and the longest-running dedicated PC gaming magazine ever. The event also saw the relaunch of the magazine's website. In 2014, ownership of TGM was transferred to Aktia SRL. It has been published under Aktia ever since.

== See also ==
- List of magazines in Italy
