= Easy Milano =

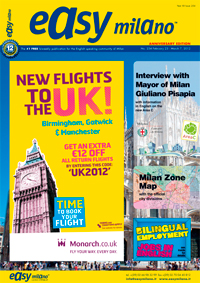
- 23 February 2012 cover
- Editor: Amie Louie
- Categories: Expatriate magazine
- Frequency: Fortnightly
- Founded: 2000
- Country: Italy
- Based in: Milan
- Language: English
- Website: http://www.easymilano.it

Easy Milano is a fortnightly magazine for the English speaking community of Milan. The publication lists businesses and associations relevant to international expats, as well as bilingual Italians.

== History and profile ==
Easy Milano was founded in 1999 by Editor in Chief Amie Louie and partner Aaron Pugliesi. In February 2000, it published its first issue and launched its website, which makes it the longest running English language publication catering to expatriates residing in Milan.

Easy Milano is published by its parent company B Easy S.r.l with the endorsement of the Comune di Milano (City of Milan) and the Provincia di Milano (Province of Milan).

== Editors ==
- Amie Louie (1999 to present)

== Content ==
In addition to classified ad listings, Easy Milano releases articles and announcements from consulates, embassies and trade offices of English speaking nations present in Italy; such as the British Consulate, UK Trade & Investment and Embassy of the United States, Rome in Milan. It also interviews many influential figures, including politicians and members from the diplomatic community such as former mayor of Milan Letizia Moratti, former mayor of Milan Giuliano Pisapia, The British Ambassador to Italy, Edward Chaplin and former United States Ambassador to Italy Ronald P. Spogli.

== Events ==
Easy Milano has organized many Anglo-themed events usually including charity fundraisers, such as J4 Milan, the U.S. Independence Day Celebrations, as well as high profile events such as the U.S. Election Night Party in 2008. These events have been frequently covered by national media in Italy such as Rai 3, Sky TG24, Telenova, La Repubblica and Il Giornale.

== See also ==
- List of magazines published in Italy
