= Famiglia Cristiana =

Italian weekly news magazine

- Editor: Antonio Sciortino
- Categories: Newsmagazine
- Frequency: Weekly
- Circulation: 544,576 (2010)
- Publisher: Periodici San Paolo
- Founded: 1931; 95 years ago
- First issue: 25 December 1931
- Company: Edizioni San Paolo
- Country: Italy
- Based in: Alba/Milan, Italy
- Language: Italian
- Website: Famiglia Cristiana

Famiglia Cristiana (meaning The Christian family in English) is an Italian weekly magazine published in Alba, Italy. The magazine is a Catholic news magazine and has been in circulation since 1931.

== History and profile ==
Famiglia Cristiana was founded by Pia Società San Paolo, a Catholic foundation, in Milan in 1931. The first issue appeared on 25 December 1931. Its original aim was to guide Catholics living in the rural and provincial north Italy to successfully cope with the spiritual and practical challenges of modern life. During its early years it was a local magazine targeting women. The magazine was temporarily suspended in the course of World War II. In 1954 its coverage expanded to include articles about food, fashion, politics and religion. However, its readers remained to be mainly women who resided in the northern Italy and were from the middle class in the urban and rural regions.

During the 1980s, Famiglia Cristiana was one of the Italian periodicals that the Piano di Rinascita Democratica (Democratic rebirth plan) of Licio Gelli wanted to subject to the control of the Masonic Lodge P2, affiliated to the Grand Orient of Italy.

The magazine is owned by Edizioni San Paolo, a Roman Catholic publishing group and is published by Periodici San Paolo on a weekly basis. It has its headquarters in Alba.

In 1955 Famiglia Cristiana became an illustrated weekly magazine.

== Circulation ==
Famiglia Cristiana enjoyed higher levels of circulation from the late 1950s. In 1961 the magazine sold 1,000,000 copies, and its circulation was 1.7 million copies in the late 1960s.

The magazine had a circulation of 1,123,071 copies in 1984. The weekly sold 1,070,652 copies in the period between September 1993 and August 1994. In the mid-1990s the magazine had the highest circulation among other Catholic periodicals in Italy.

Famiglia Cristiana sold 895,000 copies in 2001. The 2003 circulation of the weekly was 742,000 copies. Its circulation was 778,000 copies in 2004.

The circulation of Famiglia Cristiana was 644,316 copies in 2007. In 2010 the circulation of the magazine fell to 544,576 copies.

== See also ==
- List of magazines published in Italy
