= Gente (magazine) =

Italian current affairs magazine

- Categories: Current affairs magazine Gossip magazine
- Frequency: Weekly
- Circulation: 332,340 (2010)
- Founder: Edilio Rusconi
- Founded: 1957; 68 years ago
- Company: Hearst Magazines
- Country: Italy
- Based in: Milan
- Language: Italian
- Website: Gente

Gente (Italian: People) is a popular and long-running Italian weekly current affairs and celebrity gossip magazine.

== History and profile ==
Gente was launched in Milan in 1957. Its founder and publisher was Edilio Rusconi, an Italian journalist, writer, publisher and film producer. The magazine was the flagship of Rusconi Group. The magazine was part of Rusconi Group until 1999 when the Group was acquired by Hachette Filipacchi Médias, a subsidiary of Lagardère SCA.

The magazine was published by Hachette Rusconi under the Hachette Filipacchi Médias ownership. It was owned by Hachette Filipacchi Médias until 2011 when it was acquired by Hearst Magazines. It is published on a weekly basis.

== Circulation ==
In 1964 the circulation of Gente was 331,000 copies which rose to 390,000 copies in 1968.

Gente had a circulation of 667,553 copies in 1984. It rose to 769,185 copies between September 1993 and August 1994. In 2000 the magazine had a circulation of 690,000 copies. The 2004 circulation of the magazine was 573,000 copies. It was 411,425 copies in 2007. Its circulation was 332,340 copies in 2010.

== See also ==
- List of magazines in Italy
