= PlayStation Magazine (Italy) =

Italian video game magazine

- Categories: Games magazine
- Frequency: Monthly
- Founded: 1997
- First issue: September 1997
- Company: Sprea Media Italy
- Country: Italy
- Based in: Milan, Italy
- Language: Italian
- ISSN: 1125-484X

PlayStation Magazine, also known by the acronym PSM, is an Italian video game magazine specializing in all Sony video game consoles and handheld gaming platforms. The magazine features previews, reviews, and cheat codes for Sony games.

== History ==
Launched in 1997 as the Italian version of an American magazine of the same name, the magazine was owned by a division of Future Publishing, Future Media Italy, until March 2007 when Sprea Media Italy acquired it. The first issue of the magazine was published in September 1997.
