= Micron (magazine) =

Micron is an Italian language free magazine, which covers articles about ecology, science and knowledge.

== History and profile ==
Micron was started in 2004. The magazine is published by the Regional Environmental Protection Agency (ARPA) in the Umbria region. The magazine is distributed free of charge. It features articles concerning the relationships between economy, ecology, development, growth, environment and health. The goal of the magazine is to improve awareness about significant environmental issues. It has several supplements, one of which targets children and youth, Micron Junior, which was established in 2013 and is published annually.
