= Sapere =

Popular science magazine in Italy

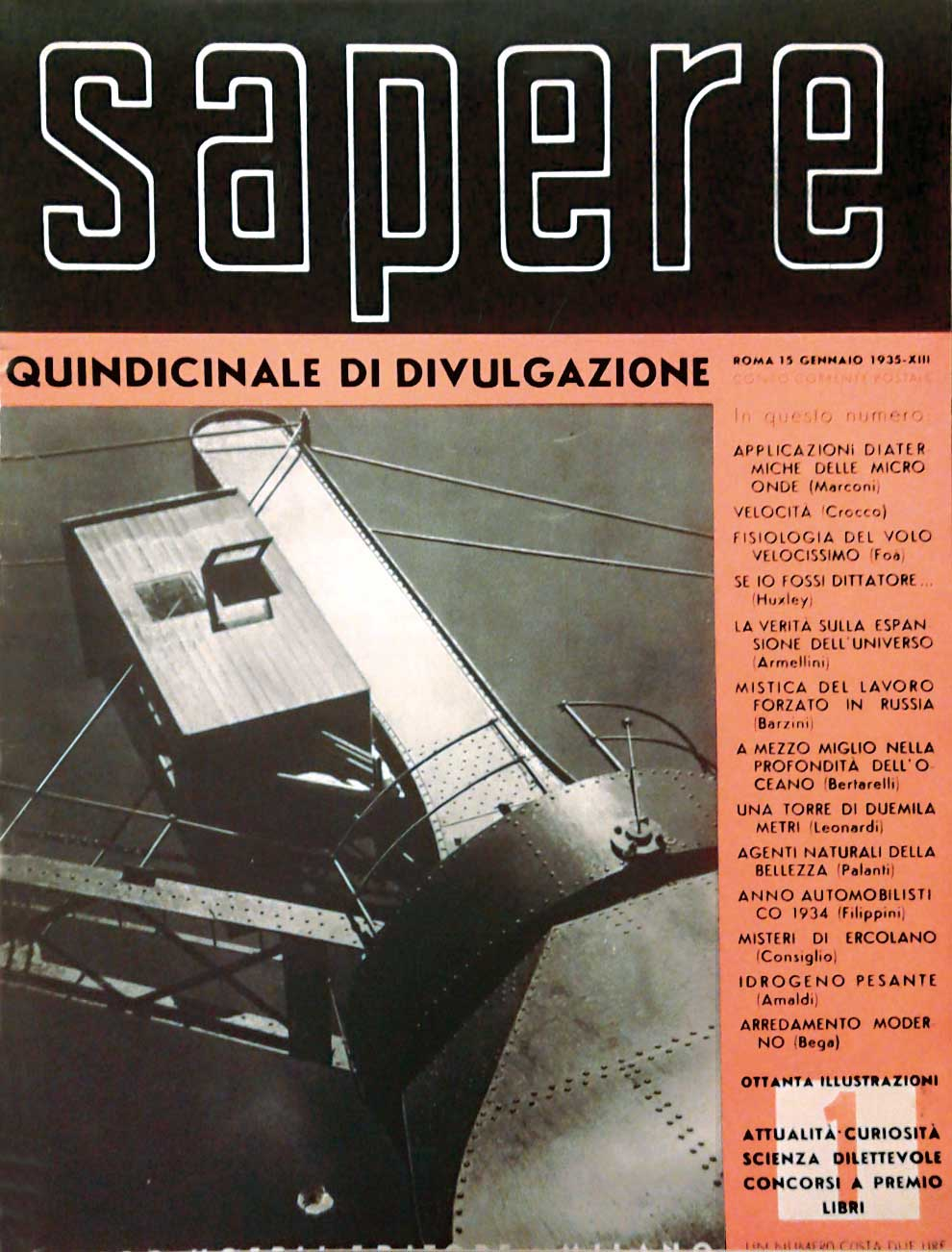
- Cover page of the issue 1
- Categories: Popular science magazine
- Frequency: Bimonthly
- Founded: 1935
- Country: Italy
- Based in: Rome
- Language: Italian
- ISSN: 0036-4681
- OCLC: 1020137624

Sapere (Italian: Knowledge) is a popular science magazine that has been in circulation since 1935 and is based in Rome, Italy. It is one of the earliest Italian publications in its category.

== History and profile ==
Sapere was established by the Italian publisher Ulrico Hoepli in 1935. The magazine is published by the Edizioni Dedalo on a bimonthly basis. Sapere came out monthly during the 1970s. It is based in Rome.

Sapere features articles on science, news, reviews, and contains graphic novels and photography. The magazine has used extensive illustrations and photographs since its start in 1935. In the 1940s its target audience was those who were interested in the interdisciplinarity of scientific knowledge and modernist culture.

== Contributors and content ==
One of the early contributors of the magazine was Guido Landra who wrote articles containing the results of his race studies. Its other contributors included Enrico Fermi, Guglielmo Marconi, Adriano Buzzati-Traverso, Giulio Maccacaro and Carlo Bernardini who were scientists.

Sapere covered propaganda materials in the Fascist period one of which was about Japanese identity culture. The magazine featured an extract from Beaumont Newhall’s article entitled The New Abstract Vision in 1947.

A group of the writers from Il manifesto joined the magazine in the mid-1970s. They were led by Giulio Alfredo Maccacaro who was made editor-in-chief of Sapere. The members of the group published articles about the history and critics of science from 1978. Another topic of their articles was the interaction between politics and ecology which contributed to raise the level of the political-ecological awareness among Italians. The group domainated the magazine until 1982. In the 1980s Massimo Pigliucci was a regular contributor of Sapere.
