= Noi Testarde =

Italian feminist magazine

Noi Testarde was a feminist magazine published in Italy. Its title means We stubborn women in English indicating the radical feminist approach of the magazine. Although the magazine did not enjoy higher levels of circulation, it was one of the publications which helped autonomist feminism in Italy and abroad to build a legacy.
