= Inter Football Club =

Italian monthly sports magazine (1960–2009)

- Categories: Football
- Frequency: Monthly
- Founded: 1960
- Final issue: 2009
- Country: Italy
- Based in: Milan, Lombardy
- Language: Italian

Inter Football Club was an Italian sports magazine entirely dedicated to the football club Inter. It was released on a monthly basis. It featured articles, posters and photos of Inter Milan players including both the first and junior team players, as well as some of the club employees. It also featured anecdotes and famous episodes from the club's history. Initially edited by Susanna Wermelinger, the magazine ceased to be published in 2009 when Francesco Sordano was at the helm. In 2017 the magazine was replaced by a weekly publication called Match Day Programme, which is issued every weekend when Internazionale is playing.

== See also ==
- List of magazines in Italy
