= La Sibilla =

Italian puzzle magazine

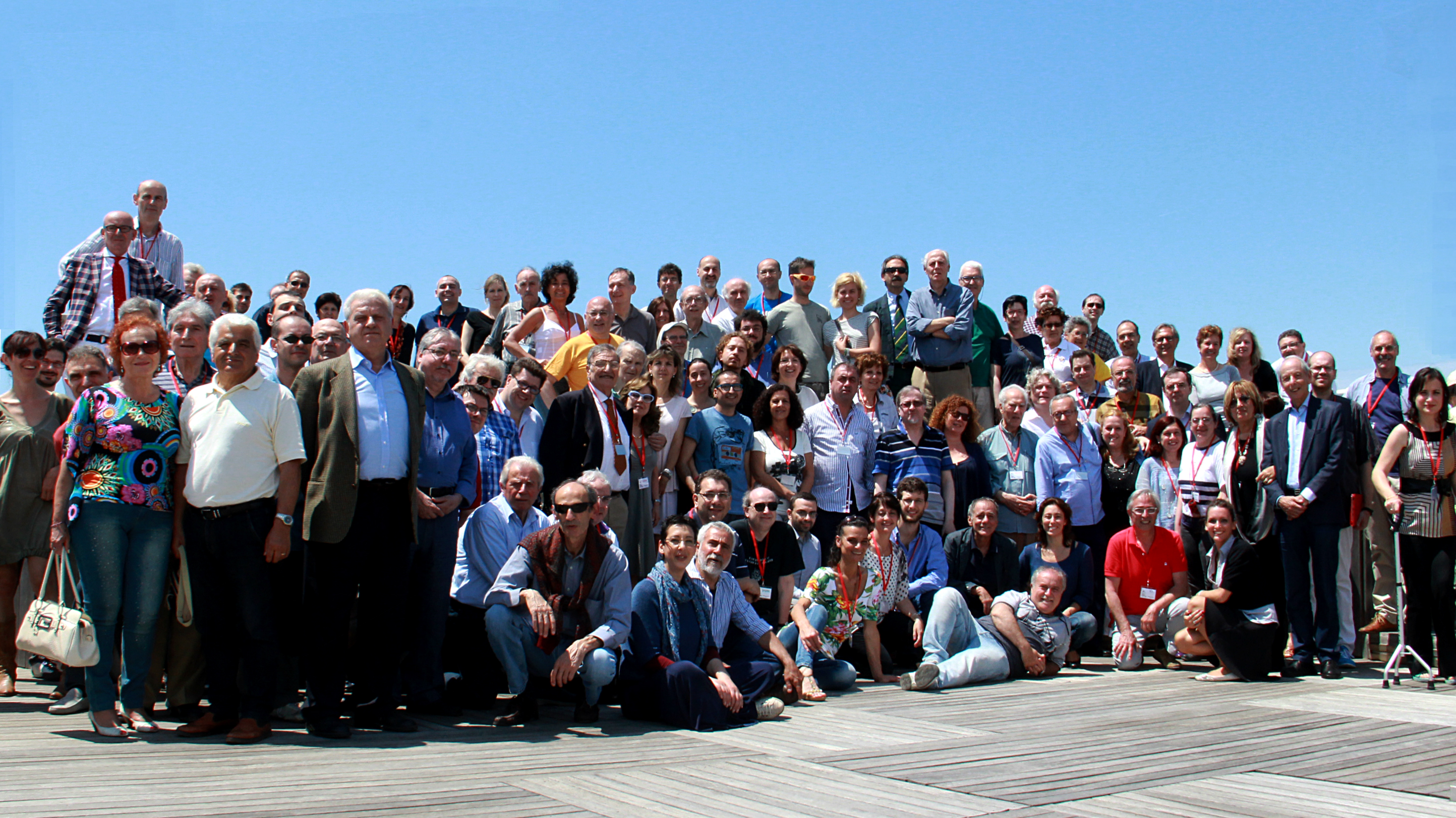
- Italian La Sibilla subscribers at the Festa della Sibilla in Marina di Massa
- Categories: Word puzzle magazine
- Frequency: Bimonthly
- Founder: Guido Iazzetta
- Founded: 1975
- Country: Italy
- Based in: Naples
- Language: Italian
- Website: www.lasibilla.altervista.org

La Sibilla is a bimonthly word puzzle magazine (six issues per year) founded in Naples in 1975 by Guido Iazzetta.

The name is based on the famous Cumaean Sibyl, a legendary woman with prophetic powers, who according to tradition lived in a cave near Cumae. The Sibyl expressed her prophecies in a cryptic way, for which reason she has always been associated with the idea of mystery and enigmas.

Monthly from 1975 to 1978, then bimonthly, the magazine has published more than thirty supplements (Quaderni della Sibilla) and is one of the longest-running puzzle magazines in Italy.

Among other word puzzles, La Sibilla publishes works in poetic form (either long and with a serious subject, or short and witty called epigrammatici) that are puzzles alluding through hidden double meanings to a different subject, which must be found besides the apparent meaning (see riddle). It also publishes cryptic puzzles, rebuses, technical articles about word puzzles and, more generally, wordplay (Italian: Ludolinguistica).

La Sibilla hosts a yearly festival – Festa della Sibilla – variously in Liguria, Tuscany, and Campania.

The editorial staff is Edgardo Bellini, Alessandro Cassani, Rosanna Gastaldi, Maria Maraviglia, and Giuseppe Sangalli. Previous illustrators include Alfredo Baroni, Roberto Mangosi, Sandro Mosca, Giorgio Noliani, Simona Simone, and Enrico Viceconte. Former contributors include Stefano Bartezzaghi, Umberto Eco, Nicola Piovani, Roberto Vecchioni, Francesco Guccini and Paolo Conte.
