= Giornale dei Ragazzi =

Italian children's magazine

The Giornale dei Ragazzi (Journal of the Teens) was a fortnightly magazine for children consisting of short stories, comics and cultural columns.

== History and profile ==
Giornale dei Ragazzi was created in April 1926 on the initiative of Cesare Ferri, an elementary school teacher who at the time was a popular radio host, under the name "Nonno Radio". Featuring a dutiful observance of the moral dictates of Fascism, the magazine consisted mostly of columns on various topics, and introduced the comics (of strict Italian production, in compliance with the directives of the MinCulPop) only from the 8th number in last year of publication.

In November 1943, the magazine announced Vittorio Metz as a new director to replace Ferri, as well as a new format (rotogravure size and color pages) and a weekly cadence, but the redesign never took shape and the magazine closed after 17 years of publication.

== See also ==
- List of magazines in Italy
