= Archeologia Viva =

Bimonthly archeology magazine in Italy

- Categories: Archeology magazine
- Frequency: Bimonthly
- Publisher: Giunti Gruppo Editoriale
- Founder: Piero Pruneti
- Founded: 1982; 44 years ago
- Country: Italy
- Based in: Florence
- Language: Italian
- Website: Archeologia Viva
- ISSN: 0392-9485
- OCLC: 10320334

Archeologia Viva (Italian: Archaeology Alive) is an Italian-language bimonthly magazine concerning archeology. It is headquartered in Florence, Italy.

== History and profile ==
Archeologia Viva was established by Piero Pruneti in 1982. Pruneti also serves as the director of the magazine which is published bimonthly by Giunti Gruppo Editoriale. The magazine organizes meetings on archeology and an annual archaeological film festival.

The frequent articles in Archeologia Viva include topics about prehistorical periods and the Middle Ages with particular attention to the classical civilizations of the Mediterranean. In each issue reports are published on major excavations, archaeological techniques, underwater archeology, museums and exhibitions in Italy and abroad.

== See also ==
- List of magazines in Italy
