= Gioventù Fascista =

Italian magazine

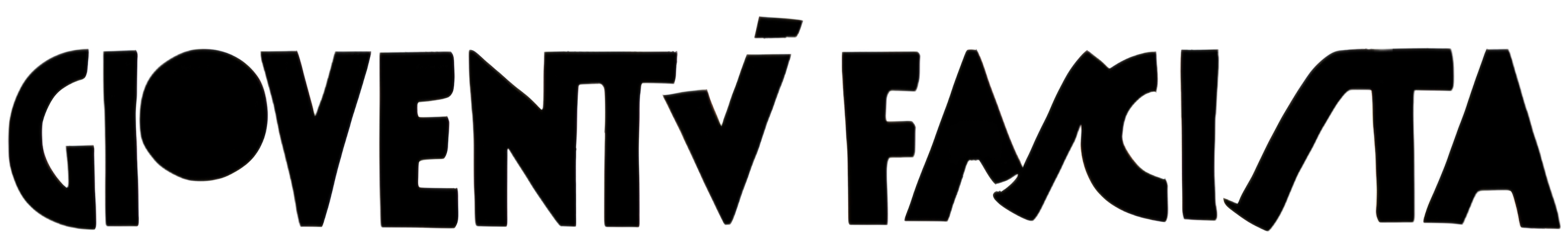
- Categories: Political magazine; Cultural magazine
- Frequency: Monthly
- Founder: Carlo Scorza
- Founded: 23 March 1931
- Final issue: December 1936
- Country: Italy
- Based in: Rome
- Language: Italian

Gioventù Fascista ("Fascist Youth") was a magazine designed for youth in Italy under Benito Mussolini's Fascist state. Its features included stories and cartoons praising the regime and inculcating the tenets of Fascism.

Most of the magazine covers feature the fasces, and sometimes other Roman imagery; the style of its illustrations was heavily influenced by futurism.

The paper was founded on 23 March 1931 (the 12th anniversary of the creation of the Fasci Italiani di Combattimento, the precursor of the National Fascist Party). Its first editor was Carlo Scorza, replaced by Achille Starace later in the first year of the magazine's existence. During its existence, Gioventù Fascista published contributions by notable Fascists, including Filippo Tommaso Marinetti, Italo Balbo, Giovanni Giuriati, and Giuseppe Bottai. It was no longer in print after December 1936.

== See also ==
- List of magazines in Italy
