= Divisare =

Italian online library of contemporary architecture

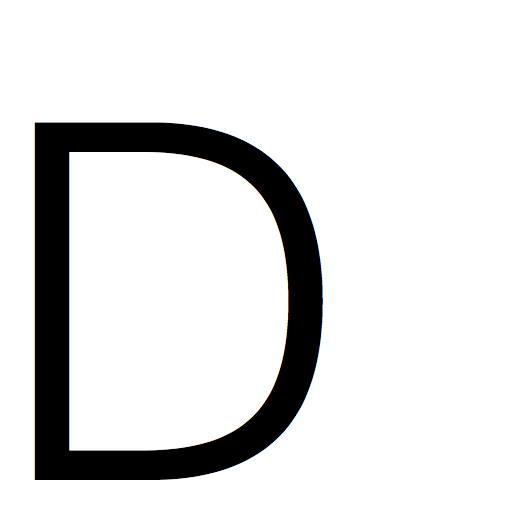
- Categories: Architecture
- Founded: 1998
- Country: Italy
- Based in: Rome
- Language: English

Divisare is the largest library of contemporary architecture online, founded in 1998 in Rome, Italy. Published projects are classified in curated albums, each dedicated to a specific topic or typology.

== History ==
Divisare is one of the first architecture websites in the history of the web. Online since 1998 as Europaconcorsi, it was rebranded in August 2015, launching three new different platforms: Divisare, Europaconcorsi and Architettura Italiana. At first, Europaconcorsi was a service to inform architects about design competitions in Europe (in Italian, "concorsi" means competitions), on recently issued tenders as well as the results of competitions, with rankings of the winners and the participating projects. From the outset Europaconcorsi was conceived as a structure of related but distinct databases: informations on competitions, projects and designers were gathered in autonomous data structures.

With almost 20 years of history behind it, and over 140,000 projects, Divisare is the largest online archive of contemporary architecture. Curated by the team based in Rome, Italy, Divisare is structured as a library of thematic albums (organized per elements, cities, houses, ideas, materiality, plans & details, private interiors, public interiors, topics and types) featuring the most relevant pieces of architecture ever designed. Complementary with the daily showcase on the online platform, registered subscribers received Journal, a weekly review curated by the editorial staff.

Divisare means imagining, designing with the mind, literally "to devise". The term was used by Leon Battista Alberti to define the work of the architect: "Him I call an Architect, who, by sure and wonderful Art and Method, is able, both with Thought and Invention, to devise." (Leon Battista Alberti — De Re Aedificatoria, 1450 - original Italian: "Architettore chiamerò io colui, il quale saprà con certa, e maravigliosa ragione, e regola, sì con la mente, e con lo animo divisare").

During November 2018, the website announced that the Atlas of Architecture would be soon closed. A month later, final closure was set to December 15, 2018. As of December 15, Divisare, Divisare Books and all personal pages became inactive.

As of July 1, 2019, Divisare has relaunched their website and online bookstore.

== Europaconcorsi ==
In August 2015, Europaconcorsi was split into three different platforms: Divisare, Europaconcorsi and Architettura Italiana. Today, Europaconcorsi (europaconcorsi.com) is the world's leading platform in professional information for architects and engineers about design competitions in Europe.

== Architettura Italiana ==
Online since August 2015, Architettura Italiana (architettura-italiana.com) was set off with 16 years of work and experience, almost 80,000 registered designers, and over 100,000 projects in its archives.

== Divisare Books ==
In early 2017, Divisare launched Divisare Books, a high-quality, independent editorial project, a modular publication dedicated to architecture documents, a constantly growing archipelago of monographic issues each tackling a different topic: drawings collections, photographic surveys, visual essays, short writings and projects. The first series of Divisare Books was released in March 2017. It included 45 titles and 3 limited edition box sets (Dario Passi - Drawings, Italian Interiors and Rory Gardiner - Museums). In October 2017, Divisare Books published 76 new titles, 20 reprints and 15 new box sets. In December 2017, Divisare Books extended its production to Divisare Notebooks, limited-edition boxed sets of 12 sketchbooks (Red Series) or 4 sketchbooks (Blue Series). Divisare Books ceased to exist as of December 15, 2018. On July 1, 2019, Divisare Books has relaunched and is now selling a new selection of architecture books in limited numbers.
