= Ciao 2001 =

Italian music magazine

- September 1973 issue, featuring Brian Eno
- Categories: Music magazine
- Frequency: Monthly
- Publisher: Sprea
- Founded: 1969
- Based in: Rome
- Language: Italian

Ciao 2001 is an Italian monthly music magazine originally published between 1969 and 2000. It reprised its publications in 2023.

== History and profile ==
The magazine was founded in 1969 in Rome, as the result of the fusion of the music magazines Big (later Ciao Big) and Ciao Amici. In a few years, it became the most sold music magazine in Italy, mostly attracting a young audience. Initially focused on pop music, it gradually covered all music genres, including beat, rock, jazz, and folk. It also had columns devoted to radio and television, theatre, art, and psychology.

After a massive success, especially in the early 1980s, the magazine suffered a long decline, which led to its first closure in 1994. It first reprised its publications in 1999, rebranding itself in Ci@o for its final five issues in 2000. In 2023, the magazine was relaunched by former collaborators Maurizio Becker and Renato Marengo.

== See also ==
- List of magazines in Italy
