= Platform Architecture and Design =

- Editor: Publicomm srl
- Categories: Architecture, Design
- Frequency: Bi – Monthly
- Publisher: Publicomm srl
- First issue: March 2015
- Company: Publicomm srl
- Country: Italy
- Based in: Milan
- Language: English, Italian
- Website: Platform Architecture and Design

Platform Architecture And Design is a nationally distributed magazine looking at design, architecture and interiors. The magazine was first published in March 2015. It targets architects, designers, interior design professionals and enthusiasts.

It presents the best of Italian design, creativity and style, while closely following international trends and bringing together ideas and new directions.
