= Asso di bastoni =

Weekly satirical magazine in Italy (1948–1957)

- Categories: Satirical magazine; Political magazine
- Frequency: Weekly
- Founder: Repubblica Sociale Italiana
- Founded: 1948
- Final issue: 1957
- Country: Italy
- Based in: Rome
- Language: Italian

Asso di bastoni (Italian: Ace of clubs; Italian pronunciation: [ˌasso di baˈstoːni]) was a weekly satirical and political magazine which was headquartered in Rome, Italy. It was in circulation between 1948 and 1957. The magazine was the organ of the Repubblica Sociale Italiana which was established by the members of the Italian Social Movement, a neo-fascist political party.

== History and profile ==
Asso di bastoni was launched by the Repubblica Sociale Italiana in 1948. The group consisted of the members of the Italian Social Movement. The magazine was published on a weekly basis in Rome. Vanni Teodorani who was the son-in-law of Arnaldo Mussolini was the director of the magazine. One of the contributors was British fascist politician Oswald Mosley who published articles on his European vision. In fact, Mosley's Europe a Nation was among the supporters of the magazine.

During its lifetime Asso di bastoni sold 30,000 weekly copies. It offered a prize for the stories which covered the period between 1940 and 1945. Some of the stories that won this prize were published in Asso di bastoni. The magazine folded in 1957.
