= Klat Magazine =

Italian art magazine

- Editor: Paolo Priolo
- Categories: Contemporary art, Design, Architecture
- Publisher: iLight project s.a.s.
- Founder: Paolo Priolo, Emanuela Carelli
- First issue: 2009
- Final issue: 2012 (print)
- Country: Italy
- Based in: Milan
- Language: Italian, English
- Website: http://www.klatmagazine.com
- ISSN: 2036-6760

Klat Magazine is an independent publishing project launched at the end of 2009, in Milan, on the initiative of Paolo Priolo and Emanuela Carelli, with the aim of investigating the multifaceted space of contemporary art, design and architecture through a close encounter with its protagonists.

The name Klat comes from the word “talk” written back to front, and reflects the publishers’ desire to develop a new vocabulary and new ways of exchanging views on the subjects covered.

== Brief Summary ==
The project started out as a quarterly print periodical made up solely of very long interviews, published in two languages (Italian and English) and distributed in fifteen countries: Italy, Germany, United Kingdom, France, Sweden, Belgium, Portugal, China, Hong Kong, Malta, Singapore, Taiwan, Japan, Australia and the United States.

Between 2009 and 2011 five issues came out, containing a total of forty interviews with leading exponents of contemporary design and creativity, including Stefano Boeri, Andrea Branzi, Alfredo Jaar, Hans Ulrich Obrist, Francesco Vezzoli, Rosa Barba, Maurizio Cattelan, Martino Gamper, Maarten Baas, John Maeda, Oliviero Toscani, Nigel Coates, Peter Eisenman, Martí Guixé, Toyo Ito, Jasper Morrison, Peter Zumthor.

In 2012 the publishers decided to wind up the print version and turn the original idea into an online magazine that proposes a daily mix of viewpoints, conversations, images and opinions, broadening the field of inquiry to embrace architecture, contemporary art, design, photography, fashion and other forms of applied creativity.

Klat Magazine is a publication registered at the Milan Tribunal (no. 197, April 24, 2009). The editor-in-chief is Paolo Priolo.
