= Jumbo (magazine) =

Defunct weekly comics magazine in Italy (1932–1938)

Publication information
- Publisher: Lotario Vecchi
- Schedule: Weekly
- Publication date: 1932 – 1938
- Main character(s): Jumbo (Tiger Tim); Lucio L'avanguardista (Rob the Rover); Tarzan; Ace Drummond

Jumbo was a weekly comic magazine published in Milan, Italy, from 1932 to 1938. The subtitle of the magazine which was an eight-page publication was settimanale illustrato per ragazzi ('illustrated weekly for boys').

== History and profile ==
Jumbo was founded by Lotario Vecchi in 1932. The first issue appeared on 17 December that year. The magazine was based in Milan, and its publisher was Società Anonima Editrice Vecchi. The magazine had a large commercial success, with an average circulation of about 300,000 copies per week.

It mainly consisted of American and British comics, starting from the title character Tiger Tim (renamed as Jumbo), a comic strip series created by Julius Stafford Baker and taken over by Herbert Sydney Foxwell. A key role in the success of the magazine was also played by Rob the Rover, an adventure comic series by Walter Henry Booth which was translated as Lucio L'avanguardista (i.e. "The young avantgarde Lucio") and whose main character was adapted as a fascist airman. It also introduced to the Italian audience several notable American comics including Rex Maxon's Tarzan and Ace Drummond. It closed after the banning of the foreign comics ordered by Fascist MinCulPop in 1938.

== See also ==
- List of magazines in Italy
