= Sogno (magazine) =

Italian fotoromanzo magazine 1947-2011

- Categories: Women's magazine
- Frequency: weekly (1947-1976), fortnightly (1977-1982), monthly (1983-2011)
- Founder: Giorgio De Fonseca
- Founded: 1947
- First issue: 8 May 1947
- Final issue Number: October 2011; 337
- Company: Novissima (1947-1975), Lancio (1975-2011)
- Country: Italy
- Based in: Rome
- Language: Italian

Sogno was an Italian fotoromanzo magazine published between 1947 and 2011. Originally titled Il mio sogno, the first edition reached newsstands 8 May 1947. Giorgio De Fonseca, owner of publishing company Novissima, managed to beat rival publication bolero film to market by just 15 days, thus becoming the first full fotoromanzo magazine. The title was acquired by publishing company Lancio in 1975, which published Sogno until the company closed in 2011.

The magazine employed talents that would later become successful in the film industry, including Dario Argento who served as magazine editor, and actors Gina Lollobrigida (credited as Giana Loris) and Sophia Loren (credited as Sofia Lazzaro).

== See also ==
- List of magazines in Italy
