= Mondadori =

Italian publishing company

Arnoldo Mondadori Editore S.p.A.

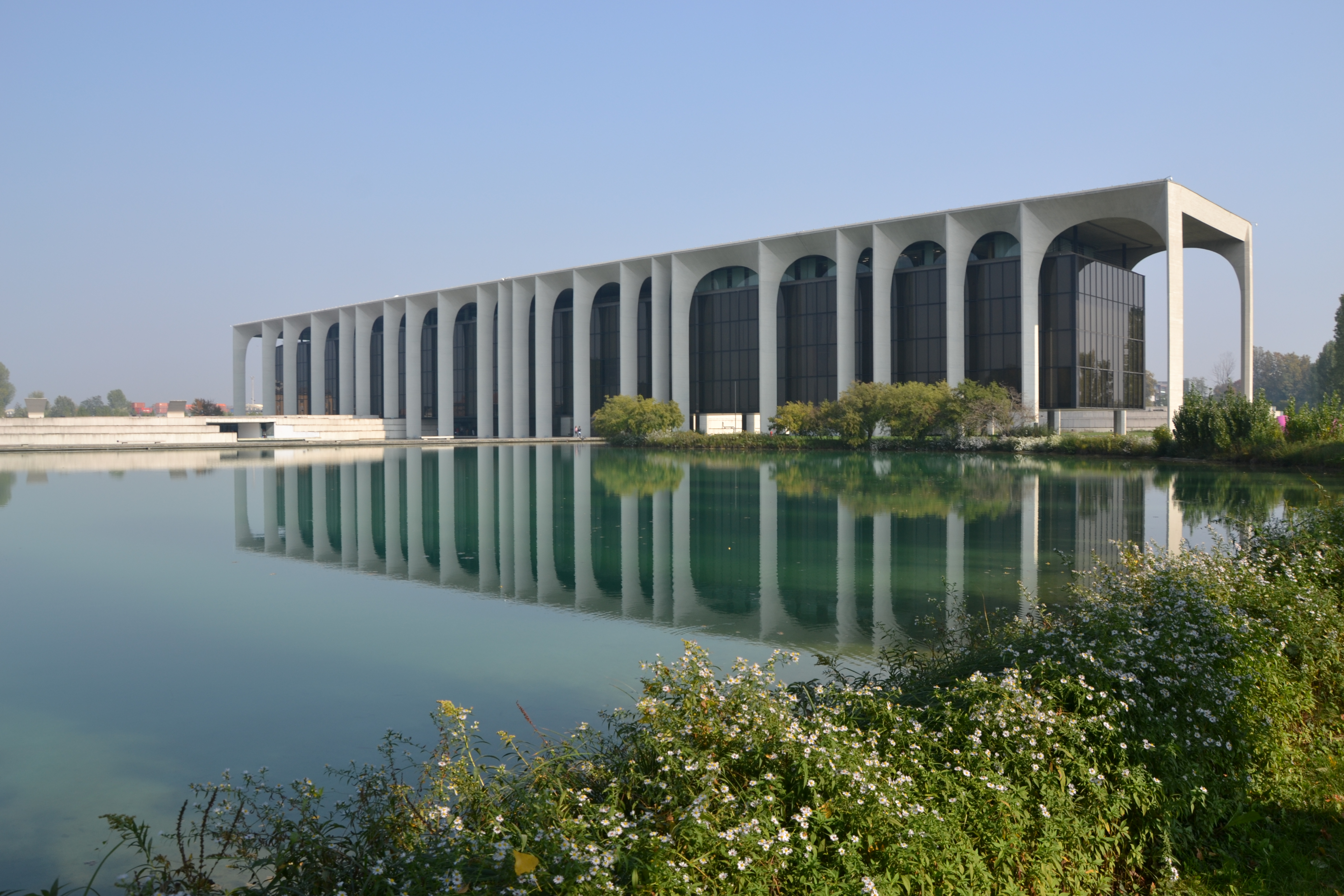
- Headquarters in Milan
- Trade name: Gruppo Mondadori
- Type: Public
- Traded as: BIT: MN; FTSE Italia Mid Cap
- Industry: Media
- Founded: 1907; 119 years ago, Ostiglia, Mantua, Italy
- Founder: Arnoldo Mondadori
- Headquarters: Segrate, Milan, Italy
- Key people: Marina Berlusconi (Chairman); Ernesto Mauri (CEO)
- Products: Publishing of books and magazines, retail
- Services: Bookshops
- Revenue: €884.6 million (2020)
- Operating income: €83.54 million (2020)
- Net income: €28.2 million (2020)
- Total assets: €934.43 million (2020)
- Total equity: €170.4 million (2020)
- Owner: Fininvest (53.30%); private equity fund of Silchester International Investors (12.56%)
- Number of employees: 1,845 (2020)
- Subsidiaries: Mondadori Libri; Mondadori Media; AdKaora; Mondadori International Business; Mondadori Scienza; Attica Publications; Direct Channel; Press-di; Mondadori Retail; Società Europea di Edizioni; Monradio
- Website: mondadorigroup.com

Arnoldo Mondadori Editore S.p.A. (Italian: [arˈnɔldo mondaˈdoːri ediˈtoːre]) is a publishing company in Italy.

== History ==
The company was founded in 1907 in Ostiglia by 18-year-old Arnoldo Mondadori who began his publishing career with the publication of the magazine Luce! In 1912, he founded La Sociale and published the first book AiaMadama together with his close friend Tommaso Monicelli and the following year, La Lampada, a series of children's books.

The publishing house kept working intensely even during the First World War, mainly on the publication of magazines for the troops on the front such as La Tradotta, which included contributions from famous illustrators and writers such as Soffici, De Chirico and Carrà.

In 1919 the publishing house headquarters were transferred to Milan.

Historical ownership and the role of Senatore Borletti (1921–1940),

In 1921, Arnoldo Mondadori entered into a financial partnership with Italian industrialist Senatore Borletti, a prominent figure in the textile industry and the development of the La Rinascente department store group. On 31 May 1921, the publishing business was reorganized as A. Mondadori Società Anonima, with Borletti becoming chairman and principal financial backer, while Arnoldo Mondadori served as managing director. Borletti’s investment and financial connections helped provide the capital and access to credit needed for the company’s expansion.

Following Borletti’s death in 1939, his son Aldo succeeded him as chairman, while the family’s controlling interest remained in place. In 1940, Arnoldo Mondadori secured a loan of three million lire from the Istituto Mobiliare Italiano (IMI), enabling him to acquire majority control of the publishing house and become its chairman. Aldo Borletti remained on the board as vice-chairman.

After the First World War, Mondadori launched several successful book series including Gialli Mondadori in 1929, the first example of an Italian book series dedicated to detective and crime novels, by international writers, a new genre for Italy. The series is distinguished by the yellow (giallo in Italian) colour of the covers. The response from the public was positive, with five thousand copies sold in a month and eight thousand after a hundred days. In addition to those who are considered the masters of the genre, such as Raymond Chandler, Dashiell Hammett, Georges Simenon, Agatha Christie and Erle Stanley Gardner, in 1931 even some Italian writers began to take an interest in the genre and write yellow novels. As a result of the success and longevity of the series, still on newsstands, "giallo" has become the Italian name of the literary genre.

Despite a period of cultural autarky, in 1933, Mondadori started publishing works of international writers with the Medusa book series. In 1935, through an agreement with Walt Disney, the publishing house began the publication of a children's magazine based on Disney comics characters, which ran until 1988, when the agreement between Mondadori and the Walt Disney Company ended (the comics rights were transferred to The Walt Disney Company Italy).

In 1950, Mondadori returned to the information magazines, abandoned ten years earlier with the suspension, due to the war, of the monthly Tempo. The weekly Epoca was started, which imported the American model of photojournalism into Italy. A few years later, in 1962, Mondadori published Panorama. The magazine was founded as a monthly information magazine, and it was only in 1967 that it became a weekly, inspired by the editorial formula of Time and Newsweek, and was transformed into a successful newsmagazine.

In 1952, Mondadori launched I romanzi di Urania (Urania's novels), a twice-monthly Italian science fiction magazine that contributed to the wider diffusion of this genre in Italy.

In 1960 Mondadori launched Il Club degli Editori, the first Italian mail-order book club and in 1965 became the first Italian publishing house to launch low-cost paperbacks for sale through newsstands (Oscar Mondadori), an experiment that would be a huge success and that was imitated by many publishers. The aim of the series was to reach an audience not used to buying in bookshops. The first novel published was A Farewell to Arms by Ernest Hemingway, who immediately experienced great results in terms of copies sold.

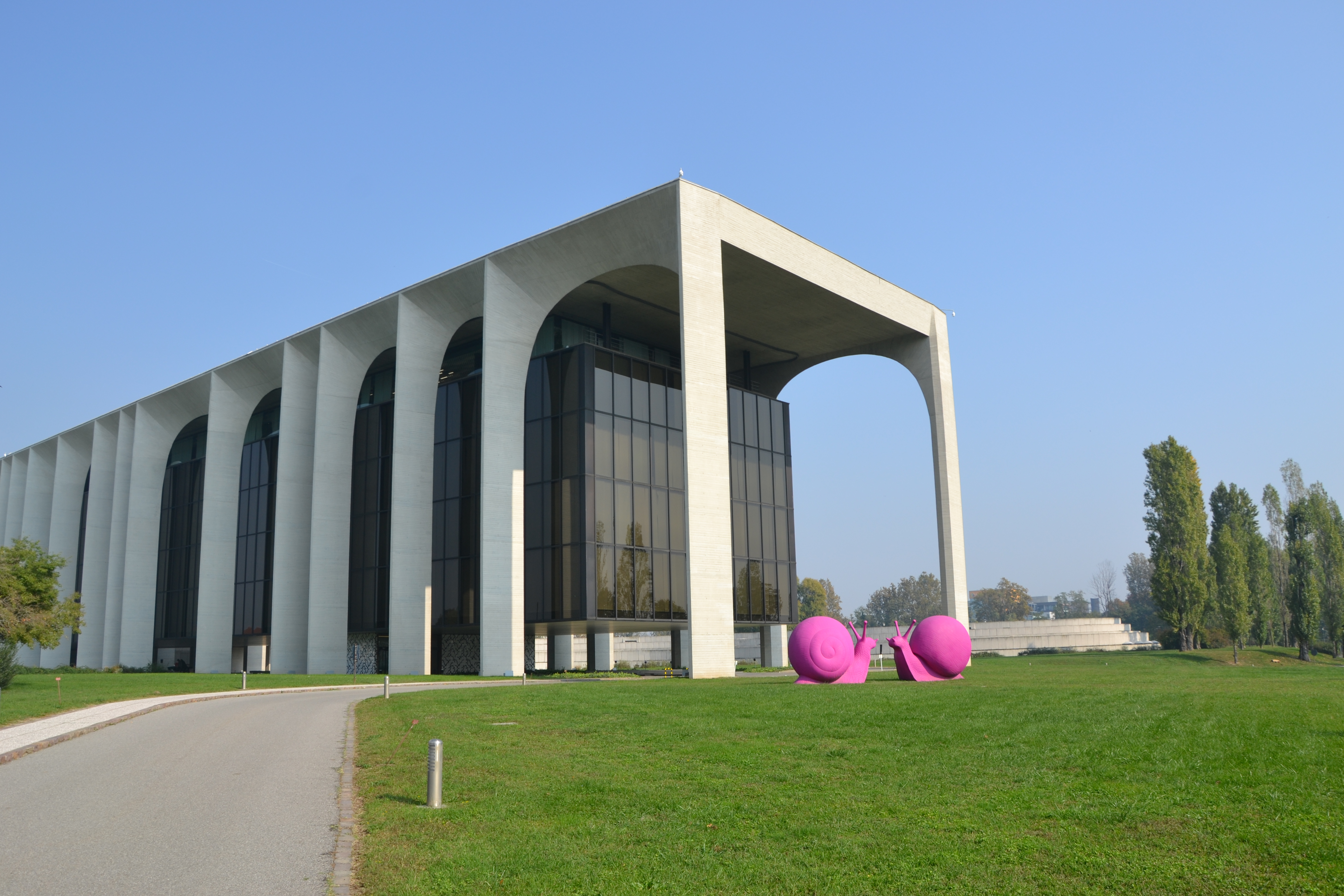
The Mondadori headquarters in Segrate, designed by the architect Oscar Niemeyer

Between 1950 and 1965, the number of employees at Mondadori rose from 335 to 3,000, resulting in the company's decision to construct a new building on the outskirts of Milan, specifically within the municipality of Segrate.

In 1968, Giorgio Mondadori, Arnoldo's son and chairman of the publishing house, decided to assign the project for the new headquarters to Brazilian architect Oscar Niemeyer, after having admired his work on the Foreign Ministry (Palácio Itamaraty) in Brasilia three years earlier. Construction began in 1971, and the new headquarters was inaugurated in January 1975.

Through a joint venture with Gruppo Editoriale L'Espresso in 1976, Mondadori published La Repubblica, its first daily newspaper; Gruppo Editoriale L'Espresso was finally separated from Mondadori in 1991.

In 1981 Mondadori entered the television business with the launch of the Rete Quattro TV station, which was sold to Fininvest a few years later. In the same year, through a joint venture with Canada's Harlequin Enterprises, the romantic fiction book series Harmony began to be published in Italy.

The company has been controlled by Fininvest, Silvio Berlusconi's family holding company since 1991. Marina Berlusconi is the chairman.

In 1989, Mondadori expanded into Mexico by acquiring Editorial Grijalbo. Beginning in 2001, Mondadori operated a joint venture with Random House in Spanish-speaking countries. Random House bought out Mondadori's stake in 2012.

In 2006, Mondadori took a big step forward in its international expansion with the acquisition of Emap France, one of France's leading magazine publishers, today Mondadori France.

Mondadori was one of the first Italian publishers to enter the e-book market, and in 2000, an agreement was signed with Microsoft Corporation for the creation of the first Italian site for the sale of electronic books. In 2010, Mondadori accelerated its presence: in June, the Group's online bookstore launched a store dedicated to digital books, with a vast catalogue of titles in Italian and English. In December, Mondadori reached an agreement for the international distribution of books produced by the Group's publishing houses on Google Books and Google eBooks. Thanks to an accord with Vodafone Italia, in 2011 Mondadori launched the first online newsstand for tablets. Through this new platform, it is possible to access the digital edition of the Group's major weeklies and monthlies. The digital development continued in July 2011 with an agreement between Mondadori and Amazon that makes the Group's e-books available through the Kindle store. In September 2011, Mondadori's digital titles were also made available on the iBookstore for the Apple iPad, iPhone and iPod touch.

The following year, Mondadori Group and Kobo Inc., a leading company globally in digital reading, signed an agreement for the distribution in Italy of Kobo's eReading platform and related devices. In 2014 Mondadori bought the trademark and assets of aNobii, the global social reading platform with more than a million users around the world, of which around 300,000 in Italy, with the aim of supporting the process of growth in digital for books.

In 2012, Mondadori published Fifty Shades of Grey, the first volume of the erotic trilogy by debut London author E L James, rapidly followed by the two other titles, Fifty Shades Darker and Fifty Shades Freed. The trilogy saw in Italy the same kind of unprecedented success it gained in the English-language world: with more than 3.3 million copies sold in Italy and 130,000 downloads of the electronic version, the three volumes reached first, third and fourth position of the bestseller list for 2012.

In 2015–16, the acquisitions of RCS Libri (was renamed to Rizzoli Libri) from RCS MediaGroup as well as Banzai Media mark the culmination of the strategy launched in 2013 of focusing on the traditional core businesses: books and magazines.

In 2016, the Italian Competition Authority ruled that Mondadori would have to divest the publishers Bompiani and Marsilio Editori, following its acquisition of RCS Libri. Marsilio Editori was sold by Rizzoli Libri to De Michelis family's GEM S.r.l. while Bompiani was sold to Giunti Editore for €16.5 million.

As part of the strategy of focusing on its core businesses, in 2018 the Group sold Panorama and in 2019 its subsidiary Mondadori France to Reworld Media.

== Mondadori war ==
In 1988, Silvio Berlusconi bought Leonardo Mondadori's (nephew of Arnoldo Mondadori) shares of the company. As such the publishing house was owned by three entities: Berlusconi's Fininvest, Carlo De Benedetti's CIR and the Formenton family (Arnoldo Mondadori's heir). Carlo De Benedetti, seeking a majority, then stipulated a pre-agreement with the Formentons to obtain their shares by 30 January 1991. In November 1989, the Formenton family switched side and sold their share to Berlusconi, who became the new Mondadori chairman on 25 January 1990. Following De Benedetti's protests, citing his previous agreement with the Formentons, the three sides took the unanimous decision to solve the conflict through arbitration.

On 20 June 1990, an initial verdict declared the agreement between De Benedetti and Formenton valid, with the Formenton's shares going to De Benedetti. Berlusconi and the Formentons appealed at the Appeal Court of Rome, which assigned the case to Civil Section I. This section was chaired by Arnaldo Valente, and the Judge-Rapporteur was Vittorio Metta. On 24 January 1991 a new ruling nullified the initial verdict and gave the Mondadori shares back to Berlusconi.

In 1995, an investigation into the authenticity of the ruling concluded that Berlusconi won thanks to the corruption of Judge Vittorio Metta. Metta was sentenced to 11 years in prison in 2003, but won an appeal in 2005. The Supreme Court of Cassation nullified that appeal in 2006, and Metta was sentenced to 1 year and 9 months in 2007. Berlusconi was not sentenced as the trial had expired its limitation.

== Business areas ==
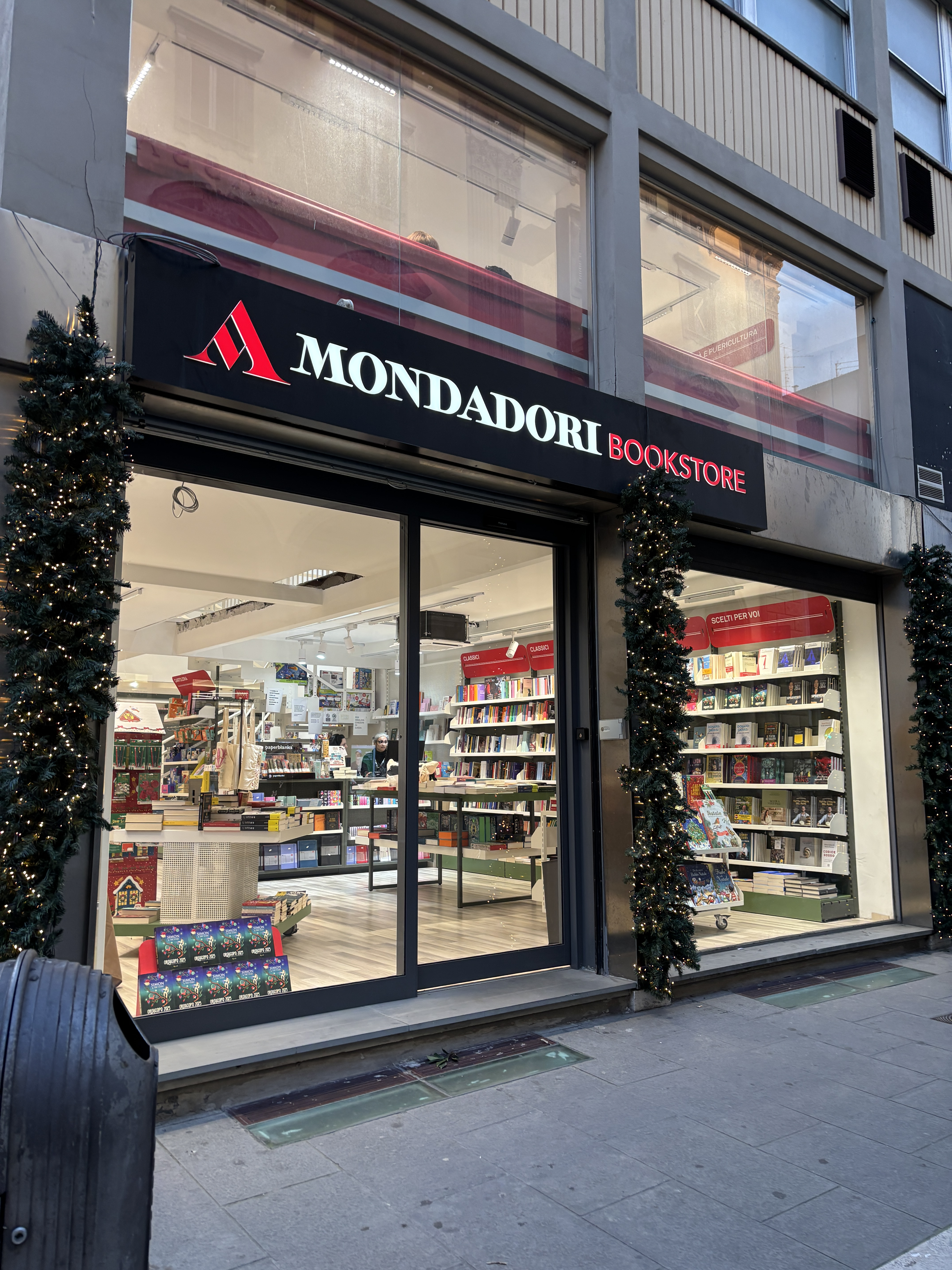
A Mondadori Bookstore in Arezzo

- Books
- Magazines (Italy and worldwide licensing)
- Retail: the company owns a chain of bookshops and the internet-based bookshop mondadoristore.it.

== Imprints ==
The group today includes several distinct publishing houses, a number of which have more than one imprint:

=== Mondadori ===
Founded in 1907 by Arnoldo Mondadori in Ostiglia, but based in Milan since 1919, Edizioni Mondadori became one of the best-known Italian book publishers, with early collaborations with Disney and the Il Giallo Mondadori series of mystery/crime novels.

=== Giulio Einaudi Editore ===
Founded in 1933 by Giulio Einaudi in Turin, it became one of the most significant Italian publishing houses of the twentieth century. Its authors included Cesare Pavese, Elio Vittorini, Italo Calvino, Leone Ginzburg and Bruno Zevi, and it was the publisher of Antonio Gramsci's Prison Notebooks. It was acquired by Mondadori in 1994.

=== Edizioni EL ===
Based in Trieste and publishing children's books under the imprints EL, Einaudi Ragazzi and Emme Edizione. Giulio Einaudi editore has a 50% stake in the company.

=== Sperling & Kupfer ===
Acquired by Mondadori in the 1980s, this publishing house, founded in 1899, is one of the oldest publishing houses in Milan. Its traditional international focus and concentration on current affairs has been supplemented in recent years by publications in fiction, non-fiction, economics, manuals and popular science. Its imprints include Frassinelli.

=== Edizioni Piemme ===
Acquired by Mondadori in 2003, Edizioni Piemme is particularly active in the area of religion and books for children and young adults.

=== Mondadori Electa ===
A group based in Milan with three imprints: Electa, active in the art and history of art sector since 1945; Mondadori, which publishes illustrated books in areas such as nature, hobbies and history as well as tourist guides; and Mondadori Arte, intended to present art, architecture, design and archaeology to non-specialist audiences.

=== Mondadori Education ===
Formerly Edumond Le Monnier, was acquired in 2008 and based in Milan, Bologna and Florence.

=== Rizzoli Libri ===
Founded in 1927, Rizzoli is a large general publishing house which publishes works of fiction and non-fiction, books for young adults, graphic novels, manuals and illustrated books.

=== Rizzoli Education ===
Rizzoli Education is a leader in Italian school publishing, where it is present in every order of instruction through publishing products (paper and digital), services and technologies for students, families and teachers.

== Magazines ==
=== Italy ===
- Automobile Club until 2011
- Auto oggi until 2011
- Bolero Film
- Panoramauto.it
- CasaFacile
- Casabella
- Casaviva until 2013
- Chi
- Ciak until 2014
- Confidenze until 2019
- Cosmopolitan until 2011
- Creare until 2007
- Cucina Moderna until 2019
- Cucina No Problem until 2018
- Donna Moderna
- Doppiovù until 1978
- Economy until 2012
- Epoca
- Evo until 2011
- Flair until 2016
- Focus
- Focus Brain Trainer until 2012
- Focus Junior
- Focus Pico
- Focus Storia
- Geo until 2015
- Giallo Zafferano
- Grazia until 2022
- Grazia Casa until 2015
- Guida Cucina until 2018
- Guida TV
- Icon
- Icon Design
- Il mio Papa
- Interni
- Jack until 2012
- Men's Health until 2013
- Nuovi Argomenti
- Panorama until 2018
- Panorama Travel until 2013
- PC Professionale until 2014
- Prometeo
- Sale & Pepe until 2019
- Spy
- Starbene until 2019
- Telepiù
- Tempo
- Topolino until 1988
- TuStyle until 2019
- TV Sorrisi e Canzoni
- VilleGiardini until 2013

=== Greece ===
Mondadori owns 41.66% of Greece's Attica Publications S.A., Athens DeeJay (Greece), and Rock FM (Greece).

== Digital properties ==
- AndroidWorld.it
- SmartWorld.it
- MobileWorld.it
- AlterVista.org
- PianetaDonna.it
- GialloZafferano.it
- Studenti.it
- Mypersonaltrainer.it
- SoldiOnline.it

== Market shares and competitors 2019 ==
- Italian market share (trade books): 26.2% (source: GFK, December 2019) – competitors: GeMS Group, Giunti Group, Feltrinelli Editore, Newton Compton, De Agostini Group.
- Italian market share (Educational): 21.7% (source: ESAIE, 2019) – competitors: Zanichelli, Pearson, De Agostini Group.
- Italian market share (circulation): 28.9% (in terms of value; source: Press-di, December 2019) – competitors: Cairo Editore, RCS MediaGroup, Casa Editrice Universo, Hearst Magazine, Condé Nast.

== Financial performance ==
Table with a comparison of Mondadori's financial performance over the last 10 years.

The figures for 2018 are presented in accordance with IFRS 5, not including the figures for the asset sold (Mondadori France).

Year	Revenues (€/M)	Gross Operating Profit – EBITDA (€/M)	Operating Profit – EBIT (€/M)	Net Profit (€/M)
2019	884.9	87.0	61.1	33.1
2018	891.1	77.5	51.2	20.3
2017	1,268.3	191.1	61.5	30.4
2016	1,262.9	94.0	60.0	22.5
2015	1,123.2	81.6	54.5	6.4
2014	1,169.5	71.5	48.2	0.6
2013	1,275.8	−12.8	−183.1	−185.4
2012	1,416.1	68.1	−149.9	−166.1
2011	1,507.2	130.4	103.8	49.6
2010	1,558.3	140.2	114.2	42.1
2009	1,540.1	106.2	71.8	34.3

== See also ==
- List of Italian companies
