= 1977 in comics =

Notable events of 1977 in comics.

== Events ==
=== Year overall ===
- Wendy and Richard Pini establish WaRP Graphics.
- Jan and Dean Mullaney establish Eclipse Comics.
- The United Kingdom's Eagle Awards are established.
- Ciao magazine is launched.

=== January ===
- January 3: Stan Lee and John Romita Sr.'s The Amazing Spider-Man newspaper comic strip makes its debut. The storyline of the first strip is that Doctor Doom is coming to address the United Nations.
- January 6: in Italy, the historic magazine Gli albi dell'Intrepido (Edizioni Universo) recìduces the space for comic and changes its headline in Albo TV. .
- January 9: In the Goofy story The Weregoof's Curse!, by Romano Scarpa, Plottigat (Portis) makes his debut.
- Our Army at War #300: "300th Hill," by Robert Kanigher and Joe Kubert. (DC Comics)
- With issue #6 (January//February issue), DC cancels Four Star Spectacular.
- Toward the Terra by Keiko Takemiya debuts in Asahi Sonorama's Gekkan Manga Shōnen magazine.
- In the first issue of the French magazine for children J’aime lire, Tom-Tom and Nana, by Jacqueline Cohen and Bernadette Després, make their debut.
- The mad scientist by Tardi, second album of The Extraordinary Adventures of Adèle Blanc-Sec (Casterman).
- Seul... and Le secret by Derib (Buddy Longway series; Le Lombard)
- Le spectre de Carthage by Jacques Martin (Alix series ; Casterman).
- The Italian magazine Alter Linus changes its headline in Alter alter.

=== February ===
- February 10: HUMO publishes Zappa in Zoeloeland, a comic strip by Kamagurka, with text written by rock musician Frank Zappa.
- February 11: The new Agent 327 adventure Dossier Zondagskind by Martin Lodewijk starts serialisation in the magazine Eppo. In this story, Swiss spy Olga Lawina makes her debut.
- February 12: in Italy, first issue of the magazine Bliz (Edizioni Universo)
- February 15: Merho's De Kiekeboes makes its debut in Het Laatste Nieuws, along with the main characters Marcel, Charlotte, Fanny and Konstantinopel Kiekeboe and villain Balthazar.
- February 20: In Il giornalino, the story Dolci nebbie di Fiandra (Sweet Flemish fogs) by Attilio Micheluzzi starts serialisation, marking the debut of Petra Chérie.
- February 26: The first issue of the British comics magazine 2000 AD is published. It also introduces Pat Mills' Tharg the Mighty.
- February 27: In Topolino, the story Mummy Fearest by Romano Scarpa starts serialisation.
- With issue #258, DC cancels Tarzan, a title it acquired from Gold Key Comics in 1972 (and continued the Gold Key numbering).
- With issue #250, DC suspends publishing Blackhawk, which ran from 1944 to 1968, and was revived in 1976.
- Star Spangled War Stories, with issue #204 (February/March), canceled by DC.
- With issue #33, Marvel cancels the black-and-white magazine Deadly Hands of Kung Fu.
- Planet of the Apes, with issue #29, is cancelled by Marvel.
- Ka-Zar vol. 2, with issue #20, is cancelled by Marvel.
- The Occult Files of Dr. Spektor, with issue #24, canceled by Gold Key.

=== Spring ===
- Doc Savage: Man of Bronze, with issue #8, is cancelled by Curtis Magazines (Marvel Comics).

=== March ===
- March 3: first issue of Skorpio’s Italian edition, by Eura publishing house.
- March 5: Judge Dredd debuts in the second issue of 2000 AD with the story "Judge Whitey", written by Peter Harris and drawn by Mike McMahon.
- March 13: The final episode of James Childress' Conchy is published.
- March 15: The sorceress betrayed, the first episode of Jean Van Hamme and Grzegorz Rosinski's Thorgal is published in Tintin.
- March 17: The Belgian comics magazine Spirou publishes a supplement with more mature content: Le Trombone Illustré. It will run for seven months, until 20 October 1977, before the conventional editors feel it doesn't really fit within their family friendly public image. In its first issue André Franquin's Idées Noires (Franquin's Last Laugh) and Frédéric Jannin and Thierry Culliford's Germain et nous... make their debut.
- March 19: The final episode of Phil Collins' Leonardo is published.
- House of Mystery #251 and The Superman Family #182 became the first DC Comics series in the 80-page Dollar Comics format, consisting of 64 pages of new stories.
- With issue #302, DC changes the title of Our Army at War to Sgt. Rock.
- G.I. Combat #200: "The Tank That Died Twice," by Robert Kanigher and Sam Glanzman.
- Kobra, with issue #7, is cancelled by DC.
- Werewolf by Night, with issue #43, is cancelled by Marvel.
- Valentina assassina (Valentina the murderer) by Guido Crepax. The book includes six Valentina's stories: four reprints and two unpublished ones (Valnetina assassina and Subconscious Valentina).
- National Periodical Publications changes its name to DC Comics, Inc.

=== April ===
- April 10': in Il giornalino, Il giardino nel cortile by Toni Pagot, the angelic outcast Micromino makes his debut.
- April 12: Marvel publish the first issue of Roy Thomas and Howard Chaykin's adaptation of Star Wars.
- April 18: The first episode of Mort Walker and Jerry Dumas' Sam and Silo is published.
- April 30: The Judge Dredd storyline "The Robot Wars" begins in 2000 AD (running through June 18).
- The first issue of Heavy Metal is published, the English-language version of Métal Hurlant.
- G.I. Combat #201 and World's Finest Comics #244 change to the Dollar Comics format. Backup features in World's Finest Comics include Green Arrow, Black Canary, Wonder Woman, and Vigilante.
- Two-Gun Kid, with issue #136, is cancelled by Marvel.
- Marvel Spotlight, with issue #33, is cancelled by Marvel.
- The first issue of the underground comix magazine Rip Off Comix is published.
- Le prince blanc (The white prince) by Jean Graton, 30th album of the Michel Vaillant series.
- In Alter alter, the first chapter of Le straordinarie avventure di Penthotal (Penthotal's extraordinary adventure) by the underground cartoonist Andrea Pazienza is published. A surreal diary of a young cartoonist departed between his artistic vocation and the political consciousness, a transparent alter ego of the author. The series will run until 1981.
- The same issue contains Rembrandt e le streghe (Rembrandt and the witches), by Guido Crepax, 25th episode of the Valentina series.
- First album of The company of the gallows, by Magnus (Edifumetto).

=== May ===
- May: The first issue of the Dutch adult comics magazine Gummi/De Balloen is published. It will last until December 1979.
- May 7: The final episode of Vic Neill's Wee Ben Nevis is published in The Beano.
- May 21: The spin-off series Gnasher's Tale, starring Gnasher, debuts in The Beano, drawn by David Sutherland. It will run up until 1986.
- May 28–30: The final Detroit Triple Fan Fair is organized in Detroit, Michigan, once the oldest regular comic book convention in the world.
- The final episode of Sandro Angiolini's Vartan is published.
- With issue #205, DC changes the title of Star Spangled War Stories to The Unknown Soldier.

=== June ===
- June 3:
  - The death of Australian comics author Syd Nicholls also means the end of the comic strip Fatty Finn, which has run since 1923.
  - In L’europeo the first chapter of Favola di Venezia (Venetian fable), by Hugo Pratt is prepublished.
- June 12: Hergé and Andy Warhol meet after Warhol made three silkscreen portraits of Hergé.
- DC Comics raises the price of its standard comic book from 30 to 35 cents.
- Challengers of the Unknown is revived by DC Comics with issue #81 (June/July cover date; continued from 1958 series); storyline picks up from Super-Team Family issues #8–10.
- Secrets of Haunted House revived with issue #6 (June/July issue) after a 17-month hiatus (DC Comics).
- With issue #5, DC cancels Ragman.
- Lungo fucile by Giancarlo Berardi and Ivo Milazzo, first album of the Ken Parker series (CEPIM).
- The first issue of Cannibale (Cannibal) is published, a satirical and Dadaist magazine, edited by Stefano Tamburini.
- First issue of the erotic-horror series Cimiteria (Edifumetto)

=== July ===
- July 9:
  - The final issue of the British comics magazine Sparky is published, as it merges with The Topper.
  - Dutch comic artist Peter Pontiac publishes his acclaimed autobiographical comic The Amsterdam Connection in issue # of the Dutch magazine Gummi. The story deals with his personal drug use.
- July 15 : in Paris Match, Le fil qui chante (The singing wire) by Morris and Renè Goscinny; last Lucky Luke's adventure written by Goscinny.
- With issue #231, Marvel UK changes the title of the weekly magazine Super Spider-Man and the Titans to Super Spider-Man & Captain Britain, now featuring new Captain Britain stories (as well as The Amazing Spider-Man reprints).
- Iron Man #100: "Ten Rings To Rule the World!" by Bill Mantlo, George Tuska, and Mike Esposito.
- With issue #12, DC revives The New Gods (now called Return of the New Gods), continuing the numbering from the 1971 series.
- With issue #126, DC cancels Young Love (1960 series), picked up from Prize Comics in 1963.
- With issue #7, Marvel publishes the final issue of Logan's Run.

=== August ===
- August 23: The Flemish comics magazine Patskrant, a weekly children's supplement of the newspapers Het Nieuwsblad, De Standaard, Het Handelsblad, De Gentenaar and De Landwacht, changes its name to the Stipkrant. It will run until September 2000.
- With issue #94 (August /September cover date), DC revives Showcase, continuing the numbering from the 1956 series, which ceased publishing in 1970.
- With issue #57, DC revives Aquaman, continuing the numbering from the 1962 series, which ceased publishing in 1971.
- With issue #230, DC cancels Superboy (at this point titled Superboy and the Legion of Super-Heroes).
- With issue #29, DC cancels DC Special (1968 series).
- With issue #12 (August /September cover date), DC cancels Hercules Unbound.
- With issue #12, Marvel cancels The Inhumans.
- With issue #12, Marvel cancels the anthology title Marvel Presents.

=== September ===
- September 13: The first episode of Jeff MacNelly's Shoe is published.
- September 15: in Spirou, first episode of L’Ankou by Jean-Claude Fournier.
- September 24: The first issue of the short-lived British comics magazine Plug is published. It will run until 1979.
- The first episode of David A. Trampier's Wormy is published. It will run until 1988.
- With issue #19, DC revives Mister Miracle (1971 series), which had gone on hiatus in 1974.
- With issue #10, Marvel publishes the final issue of 2001: A Space Odyssey.
- In this month's issue of Pif Gadget, André Chéret kills off his character Rahan. The issue sells 1.5 million copies, but two issues later Rahan is already back from the dead.

=== October ===
- October 6: in Il corriere dei piccoli, Fantòm, by Tiziano Scalvi and Giovanni Pegoraro, makes his debut; he’s a masked avenger, inspired to Fantomas, but on the side of justice.
- October 7: The first edition of the Flemish comics prize Bronzen Adhemar is held in Turnhout. The winner is Hector Leemans, creator of the newspaper comic Bakelandt.
- October 22: The first issue of the British comics magazine Cheeky Weekly is published, in which Reg Parlett's Mustapha Million makes its debut.
- October 24: Bill Hoest's Agatha Crumm makes its debut and will run until 1996.
- With issue #10, Marvel cancels Omega the Unknown.
- With issue #8, DC cancels Starfire.

=== November ===
- November 3: The first episode of Kamagurka's Bert is published in Humo.
- November 13: The final episode of Al Capp's Li'l Abner is published, drawing the series to a close after being in syndication since 1934.
- November 22: After a long interval, Bob De Moor's Cori, de Scheepsjongen (Cori, Le Moussaillon) makes its comeback in Tintin.
- Following rival DC's lead, Marvel Comics raises the price of its standard comic book from 30 to 35 cents.
- With issue #18, DC cancels Richard Dragon, Kung Fu Fighter.

=== December ===
- December 31: The final issue of the Flemish children's magazine Ohee is published, supplement of the newspaper Het Volk.
- Dave Sim's Cerebus the Aardvark makes its debut and is published independently under the name Aardvark-Vanaheim.
- John Byrne and Terry Austin begin their acclaimed run as X-Men penciller/inker team with issue #108 of the title.
- With issue #8 (December 1977/January 1978 cover date), DC cancels Isis.
- In the story The Blackbeard's thaler, by Guido Martina and Massimo De Vita, Jeeves makes his debut.

=== Specific date unknown ===
- The first episode of Matt Groening's Life in Hell is published.
- Gary Panter's comic series Jimbo is launched in the punk magazine Slash.
- The Dutch comics magazine Tante Leny Presenteert receives the Stripschapprijs.
- Alfredo Chiappori starts his historical-educational comic series Storie d'Italia.
- Animation director Chuck Jones launches a newspaper comic Crawford. The series will last only six months, halfway 1978.

== Deaths ==
=== January ===
- January 1:
  - Dean Miller, American comics artist (Mighty O'Malley, continued Vic Flint), dies at age 52.
  - Alexander Saroukhan, Armenian-Egyptian cartoonist and caricaturist, dies at age 78.
- January: Bob Brown, American comics artist (co-creator of Space Ranger, long-time penciller of Challengers of the Unknown), dies at age 62.
- January 22: James Childress, American comics artist and cartoonist (Conchy), commits suicide at age 35.
- January 24: John Rosenberger, American comics artist and painter (Girls' Romances, Superman's Girl Friend, Lois Lane, The Superman Family), dies at age 58.

=== February ===
- February 1: Edmond Hamilton, American science fiction and comic writer (Space Ranger, DC Comics), dies at age 72.
- February 8: Craig Pineo, American comics artist (Finn Fathom, Ex-Frogman, various advertising comics), dies at age 55.
- February 11: Ben Batsford, American comics artist (Mortimer Snerd and Charlie McCarthy, Billy's Uncle, continued Doings of the Duffs, Little Annie Rooney and The Boomers (aka Frankie Doodle), dies at age 83.
- February 16: Frank Engli, American animator and comics artist, letterer and colorist (On the Wing, Rocky the Stone Age Kid, Looking Back, assisted Dumb Dora, coloured and lettered Terry and the Pirates, Male Call, Steve Canyon, Scorchy Smith), dies at age 70.
- February 21: John Hubley, American animator, film director and comics artist (Mr. Magoo, Zuckerkandl!) dies at age 62.
- Specific date unknown: Irving Spector, American animator and comics artist (Coogy, Little Lionel, Punchy the Black Crow), dies at age 62.

=== March ===
- March 6: Pop Hollinger, American comic book collector and retailer, dies at age 90.
- March 20: Han Krug, Dutch illustrator and comics artist (Juffrouw Snater, Het Avontuur van Knor-Knor), dies at age 86.
- March 23: Ed Dobrotka, American comics artist (continued Superboy, Lois Lane, co-creator of Toyman), dies at age 69.
- March 31: Alexey Komarov, Russian painter, sculptor, cartoonist, illustrator, poster artist and comics artist (Every Woman Should Know How To Raise A Child Properly), dies at age 97.

=== April ===
- April: Paul Gustavson, American comics writer and artist (The Human Bomb, The Angel), dies at age 60.
- April 8: Jean Cézard, French comics artist (Arthur le fantôme justicier), dies at age 53.

=== May ===
- May 25:
  - Christian Kittilsen, Norwegian illustrator and comics artist (Grane), dies at age 70.
  - Frans Mandos, Dutch painter, illustrator and comics artist, dies at age 67.

=== June ===
- June 3: Syd Nicholls, Australian comics artist (Fatty Finn), falls from his apartment balcony and dies at age 80.
- June 6: Joseph Musial, American comics writer (Flash Gordon), artist (continued The Katzenjammer Kids, assisted on Barney Google, Blondie, Bringing Up Father,...) and author (The Career Guide for Cartoonists), dies at age 72.
- June 10: Wood Cowan, American comics artist (worked on Vivian the Vamp, Them Were the Days, Mom 'n' Pop, Oh, Diana, Our Boarding House, Sissy), dies at age 90.
- June 16: Stan Cross, American-Australian comics artist (Wally and the Major, The Potts), dies at age 88.

=== July ===
- July 5: Theo Funke Küpper, Dutch comics artist (De Verstrooide Professor), dies at age 72.
- July 8: Roy Crane, American comics artist (Wash Tubbs, Captain Easy, Buz Sawyer), dies at age 75.
- July 9: Alfred Georges Pavis, French painter, illustrator and comics artist, dies at age 91.
- July 18: Rie Cramer, Dutch illustrator, novelist and comics artist (published text comics in Zonneschijn and Doe Mee), dies at age 89.
- Specific date unknown: Milt Stein, American animator and comics artist (Supermouse), commits suicide at age 56.

=== August ===
- August 1: Bernard van Vlijmen, Dutch painter, graphic artist, illustrator and comics artist (created occasional comics for Ons Eigen Tijdschrift), dies at age 81.
- Specific date unknown: August: Louis Cazeneuve, Argentine comics artist (co-creator of Red Raven), dies at age 68 or 69.

=== September ===
- September 5: Tatsuo Yoshida, Japanese manga artist and animator (Speed Racer), dies at age 45 from liver cancer.
- September 7: Alexis, French comics artist (Al Crane, Cinémastock, Superdupont, Le Transperceneige), dies at age 30 of a ruptured aneurysm.
- September 17: Pierre Soymier, French illustrator and comics artist, dies at age 73.
- September 29: Bob McKimson, American animator, illustrator and comics artist (Looney Tunes), dies at age 66 from a heart attack.

=== October ===
- October 5: Jotie T'Hooft, Belgian poet and comics artist (Jesus Superstar), commits suicide by a drug overdose at age 21.
- October 12: Antoon Heckenrath, Belgian comics artist (De Wonderlijke Reis van Jan Knap, In de Greep van de Octopus), dies at age 70.
- October 28:
  - Ratip Tahir Burak, Turkish comics artist and editorial cartoonist, dies at age 72 or 73.
  - Miguel Mihura, Spanish playwright and comics artist, dies at age 72.

=== November ===
- November 4: Mingo, Spanish comics artist (Don Tibucio, Don Lucas, Sandalio), dies at age 34 or 35.
- November 5: René Goscinny, French comics writer (Astérix, Lucky Luke, Oumpah-pah, Le Petit Nicolas, Iznogoud), artist, magazine publisher, chief editor (Pilote and animation director, dies at age 51.
- November 26: Nikol Dimitriadis, Greek-German comics artist (worked for Mosaik magazine, Rolf Kauka), dies at age 68.

=== December ===
- December 11:
  - Giovanni Bissietta, A.K.A. Giuseppe Fontanelli, Italian painter, illustrator and comics artist (early unlicensed Italian comics based on Mickey Mouse), dies at age 67.
  - Victor Weixler, Austrian illustrator and comic artist (Bobby, der Grosse Sportsmann), dies at age 94.
- December 15: John Verpoorten, American comics inker and Marvel Comics production manager, dies at age 37.

=== Specific date unknown ===
- Robert Baldwin, also known as Rupe, American comics artist and cartoonist (Freddy), dies at age 72 or 73.
- Alberto Cognigni, Argentine comics artist (Negrazón and Chaveta), dies at age 44 or 45.
- Fokion Dimitriadis, Greek editorial cartoonist and comic artist (comics about historical subjects), dies at age 82 or 83.
- John Gee, American illustrator and comics artist (The Timbertoes), dies at age 81 or 82.
- Walter Hofmann, aka Von Waldl, German caricaturist and comics artist (worked for Nazi publications during World War II), dies at age 71 or 72.
- Moma Markovic, Serbian-Canadian comics artist (Stojadin, Rista Sportista), dies at age 74 or 75.
- Héctor Germán Oesterheld, Argentine journalist and comics writer (El Sargento Kirk, Ernie Pike, El Eternauta, Mort Cinder) mysteriously disappears, presumed arrested and murdered by soldiers of President Jorge Rafael Videla's regime.
- Jack Pamby, British comics artist, dies at age 68 or 69.
- Gottfried Spachholz, German comics artist (propaganda comics for the DDR magazine Berliner Zeitung), dies at age 70 or 71.
- Peter Sutherland, British comics artist (continued Alf Tupper), dies at age 55 or 56.
- Wu Yun, Chinese comics artist, dies at age 54 or 55.

== Exhibitions and shows ==
There were many TV shows based on comics in 1977, featuring Spider-Man, Captain America, Doctor Strange, and Wonder Woman.

== Conventions ==
- Columbus Comic Book Convention (Columbus, Ohio) — guests include Jim Steranko, Bob Layton, and Mike Nasser
- Dayton Comic Book Convention (Convention Center, Dayton, Ohio) — produced by Dayton retailer The Dragon's Lair
- January 30: Comicove 6 (Holiday Inn, Paramus, New Jersey) — official guest: Vince Colletta
- March 11–13: Starcon '77 (Airport Holiday Inn, Buffalo, New York)
- May 28–30: Detroit Triple Fan Fair (Troy Hilton, Troy, MI) — dubbed the "Detroit Triple Fan Fair (in Exile)"; guests include Chuck Jones, Ray Harryhausen
- June: Houstoncon (Houston, Texas) — guests include Frank Brunner, Spanky McFarland, Jock Mahoney, George Takei, Forrest J Ackerman, and Roy Rogers
- July 1–5: Comic Art Convention (Hotel Sheraton, Philadelphia, Pennsylvania) — 10th annual show, first time in Philadelphia. Guests of honor: John Stanley and Bernie Wrightson; other guests include Roy Thomas, Wendy Pini, Linda Behrle, Barry Windsor-Smith, Frank Thorne, Frank Brunner, and Jeff Jones
- July 20–24: San Diego Comic-Con (El Cortez Hotel, San Diego, California) — 4,000+ attendees; official guests: Carl Barks, C. C. Beck, Walter Gibson, Robert A. Heinlein, Michael Kaluta, Jack Kirby, B. Kliban, Joe Kubert, Harvey Kurtzman, Stan Lynde, Alex Niño, Trina Robbins, and Bill Scott
- July 29–31: Konvention of Alternative Komix "KAK 77" (Air Galleries, London, England, UK) — 2nd annual underground comix event, produced by Arts Lab Press and Hunt Emerson
- July 29–30: Toronto Triple Fan Fair a.k.a. "Fan Fair 4" (Carleton Inn, Toronto, ON, Canada) — Guests of Honour: Philip José Farmer and Andrew I. Porter
- August 1: Comic Mart Liverpool I (Bluecoat Chambers concert hall, Liverpool, UK) — 10th edition of the show, sponsored by Zephyr Magazines
- August 5–7: Chicago Comicon (Pick-Congress Hotel, 520 S. Michigan Ave., Chicago, Illinois) — produced by Joe Sarno, Mike Gold, and Bob Weinberg; guests include Stan Lee, Jenette Kahn, Chester Gould, and Howard Chaykin
- August 12–14: Atlanta Comics & Fantasy Fair (Dunfey's Royal Coach, Atlanta, Georgia) — official guests include Jenette Kahn, Dick Giordano, Kenneth Smith, Neal Adams, and Jim Steranko
- September: OrlandoCon (Orlando, Florida) — guests include Ralph Dunagin and Scorchy Smith's Edmond Good
- September 3–4: Comicon '77 (British Comic Art Convention) (Bloomsbury Centre Hotel, London, England) — organized by Rob Barrow; presentation of the first annual Eagle Awards
- September 10–11: Lancaster Comic Art Convention "Frazetta '77" (Penn Stroud Hilton Inn, Stroudsburg, Pennsylvania) — produced by Chuck Miller and Charlie Roberts; guests include Harvey Kurtzman, Will Eisner, Jerry Robinson, Burne Hogarth, Bernie Wrightson, Steve Hickman, Michael Kaluta, Charles Vess, Ian Ballantine, Betty Ballantine, and Ken Kelley
- October 8: Comic Mart Liverpool II (Bluecoat Chambers concert hall, Liverpool, UK) — featured a The Adventures of Superman radio show airing, as well as viewings of the Batman and Adventures of Captain Marvel serials
- October 15–16: Newcon '77 (New England Comic Art Convention) (Sheraton-Boston Hotel, Boston, Massachusetts)
- November 25–27: Creation Comic Book & Pop Culture Convention (Statler Hilton Hotel, New York City) — guests include George Pérez; admission: $5/day

== Awards ==
=== Eagle Awards ===
Presented in 1978 for comics published in 1977:

- Favourite Writer: Steve Englehart
- Favourite Artist: Neal Adams
- Favourite Inker: Terry Austin
- Favourite Comic Book (Dramatic): Uncanny X-Men
- Favorite Comic Book (Humor): Howard the Duck, by Steve Gerber and Gene Colan
- Favourite Black and White Magazine: Savage Sword of Conan
- Favourite Single Story: "The Final Threat," Avengers Annual #7, by Jim Starlin
- Favourite Continued Story: Avengers Annual #7 and Marvel Two-in-One Annual #2, by Jim Starlin
- Favourite Group or Team: Uncanny X-Men
- Favourite Character: Batman
- Favourite Supporting Character: Pip the Troll
- Favourite Villain: Thanos
- Favourite Comic (UK): 2000 AD (Fleetway)
- Favourite Editor (UK): Dez Skinn, for MAD magazine
- Roll of Honour: Steve Englehart

== First issues by title ==
=== DC Comics ===
Black Lightning

Release: April. Writer: Jenny Blake Isabella. Artist: Trevor Von Eeden.

DC Special Series: catch-all series primarily for one-shots of different formats, released on an irregular schedule

Release: September. Editor: Paul Levitz.

Jonah Hex

Release: March/April. Writer: Michael Fleisher. Artist: José Luis García-López.

Men of War

Release: August. Editor: Paul Levitz.

Shade, the Changing Man

Release: June/July. Writers: Steve Ditko and Michael Fleisher. Artist: Steve Ditko.

Star Hunters

Release: October /November Writer: David Michelinie. Artists: Don Newton and Bob Layton.

=== Marvel Comics ===
Black Panther

Release: January. Writer/Artist: Jack Kirby.

Godzilla: King of the Monsters

Release: August. Writer: Doug Moench. Artists: Herb Trimpe and Jim Mooney.

John Carter, Warlord of Mars

Release: June. Writer: Marv Wolfman. Artists: Gil Kane and Dave Cockrum.

Human Fly

Release: September. Writer: Bill Mantlo. Artists: Lee Elias.

Logan's Run

Release: January. Writer: Gerry Conway. Artists: George Pérez and Klaus Janson.

Marvel Super Action

Release: May. Reprints classic Captain America stories.

Marvel Super Special

Premiere issues features the rock band Kiss in a 40-page fictional adventure written by Steve Gerber, penciled by Alan Weiss, John Buscema, Rich Buckler, and Sal Buscema.

The Rampaging Hulk

Release: January by Curtis Magazines. Editor: John Warner.

Star Wars

Release: July. Writer: Roy Thomas. Artist: Howard Chaykin.

What If

Release: February. Writer/Editor: Roy Thomas.

=== Independent publishers ===
2000 AD

Release: February 26 by IPC Media. Editor: Tharg the Mighty.

Cerebus the Aardvark

Release: December by Aardvark-Vanaheim. Writer/Artist: Dave Sim.

Heavy Metal

Release: April by HM Communications, Inc. Editor: Sean Kelly and Valerie Marchant.

Rip Off Comix

Release: April by Rip Off Press.

=== Hakusensha ===
Bessatsu Hana to Yume

Release: July

== Initial appearance by character name ==
=== DC Comics ===
- Baron Blitzkrieg, in World's Finest Comics #246 (August /September)
- Black Lightning, in Black Lightning #1 (April)
- Celsius, in Showcase #94 (August /September)
- Joshua Clay, in Showcase #94 (August /September)
- Dawnstar, in Superboy and the Legion of Super-Heroes #226 (April)
- Doctor Phosphorus, in Detective Comics #469 (May)
- Cal Durham, in Adventure Comics #452 (July)
- Faora, in Action Comics #471 (May)
- Godiva, in Super Friends #7 (October)
- Golden Glider, in Flash #250 (June)
- Gravedigger, in Men of War #1 (August)
- Huntress, in DC Super Stars # 17 (November /December 1977)
- Icemaiden, in Super Friends #9 (December)
- Impala, in Super Friends #7 (October)
- Infinite Man, in Superboy and the Legion of Super-Heroes #233 (November)
- Jack O'Lantern, in Super Friends #8 (November)
- Owlwoman, in Super Friends #7 (October)
- Patty Spivot, in DC Special Series #1 (September)
- Peter Gambi, in Black Lightning #1 (April)
- Professor Ojo, in Richard Dragon, Kung Fu Fighter #16 (July/August)
- Quakemaster, in DC Special #28 (July)
- Rising Sun, in Super Friends #8 (November)
- Scalphunter in Weird Western Tales #39 (March /April)
- Seraph, in Super Friends #7 (October)
- Shade, the Changing Man, in Shade, the Changing Man #1 (June/July)
- Silver St. Cloud, in Detective Comics #470 (June)
- Sklarian Raiders, in Superboy and the Legion of Super-Heroes #233 (November)
- Pulsar Stargrave, in Superboy and the Legion of Super-Heroes #223 (January)
- Tasmanian Devil, in Super Friends #7 (October)
- Rupert Thorne, in Detective Comics #469 (May)
- Tuatara, in Super Friends #8 (November)
- Valentina Vostok, in Showcase #94 (August)
- Tobias Whale, in Black Lightning #1 (April)

=== Marvel Comics ===
- Aqueduct, in Ghost Rider #23 (April)
- Aries, in The Defenders #49 (July)
- Bereet, in The Rampaging Hulk #1 (January)
- Bushmaster, in Iron Fist #15 (September)
- Constrictor, in The Incredible Hulk #212 (June)
- Deathbird, in Ms. Marvel #9 (September)
- Devil-Slayer, in Marvel Spotlight #33 (April)
- Doctor Bong, in Howard the Duck #15 (August)
- Dreadknight, in Iron Man #102 (August)
- Dyna-Mite / Destroyer, in Invaders #14 (March)
- Celestials
  - Dreaming Celestial, in The Eternals #18 (December)
  - Eson the Searcher, in The Eternals #9 (March)
  - Hargen the Measurer, in The Eternals #9 (March)
  - Jemiah the Analyzer, in The Eternals #7 (January)
  - Nezarr the Calculator, in The Eternals #9 (March)
  - One Above All, in The Eternals #7 (January)
  - Oneg the Prober, in The Eternals #9 (March)
  - Tefral the Surveyor, in The Eternals #7 (January)
  - Ziran the Tester, in The Eternals #18 (December)
- Eternals
  - Aginar, in The Eternals #11 (May)
  - Delphan Brothers, in The Eternals #11 (May)
  - Druig, in The Eternals #11 (May)
  - Forgotten One, in The Eternals #13 (July)
  - Sigmar, in The Eternals #17 (November)
  - Sprite, in The Eternals #9 (March)
  - Kingo Sunen, in The Eternals #11 (May)
  - Uni-Mind, in The Eternals #12 (June)
  - Valkin, in The Eternals #11 (May)
  - Zarin, in The Eternals #11 (May)
- Henry Peter Gyrich, in Avengers #165 (November)
- Human Fly (Rick Rojatt), in Human Fly #1 (September)
- Imperial Guard, in X-Men #107 (October)
  - Astra
  - Electron
  - Fang
  - Flashfire
  - Guardian
  - Magique
  - Mentor
  - Neutron
  - Nightside
  - Oracle
  - Pulsar
  - Scintilla
  - Smasher
  - Starbolt
  - Titan
- Jocasta, in Avengers #162 (August)
- Killer Shrike, in The Rampaging Hulk #1 (January, Curtis Magazines)
- Lightmaster, in Peter Parker, the Spectacular Spider-Man #3 (February)
- Machine Man, in 2001: A Space Odyssey #8 (July)
- Malice, in Ghost Rider vol. 2, #25 (August)
- Paragon / Kismet, in The Incredible Hulk Annual #6
- Ringer, in Defenders #51 (September)
- Rocket Racer, in The Amazing Spider-Man #172 (September)
- Sabretooth, in Iron Fist #14 (August)
- Nicholas Scratch, in Fantastic Four #185 (August)
- Sphinx, in Nova #6 (February)
- Spider-Woman (Jessica Drew), in Marvel Spotlight #32 (February)
- Spirit of '76, in The Invaders #14 (March)
- Starjammers, in X-Men #107 (October)
  - Ch'od, in X-Men #104 (April)
  - Corsair, in X-Men #104 (April)
  - Hepzibah, in X-Men #107 (October)
  - Raza Longknife, in X-Men #107 (October)
- Swarm, in Champions #14 (July)
- Warrior Woman, in Invaders #16 (May)
- Will O' Wisp, in The Amazing Spider-Man #167 (April)
- Arnim Zola, in Captain America #208 (April)

=== Other titles ===
- Rico Dredd, in 2000 AD prog 30 (Fleetway)
- Judge Dredd, in 2000 AD #2 (Fleetway)
- Judge Giant, in 2000 AD prog 27 (Fleetway)
- Judge Goodman, in 2000 AD #2 (Fleetway)
- Alvar Mayor, a Peruvian mestizo involved in the Spanish conquest, by Carlos Trillo and Enrique Breccia, in Skorpio.
- Petra Cherie, by Attilio Micheluzzi, in Il giornalino (February 20)
- Bill Savage, in 2000 AD #1 (February 26, Fleetway)
- Tharg the Mighty, in 2000 AD #1 (February 26, Fleetway)
- Thorgal, by Jean Van Hamme and Grzegor Rosinski, in Tintin (March 22)
- Ken Parker, by Giancarlo Berardi and Ivo Milazzo (June, CEPIM)
- Cerebus the Aardvark, in Cerebus #1 (December, Aardvark-Vanaheim)
