= 1981 in comics =

Notable events of 1981 in comics.

== Events and publications ==
=== January ===
- January 24: In Linus, first episode of Rebecca, by Anna Brandoli and Renato Queirolo. The series has for protagonist a gypsy girl, looking for the St. Ambrose treasure in the Fifteenth century Lombardy.
- January 25: In Il Giornalino, first episode of the series Father Brown’s tales, by Renata Gelardini and Tommaso Landolfi, from G. K. Chesterton.
- Capital Comics makes its entrée into publishing with the release of Nexus #1.
- Frank Miller takes over full writing duties on Daredevil with issue #168, creating Elektra.
- The "Days of Future Past" storyline debuts in Uncanny X-Men #141 (continues in Uncanny X-Men #142).
- The reprint title Marvel's Greatest Comics, with issue #96, is cancelled by Marvel.
- The reprint title Amazing Adventures vol. 3, with issue #14, is cancelled by Marvel.
- The reprint title Tales to Astonish vol. 2, with issue #14, is cancelled by Marvel.
- Les chiens meurent en hiver by Yves Swolfs, first album of the western series Durango; the hero is inspired by the Jean-Louis Trintignant’s character in The great silence.
- Le demon blanc (White devil) by Derib, 10th album of the Buddy Longway series (Le Lombard).
- Tribunal noir (Black tribunal) by André-Paul Duchateau and Tibet, 32. qlbum of the Ric Hochet series.
- Les trois vieillards du pays d’Aran (The three old men in Aran country), by Jean Van Hamme and Grzegorz Rosiński, 3. album of the Thorgal series.
- First issue of Necron by Magnus and Ilaria Volpe (Edifumetto).

=== February ===
- February 22: in Topolino, Paperobot contro i Paperoidi (Duck Robot vs. Duck aliens) by Romano Scarpa, first (and only) episode of the sci-fi series Storie stellari (Star stories).
- Jenette Kahn becomes president of DC Comics, succeeding Sol Harrison. Kahn retained the title of publisher, which she had held since 1976.
- Legion of Super-Heroes vol. 2 #272 features an insert previewing the upcoming "Dial H for Hero" series in Adventure Comics by Marv Wolfman and Carmine Infantino.
- New York the big city by Will Eisner.

=== March ===
- March 1.: in the Spanish Magazine Cimoc, debut of El mercenario by Vicente Segrelles.
- March 1: in Pilote, Brooklyn Station, Terminus Cosmos by Pierre Christin and Jean-Claude Mezieres, 10th episode of the Valerian series, is prepublished.
- March 8: The final episode of Stan Lynde's Rick O'Shay is published.
- March 8. In Topolino, Paperino di Bergerac (Donald of Bergerac), by Guido Martina and Giovan Battista Carpi, parody of Edmond Rostand’s Cyrano de Bergerac, is prepublished.
- March 17: In a widely mediatized event, Hergé finally meets his old Chinese friend Zhang Chongren again in Brussels, whom he hadn't seen again for almost half a century. Zhang was the inspiration for the Tintin character Chang Chong-Chen. Hergé's longing to see his old friend again inspired the story Tintin in Tibet.
- March 19: The first episode of Raoul Cauvin and Philippe Bercovici's Les Femmes en Blanc is published in Spirou.
- Robert Crumb launches the American adult comics magazine Weirdo, which will run until 1993.
- Marvel takes notice of the growing direct market and produces a title specifically for comic shops — Dazzler #1 sells 400,000 copies.
- Marvel Preview (published until now by the Marvel imprint Curtis Magazines), with issue #25, changes its name to Bizarre Adventures and becomes an official Marvel Comics publication.
- Detective Comics #500: 84 pages, 7 different anniversary stories by several well-known creators, including television writer Alan Brennert and Walter B. Gibson, best known for his work on the pulp fiction character The Shadow.
- "The Exaggerated Death of Ultra Boy" story arc begins in DC Comics' Legion of Super-Heroes #273. Written by Gerry Conway, Roy Thomas, and Paul Levitz, with pencils by Jimmy Janes and Steve Ditko, the story arc concludes in Legion of Super-Heroes #282 (December).
- Mystery in Space (1951 series), with issue #117, is cancelled by DC Comics.
- Captain Canuck, with issue #14, is cancelled by Comely Comix.
- John Byrne and Terry Austin leave The Uncanny X-Men, with issue 143 being their last.
- In Frigidaire, Giallo scolastico (A school mystery) by Andrea Pazienza, the anti-hero Zanardi, a young hooligan, nihilist and drug-addicted, makes his debut.

=== April ===
- Jan Bucquoy launches the Belgian adult comics magazine Spetters. It will last until 1982.
- Steve Warson contre Michel Vaillant by Jean Graton, 38th episode of the Michel Vaillant series.

=== May ===
- May 3: in Topolino, Zio Paperone e il tuffo nel black hole (Scrooge McDuck jumps in the black hole) by Giorgio Pezzin and Guido Scala; the story is published simultaneously with the release in Italy of the film The black hole.
- May 8: The first issue of Eclipse Magazine is published by Dean and Jan Mullaney. It will run until January 1983.
- May 10: in Il giornalino, the comic-adventure series Captain Rogers, by Giorgio Pezzin and Giorgio Cavazzano, makes his debut; the hero is an American trapper, fighting against the English in the War of independence.
- May 19: in Tele junior, Le bandit manchot (The slot machine) by Morris and Bob de Groot, 81th episode of Lucky Luke series, is pre-published.
- Master of Kung Fu #100: "Red of Fang and Claw, All Love Lost," by Doug Moench, Mike Zeck, and Gene Day.
- Ghosts #100 (DC Comics): Edited by Jack C. Harris.
- With issue #66, Charlton revives The Many Ghosts of Doctor Graves, cancelled in May 1978.

=== June ===
- June 15: Doug Marlette's Kudzu makes its debut. It will run until 2007.
- June 26: In Berkeley Breathed's Bloom County Opus the Penguin makes his debut.
- Weird War Tales #100 (DC Comics)
- Final issue of The Hulk! published by Curtis Magazines.
- First issue of Charlton Bullseye (Charlton)
- Debut of the comics industry magazine Amazing Heroes (published by the Fantagraphics imprint Zam, Inc.. With later issues, until it folds in 1992, Amazing Heroes will be "officially" published by Fantagraphics).
- Rallye sur un vulcan by Jean Graton, 39th episode of the Michel Vaillant series.
- In the Spanish magazine cimoc, the war reporter Frank Kappa, by Manfred Sommer, makes his debut.
- In the Argentinian magazine Superhumor, the inept New York cop Merdichesky, by Carlos Trillo and Horacio Altura, makes his debut.

=== July ===
- Superman and Spider-Man, "The Heroes and the Holocaust," a DC/Marvel intercompany crossover ("sequel" to 1976's Superman vs. the Amazing Spider-Man).
- Man-Thing vol. 2, with issue #11, is cancelled by Marvel.
- John Byrne begins his 62-issue run as writer/artist on Fantastic Four with issue #232.
- In Italy, first issue of the weekly magazine Paperino & c. (Mondadori), publishing Danish and American Disney comics.

=== August ===
- August 5: in Le matin de Paris, first chapter of La jeunesse de Corto Maltese (Corto Maltese’s youth) by Hugo Pratt and Patrizia Zanotti.:
- DC's The Flash reaches its 300th issue and celebrates its 25th anniversary.
- Justice League of America #193 features an insert previewing the upcoming All-Star Squadron series by Roy Thomas and Rich Buckler.
- Final issue of Marvel Premiere (#61) published by Marvel Comics
- With issue #47, DC cancels Super Friends.
- "Doomquest" storyline debuts in Iron Man #149 (continues in Iron Man #150)
- The Warlord #48 features an insert previewing the upcoming Arak, Son of Thunder series by Roy Thomas and Ernie Colón.

=== Fall ===
- DC Special Series #27 — Batman vs. The Incredible Hulk, an intercompany crossover between DC and Marvel Comics. This marks the final issue of DC Special Series (1977 series), a catch-all series primarily for one-shots of different formats, released on an irregular schedule.

=== September ===
- September 5: in 2000 AD, first strip of Rogue Trooper, by Gerry Finley-Day and Dave Gibbons.
- September 20: Jean Dulieu wins the Stripschapprijs. Patty Klein, Annemieke and Har van Fulpen win The Jaarprijs voor Bijzondere Verdiensten (nowadays the P. Hans Frankfurtherprijs).
- September 21: Guy Gilchrist and Brad Gilchrist's newspaper comic based on The Muppet Show is published for the first time and in more than 80 countries across the world on the same simultaneous date. An exceptional event.
- September 24:
  - Kamagurka and Herr Seele's Cowboy Henk makes its debut in De Morgen.
  - Toon van Driel's gag comic Hullie debuts in Algemeen Dagblad, where it will run until 2001.
- Le scandale Ric Hochet by André-Paul Duchâteau and Tibet, 33th episode of the Ric Hochet series (Le Lombard).

=== October ===
- October 18: in Il giornalino, Nicoletta, by Clod and Claudio Nizzi, makes her debut.
- The Defenders #100: Double-sized issue written by J.M. DeMatteis. (Marvel Comics)
- "Block Mania" storyline begins in 2000 AD. (continues through December)
- The Hunting Party, by Pierre Christin and Enik Bilal (Dargaud)
- Asterix and the black gold – by Uderzo (Editons Albert-René).
- La tour de Babele by Jacques Martin, 16. album of the Alix series.

=== November ===
- November 1: In the Italian Disney magazine Topolino, the Donald Duck story The Tourist at the End of the Universe, by Giorgio Cavazzano and Carlo Chendi marks the debut of O. K. Quack.
- November 2: Steve Bell's political comic strip If debuts in The Guardian. It will run until 2021.
- November 22: in Il giornalino, Rosco and Sonny, by Claudio Nizzi and Giancarlo Alessandrini, make their debut.
- November 26: in Spirou, first chapter of La Ceinture du grand froid, by Nic Broca and Raoul Cauvin.
- Jinty merges with Tammy (Fleetway).
- Pacific Comics makes its entree into publishing with the release of Jack Kirby's Captain Victory and the Galactic Rangers #1
- The reprint title Marvel Super Action, with issue #37, is cancelled by Marvel.
- In Linus, the shabby private eye Joe Balordo by Benito Jacovitti, makes his debut; the series, very short lived (only two episodes), for its explicitly sexual contents, is one of the few comics by the author aimed to an adult audience.

=== December ===
- December 17: Stéphane Colman and Stephen Desberg's Billy the Cat makes its debut in Spirou.
- December 23: The final issue of the French satirical comics magazine Charlie Hebdo is published. It will be relaunched in July 1992.
- In Italy, first issue of the magazine Pilot (Bonelli), specialized in French comics; it contains L’uomo di carta (Paper man) by Milo Manara, a western adventure on the natives’ side, already published in France.
- Specific date unknown: Bill and Steve Schanes establish Pacific Comics.

=== Specific date unknown ===
- Norman Dog starts his long-running comics series Bad Habits.
- Walt Disney's Uncle $crooge McDuck: His Life and Times, by Carl Barks. The book includes, beyond an anthology of the best stories with Uncle Scrooge, the unpublished short tale Go slowly, sands of time, written and illustrated in watercolor by Barks himself.
- Claire Bretécher ends Les Frustrés in Le Nouvel Observateur, where it had run since 1973.
- David Sutherland introduces Olive Sprat, the cafetaria cook, in The Bash Street Kids.
- The first episode of Tete Cohete by Francisco Ibáñez Talavera is published.
- Loesje Raymakers and Carla Schrama release the photo comic Calla & Lucy Go West.

== Deaths ==
=== February ===
- February 16: William Edwin Pidgeon, Australian comics artist (The Trifling Triplets, In and Out of Society), dies at age 72, from complications of a traffic accident.
- February 20: Enzo Magni, aka Ingam, Italian comics artist (Pantera Bionda), dies at age 76.
- February 22: Michael Maltese, American screenwriter and comics writer (Looney Tunes and Hanna-Barbera comics), dies at age 73 from cancer.
- February 25: Arne Ungerman, Danish painter and comics artist (Hanne Hansen), dies at age 78.
- February 29: Carlo Bisi, Italian comics artist (Sor Pampurio), dies at age 91.

=== March ===
- March 10: Jack Oleck, American novelist and comics writer (wrote horror comics for EC Comics and DC Comics and series like Kong the Untamed) dies at age 67.
- March 17: Emile Mercier, Australian comics artist (Tripalong Hoppity, Wocko the Beaut, Doc McSwiggle, Bowyang Bill and the Princess, The Case of the Haunted Piecrust, Search for the Gnu-Gnah, Speed Umplestoop, Supa Dupa Man, Three Gun Ferdie), dies at age 79.
- March 31: Cees van de Weert, Dutch illustrator and comics artist (Marco Polo, worked for Marten Toonder), dies at age 63.
- American comics writer and artist Richard Loederer, also known as Dick Loederer, dies at age 86 or 87.

=== April ===
- April 18: Tage Anderson, Danish illustrator and comics artist (Willy på Eventyr), dies at age 58.
- April 23: Vivie Risto, American animator and comics artist (Disney comics, particularly Bucky Bug, Looney Tunes comics), dies at age 78.
- April 24: Howard Purcell, American comics artist (co-creator of Sargon the Sorcerer, Gay Ghost, Enchantress), dies at age 62.

=== May ===
- May 7: Jaap Veenendaal, aka Javé, Dutch comics artist, painter and illustrator (Bongo), dies at age 77.
- May 12: Henry Formhals, American comics artist (continued Freckles and His Friends, assisted on Ella Cinders and Joe Jinks), dies at age 72.
- May 25: George Clark, American comics artist (The Neighbors, Side Glances), dies at age 78.

=== June ===
- June 7: Arnold Molenaar, Dutch illustrator and comics artist (Daantje Driest, Flip Kater), dies at age 76.
- June 11: Eppo Doeve, Indonesian-Dutch illustrator and comics artist (Mannetje Bagatel, Kleine Isar, de Vierde Koning), dies at age 73.
- June 19: Lotte Reiniger, German film director and animator (The Adventures of Prince Achmed), dies at age 82.

=== July ===
- July 17: Odd Harrong, Norwegian comedian, singer and comics artist (Bokholder Blidberg, Harrongs Komikk, Blidberg og Stribert, Kjakan, Jumbo, Samegutten Anti, Knokkelmannen, Den Usynlige Mannen), dies at age 68.

=== August ===
- August 5: Ton Smits, Dutch cartoonist and comics artist (Tommy, Karel Kwiek, Daniel Daazer, Dolly en de Juwelenroof), dies at age 60.
- August 13: Gustaaf De Bruyne, Belgian painter and comics artist (De Opwindende Verhalen van Carlo Guzzi), dies at age 67.
- August 25: Guillermo Cardoso, Mexican comics artist and illustrator (worked on Little Lulu, Disney comics), dies at age 59.
- August 27: Fred Fox, American screenwriter, gag writer, comics writer (continued Ella Cinders, Freckles and His Friends, Odd Bodkins) and artist (continued Good Time Guy), dies at age 79.
- August 31: Nikos Kastanakis, Greek painter and comics artist (worked on the Classics Illustrated series), dies at age 84 or 85.

=== September ===
- September 2: Andrija Maurović, Montenegrin-Croatian comics artist (Stari Macak, Dan, Old Tom-cat and Radoslav) dies at age 80.
- September 29: Aage Grauballe, Danish journalist and comics writer (Willy på Eventyr)), dies at age 56.

=== October ===
- October 12: Lawrence Lariar, American comics artist, writer, novelist, editor and cartoonist (Barry O'Neill, Best Cartoons of the Year series), dies at age 72.
- October 14: Jim Raymond, American comics artist (continued Blondie, assisted on Jungle Jim), dies at age 64.
- October 29: Pierre Noël, French illustrator (drew picture stories), dies at age 78.

=== November ===
- November 2: Wally Wood, American comics artist (Mad Magazine, Sally Forth, Heroes, Inc. Presents Cannon, Daredevil) commits suicide at age 54.
- November 12: Ralph Heimdahl, American animator and comics artist (Bugs Bunny comic strip), dies at age 72.
- November 18: Fredric Wertham, German psychologist and author of the anti-comics book Seduction of the Innocent which paved the way for the Comics Code censorship, dies at age 86.
- November 26: Lou Visser, Dutch comics artist and illustrator (Fred Penner), dies at age 70.

=== December ===
- December 1: Russ Manning, American comics artist (The Aliens, Magnus, Robot Fighter, continued Tarzan), dies at age 52, cancer
- December 4: Raoul Verdini, Italian comics artist (Cipollino, Le Maschere, Chicchirichi), dies at age 81.
- December 9: Édouard Van Overstraeten, aka War Van Overstraeten, Belgian painter, politician, poster artist and editorial cartoonist, dies at age 90.
- Harry "A" Chesler, American comics entrepreneur (Chesler's Studio), dies at age 83.
- George Swanson, American comics artist (Flop Family, Salesman Sam, High Pressure Pete, Officer 67/8, Elza Poppin' ), dies at age 93 or 94.

=== Specific date unknown ===
- Ferdinand Bis, Croatian comics artist (comics for Mickey Strip), dies at age 70 or 71.
- Freddie Chaplain, British comics writer (Rupert Bear), dies at age 67 or 68.
- Noel Cook, New Zealand-Australian comics artist (Roving Peter, Bobby and Betty, Kokey Koala), dies at age 84 or 85.
- Henry Gammidge, British comic writer (scripted James Bond newspaper comic
- Simpson, Paul (2002). The Rough Guide to James Bond. Rough Guides. ISBN 978-1-84353-142-5.
- Ester Gill, Swedish comics artist (Lillans Morgongröt, Den Egenkära Gunilla, Sara), dies at age 87 or 88.
- Sam Leff, American comics artist (continued Joe Jinks as Curly Kayoe), dies at age 64 or 65.
- Dumitru Negrea, Romanian caricaturist, comics artist and illustrator (Misterul învaţătorului Helmuth), dies at age 57 or 58.

== Conventions ==
- May 3: Colorado Comic Art Convention (Rocky Mountain School of Art, Denver, Colorado) — official guests include Kirk Alyn (guest of honor) and John Severin
- June 27–28: Creation Convention (Hyatt Regency, Washington, D.C.) — guests include Stan Lee, Bob Wiacek, Terry Austin, and Savage Sword of Conan artist Kenneth Morris
- July 3–5: Comic Art Convention (Statler Hilton Hotel, 33rd Street and 7th Avenue, New York City) — special guest of honor George Pérez; other official guests include Burne Hogarth, Harvey Kurtzman, Howard Chaykin, Gil Kane, and Art Spiegelman
- July 3–5: Multicon 81 (Lincoln Plaza Inn, Oklahoma City, Oklahoma) — guests include John Byrne, L. B. Cole, Jim Engel, Chuck Fialla, Mike McQuay, John Wooley, and Ron Wolfe
- July 17–19: Chicago Comicon (Pick-Congress Hotel, Chicago, Illinois)
- July 23–26: San Diego Comic Con (El Cortez Hotel, San Diego, California) — 5,000 attendees; official guests: Jerry Bails, Dave Berg, L. B. Cole, Jim Fitzpatrick, Dick Giordano, Bil Keane, Julius Schwartz, Bill Sienkiewicz, and Dave Sim
- August: Atlanta Fantasy Fair (Dunfey's Royal Coach, Atlanta, Georgia) — official guests include Al Williamson, Michael Whelan, Bob Burden, Mike Jittlov
- September: OrlandoCon (Orlando, Florida) — guests include C. C. Beck
- September 19–20: FantaCon '81 (Empire State Plaza Convention Center, Albany, New York)
- October 31–November 1: Comicon '81 (British Comic Art Convention) (Regent Centre Hotel, London, England) — 14th annual (and final) edition; guests include Frank Miller, Alan Davis, Paul Neary, Bryan Talbot, Richard Burton, Bernie Jaye, Martin Asbury, Brian Bolland, John Bolton, John M. Burns, Ron Embleton, Dave Gibbons, Don Lawrence, and Mick Anglo; presentation of the Eagle Awards
- November 14: Mid-Ohio Con (Quality Inn Park Place, Mansfield, Ohio) — special guest of honor: John Byrne
- December 5–6: Greater Cincinnati Comic and Card Convention (Drawbridge Motor Inn, Ft. Mitchell, Kentucky) — special guest Bob Layton

== Awards ==
=== Eagle Awards ===
Presented in 1982 for comics published in 1981:

- Best New Artist: Bill Sienkiewicz
- Roll of Honour: Roy Thomas
- Favourite Artist (UK): Mick Austin

== First issues by title ==
=== DC Comics ===
Arak, Son of Thunder

Release: September Writer: Roy Thomas. Artists: Ernie Colón and Alfredo Alcala.

=== Marvel Comics ===
Dazzler

Release: March. Writer: Tom DeFalco. Artists: John Romita, Jr. and Alfredo Alcala.

Ka-Zar the Savage

Release: April. Writer: Bruce Jones. Artists: Brent Anderson and Carlos Garzon.

=== Other publishers ===
Alien Encounters

Release: by FantaCo Enterprises. Editor: Catherine Yronwode.

Captain Victory and the Galactic Rangers

Release: November by Pacific Comics. Writer/Artist: Jack Kirby.

Charlton Bullseye

Release: June by Charlton Comics. Editor: George Wildman.

Eclipse

Release: May by Eclipse Comics. Editors: Dean Mullaney and Jan Mullaney.

Hatsukoi Scandal

Release: in Shōnen Big Comic by Shogakukan. Author: Akira Oze.

Justice Machine

Release: June by Noble Comics. Writer/Artist: Michael Gustovich.

Love and Rockets

Release: Self-published by Los Bros Hernandez

Nexus

Release: January by Capital Comics. Writer: Mike Baron. Artist: Steve Rude.

Weirdo

Release: March by Last Gasp. Editor: Robert Crumb.

== Initial appearances by character name ==
=== DC Comics ===
- All-Star Squadron in Justice League of America #193 (August)
- Andrew Bennett, in House of Mystery #290 (March)
- Arak in The Warlord #48 (August)
- Arella, in New Teen Titans #3 (January)
- Auron, in Green Lantern #141 (June)
- Arisia Rrab, in Tales of the Green Lantern Corps #1 (May)
- Bushmaster, in Super Friends #45 (June)
- Danette Reilly, in Justice League of America #193 (August)
- Electrocutioner, in Batman #331 (January)
- Fearsome Five in New Teen Titans #3 (January)
  - Gizmo
  - Mammoth
  - Psimon
  - Shimmer
- Houngan, in New Teen Titans #14 (December)
- Mary, Queen of Blood, in House of Mystery #290 (March)
- Nekron, in Tales of the Green Lantern Corps #2 (June)
- Neutron, in Action Comics #525 (November)
- Omega Men in Green Lantern #141 (June)
- Phobia, in New Teen Titans #14 (December)
- Plasmus, in New Teen Titans #14 (December)
- Rod Reilly, in All-Star Squadron #1 (September)
- Trigon, in New Teen Titans #5 (March)
- Typhoon, in The Flash #294 (February)
- Vixen, in Action Comics #521 (July)
- Warp, in New Teen Titans #14 (December)

=== Marvel Comics ===
- Arlok, in What If? #27 (July)
- Astron, in What If? #27 (July)
- Avalanche, in Uncanny X-Men #141 (January)
- Elektra, in Daredevil #168 (January)
- Hybrid, in Rom #17 (April)
- Mad Jim Jaspers, in Marvel Superheroes #377, published by Marvel UK (September)
- Pyro, in Uncanny X-Men #141 (January)
- Rogue, in Avengers Annual #10
- Siryn, in Spider-Woman #37 (April)
- Stick in Daredevil #176 (November)

=== Other publishers ===
- Rogue Trooper in 2000 AD. #228, published by IPC Media
- Syzygy Darklock in The Price, published by Eclipse Comics
- Thrud the Barbarian in the British fanzine Arken Sword
- Zanardi in the Italian anthology Frigidaire
