= Nicola Pesce =

Italian writer and publisher

- Born: April 19, 1984 (age 42); Salerno, Italy
- Occupations: Writer, publisher
- Years active: 2002–present
- Known for: Founder of Edizioni NPE
- Notable work: La volpe che amava i libri La biblioteca dei libri dimenticati

Nicola Pesce (born 19 April 1984) is an Italian writer and publisher. He is the founder of the Italian publishing house Edizioni NPE, known for publishing graphic novels, comics, and illustrated books. As a writer, he is known for novels including La volpe che amava i libri and La biblioteca dei libri dimenticati.

== Career ==
In 2002, Pesce founded the publishing house Edizioni NPE. The company later specialized in republications and collected editions of classic Italian and international comics.

Edizioni NPE published editions dedicated to artists and illustrators, including Sergio Toppi, Dino Battaglia, Attilio Micheluzzi, Franco Caprioli, Benito Jacovitti, and Gianni De Luca.

The publisher also collaborated on projects connected with publishers, including Sergio Bonelli Editore, Astorina, and Disney.

The company published Italian editions and restored collections of works such as Little Nemo in Slumberland. It also released essays and comics-related projects connected to authors and filmmakers, including Tim Burton. Among its best-known non-fiction titles was Eccetto Topolino, a collection of essays on Italian comics culture during the Fascist period that received coverage in Italian media.

In 2022, Pesce launched the publishing imprint Burno Edizioni, focused on fiction and non-fiction titles.

== Writing ==
Pesce began his literary career in 2019 with the publication of the novel Le cose come stanno. He gained wider recognition with the 2021 novel La volpe che amava i libri, centered on literature and reading culture. The novel was later presented at literary events and public meetings in several Italian cities.

In 2022, Pesce began publishing with Arnoldo Mondadori Editore, starting with the novel La volpe che amava le piccole cose.

His 2024 novel La biblioteca dei libri dimenticati received coverage in Italian literary and cultural media and was later published in Greece by Minoas Books.

In 2025, he published the novel Camminando tra i fiori scalzi with Mondadori.

== Public activity ==
Pesce has participated in initiatives promoting reading and literacy in Italy. In 2024, Italian media reported that he donated books to primary schools across the country. He has appeared in television and radio interviews discussing literature, publishing, and reading culture.

== Bibliography ==
- Le cose come stanno (2019, NPE, ISBN 978-88-948188-6-4)
- Il fiato di Edith (2020, NPE, ISBN 978-88-3627-008-8)
- La cura del dolore (2021, NPE, ISBN 978-88-3627-024-8)
- La volpe che amava i libri (2021, NPE, ISBN 978-88-3627-027-9)
- I fiori del bene (2022, Burno, ISBN 979-12-8077-204-6)
- La volpe che amava le piccole cose (2022, Mondadori, ISBN 978-88-04-75504-3)
- Il sapore dell'albicocco (2023, Mondadori, ISBN 978-88-04-77773-1)
- La biblioteca dei libri dimenticati (2024, Mondadori, ISBN 978-88-04-79224-6)
- Il piccolo principe delle tenebre (2025, Burno, ISBN 979-12-8077-241-1)
- Camminando tra i fiori scalzi (2025, Mondadori, ISBN 978-88-04-80537-3)
