= Giancarlo Alessandrini =

Italian comic artist (born 1950)

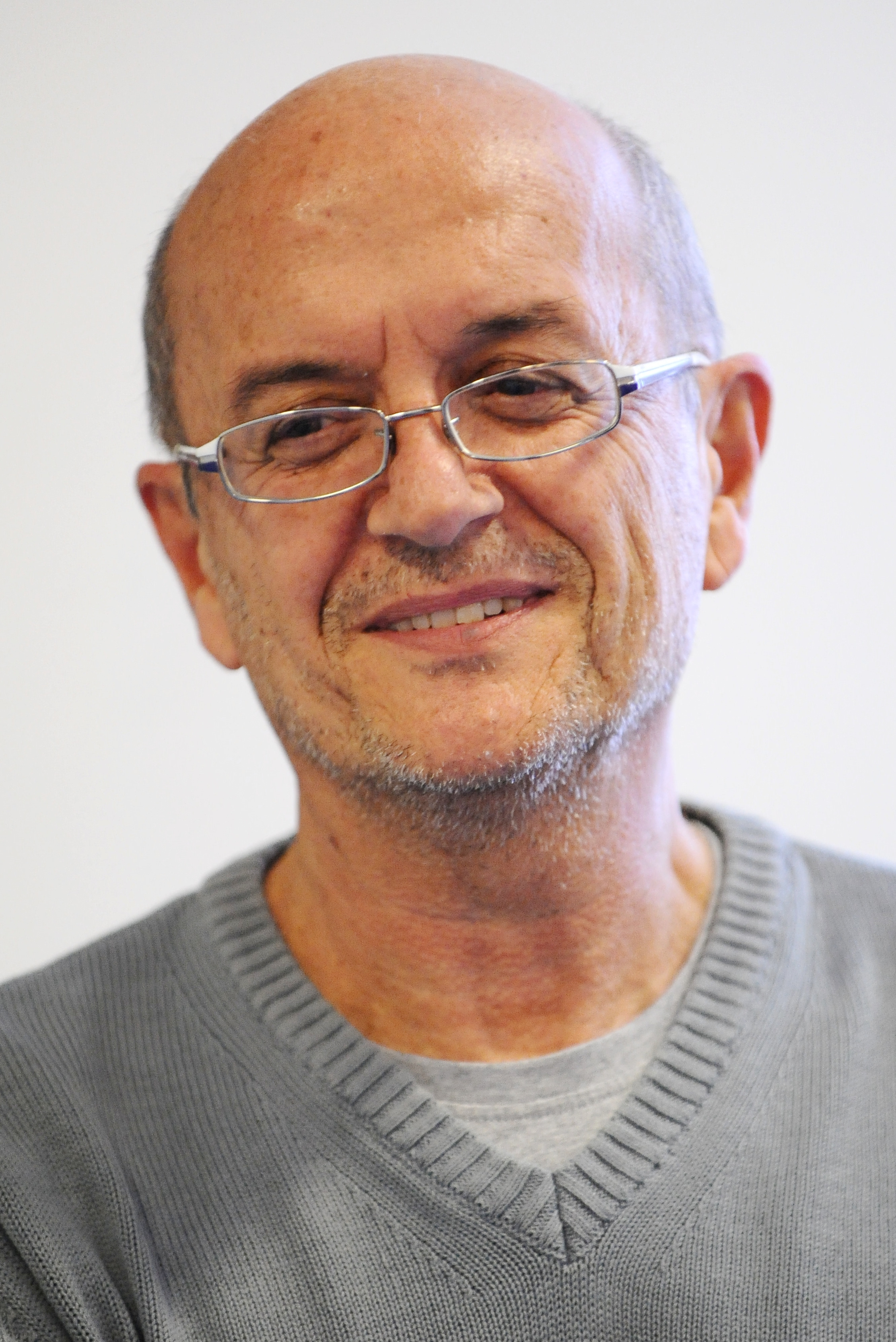
- Giancarlo Alessandrini
- Born: March 20, 1950 (age 76) Iesi, Italy
- Area: Artist
- Awards: Best Artist, ANAF (1991); U Giancu's Prize (2002)

Giancarlo Alessandrini (born March 20, 1950) is an Italian comic artist.

== Biography ==
Born in Iesi, Alessandrini graduated from Ancona's Art Institute and begins drawing comics professionally in 1972 for Il Corriere dei Ragazzi with the story Il Cifrario del Maggiore Martin written by Mino Milani. The following year he produced ten episodes of the fantasy series Anni 2000, again written by Milani, and twelve episodes of Lork Shark two years later.

In 1975 Alessandrini joined Studio Giolitti and drew several war stories for British publisher Fleetway. He continued his cooperation with Il Corriere dei Ragazzi, drawing two episodes of the series Il Maestro, written by Milani. When in 1976 the editor refused some of the pages for the series asking him to redraw them, Alessandrini decided instead to leave.

He then drew Eva Kant for the Italian edition of Cosmopolitan. The series is written by Alfredo Castelli and marks the first of a series of collaborations. In 1976 the two produced L'uomo di Chicago for Bonelli's Un Uomo un'Avventura, then in 1978 they worked together on Allan Quatermain for Supergulp, published by Mondadori and on Mister No, again for Bonelli.

Starting in 1977, Alessandrini worked on the Western series Ken Parker, written by Giancarlo Berardi. His cooperation continued until 1980, resulting in six 96 pages episodes. That same year Alessandrini started working for Catholic weekly Il Giornalino, where he drew some episodes of the series Ai confini dell'avventura and Storie di tutti i tempi. In 1981 he created with scriptwriter Claudio Nizzi the series Rosco & Sonny, using himself as a model for Sonny's features.

But the opportunity that will make Alessandrini a name in the international comics scene presented itself in 1982: Castelli had convinced Bonelli to greenlight a series based on his new character, and asked Alessandrini to design the character and draw the stories. In April of that year Martin Mystère was born. The series was a success, and Alessandrini was to produce all the covers and many of the stories, including specials and spin-offs.

In 1990 Alessandrini drew L'Uomo di Mosca, written by Roberto Dal Prà for Torpedo magazine. The personal style of the art didn't go unnoticed in France, where publisher Bagheera acquired the rights for the French market.

In 1991 Alessandrini and Dal Prà created detective Anastasia Brown for Comic Art magazine. The same year Alessandrini was awarded the best artist prize by ANAF.

Alessandrini first solo effort was published in 1992 on Comic Art: it's a series of short stories titled Fatti e misfatti a Planet Arium. He then drew the Martin Mystére spin-off series Zona X.

In 1993 Alessandrini produced three episodes of Indiana Jones for Bagheera. In 2001 he drew Outremer, written by Vincenzo Beretta for French publisher Albin-Michel.

"Alessandrini plays an important role in the evolution of comics art of the last 15 years." said Alfredo Castelli. "He may not realize it, but at the beginning of the 1980s his style has been the trait-d'union between Italian pulp comics and graphic novels, and in the 1990s, he is the only exception in a 'school' that has been dominant for the last 8-10 years."
