= Lino Landolfi =

Italian cartoonist (1925–1988)

Lino Landolfi (6 April 1925 – 11 February 1988) was an Italian cartoonist.

Born in Rome, Landolfi attended various art schools including the Accademia where he studied painting, sculpture, decorating and scenery. He debuted as a cartoonist in 1947 with the character of "Joe", published by Corriere dei Piccoli. In 1951 he created his most popular character, Procopio, realized for the magazine Il Vittorioso until 1968. In 1968, he changed his usual graphic style for a critically appreciated grotesque-realistic version of Don Quixote published by Vitt.

In 1969 he started a collaboration with the children magazine Il Giornalino, for which Landolfi, in addition to having made several comic adaptations from literary such as Gulliver's Travels and Father Brown, co-created with writer Claudio Nizzi the popular "Piccolo Dente", leading character of a long lasting eponym comic strip.
