= Gianni De Luca =

Italian artist (1927–1991)

A panel from Hamlet.

Gianni De Luca (born Fortunato De Luca (27 [25] January 1927 – 6 June 1991) was an Italian comic book artist, illustrator, painter and etcher.

== Biography ==
De Luca was born at Gagliato and moved to Rome when he was 6 years old. He attended Architecture; however, he soon moved to comics and started his career as comics artists in 1946 for the magazine Il Vittorioso with Anac the Destroyer, followed in 1947 by the Da Vinci Wizard (Leonardo da Vinci), and then The Empire of the Sun and the Last Days of the Earth.

In the late 1950s he started to collaborate with the Edizioni Paoline, a Catholic publisher, and with their weekly magazine Il Giornalino. In 1957–1959 he worked at La più grande storia mai raccontata ("The Greatest Story Ever Told"), a series of tales based on the Bible, and I dodici in cammino (a history of the Christian Church).

In 1969 he drew a western, Bob Jason, and started his most famous creation, Commissario Spada, a series featuring a commissioner of the criminal police of Milan, characterized by an unusual (for Italian comics) attention to realistic details, written by Gianluigi Gonano. For the series De Luca introduced a number of graphical innovations, which he later used also for the comics version of three Shakespeare's masterworks, Hamlet, The Tempest and Romeo and Juliet, written by Raoul Traverso. De Luca won a Yellow Kid Award for Commissario Spada in 1971.

After the end of the Commissario Spada series in 1982, De Luca continued to work for Il Giornalino with the comics version of Il giornalino di Gian Burrasca, adapted by Claudio Nizzi, then to the Adventure on the Orinoco, written by Roberto Del Prà, and comics biographies of Totò and Marilyn Monroe. These were followed by the science fiction series Paulus, with stories by Tommaso Mastandrea, depicting a historian living in a future dictatorship who, using a time machine, reproduces the life of St. Paul. In 1988 he worked to the adaptation of a historical novel, La freccia nera, followed by I giorni dell'impero ("The Days of the Empire"), set in Imperial Rome and left unfinished after De Luca's death at Rome in 1991.
