= Gli Aristocratici =

- Genre: giallo-comedy

Creative team
- Written by: Alfredo Castelli
- Artist(s): Ferdinando Tacconi

Gli Aristocratici ("The Aristocrats") is an Italian comic strip series created in 1973 by Alfredo Castelli and Ferdinando Tacconi.

== Background ==
The comics was first published in 1973 by the comics magazine Il Corriere dei Ragazzi. It features a group of gentlemen thieves who donate to charity the money of their thefts. During their stories they also encountered famous literary and cinematographic characters such as Sherlock Holmes, James Bond or Inspector Clouseau.

The series obtained a moderate success in Italy and was translated in 18 foreign countries. In 1983 it generated a spin-off, Agente Allen, published by Il Giornalino. Gli Aristocratici also appeared, as supporting characters, in a number of stories of Martin Mystère.

== Characters ==
The main characters in the comic are:

- The Earl, a British gentleman and also the leader of the group,
- Moose, an Irish strongman,
- Alvaro, an Italian charmer and also a master of safes,
- Fritz, a German inventor,
- Jean, the Earl's adopted daughter
- Michael Allen, who works at Scotland Yard, and who sometimes tries to catch the Aristocrats and who sometimes needs their help. He is in love with Jean.
