= Larry Yuma =

Italian comics character

- Genre: Western

Larry Yuma is the title character of an Italian western comics series created by Carlo Boscarato and Claudio Nizzi.

It was published in the comics magazine Il Giornalino from 1971 to 1992 for a total of 164 episodes.

The comic is strongly influenced by the Italian Spaghetti Western cinema.
