= Bernadette Després =

French illustrator and comic book artist (1941–2024)

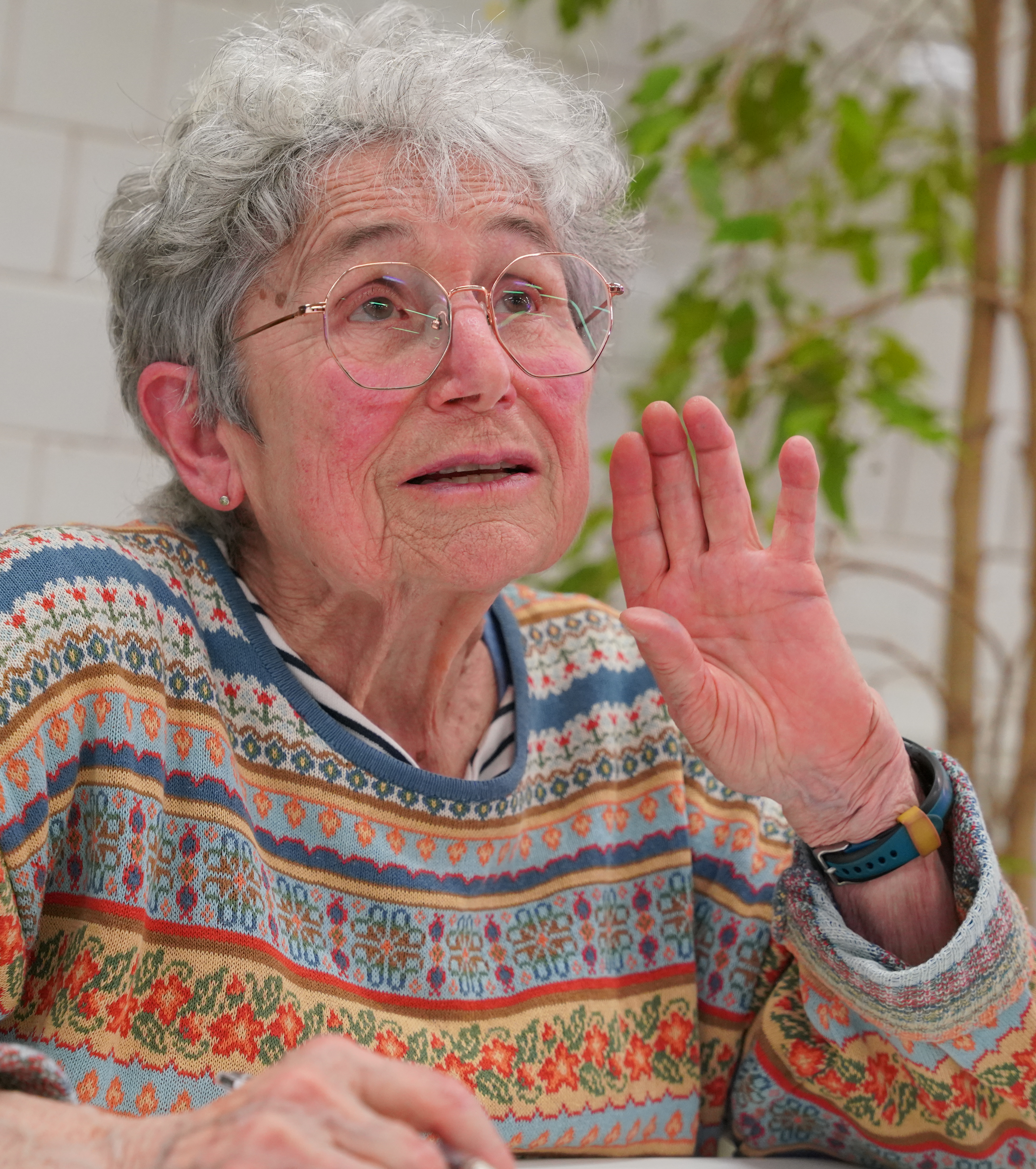
- Després in 2024
- Born: 28 March 1941; Paris, German-occupied France
- Died: 19 November 2024 (aged 83); Orléans, France
- Known for: Comic books

Bernadette Després (28 March 1941 – 19 November 2024) was a French illustrator and comic book artist.

== Life and career ==
Després was born in Paris on 28 March 1941. She studied at the Ecole de l'Union Centrale des Arts Décoratifs there. Després began working as an illustrator at Bayard Presse, where she worked on the magazines Pomme d'Api and Okapi. In 1977, she introduced Tom-Tom and Nana, probably the most popular French comics series for young people, in the magazine J'aime lire; the series has also been adapted for television.

In 1990, she was awarded the Prix RTL. In 1993, she received the Prix Bernard Versele from La ligue des Familles de Belgique. In 1999, she received the Prix Jeunesse du festival d'Angoulême for Dégâts à gogo. In 2001, Tom-Tom and Nana received the Prix spécial du public jeunesse at the Le Festival de la bande dessinée de Darnétal. In 2002, she was awarded the Grand prix de l'Humour Tendre at the Salon international du dessin de presse et d'humour de Saint-Just-le-Martel for Radio casserole et les premiers de la casse.

Després died on 19 November 2024, at the age of 83.
