= Gargantua e Pantagruel =

1979 comic book by Dino Battaglia

- Page count: 128 pages

Creative team
- Writer: Dino Battaglia, after François Rabelais
- Artist: Dino Battaglia
- Colourist: Laura De Vescovi

Original publication
- Published in: Il Giornalino
- Date of publication: 1979
- Language: Italian

Gargantua e Pantagruel is a 1979 Italian comic book by Dino Battaglia. It is based on Gargantua and Pantagruel, two French Renaissance novels by François Rabelais. It was first published in the Catholic comics magazine Il Giornalino.

Battaglia was already known for adapting literary classics into comics before he made Gargantua e Pantagruel. He wrote and drew the comic, and his wife Laura De Vescovi was the colourist.

In 2014, ActuaBD called Gargantua e Pantagruel "a rich, complex and splendid work". When it was republished in Italian by Edizioni NPE in 2021, Lo Spazio Bianco wrote that Battaglia made Gargantua e Pantagruel at the peak of his ability and picked the most dynamic parts of the original novels, which mock ideologies and the stupidity of the masses, resulting in a colourful work full of joy.
