= Pulsar (disambiguation) =

A pulsar is a type of star.

Pulsar may also refer to:

== Arts and entertainment ==
- Pulsar (band), a French progressive rock band
- Pulsar (comics), several uses
- Pulsar (film), a 2010 Belgian film
- Pulsar (video game), a 1981 arcade game
- The Pulsars, an American new wave/indie rock band

== Businesses and products ==
- Pulsar (synthesizer), a music synthesizer by Creamware
- Pulsar (social listening platform), an audience intelligence platform
- Pulsar (watch), a brand of watch and a division of Seiko Watch Corporation
- Pulsar Games, a defunct game company
- IBM RS64-III or Pulsar, a 1990s IBM microprocessor
- Pulsar Fusion, a UK-based startup in nuclear fusion space propulsion
- Pulsar, operator of the Réseau express métropolitain light metro

== Transportation ==
- Aero Designs Pulsar, an American ultralight aircraft
- Bajaj Pulsar, an Indian motorcycle
- Nissan Pulsar, a Japanese small car
- Wright Pulsar, a British single-decker bus body

== Other uses ==
- Pulsar (grape), another name for the French wine grape Poulsard
- Pulsar (roller coaster), at Walibi Belgium
- Pulsar, an Apache Software Foundation project

== See also ==
- Pulstar (disambiguation)
