= Ferdinando Tacconi =

Italian comics artist

Ferdinando Tacconi (December 27, 1922 – May 11, 2006) was an Italian comics artist.

Tacconi was born in Milan. He earned a degree in Applied Arts from Castello Sforzesco. After collaborating as an illustrator to the magazines Grazia and Confidenze, Tacconi entered the comics field after World War II, debuting with the comic series Sciuscià and later working on a number of comics in Italy, France, and the United Kingdom. For Junior Express, he worked on Journey into Space and Jeff Hawke.

His main works included Gli Aristocratici, which he co-created with Alfredo Castelli, L'uomo del Deserto, L'uomo di Rangoon, Dylan Dog and Nick Raider. He often worked for Il Giornalino where he co-created with Gino D'Antonio the series Susanna and Uomini senza gloria.

Tacconi died in Milan after a long period of poor health. He was 83.
