= Pulstar =

Pulstar may refer to:

- Pulstar (video game), a 1995 horizontal-scrolling shooter arcade game
- PULSTAR, a nuclear reactor at North Carolina State University
- "Pulstar", a song by Vangelis from the 1976 album Albedo 0.39
  - "Pulstar", a 1983 cover, the biggest hit of Italo-disco band Hipnosis

== See also ==
- Pulsar (disambiguation)
