= Procopio (comics) =

- Genre: Humor/comedy

Creative team
- Created by: Lino Landolfi

Procopio is the title character of an eponymous Italian comic strip series created by Lino Landolfi.

The comic started in 1951 in the comics magazine Il Vittorioso, where it was published until the magazine's closure in the late sixties.

Procopio debuted as a squire of a medieval knight. The author then turned him into a multi-faceted character who played many different roles, using the trick of a contemporary Procopio who at the start of every episode recounts the adventures of his ancestors (all called Procopio and all with the same characteristics and traits).

In a 1958, in an Italian survey carried by RAI TV, Procopio resulted as the most popular character of the children's literature and comics.

In 1966, Procopio was protagonist of a series of vinyl records titled Le fiabe di mago Procopio; the same year he was subject of a novel, Procopio di Terracupa, written by the same Landolfi.

Procopio also appeared in a short-living series of B&W animated shorts.
