= Commissario Spada =

Panel showing Commissario Spada and, on the right, his son Mario.

The Commissario Spada was an Italian comics series published on the Catholic weekly magazine Il Giornalino from 1970 to 1982, created by Gianluigi Gonano and Gianni De Luca. Featuring the adventures of a widower commissioner working in the criminal police of Milan, and his son Mario, it is one of the earliest examples of realistic themes in Italian comics. De Luca won the Yellow Kid Award for his drawings for the first year, the character being defined by the jury "very modern character for graphical creation, language and content".
