= L'Omino Bufo =

Italian comic strip

- Genre: Humor/comedy

Creative team
- Created by: Alfredo Castelli

L'Omino Bufo is an Italian comic strip created by Alfredo Castelli.

== Background ==
The comics started in 1972 and it was first published by the comics magazine Il Corriere dei Ragazzi. According his author, it was created to "fill a space in the magazine that had been left empty for a technical error". It is the only comics in which Castelli is also artist, with the pseudonym "pittore di santini". After that the Corriere dei Ragazzi (later Corriere Dei Piccoli) ceased its publications, the comic strip was published in Cattivik.
