= Carlo Boscarato =

Italian cartoonist and comics artist

Carlo Boscarato (May 9, 1926 – June 12, 1987) was an Italian cartoonist and comics artist. He was born in Treviso.

In 1971, together with writer Claudio Nizzi, Boscarato created the western series Larry Yuma. He also realized several reductions of literary masterworks such as The Treasure Island.
