= Nicoletta (comics) =

Title character of an Italian humorous comic strip series

Publication information
- Genre: Humor/comedy
- Publication date: 1981–present

Nicoletta is the title character of an Italian humorous comic strip series, created in 1981, and published weekly in the comics magazine Il Giornalino.

== Background ==
The comic series was created by Claudio Nizzi as writer and by Claudio Onesti (under the pen name "Clod") as artist. It debuted on the 41st issue of the magazine Il Giornalino in October 1981. Paola Ferrarini (under the pen name "Lina") replaced Nizzi after a few episodes.

The series tells the ordinary life of the teenager Nicoletta Marchini, struggling with the typical problems of her age. It had a large success, especially with the female audience.
