= Conchy =

American comic strip by James Childress

- James Childress' Conchy (1974)
- Author(s): James Childress
- Current status/schedule: Daily and Sunday; concluded
- Launch date: March 2, 1970
- End date: February 5, 1977 (daily); March 13, 1977 (Sunday)
- Syndicate(s): Self-syndicated (1970-74, 1976-77); Field Enterprise (1974-76)
- Genre(s): humor, adults

Conchy was an American comic strip that ran from March 2, 1970 to February 5, 1977 (daily) and March 13, 1977 (Sunday). Set on a desert island with a group of beachcombers as the main characters, the strip addressed serious issues of its time.

== Publication history ==
James Childress (April 13, 1941 – January 22, 1977) created Conchy in the early 1960s as an homage to his love of beachcombing. By 1962, Childress was pitching the strip to syndicates with no results. Eventually, he started marketing it directly to newspapers under the business name Corinthian Features. Through this, Conchy began its newspaper run on March 2, 1970.

By 1974, Conchy was appearing in 26 papers, finally attracting a syndicate's interest, from Field Newspaper Syndicate, who signed Childress up that year. His client list increased to over 150 papers.

During this time, Tempo Books published three collections of Conchy dailies: Conchy, Man of the Now; Conchy on the Half-Shell (abridged from the first book, with new material added); and Conchy, Living in Tomorrow's Past. Brant Parker, creator of The Wizard of Id, provided a foreword to Childress's first book, calling him a born cartoonist: "This book is just another step on his way to the top."

Field Enterprises wanted Childress to content himself with simpler gags rather than his frequent serious musings. When Childress refused, Field Enterprises severed its partnership with him in 1976, and Childress returned to self-syndication. Despite an initial dip immediately after this, Conchy's newspaper circulation soon reached an all-time high, achieving modest commercial success.

Facing family and financial difficulties in addition to a custody battle with his ex-wife, Childress committed suicide in 1977. The daily run ended on February 5, 1977, and the last Sunday strip was published March 13, 1977. (Sunday)

== Story and characters ==
Conchy consisted of both typical gag strips and strips about serious subjects like nuclear proliferation, political corruption and death. These ruminations were usually courtesy of either Conchy or Oom Paul, as both characters were highly individual thinkers.

- Conchy — Pronounced "konk-ee" (referring to conchs) - an Everyman beachcomber
- Oom Paul — A pipe-smoking, somewhat cynical individual who self-assuredly assumes the position as mentor to the small island clan
- Bug — A rugged-looking but gentle individual who enjoys life to the fullest simply because he never gives much serious thought to anything
- Patch and Duff — A pair of twin troublemakers who live in a cave
- Sea urchin — Philosopher of the tide pools, thoughtful but quiet
- The islanders — The original residents of Conchy's island, the islanders co-exist peacefully with the beachcombers, but they are constantly plagued with a never-ending hot- and cold-running war with the inhabitants of the neighboring East Island
- The king — The ruler of Conchy's island and cousin to the king in The Wizard of Id

== Analysis ==
Mark Evanier and Sergio Aragonés are among comics professionals who feel Conchy deserves wider attention today. Evanier wrote in his blog on December 29, 2005, "I'd like to see someone do a big book that collected the entirety of Conchy, a short-lived but wonderful newspaper strip." The next day he noted that Aragonés concurred.

== Bibliography ==
- Planet Peschel: Conchy
- Toonopedia: Conchy
- Drawgerpedia: Conchy
