= Pulsar (comics) =

Pulsar, in comics, may refer to:

- Pulsar (Marvel Comics), a member of the Shi'ar Imperial Guard
- Pulsar (Plor), a member of the Spaceknights
- Pulsar, a codename of superhero Monica Rambeau
- Pulsar Stargrave, a DC Comics villain

== See also ==
- Pulsar (disambiguation)
