= Paolo Sala =

Italian painter (1859–1924)

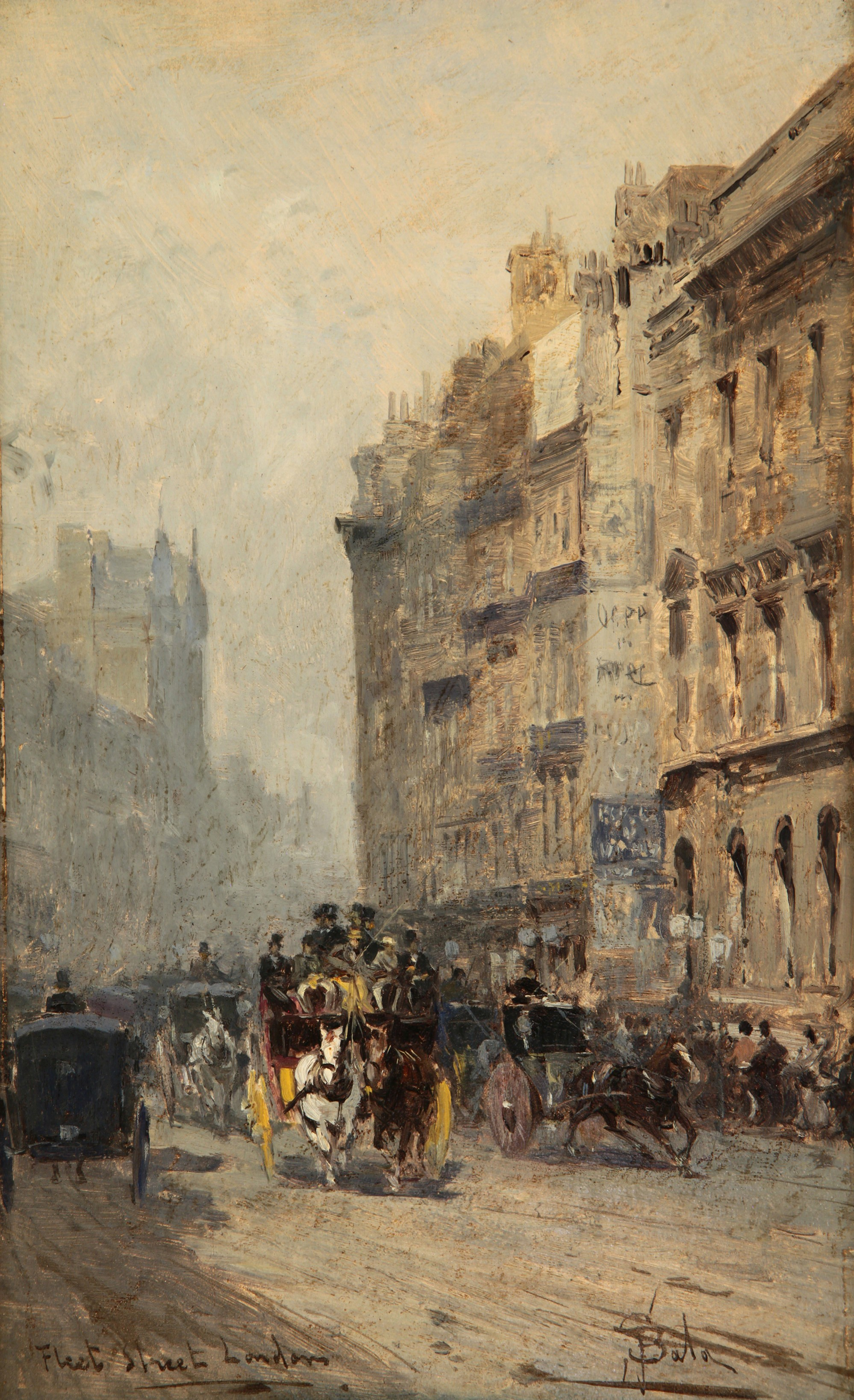
Street in London

Paolo Sala (January 24, 1859 – 1924) was an Italian painter, mainly of vedute and genre scenes. He often painted dal vero, that is, en plein air. He was also known for his ability to paint animals in rural scenes. He founded the Lombard association of watercolor painters in 1911.

== Life and works ==
Born in Lombardy, he was resident in Milan. he trained with Camillo Boito. In 1880, he exhibited in Naples a canvas representing, Interior of the Duomo of Milan. In the next year, in Milan, he exhibited a series of canvases: Return to the Mountains; Arrivo del vapore; Rezzonico; Il frate; Under the Portico; Risi e Sorrisi. Among his genre paintings are: Passeggiata militare; Torrente in Valtellina. In 1883, he exhibited in Milan: Dopo le Gallerie; Impressione dal vero; Remembrance of Winter; Una frana; Canal Grande of Venice; Il turbine; Nel parco. In addition, he displayed the three watercolors: In Val di Gonna; In Val d'Esino; Da Rogoredo. In Rome, in 1883, he exhibited: Surroundings of Varese; Outside of Varese; Cortile rustico near Milan; Ricordo di Venice; and Near the Door.

Among his works are: Sorrisi d' Estate; Peace of the Mountains; The Shore; Ritorno alla pianura (watercolor), and Le sponde del Ticino. In 1886, in Milan, he exhibited: Hyde Park; Westminster Abbey; Oxford Street; Broad Sanctuary-Westminster; Fleet Street; On the Mersey Liverpool; Trafalgar Square. At the 1887 National Artistic Exhibition of Venice, he displayed Blessed Age; Tragic Poet; Dogs; two paintings of Street of London; Riviere di Verona. Sala had an individual exhibition in December 1922 in Galleria Pesaro of Milan.
