= Petra Chérie =

Italian comic series by Attilio Micheluzzi

Creative team
- Created by: Attilio Micheluzzi

Petra Chérie is an Italian comic series created by Attilio Micheluzzi.

== Background ==
The comics started in 1977 and it was first published by the weekly magazine Il Giornalino. It features the adventures of Petra de Karlowitz, best known as Petra Chérie, a twenty-year-old Franco-Polish noblewoman who, after living five years in China, moves to Sluis, The Netherlands, where she faces the First World War as well as the cultural prejudices against adventurous and independent women. From January 1982 the comics were published by the monthly magazine Alter Alter. During the years several anthological books were also published.
