= Tom-Tom and Nana =

French comic strip

Tom-Tom and Nana is a French comic strip series published in the monthly magazine J'aime lire since 1977. The first authors of the series were writer Jacqueline Cohen and artist Bernadette Després. They were joined by author Evelyne Reberg, and in the most recent editions, by artist Marylise Morel. The comic book has gained success which reached a peak around 1995-2000 (during which time a TV cartoon was created). During the 2000s its publication was less regular. An English translation entitled Tom and Lili is published in the magazine AdventureBox.

== Synopsis ==
The cartoon covers the Dubouchon family, proprietors of the restaurant The Good Fork, which is often turned upside-down by the mischief of the two youngest children, Tom-Tom and Nana.

== Characters ==
=== The Dubouchons ===
- Tom-Tom Dubouchon is a dunce who is tired by the excesses of Nana. Most of the time, he is responsible for the mischief that takes place. He's about nine years old. He is very short-tempered, prone to jealousy, and vain, yet he often proves himself capable of a certain kindness.
- Nana Dubouchon is the youngest of the family. She is six years old. She takes part of Tom-Tom's stupidities, and she admires him as much as she admires her sister Marie-Lou. She's a little crazy, but is also capable of kindness.
- Adrien Dubouchon is the father and the chef of the restaurant. He is often grumpy. He is a well known cook, whose Chouquette Royale is very famous.
- Yvonne Dubouchon is the mother, who lacks some authority.
- Marie-Lou Dubouchon is the eldest child. She is in love with Mémed and she is incensed by her brother and sister.
- Roberta Dubouchon is Adrien's sister. She has a canary and she is passionate about housework and homework. The Dubouchon Family always tries to avoid her but in vain.

=== Employees and customers of the restaurant ===
- Mélanie Lano is a kitchen assistant. She has a relationship with Gino.
- Gino Marto is an Italian waiter. He is very chic and he has a very boisterous mother called "Mama Marto". He loves Tom-Tom and Nana, but is tired of their stupidities.
- Mr. Henry is an old regular customer. He is very calm and serene during the meal, although eccentric.
- Mrs. Poipoi is a regular customer and is usually accompanied by Mr. Henry.
- Mr. Robert is another regular customer who eats dinner with Mr Henry and Mrs. Poipoi.
- Mrs. Kellmer, is a customer who likes clairvoyance, magic and animals. The Dubouchon's parents try to avoid her, but the children love her. She has a big dog called Pupuce, source of many problems.
- Mr. Rechigno, is a customer. When he becomes rich, he deserts the restaurant to go to the Homard Gracieux, a chic-er establishment. In spite of his terrible personality, the Dubouchon Family does everything possible to recover him, in vain.
- Mrs. Mochu is a haughty customer and particularly ugly despite the care she takes over her appearance.
- Mr. Lachaise is a customer and also a substitute teacher of Mr. Tabouret, who doesn't like Tom-Tom.

=== Other ===
- Remi Lepoivre, Tom-Tom's best friend, is a part of a sporty family. He's almost as unruly as the Dubouchon children.
- Sophie Moulinet is Tom-Tom's friend who he's often fighting with.
- Fatiah, Nana's friend, is very girly.
- Mr. Albert Tabouret, Tom-Tom's teacher, is a stickler for orthography and calculus; he can be really strong with his pupils, but never unfair.
- Arthur, A spoiled child whose parents give in to his every whim.

== Running gags ==
- Father's and Mother's Days, almost each year, Mother's day – and less regularly, Father's Day – is spoiled by a last minute event, and the whole story is about Tom-Tom and Nana trying to save the day.
- Arthur: he is spoiled by money; his parents allow everything he asks. Each time he comes to the restaurant, he fights with the Dubouchon children who try to calm him down.
- Aunt Roberte: Holds very strong views about cleaning and dedicates the rest of her time to her lovely nephews.
- Mrs. Kelmer: Her dog, is big and embarrassing, but also very lovely.

== Animated series ==
Tom-Tom et Nana was adapted to a 52 episode animated series in 1997. It was broadcast by France 3 and Canal J, and produced by Bayard Presse, Valentine Productions and Jufox

Another 52 episode animated adaptation is currently produced by Bayard Jeunesse and 4.21 Productions and debuted on Télétoon+ in 2019.
