= Dino Battaglia =

Italian comic artist

- Born: 1 August 1923 Venice, Kingdom of Italy
- Died: 4 October 1983 (aged 60) Milan, Italy
- Area: Comics artist
- Notable works: Mark Fury; Till Eulenspiegel; L'Ispettore Coke
- Awards: Full list

Dino Battaglia (1 August 1923 – 4 October 1983) was an Italian comics artist, noted for a distinctive and expressive style, best known for his visual adaptations of classic novels.

In 1946 Dino Battaglia became part of the so-called Group of Venice with Fernando Carcupino, Hugo Pratt and Damiano Damiani.

== Biography ==
Born in Venice, Italy, Battaglia first entered the comic book profession in 1946 co-founding and producing work for the Italian magazine Asso di Picche, where he drew some pages of the Junglemen series. Here he worked with other Venetian artists, among them Hugo Pratt and Alberto Ongaro. When Asso di Picche folded in 1948, the Venetian Group (as they became known) moved to Argentina to work for Italian publisher Cesar Civita. Battaglia remained behind in Italy, opting for marriage instead of joining the Argentine move, but he drew the pirate strip Capitan Caribe, written by Ongaro and published in Héctor Germán Oesterheld's magazine Frontera, and other strips such as Cowboy Kid for Salgari.

In 1950 Battaglia moved to Milan, where he worked for Mondadori's Pecos Bill and for Il Vittorioso. Between 1952 and 1953 he created Mark Fury, a pugilistic strip set in Edwardian England for Intrepido. The series was translated and republished in Junior Express between 1955–56, introducing Battaglia to the British market. In 1959 he started a collaboration with English publisher Fleetway through Milan-based Roy D'Ami studio, producing several short stories for Top Spot, Knockout, Thriller Picture Library and Look and Learn.

Starting in 1960 Battaglia produced a series of adaptations of fairy tales and classic novels for Il Corriere dei Piccoli and Il Corriere dei Ragazzi. In 1965 he drew I Cinque della Selena, a science fiction series written by Mino Milani.

In 1967 the magazine Sgt. Kirk published an adaptation of Moby Dick, a work that marked Battaglia's artistic maturity: his drawings achieved the unique, distinctive style that characterised all his later productions. From then on, Battaglia focused on adaptations rather than on original series: he was particularly interested in classic novelists such as Poe, H. P. Lovecraft, Stevenson, Maupassant and E. T. A. Hoffmann. He illustrated several of these writers' gothic short stories for Linus magazine, earning the title of Master of Darkness.

During the 1970s Battaglia produced a series of religious works for Il Messaggero dei Ragazzi and Il Giornalino, including the biographies of Antonio da Padova and Frate Francesco, as well as adaptation of classic satires such as Till Eulenspiegel (1975), about the folk hero, and Gargantua e Pantagruel (1979), after Rabelais' Gargantua and Pantagruel. In the late 1970s he began working for publisher Bonelli, producing L’Uomo della Legione and L'Uomo del New England for the series Un uomo un'avventura.

In 1982 he created his only original series, L'Ispettore Coke (Inspector Coke) for the publisher Isola Trovata, featuring a detective of Scotland Yard who faces strange cases in stories set at the beginning of the 20th century. Two album publications, I delitti della fenice (The Crimes of the Phoenix) and La Mummia (The Mummy) were completed before the work was interrupted by Battaglia's unexpected death in 1983. The third album publication Il Monstro del Tamigi (The Monster of the Thames) was subsequently completed by Bepi Vigna (story) and Corrado Roi (artwork) and published in Italy by Lo Scarabeo in September of 2019.

Since 1950, Battaglia's wife Laura De Vescovi collaborated on writing the scenarios and as colourist on his stories. Several comics critics have written theses on Battaglia, and his original artworks have been the subject of many expositions. Because of his preference for adaptations, Battaglia has never reached the notoriety of some of his contemporaries, but the expressive skill of Battaglia have earned him the respect of comics connoisseurs and his works are reprinted still today.

== Awards ==
1975: Angoulême Festival, France, Award for best foreign artist

== See also ==
- Italian comics

== Sources ==
- Dino Battaglia dossier FFF (in Italian)
- Dino Battaglia publications Editions Mosquito (in French)
- Dino Battaglia publications in Pilote BDoubliées (in French)
