= Attilio Micheluzzi =

Italian comics artist (1930–1990)

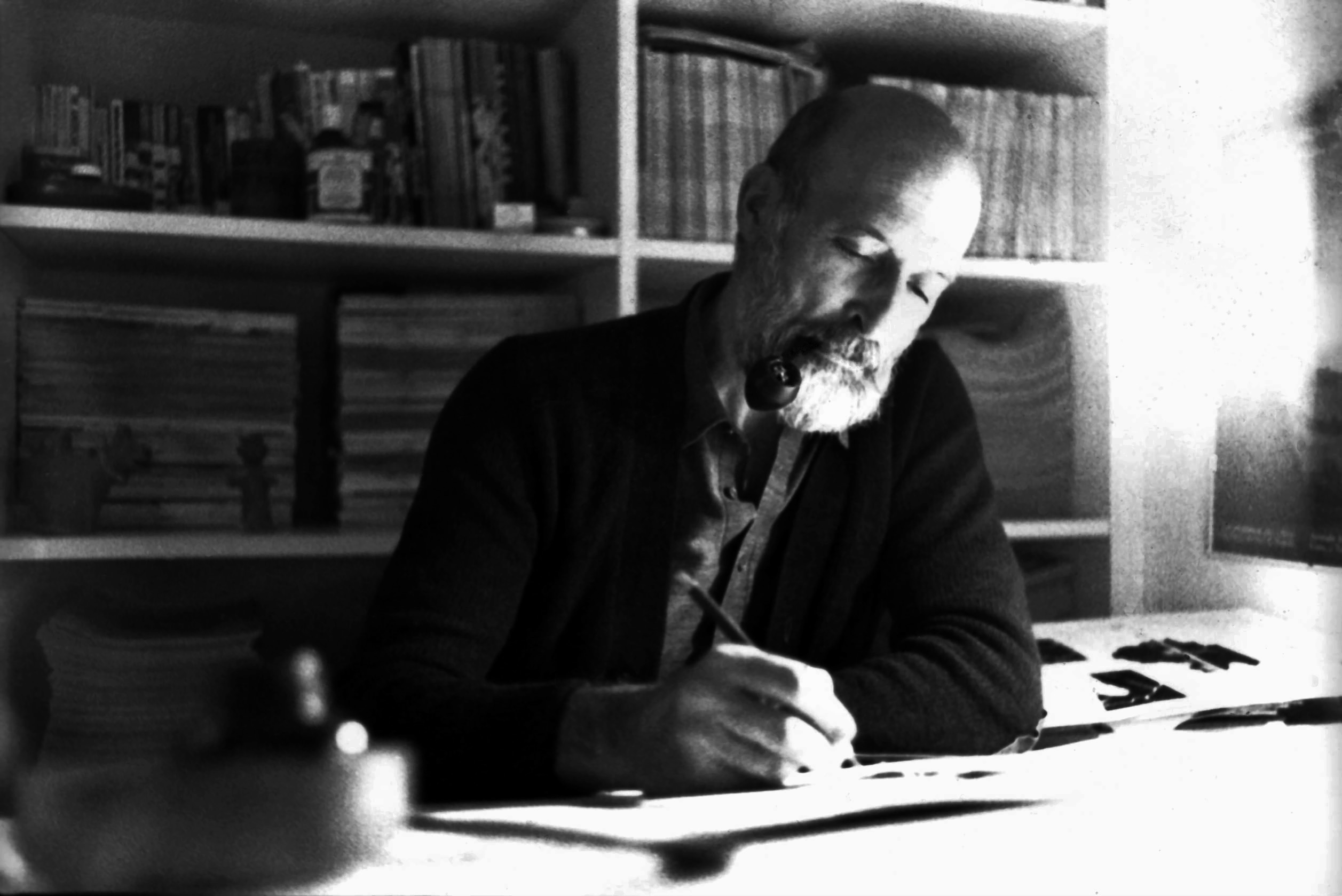
Attilio Micheluzzi in his studio in Naples, 1985.

Attilio Micheluzzi, also known by the pseudonym of Igor Artz Bajeff (Umag, August 11, 1930 – Naples, September 20, 1990), was an Italian comic book artist recognized as a master and an important figure in the history of Italian comics. Despite starting his career at a relatively late age, over the course of twenty years, he created numerous comic book stories such as Johnny Focus, Petra Chérie, Marcel Labrume, Rosso Stenton, Air Mail, Bab-el-Mandeb, Roy Mann, Siberia, Titanic, and Afghanistan. These works were published in well-known Italian auteur comic magazines, including Il Giornalino, Corriere dei ragazzi, alter alter, Orient Express, Comic Art, L'Eternauta, Corto Maltese, and the series Un uomo un'avventura.

== Biography ==
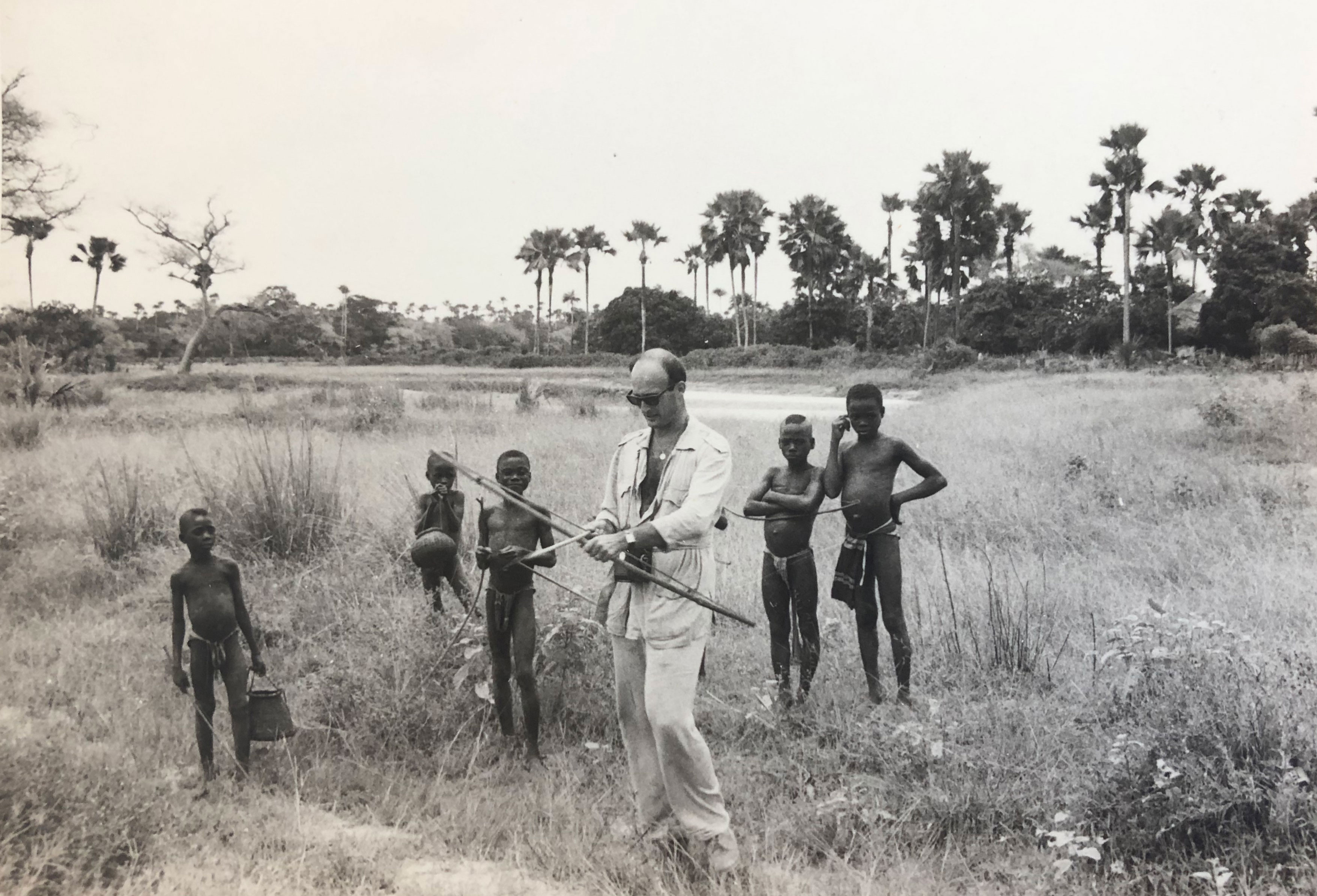
Attilio Micheluzzi in Senegal, 1965

In 1961, Micheluzzi earned a degree in architecture from the University of Naples. Shortly after graduating, he moved to Africa, where he worked in Senegal, Nigeria, Gambia, Tunisia, and Libya. In 1969, just before assuming the position of Architect of the Royal Household in Libya, he was forced to return to Naples following the coup d'état that brought Muammar Gaddafi to power.

== Career in the 1970s ==
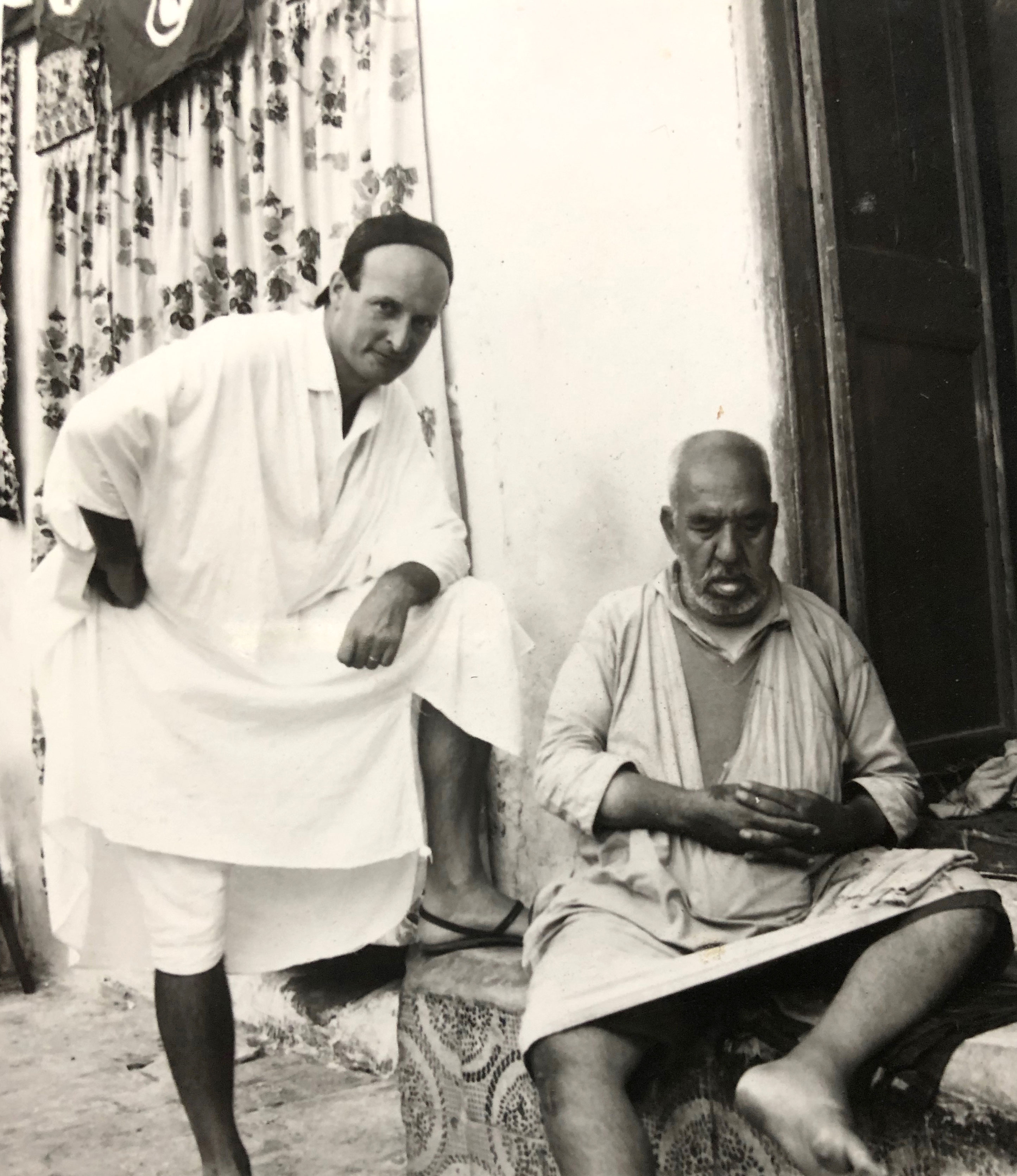
Attilio Micheluzzi in Sousse, Tunisia, 1966

At the age of forty-two, faced with difficulties in continuing his architectural career in Italy, Attilio Micheluzzi decided to radically change profession and began working as a comic book artist. In 1972, he wrote and illustrated a short story, which he submitted to the Milan-based magazine Corriere dei Ragazzi. This marked the beginning of his collaboration with the magazine.

Micheluzzi debuted with a story for the series Dal nostro inviato nel tempo (From Our Correspondent in Time) by Mino Milani, titled Il pilota che morì due volte (The Pilot Who Died Twice), based on a script by Milani himself. Initially, he signed his work with the pseudonym Igor Artz Bajeff, out of a sense of modesty, but he soon abandoned it in favor of his real name. He went on to create other stories for the series, including La tragedia del Titanic (The Tragedy of the Titanic), and contributed to other series, occasionally writing the scripts himself.

In 1974, Micheluzzi created his first serialized character, Johnny Focus, producing nearly twenty stories published in Corriere dei Ragazzi until 1976, when he ended his collaboration with the magazine. During this time, he also illustrated comics covering a variety of subjects, ranging from war stories to biographies of historical figures.

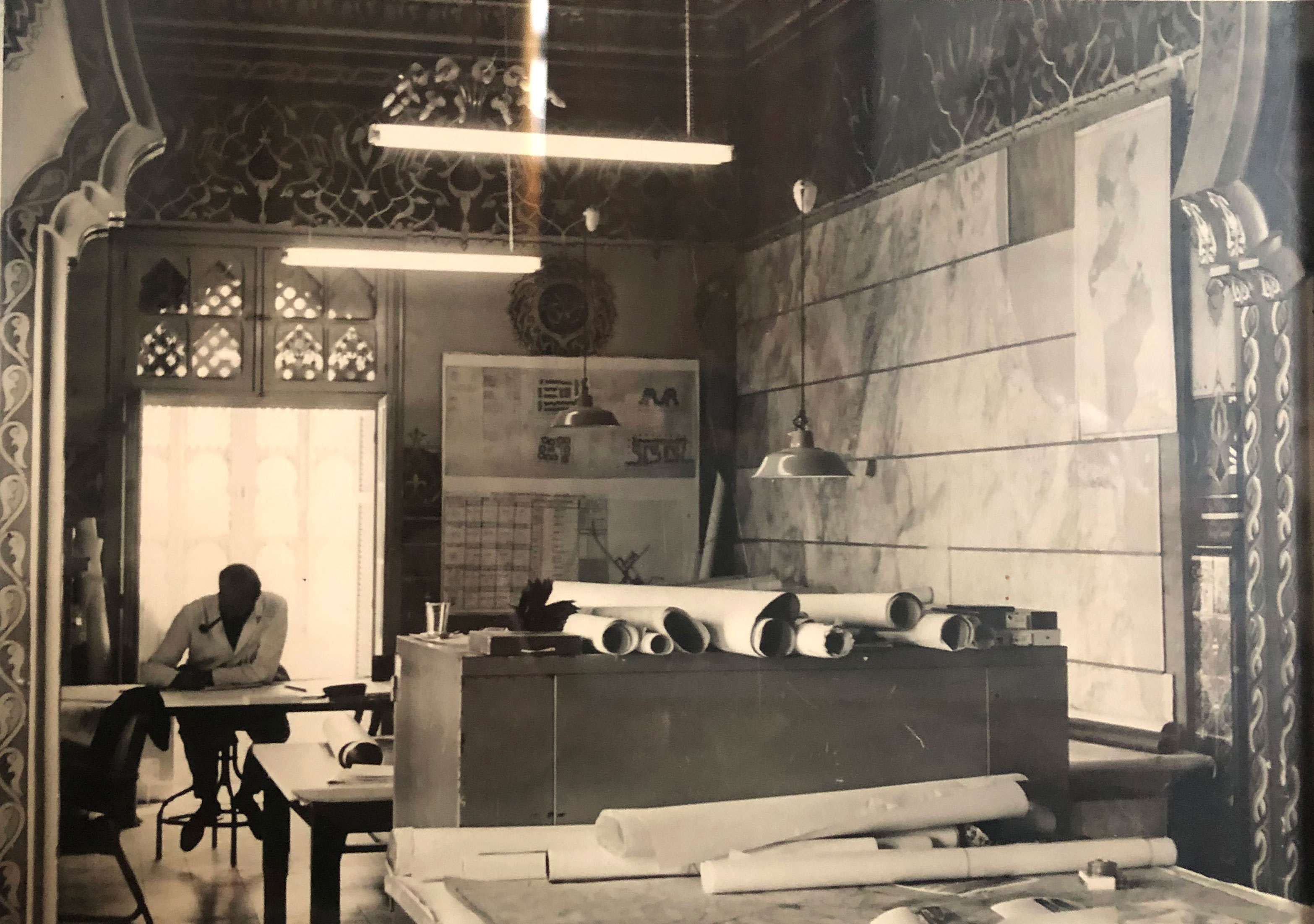
Attilio Micheluzzi in his architecture studio in Sousse, Tunisia, 1966

In 1976, Micheluzzi began working for Il Giornalino, illustrating the adventures of Capitan Erik, a character created by Claudio Nizzi and previously drawn by Ruggero Giovannini. He also produced numerous other stories for the magazine, including biographical comics about notable historical figures such as Martin Luther King, Gandhi, and Salvo D'Acquisto, as well as illustrations for the magazine's columns.

In 1977, he created the character Petra chérie. During the same period, he developed the series Simon Flash for the magazine Skorpio published by Eura Editoriale, and collaborated with Mondadori's SuperGulp! magazine, where in 1978 he published the series Parallelo 5 (Parallel 5). His work caught the attention of publisher Sergio Bonelli, who invited him to contribute to the series Un uomo un'avventura (One Man, One Adventure). Micheluzzi created two albums for the series: L'uomo del Tanganyka (The Man of Tanganyika) (1978) and L'uomo del Khyber (The Man of Khyber)(1980), both of which were later republished in the collection I grandi del fumetto (The Greats of Comics).

== Career in the 1980s ==
The 1980s marked a significant phase in Attilio Micheluzzi's career as he began collaborating with the renowned magazine alter alter, which targeted a more adult audience compared to his previous works. In 1980, he illustrated Marcel Labrume for the magazine, and two years later, he contributed four new episodes of Petra chérie. During this period, he also adapted I Promessi Sposi (The Betrothed) for Il Giornalino and created a comic biography of Anne Frank for Messaggero dei Ragazzi.

In 1982, Micheluzzi resumed illustrating the adventures of his first serialized character, Johnny Focus, in the newly launched magazine Orient Express. That same year, for the magazine Più, he collaborated with Mino Milani to create the female character Molly Manderling. He also began working with L'Eternauta, where in issue no. 10 (December 1982), the character Rosso Stenton made its debut.

The following year, in 1983, Micheluzzi created Air Mail for Orient Express. Further adventures of this character were published in the magazine Giungla by Nerbini and in L'Eternauta. His work received international acclaim, and in 1984, he was awarded the prestigious Prix Alfred at the Angoulême International Comics Festival in France. That same year, he published Jesus Detective San in Full, a magazine by Sergio Bonelli Editore. In 1985, he released Fiasco a Beda Littoria in the first issue of European Cartoonist Magazine.

In 1986, Micheluzzi created the long story Bab-el-Mandeb for the magazine Corto Maltese. Later that year, the first episode of Jean Mermoz was published in issue no. 11 of Corto Maltese; the story was later completed in a volume by Rizzoli Lizard. In 1987, for the magazine Comic Art, Micheluzzi introduced another new character, Roy Mann, based on scripts by Tiziano Sclavi. The third adventure of this character was published posthumously in 1991.

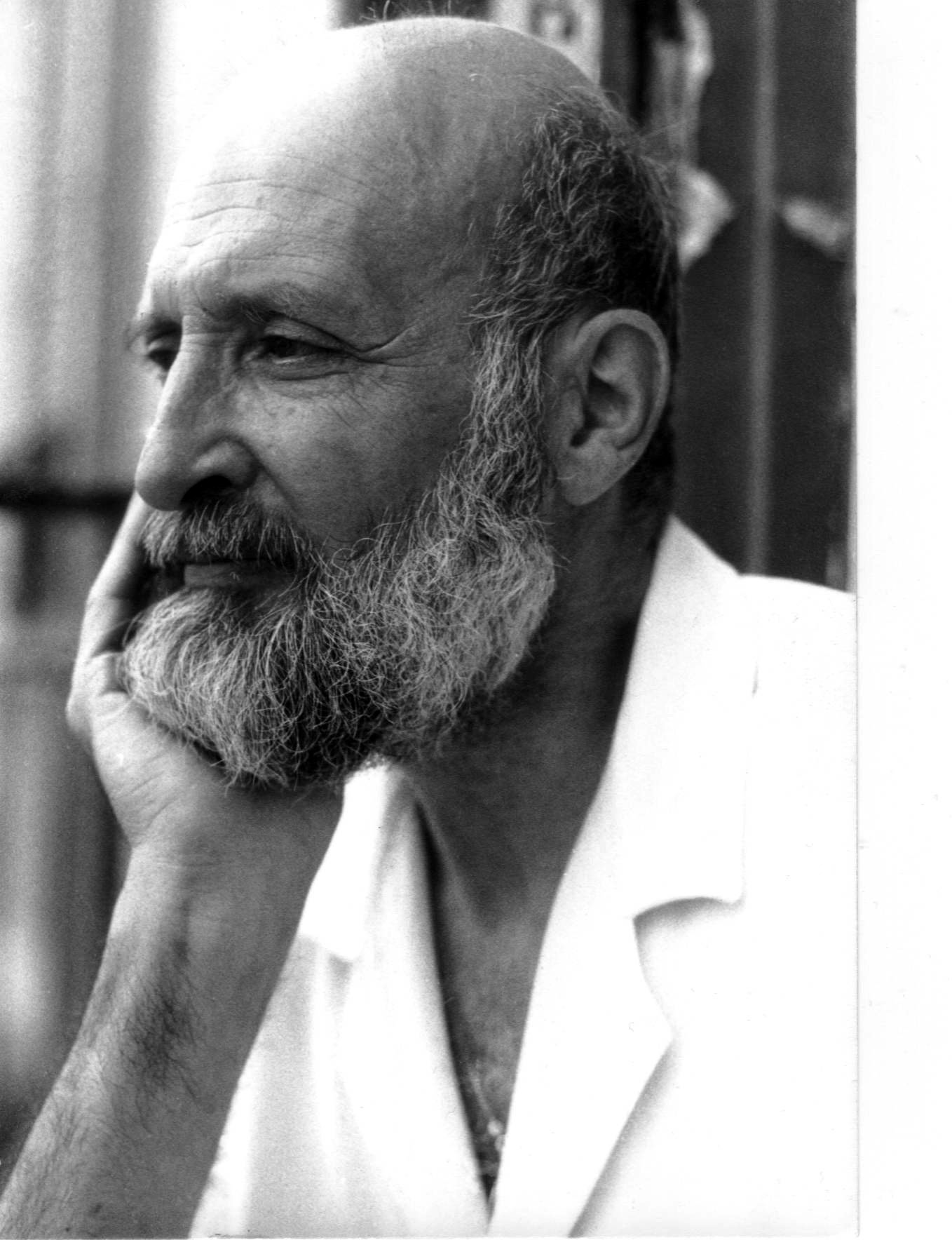
Attilio Micheluzzi in Naples, 1988

In 1988, Micheluzzi produced the long story Siberia for Corto Maltese, as well as Il triangolo maledetto (The Cursed Triangle), based on scripts by Federico Povoleri. That year, Comic Art also published his works Titanic (a revisitation of the 1972 story The Tragedy of the Titanic for Corriere dei Ragazzi) and Articolo 7 from the series I diritti umani (Human Rights).

In 1989, Micheluzzi contributed to the second special issue of Dylan Dog by Sergio Bonelli Editore, titled Gli orrori di Altroquando (The Horrors of Altroquando), another collaboration with Tiziano Sclavi. During this time, he also created short horror stories for the magazine Splatter by ACME, continuing a genre he had previously explored in works for the American market.

In Micheluzzi's final year of life, he worked on Corsaro, a series written by Luigi Mignacco and published in L'Eternauta. His last work, Afghanistan, appeared in issue no. 75 of the same magazine in January 1991 but remained incomplete.

In 1990, Micheluzzi illustrated Francisco Pizarro en Peru - Los trece de la Fama for a major project by Editorial Planeta-De Agostini, titled Relato del Nuevo Mundo. The project was dedicated to celebrating the 500th anniversary of the discovery of the Americas, with a script by Argentine writer Lilian Goligorsky. The volume was published in Spain in 1992.

== Works ==
- Petra chérie: series of 24 episodes, initially published in Il Giornalino starting in 1977. The series continued in 1982 with four final episodes published in alter alter (issues no. 97, 98, 100, and 101, by Milano Libri, 1982).
- L'uomo del Tanganika (Un uomo un'avventura no. 18, CEPIM, 1978)
- L'uomo del Khyber (Un uomo un'avventura no. 26, CEPIM, 1980)
- Johnny Focus: series of 5 episodes published in Orient Express (no. 1, 2, 3, 4 and 6, Edizioni L'isola Trovata, 1982)
- Marcel Labrume: series of 2 episodes published in alter alter (from no. 82 to no. 85, from no. 106 to no. 108 and then in no. 110, 111, 113 and 114, Editore Milano Libri, from 1980 to 1983)
- Molly Manderling (1982)
- Air Mail: series of 3 episodes published in Orient Express (from no. 13 to no. 16 and from no. 21 to no. 24, from 1983 to 1984) and in L'Eternauta (no. 42, 43, 44, E.P.C., from 1983 to 1986)
- Bab-el-Mandeb: story published in 10 installments in Corto Maltese (from no. 1 to no. 10, Milano Libri Edizioni, 1986)
- Rosso Stenton: series of 4 episodes published in L'Eternauta (from 1982 to 1986) and in Orient Express - I Protagonisti (1986)
- Roy Mann: series of 3 episodes published in Comic Art (1987-1988)
- Gli orrori di Altroquando: published in Speciale Dylan Dog (no. 2, Sergio Bonelli Editore, 1988)
- Titanic: story published in 10 installments in Comic Art (1988-1989)
- Pezzi da esposizione: published in Splatter (no. 1, ACME, 1989)
- Siberia: story published in 5 installments in Corto Maltese (dal no. 72 al no. 75, Milano Libri Edizioni, 1989)
- Miriam si sveglia a Natale: published in Splatter (no. 6, ACME, 1989)
- Pizarro in Perù - Los trece de la Fama (Editorial Planeta-De Agostini 1992)
- Corsaro: series of 3 episodes published in L'Eternauta (1990-1991)
- Afghanistan: story published in 2 installments in Comic Art (1991), poi in Edizioni NPE (2020) ISBN 9788894818468
- Jesus Detective San: single episode published in Ken Parker Magazine (no. 24, Parker Editore, 1995)

Reprints in volume

  - Il principe e il povero (Editrice Libreria della Famiglia 1979)
  - Petra chérie 1 (Visualprint 1980)
  - Petra chérie 2 (Visualprint 1980)
  - "No alla violenza" (Edizioni Messaggero di Padova 1981) - Contains: Anna Frank
  - Johnny Focus (Il Gatto & la Volpe 1981)
  - Marcel Labrume (Milano Libri 1981)
  - Petra chérie (Milano Libri 1982)
  - Johnny Focus reporter (Ivaldi 1982)
  - AA.VV., "Soldati di Ventura" (Ivaldi 1982) - Contains: Il sole di Montezuma, Il solitario di Juan Fernandez, Il pirata della regina
  - I reportages di Johnny Focus (Ivaldi 1982)
  - AA.VV., "Gli invincibili" (Edizioni Paoline 1983)- Contains: Martin Luther King and Gandhi
  - "I Protagonisti di Orient Express" no. 3: Rosso Stenton (Edizioni L'Isola Trovata 1984)
  - "Gli Albi di Orient Express" no. 4: Air Mail (Edizioni L'Isola Trovata 1984)
  - Molly Manderling (Ivaldi 1984)
  - "Gli Albi di Orient Express" no. 9: Air mail: Dry week end (Edizioni L'Isola Trovata 1985)
  - "I Protagonisti di Orient Express" no. 11: Rosso Stenton: Avventura in Manciuria (Edizioni L'Isola Trovata 1985)
  - Marcel Labrume à la recherche du temps perdu (Milano Libri Edizioni 1985)
  - "Gli Albi di Orient Express" no. 15: Air mail: Country fair photo (Edizioni L'Isola Trovata 1986)
  - "I Protagonisti di Orient Express" no. 16: Rosso Stenton: La lunga notte (Edizioni L'Isola Trovata 1986)
  - "Gli Albi di Orient Express" no. 22: Air mail: Palmer Special Number One (Edizioni L'Isola Trovata 1986)
  - Bab-el-Mandeb (Rizzoli - Milano libri 1987)
  - "Gli Albi di Orient Express" no. 32: Roy Mann in uno strano mondo (Edizioni L'Isola Trovata 1988)
  - "Gli Albi di Orient Express" no. 37: Roy Mann: Orizzonti di gloria (Edizioni L'Isola Trovata 1988)
  - AA.VV., "La grande avventura dei fumetti" no. 13 (DeAgostini 1990) - Contains: L'irresistibile Barone, Petra chérie
  - AAA.VV., I diritti umani 2 (Editrice Comic Art 1990) - Contains: I diritti umani: Articolo 7
  - Gli orrori di Altroquando (Arnoldo Mondadori Editore 1992)
  - "Best Comics" n. 22 (Editrice Comic Art 1993) - Contains: Roy Mann in uno strano mondo, Roy Mann: Orizzonti di gloria, Roy Mann: Quante volte tornerai
  - "I grandi del fumetto" no. 12: L'uomo del Khyber (Hobby & Work Italia 1996)
  - "I grandi del fumetto" no. 20: L'uomo del Tanganyka (Hobby & Work Italia 1996)
  - "Tascabilizard" no. 35: Mermoz (Lizard Edizioni 1999)
  - "I libri di Enzo Biagi" no. 145-146, Americani: storia dei popoli a fumetti (Arnoldo Mondadori Editore 1997) Contains: Arrivano i vichinghi, Una nuova patria per i padri pellegrini, Da est a ovest
  - "Dylan Dog Super Book" no. 2: Gli orrori di Altroquando (Sergio Bonelli Editore 1997)
  - Titanic (Lizard Edizioni 1998)
  - "Tascabilizard" no. 35: Siberia (Lizard Edizioni 1998)
  - "Tascabilizard" no. 40: Petra chérie primo volume (Lizard Edizioni 2000)
  - "Tascabilizard" no. 41: Petra chérie secondo volume (Lizard Edizioni 2001)
  - "SuperMiti" no. 32: Americani: storia dei popoli a fumetti (Arnoldo Mondadori Editore 1997) Contains: Arrivano i vichinghi, Una nuova patria per i padri pellegrini, Da est a ovest
  - "Tascabilizard" no. 49, Afghanistan (Lizard Edizioni 2002)
  - AA.VV., Splatter Anthology (Coniglio Editore 2002) - Contains: Pezzi da esposizione, Miriam si sveglia a Natale
  - "Tascabilizard" no. 55: Marcel Labrume (Lizard Edizioni 2004)
  - "Tascabilizard" no. 61: Johnny Focus primo volume (Lizard Edizioni 2004)
  - "Tascabilizard" no. 62: Johnny Focus secondo volume (Lizard Edizioni 2004)
  - "Tascabilizard" no. 63: Johnny Focus terzo volume (Lizard Edizioni 2004)
  - "Tascabilizard" no. 64: Johnny Focus quarto volume (Lizard Edizioni 2005)
  - "Maestri del Fumetto" (San Paolo Editore 2005) - Contains: Petra chérie: Furto al consolato, Spie a Venezia, Il cimitero di Psammatia, I cani di Costantinopoli
  - "La nuova storia del mondo a fumetti" (Arnoldo Mondadori Editore 2005) Contains: Arrivano i vichinghi, Una nuova patria per i padri pellegrini, Da est a ovest
  - "Tascabilizard" no. 67: Molly Manderling (Lizard Edizioni 2006)
  - Dal Tanganika al Khyber (Comma 22 2008)
  - Air Mail (Comma 22 2011)
  - Petra Chérie (Comma 22 2013)
  - AA.VV., Splatter (Rizzoli Lizard 2013) - Contains: Pezzi da esposizione, Miriam si sveglia a Natale
  - Capitan Erik vol. 2 - Diamanti (Allagalla Editore 2017)
  - Capitan Erik vol. 3 - Caraibi (Allagalla Editore 2019)
  - Capitan Erik vol. 4 - Vittoria (Allagalla Editore 2019)
  - Rosso Stenton: Shanghai (Little Nemo Art Gallery 2019)
  - "53 storie brevi " (Allagalla Editore 2020) - Contains: La locanda del pescatore
  - Dylan Dog - Gli orrori di Altroquando (Sergio Bonelli Editore 2020)
  - Marcel Labrume (Complete collection of the stories), Edizioni NPE, 2017 ISBN 9788894818215
  - Titanic, Edizioni NPE, 2018, ISBN 9788894818222
  - Pizarro in Perù, Edizioni NPE, 2018, ISBN 9788894818406
  - Siberia, Edizioni NPE, 2019, ISBN 9788894818451
  - Afghanistan, Edizioni NPE, 2020, ISBN 9788894818468
  - Roy Mann (Complete collection of the stories), Edizioni NPE, 2021 ISBN 9788836270323
  - L'uomo del Tanganyka, Edizioni NPE, 2022, ISBN 9788836270750
  - Petra Chérie (Complete collection of the stories), Edizioni NPE, 2022 ISBN 9788836270880
  - Rosso Stenton (Complete collection of the stories), Edizioni NPE, 2022, ISBN 9788894818598
  - Air Mail (Complete collection of the stories), Edizioni NPE, 2023, ISBN 9788836271009
  - L'uomo del Khyber, Edizioni NPE, 2023 ISBN 9788836271900
  - Mermoz, Edizioni NPE, 2023, ISBN 9788836271818
  - Bab el-Mandeb, Edizioni NPE, 2024 ISBN 9788836272211
  - I grandi generali, Edizioni NPE, 2024 (ISBN 9788836272655)

Foreign editions

France

- Marcel Labrume - Que tu es beau Marcel, t'es un salaud Marcel (Les Humanoïdes Associés 1983)
- Marcel Labrume - A la recherche des guerres perdues (Les Humanoïdes Associés 1983)
- Shanghai (Editions du Cygne 1983)
- Air Mail (Dargaud 1984)
- Air Mail: Dry Weekend (Dargaud 1985)
- Molly Manderling (Dargaud 1985)
- Petra chérie (Les Humanoïdes Associés 1985)
- Air Mail: Palmer Special Number One (Dargaud 1986)
- L'homme du Khyber (Chalmin 1986)
- L'homme du Tanganika (Chalmin 1986)
- Roy Mann (Comics USA 1990)
- Titanic (Casterman 1990)
- Rosso Stenton - Shanghai (Magic-strip 1990)
- Rosso Stenton - La longue nuit (Magic-strip 1991)
- Rosso Stenton - Yellow Christmas (Magic-strip 1991)
- Rosso Stenton - La longue nuit (Mosquito 2006)
- Rosso Stenton - Yellow Christmas (Mosquito 2007)
- Petra chérie (Mosquito 2008)
- Marcel Labrume (Mosquito 2009)
- Bab-el-Mandeb (Mosquito 2010)
- Mermoz (Mosquito 2013)
- Khyber (Mosquito 2016)

Belgium

- Johnny Focus: Destination Teheran (Artefact 1985)
- Titanic (Casterman 1990)
- Sibérie (Casterman 1991)
- Bab-el-Mandeb (Casterman 1993)

Switzerland

- Johnny Focus - La piste de Mombasa (Editions Kesselring 1985)
- Johnny Focus - Grand reporter du XXe siècle (Editions Kesselring 1985)
- Mermoz (Editions Kesselring 1987)

Denmark

- Air Mail: Palmer Special Number One (Carlsen Comics 1988)

Germany

- Air Mail - Ice bin ein As, Baby (Carlsen Verlag 1987)
- Air Mail: Dry Weekend (Carlsen Verlag 1987)
- Air Mail: Palmer Special Number One (Carlsen Verlag 1987)
- Bab-el-Mandeb (Carlsen Verlag 1990)
- Der Mann von Tanganjika (Feest Comics 1993)
- Ein Mann ein Abenteuer - Der Mann von Tanganjika (Egmont 1997)
- Johnny Focus - Gesamtausgabe - Band 1 (Zack Edition)
- Johnny Focus - Gesamtausgabe - Band 2 (Zack Edition)
- Johnny Focus - Gesamtausgabe - Band 3 (Zack Edition 2021)

Spain

- Johnny Focus (Nueva Frontera 1982)
- En la selva de Tanganika (Nueva Frontera 1982)
- Reportajes de Johnny Focus (Editor Valencia 1983)
- Air Mail (Ninth Comic 2014)
- Mermoz (Ninth Comic 2015)
- Air Mail (Ninth Comic 2015)
- Petra Chérie (Ponent Mon 2017)
- Siberia (Ponent Mon 2018)
- Roy Mann (Toutain Editor 1990)
- Francisco Pizarro en Perù - Los trece de la fama (Planeta-De Agostini 1992)

Netherlands

- Schaduw van de wraak (Centripress 1981)
- Operatie Koenisberg (Centripress 1982)
- Marcel Labrume - Wat ben Je mooi, Marcel, Je bent een ploert Marcel (Casterman 1986)
- Marcel Labrume - Op Zoek Naar de Verloren Oorlogen (Casterman 1987)
- Petra Chérie: zoete nevels van Vlaanderen (Casterman 1987)
- Petra Chérie: Spionnen in Venetie (Casterman 1988)
- Petra Chérie: de roos van de Bosporus (Casterman 1988)
- Johnny Focus - Mombasa Road (Centripress 1989)
- Johnny Focus 2 (Loempia 1990)
- Rosso Stenton - Shanghai (Loempia 1990)
- Rosso Stenton - Twee druppels bloed in de sneeuw (Loempia 1990)
- Rosso Stenton - De Lange Nacht (Loempia 1991)
- Rosso Stenton - Yellow Christmas (Loempia 1991)
- Molly Manderling (Loempia 1992)

Croatia

- Marcel Labrume (Fibra 2012)
- Petra chérie (Fibra 2012)
- Sibir/Titanic (Fibra 2021)
- Air Mail (Fibra 2022) - Contiene: Air Mail, L'uomo del Tanganika, L'uomo del Khyber, Bab-el-Mandeb

USA

- Euronovel Number 1 - Shanghai (Pacific Comics Club 1985)
- Air Mail su Aces n. 1/5 (Acme Press 1988)
- The farewell song of Marcel Labrume (Fantagraphics 2024)

Bibliography

Monographies

- S. Alligo (edited by), Micheluzzi, Little Nemo, Torino 2010
- S. Alligo (edited by), Attilio Micheluzzi. Rosso Stenton: Shanghai, Little Nemo, Torino 2020
- R. Curci (edited by), Attilio Micheluzzi. Fumetti tra fantasia e avventura, Silvana Editoriale, Cinisello Balsamo (MI) 2021
- G. Frediani (edited by), Attilio Micheluzzi, «Avventura Magazine», Sergio Bonelli Editore, Milano 2015e vita di un classico, Comic Art, Roma 1992
- C. Napoli (edited by), Attilio Micheluzzi. Architetto d'avventure, Black Velvet, Bologna 2008
- M. Paganelli - V. Mollica (edited by), Attilio Micheluzzi, Editori del Grifo, Montepulciano (SI), 1986

== Awards ==
- 1980: ANAF Award (National Association of Comic Book Lovers), Reggio Emilia - "Jury Award".
- 1980: Bronze Neptune Award, Bologna.
- 1980: Yellow Kid Award (14th International Comics, Illustration, and Animation Film Festival, Lucca).
- 1981: ANAF Award (National Association of Comic Book Lovers), Reggio Emilia - "Best Storyteller Award".
- 1981: Bronze Neptune Award, Bologna.
- 1984: Prix Alfred at the Angoulême International Comics Festival with the comic Marcel Labrume - À la recherche du temps perdu "as told to me.
- 1987: ANAF Award (National Association of Comic Book Lovers), Reggio Emilia - "Best Author Award".
- 1998: The Attilio Micheluzzi Award was established, awarded annually at the Napoli Comicon.
