= Zona X =

Italian comic book

Zona X is an Italian comic book originally published in Italy by Sergio Bonelli Editore between 1992 and 1998. The creator of the series is Alfredo Castelli. One Zona X issue is 196 pages, which includes two complete stories or episodes. Zona X consists of a series of unusual/bizarre/fantastic stories; in the first nine issues, such stories were always unrelated to each other. Starting from volume 10, four mini-series were introduced; the writers of the series were Vincenzo Beretta (Magic Patrol), Federico Memola (La Stirpe di Elän and Legione Stellare), and Luigi Mignacco (Robinson Hart).
