= Rosco & Sonny =

Creative team
- Written by: Claudio Nizzi
- Artist(s): Giancarlo Alessandrini

Rosco & Sonny is an Italian comics series created by Claudio Nizzi and Giancarlo Alessandrini.

== Background ==
The series was started in 1981 by Claudio Nizzi as the writer and the artwork of Giancarlo Alessandrini, later replaced by Rodolfo Torti and Rudy Salvagnini. It was published for more than 30 years and about 280 episodes by the comics magazine Il Giornalino. Main characters were the blond-haired Rosco and red-haired Sonny, a couple of policemen characterized by unorthodox investigative methods. The last episode, "Missione finale", was published May 5, 2012 and ended with the couple of cops who leave the police, Sonny becoming a basketball coach and Rosco becoming a writer.
