= J'aime lire =

French children's magazine

J’aime lire
- Categories: Children's literature
- Frequency: Monthly
- Publisher: Bayard Presse
- First issue: January 1977; 49 years ago
- Country: France
- Language: French
- Website: jaimelire.com

J’aime lire ("I love to read" in French) is a French magazine aimed at children aged 7–10. Published by Bayard Presse since 1977, it is easily identifiable by its red cover and its mascot, a blue colored pencil named "Bonnemine" (a play-on-words meaning both "looking well" and "good pencil lead").

Each issue contains:

1. An illustrated novel;
2. Some pages of games and puzzles;
3. Comics (originally Tom-Tom and Nana).

The magazine has more than 2 million readers each month and is one of the best-selling titles in its category.

An English language edition is published with the title Adventure Box since 1996.
