= Claudio Nizzi =

Italian comic author (born 1938)

Claudio Nizzi (born 9 September 1938 in Sétif, Algeria) is an Italian comic author.

He started his career as comic scriptwriter in 1963, writing for the comics magazine Il Vittorioso. During 1969 he started working for Il Giornalino creating many characters (Larry Yuma - in collaboration with Carlo Boscarato, Capitan Erik, Nicoletta and Rosco & Sonny). His partnership with Sergio Bonelli Editore started in 1981, writing some stories for Mister No. In 1983 he started writing stories for Tex Willer. In 1988 he created Nick Raider, the first detective story published by Sergio Bonelli Editore.

Nizzi appointed Renato Queirolo as the supervisor of the Nick Raider series in 1992, and continue to write for Tex Willer. In 2001 Nizzi created Leo Pulp.

He was given the U Giancu's Prize at the International Cartoonists Exhibition in 2002.
