= Il Giornalino =

Italian comics magazine

- A cover of Il Giornalino.
- Founded: 1924; 102 years ago
- Country: Italy
- Based in: Milan
- Language: Italian

Il Giornalino is an Italian comics magazine published in Italy.

== History and profile ==
Il Giornalino was founded by the Catholic publisher Edizioni San Paolo of Alba in 1924.

During its history, the magazine has published the Italian translation of numerous American and European comics series, such as Looney Tunes, The Smurfs, Lucky Luke, Popeye, Iznogoud, Hanna-Barbera's characters, Asterix and the Teenage Mutant Ninja Turtles. It also featured adaptations of famous novel and literary works, including The Betrothed, Robinson Crusoe, Gargantua and Pantagruel (Gargantua e Pantagruel), Hamlet and others.

Original characters published on the pages of Il Giornalino include Capitan Erik, Commissario Spada, Dodo & Cocco, Jack Speed, Larry Yuma, Micromino, Nicoletta, Petra Chérie, Piccolo Dente, Pinky, and Rosco & Sonny.

Authors who worked for Il Giornalino include Dino Battaglia, Carlo Peroni, Benito Jacovitti, Attilio Micheluzzi, Ferdinando Tacconi, Luciano Bottaro, Franco Caprioli, Sergio Toppi, Tiziano Sclavi, Giorgio Cavazzano, Alfredo Castelli, Lino Landolfi, Daniele Panebarco, Massimo Mattioli, Sergio Zaniboni.

== See also ==
- List of magazines published in Italy
