= Italian comics =

Comics originating in Italy

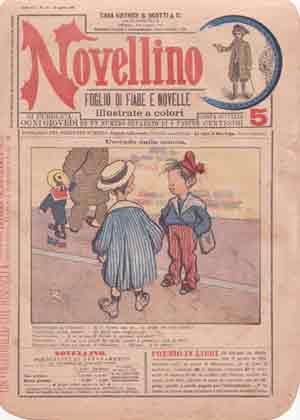
- Earliest publications: 1908
- Publishers: Edizioni Alpe; Sergio Bonelli Editore; Panini Comics; Star Comics; Edifumetto
- Publications: Il Corriere dei Piccoli; Topolino; Corto Maltese; Valentina; Diabolik
- Creators: Antonio Rubino; Hugo Pratt; Guido Crepax; Magnus; Sergio Bonelli
- Series: "Bilbolbul" "Tex Willer" "Dylan Dog" "RanXerox" "Martin Mystère"
- Languages: Italian

Related articles

Italian comics, known as fumetto [fuˈmetto], plural form fumetti [fuˈmetti], are comics that originate in Italy. The most popular Italian comics have been translated into many languages. The term fumetto (literally little puff of smoke) refers to the distinctive word balloons that contain the dialogue in comics (also called nuvoletta, "little cloud", in Italian).

In English, the term fumetti can refer to photo comics, regardless of origin or language.

== History ==
Italian fumetto has its roots in periodicals aimed at younger readers and in the satirical publications of the 19th century. These magazines published cartoons and illustrations for educational and propagandist purposes. The first illustrated satirical publication appeared in 1848, in L'Arlecchino, a daily paper published in Naples. Other noteworthy examples of satirical papers of the period include Lo Spirito Folletto published in Milan, Turin's Il Fischietto and Il Fanfulla, established in Rome in 1872.

As far as publications for kids, some of the most significant titles of the period are Il Giornale per i Fanciulli (1834), Il Giovinetto Italiano (1849), and Giornale per i bambini (1881).

In 1899 Il Novellino debuted. The paper was the first to publish Outcault's Yellow Kid in Italy in 1904, but the first Italian comic did not appear until four years later.

=== Birth ===
On December 27, 1908, the first mainstream publication primarily for comics, Il Corriere dei Piccoli, appeared on Italian newsstands. The first issue introduced readers to the adventures of Bilbolbul by Attilio Mussino, featuring a little black kid who is considered the first Italian comic character.

Despite being officially considered the birthplace of fumetto, the Corrierino, as it was nicknamed, did not use balloons in the stories that it publishes, opting instead for captions in verse. Regardless, the sequential narration and the recurring characters made the publication the first Italian comic magazine.

The most prolific comics illustrator before World War I was Antonio Rubino. Both Mussino and Rubino based their strips on parodies of school learning: "Bilbolbul" is a parody of idioms, while "Quadratino" (literally "Little Square") is a parody of geometry.

Il Corrierino introduced American comics to an Italian audience: "Happy Hooligan" was renamed "Fortunello", "The Katzenjammer Kids" became "Bibì e Bibò", "Bringing Up Father" was "Arcibaldo e Petronilla", "Felix the Cat" became "Mio Mao".

Following Il Corrierino's spectacular success (reaching 700 000 copies), several other periodicals appeared during the following years: Il Giornaletto (1910), Donnina (1914), L'Intrepido (1920), and Piccolo mondo (1924).

=== Fumetto during Fascism ===
The fascist regime was quick to recognize the potential for propaganda through the new medium. During the 1920s several periodicals published educational comics for Italian youth, including Il Giornale dei Balilla (1923) and La piccola italiana (1927).

The three most popular characters of the period, reprinted for decades on Corrierino, were:

- "Il Signor Bonaventura" by Sergio Tofano (1917), was the Italian response to "Happy Hooligan", with a big difference: if the latter is always unlucky, at the end of every story Bonaventura wins a million liras.
- "Sor Pampurio" (an Italian equivalent of "Bringing Up Father") by Carlo Bisi (1925), was a parody of parvenus: not really Fascist, it expresses bourgeois classism.
- "Marmittone" by Bruno Angoletta (1929), was a mildly antimilitaristic strip, the maximum anti-authoritarianism allowed by Fascism.

Beginning January 1, 1939, the publication of foreign comics was forbidden, and Italian material was required to follow a strict standard, exalting heroism, patriotism, and the superiority of the Italian race. To work around these restrictions, some publishers simply renamed American heroes with Italian names. The only exception to the censorship was Topolino, the Italian name for Mickey Mouse, published by Nerbini starting on December 31, 1931. Apparently, the reason behind this special treatment for Walt Disney's character was Benito Mussolini's children's passion for the little mouse. In 1935 Nerbini sold Topolino to Mondadori, which published it with great success until 1988.

In 1932 Milan publisher Lotario Vecchi started Jumbo, a weekly magazine that many consider the first true Italian comics publication. The magazine reached a circulation of 350,000 copies, sanctioning comics as a mainstream medium with broad appeal.

In 1937 Il Vittorioso appeared, a Catholic magazine entirely composed of Italian comics. It was an attempt to compete with similar secular publications like L'Avventuroso (1934), Il Monello (1933), and L'Audace (1937).

=== After World War II: Bonelli and the rise of the comic book ===
The end of World War II marked a flurry of activity in the Italian comic press: many titles that were forced to suspend publication during the war came back to saturate the newsstands, joined by new publications often backed by improvised publishers looking for a quick buck. Finally this oversupply of comic material resulted in a crisis of the traditional comic magazine. Among the numerous publications of the period were L'Avventura (1944), a Roman magazine that presented American adventure strips like Mandrake, L'Uomo Mascherato (The Phantom), and Flash Gordon. Another Roman publication appeared in 1945: Robinson, a first attempt to target a more adult audience. It introduced several American characters like Prince Valiant, Tarzan, Secret Agent X-9, Rip Kirby, Li'l Abner and Dick Tracy. Robinson lasted until 1947, publishing 90 issues.

In 1945, one of the most original magazines of the period was born: L'asso di Picche published in Venice as a result of the work of a group of young Venetian artists, including Alberto Ongaro, Damiano Damiani, Dino Battaglia, Rinaldo D'Ami, and above all Fernando Carcupino and Hugo Pratt. Their distinctive approach to the art form earned them the name of "Venetian School" of comics. Among the characters created for the magazine were Pratt's L'Asso di Picche, Battaglia's Junglemen, Draky and Robin Hood.

Inspired by the success of the Catholic Il Vittorioso, the Italian Communist party decided to use the comic medium for their own purposes: in 1949 Il Pioniere was born. Aimed at a very young audience, the new publication presented fantasy material as well as adventures, with an eye to the social issues of the period.

On Il Vittorioso began the career of the most famous satirical comic writer of post-war Italy, Benito Jacovitti. However, his most popular character, Cocco Bill (1957), a parody of Western comics, was published in the newspaper Il Giorno and then in the other Catholic comic magazine Il Giornalino.

In 1954 Il Disco Volante began publication. It is the Italian version of British weekly Eagle, and introduced Dan Dare to the Italian public. In 1955 Tintin appeared, adapted from the French Tintin magazine, which first presented Franco-Belgian comics to the Italian public.

But the most significant phenomenon of the period was the appearance of comics books. Printed in a variety of formats, from strip size to booklets to giant size, they presented collected stories from the periodicals as well as new adventures of Italian characters. It is on the comic books pages that heroes made in Italy gained popularity, eventually overshadowing their American counterparts.

Among the host of Italian series that were created during these years, Tex Willer is without doubt the most renowned. Born on September 30, 1948, from the imagination of Gian Luigi Bonelli and from the pencil of Aurelio Galleppini, Tex Willer became the model for a line of publications that became known as Bonelliano, from the name of the publisher. These comic books presented complete stories in 100+ black and white pages in a pocket book format. The subject matter was always adventure, whether western, horror, mystery or science fiction. The bonelliani are to date the most popular form of comics in the country.

Some of the series that followed Tex Willer were Zagor (1961), a tomahawk-wielding hero who protects the imaginary Darkwood forest in eastern US, Comandante Mark (1966), featuring a soldier in the American independence war, and more recently Mister No (1975), about an American pilot who operates a small tourist flying agency in the Amazonian jungle, and Martin Mystère (1982), featuring an anthropologist/archaeologist/art historian who investigates paranormal phenomena and archaeological mysteries.

Another popular series, Diabolik featuring a criminal mastermind, has been published since the 1960s, and influenced later series such as Kriminal and Satanik (see Fumetti neri). The latter was created in the 1960s by one of the most famous duos of comics history, Magnus & Bunker, whose most outstanding creation, however, is the humorous espionage series Alan Ford (1969).

Another famous author of humouristic strips is Franco Bonvicini, whose Sturmtruppen met wide success abroad.

In the 1970s and early '80s, many young intellectual artists centred around the famous student city of Bologna began to be influenced by the underground comic scene of the United States, typified by the work of Robert Crumb. Artists such as Andrea Pazienza, Filippo Scòzzari, Stefano Tamburini, Tanino Liberatore, and Massimo Mattioli published stories with dark and surreal themes, ranging from political activism, to struggles with drug addiction and the disagio and disillusionment of youth culture in Italy. Many of the comics were extremely violent and sexual and attempted to stretch the comic genre to its vary limits in both style and "good taste." Satirical magazines such as Frigidaire and Il Male often printed these stories in episodic formats or as vignettes in their monthly publications.

Though read by a more restricted audience, in the past years comics series with the greatest critical success are Corto Maltese, by Hugo Pratt, and Valentina by Guido Crepax. While the former is a kind of summa of the evolution into an adult form of the classic adventure comics, the latter gave birth to that special kind of erotic comics quite typical of the Italian scene, and whose main pupils have been in more recent years Milo Manara and Paolo Eleuteri Serpieri.

=== Topolino universe and Disney Italia ===
Italy also produces many Disney comics, i.e., stories featuring Disney characters (from Mickey Mouse and Donald Duck universes). After the 1960s, American artists of Disney comics, such as Carl Barks and Floyd Gottfredson did not produce as many stories as in the past. At present American production of new stories has dwindled (Don Rosa publishes in Europe), and this niche has been filled by companies in South America, Denmark and Italy. The Italian 'Scuola disneyana' has produced several innovations: building the Italian standard length for stories (30 pages), a pocket book format with 3 strips a page, reinterpreting famous works of literature in 'Parodie', long stories up to 400 pages.

Italy prints around 8000 pages of new Disney stories per year, exported worldwide (it makes up 50% of the total production). The main publication, digest size Topolino, prints only new stories every week, but there exist 32 different series of reprints going on, for 30 million of copies sold each year. Among the most important artists and authors are Marco Rota, Romano Scarpa, Giorgio Cavazzano, Massimo De Vita, Giovan Battista Carpi and Guido Martina. The best known character created in Italy is Paperinik (known as Duck Avenger or Phantom Duck to English audiences); an innovative series is PK (Paperinik stories with an American superheroes flavour).

Since the late 1990s, Disney Italia produced other popular stories such as W.I.T.C.H. or Monster Allergy.

== Notable authors and artists ==
- Alessandro Biffignandi
- Antonio Rubino
- Antonio Serra
- Alfredo Castelli
- Aurelio Galleppini
- Attilio Micheluzzi
- Ade Capone
- Angela Giussani
- Andrea Pazienza
- Andrea Lavezzolo
- Bruno Angoletta
- Bruno Bozzetto
- Bepi Vigna
- Benito Jacovitti
- Claudio Castellini
- Dino Battaglia
- Dario Guzzon
- Emanuele Taglietti
- Ferdinando Tacconi
- Franco Bonvicini
- Fernando Carcupino
- Franco Saudelli
- Giancarlo Alessandrini
- Gianni De Luca
- Giovanni Gualdoni
- Giovanni Sinchetto
- Giancarlo Berardi
- Guido Buzzelli
- Gian Luigi Bonelli
- Giorgio Cavazzano
- Guido Crepax
- Gianluca Costantini
- Hugo Pratt
- Ivo Milazzo
- Luciano Bernasconi
- Luciano Bottaro
- Lorenzo Mattotti
- Luciana Giussani
- Leonardo Ortolani
- Luca Enoch
- Max Bunker, pseudonym of Luciano Secchi
- Milo Manara
- Michelle Medda
- Maurizio Colombo
- Massimo Rotundo
- Mauro Boselli
- Pietro Sartoris
- Pino Daeni, pseudonym of Pino Dangelico
- Paolo Eleuteri Serpieri
- Renzo Calegari
- Roberto Renzi
- Magnus, pseudonym of Roberto Raviola
- Romano Scarpa
- Stefano Tamburini
- Sergio Tofano
- Sergio Toppi
- Silvia Ziche
- Sergio Bonelli
- Tanino Liberatore
- Tiziano Sclavi
- Vittorio Giardino
- Walter Molino
- Zerocalcare

== Notable comics ==
=== Adventure comics ===
- Corto Maltese, Sergeant Kirk, Fort Wheeling, Jesuit Joe, Morgan, all by Hugo Pratt
- Diabolik by Angela and Luciana Giussani
- Il Grande Blek by EsseGesse
- Kriminal and Satanik by Max Bunker and Magnus
- Lo Sconosciuto (The Unknown) by Magnus
- Lazarus Ledd by Ade Capone
- RanXerox by Tanino Liberatore and Stefano Tamburini

Sergio Bonelli Editore adventure comics

- Tex Willer by Gian Luigi Bonelli (since 1948)
- Zagor by Sergio Bonelli (since 1965)
- Martin Mystère by Alfredo Castelli (since 1982)
- Dylan Dog by Tiziano Sclavi (since 1986)
- Nathan Never by Michele Medda, Antonio Serra and Bepi Vigna (since 1991)
- Mister No by Sergio Bonelli (from 1975 to 2006)
- Ken Parker by Giancarlo Berardi and Ivo Milazzo (from 1977 to 1998)

=== Humour comics ===
- Bilbolbul by Attilio Mussino
- Il Signor Bonaventura by Sto
- Marmittone by Bruno Angoletta
- Alan Ford and Maxmagnus by Max Bunker and Magnus
- Cattivik by Bonvi (later Silver)
- Lupo Alberto by Silver
- Sturmtruppen by Bonvi
- Cocco Bill by Benito Jacovitti
- Rat-Man by Leo Ortolani
- Topolino

=== Erotic comics ===
- Click (Il Gioco) and Giuseppe Bergman by Milo Manara
- Valentina by Guido Crepax
- Druuna by Paolo Eleuteri Serpieri
- Calavera by Enrico Teodorani and Joe Vigil
- Djustine by Enrico Teodorani

=== Fantasy comics ===
- W.I.T.C.H.
- Monster Allergy
- Gormiti
- Angel's Friends
- Winx Club

== See also ==
- Donald Duck pocket books
- For a non-exhaustive list of Italian authors, see List of comic creators
- For a non-exhaustive list of Italian comic books, see List of comic books
