= 1996 in comics =

Notable events of 1996 in comics.

== Events ==
=== January ===
- The first issue of The Sensational Spider-Man (Marvel).
- In ToyFare winter's special, the debut of the strip Twisted Mego Theatre.
- L'homme qui aimait les poupées (The dolls lover) – by Jean-Charles Krahen (Glénat Editions); the first album of the noir series Gill Saint-Andrè.

=== February ===
- February 10: The final episode of Secret Agent X-9 is published.
- February 14: Ilah's Cordelia debuts in the Flemish newspaper De Morgen.
- The New Titans is canceled by DC with issue #130.
- Star Trek vol. 2 is canceled by DC with issue #80.

=== March ===
- March 2: The Flemish newspapers Het Laatste Nieuws and De Nieuwe Gazet launch a weekly children comics supplement titled De Samson en Gert Krant, based on the popular TV show Samson en Gert. It will run until 1998, after which it is renamed.
- March 14: Evronians, by Alessandro Sisti, Ezio Sisto and Alberto Lavoradori, album "number zero" of PKNA; debut of the principal characters of the series (the A. I. One, the journalist Angus Fangus, the female robot Lyla Lai, the super-heroine Xadhoom).
- With issue #75, The Sandman ends its run. (DC/Vertigo)
- First issue of the magazine Mondo Naif (Star Comics), meant as a showcase for the young Italian cartoonists.
- Prigioniero del futuro (Prisoner of the future) – written by Alfredo Castelli and Antonio Serra, drawn by Gino Vercelli and Claudio Castellini; first team-up between Nathan Never and Martin Mystere (more exactly, an android into which the Martin's memory has been poured up).

=== April ===
- April 27: Dutch illustrator Peter Vos and comics artists Jan Kruis and Peter van Straaten are knighted.
- April 30: In the Disney comics magazine Topolino, Basettoni e la dieta da fame, by Giorgio Pezzin and Romano Scarpa is first published, which marks the debut of Petulia, Chief O’Hara's wife.
- Berlin, city of stones, by Jason Lutes, first episode of the series Berlin (Black Eye productions).
- Destiny: A Chronicle of Deaths Foretold, by Alisa Kwitney and Death: The time of your life, by Neil Gaiman (Vertigo), spin-offs of the series The Sandman.
- First issue of the series Hitman, by Garth Ennis and John McCrea (DC Comics).
- DC vs. Marvel, crossover between the two main comics’ universes, published conjunctly by the two companies.
- Marvel discontinues its Marvel Edge imprint

=== May ===
- Kingdom come, by Mark Waid and Alex Ross (DC comics).
- In Zona X, L’uomo venuto dal futuro (The man from future), by Luigi Mignacco and Fabrizio Russo, first episode of the series about the time traveller Robinson Hart (Bonelli).
- In L’isola che non c’è, first strip of Venerdì 12, by Leo Ortolani.
- Un million sans impôts (A tax-free million), by André-Paul Duchâteau and Tibet (Le Lombard)

=== June ===
- June 11: in Topolino, Silvia Ziche's Il papero del mistero, papernovela in uno sproposito di puntate (The mystery duck, duck-novela in a blunder of episodes) begins. The story, lasting for even 24 episodes, is a parody of the never-ending Latin-American telenovelas.
- June 22: in Telerama, first episode of The Francis Blake affair, by Jean Van Hamme and Ted Benoit; it's the first album of the series Blake and Mortimer not realized by Edgar P. Jacobs.
- June 28: Charles M. Schulz receives a star on the Hollywood Walk of Fame.
- First issue of Batman Black and White (DC Comics).
- In X-Men #53, the Onslaught saga, by Mark Wald and Andy Kubert, begins.
- Doctor Strange, Sorcerer Supreme is canceled by Marvel with issue #90.
- La valle del terrore (The valley of fear) by Claudio Nizzi and Magnus (Bonelli). The album, a Tex Willer adventure inspired by the life of John Sutter, is the swansong for Magnus, who works to it for seven years and dies just before its publishing.
- When Blow the Winds of Time?, by Alessandro Sisti and Claudio Sciarrone, album 0/2 of PKNA is first published, which marks the debut of the principal antagonist of the series, the time traveller Red Raider.
- La fortesse de Makiling by Jean Van Hamme and Philippe Francq (Dupuis).

=== July ===
- Diamond Comic Distributors acquires Capital City Distribution.
- The Avengers #400: "History Repeats Itself," by Mark Waid, Mike Weiringo, and Tom Palmer. (Marvel Comics).
- Xanadu, by Alfredo Castelli and Paolo Morales (Bonelli). Sergej Orloff, the villain of the Martin Mystere series, redeems and is reconciled with the hero, in addition to healing from his mutilations.

=== August ===
- August 8: In Anders And & Co., A matter of some gravity, by Don Rosa is serialized.
- August 9: The Adventures of Nero by Marc Sleen receives a comic mural in Hasselt.
- Detective Comics #700: "Legacy," Part I, "Progeny of the Demon," by Chuck Dixon, Graham Nolan, and Scott Hanna.
- Heroes reborn by Jim Lee and Rob Liefeld, huge cross-over involving the whole Marvel universe; Avengers and Fantastic Four, officially dead, are transferred in a pocket universe. Five Marvel titles are closed and relaunched.
- Captain America (1968 series) is canceled by Marvel with issue #454.
- Le Klondyke by Morris, Yann and Jean Leturgie (Lucky Editions).

=== September ===
- The British satirical cartoon magazine Punch, which went bankrupt in 1992, is revived. It will run until 2002.
- Fantastic Four (1961 series) is canceled by Marvel with issue #416.
- The Avengers (1963 series) is canceled by Marvel with issue #402.
- Iron Man (1968 series) is canceled by Marvel with issue #332.
- Newspaper strip A Couple of Guys begins publication
- Ô Alexandrie, by Jacques Martin (Casterman).

=== October ===
- October 11: The 30th Asterix story is published, La Galère d'Obélix (translated in English as Asterix and Obelix All at Sea). In the story Obelix drinks the magic potion for the first time since he was a child, with dire consequences.
- October 12–13: During the Stripdagen in Breda, the Netherlands, Hanco Kolk receives the Stripschapprijs. Het Nederlands Stripmuseum receives the first P. Hans Frankfurtherprijs (formerly the Jaarprijs voor Bijzondere Verdiensten), named after P. Hans Frankfurther, who died in a drowning accident in August.
- First issue of Batman: The long Halloween, by Jeph Loeb and Tim Sale (DC comics).
- Bloody Mary, by Garth Ennis and Carlos Ezquerra (Helix)
- First issue of House of secrets, by Steven T. Seagle (Vertigo)
- In Anders And & Co, A little something special by Don Rosa.
- L’heure du kidnapping by André-Paul Duchâteau and Tibet (Le Lombard)

=== November ===
- First issue of Superman Adventures (DC Comics)
- The Final Night, by Kari Kiesel and Stuart Immonen (DC Comics); death of Hal Jordan.
- Fax from Sarajevo by Joe Kubert (Dark Horse)
- In Witchblade 10, debut of The darkness (Top Cow)
- First album of Epileptic, by David Beauchard (L’association)
- Geants by Jean Van Hamme and Grzegorz Rosiński (Le Lombard).
- Ombre su Darkwood (Shadows on Darkwood) by Mauro Boselli and Gallieno Ferri (Bonelli); team-up between Zagor and “Elsewhere”, the secret service with an important role in the Martin Mystere series.

=== December ===
- December 5: Dutch cartoonist Len Munnik wins the Inktspotprijs for Best Political Cartoon.
- December 27: Marvel Entertainment files for Chapter 11 bankruptcy protection.
- December 27 : in Anders And & Co The Vigilante Of Pizen Bluff, by Don Rosa.
- Batman: The Long Halloween (1996 series) #1 - DC Comics
- Superman: The Wedding Album: Clark Kent marries Lois Lane (DC Comics).
- In Spider-Man 75, The night of the Goblin, by Howard Mackie and John Romita jr. Death of Ben Reilly; Peter Parker resumes his role as Spider-Man.
- Aliens: Lovesick by Richard Forgues (Dark Horse).
- First album of the Italian Sci-fi saga I custodi del maser (The maser's wardens) by Massimiliano Frezzato (Vittorio Pavesio productions).
- First issue of the Italian paranormal series Samuel Sand, spin-off of Lazarus Leed (Star comics).

=== Specific date unknown ===
- Will Eisner publishes the book Graphic Storytelling and Visual Narrative.

== Deaths ==
=== January ===
- January 19: Bernard Baily, American comics artist, writer and publisher (co-creator of The Spectre and Hourman), dies at age 79.
- January 22: Arthur Piroton, Belgian comics writer (Les Krostons) and artist (Michel et Thierry, Jess Long, Les Casseurs de Bois), dies at age 64.
- January 28:
  - Jerry Siegel, American comic book writer (DC Comics, Marvel Comics, Archie Comics), dies at age 81.
  - Burne Hogarth, American comics artist (Tarzan) dies at age 84.
- January 31: Claus Deleuran, Danish comics artist (Thorfinn, Rejsen til Saturn, Pirelli & Firestone, The People's Illustrated History of Denmark), dies at age 49.

=== February ===
- February 5: Roberto Raviola, aka Magnus, Italian comics artist (Alan Ford, Kriminal, Satanik, Lo Sconosciuto, Necron) dies from cancer at age 56.
- February 6:
  - Boody Rogers, American comics artist (Sparky Watts, Babe), dies at age 91.
  - Franco Tarantola, Italian comics artist, dies at age 53.
- February 13: Cara Sherman-Tereno, American comics artist (Life With The Vampire) dies of leukemia at the age of 44.
- February 26: Cork, Dutch cartoonist, (Mr. Cork/Ruitenheer), dies at age 64.

=== March ===
- March 6: Jack Abel, American comics artist and inker (Star Spangled War Stories, Our Fighting Forces, Legion of Super-Heroes), dies at age 68.
- March 7: Ramon Monzon, French comics artist (Cha'pa et Group-Group, Jehan des Bis, Finnekin Jones, Bouzouk, le Petit Prince, Testar le Robot), dies at age 65.
- March 14: Jack Berrill, American comics artist (Gil Thorp), dies of cancer at age 72.
- March 15: Homer Groening, Canadian-American film director, cartoonist and comics artist (Phoebe, Get Your Man), dies at age 76.
- March 25: Mike Roy, Canadian comics artist (The Saint, Nero Wolfe comics, Akwas), dies at age 75.
- March 29: André Oulié, French comic artist (Robin L'Intrépide), dies at age 98.

=== April ===
- April 12: Bob Zschiesche, American comics artist (Our Folks, Harley Hogg, assisted on Gasoline Alley and Snuffy Smith), dies at age 67 from an aneurysm.
- April 14: Mary Oosterdijk, Dutch animator and comics artist (assisted on Kappie), dies at age 82.
- April 20: Håven, Swedish cartoonist and comics artist (Gamle Uno), dies at age 74.

=== May ===
- May 6: Eric Larnoy, French illustrator and comic artist (Thanéros), dies at age 35 from liver cancer.
- May 7: Piet Worm, Dutch comics artist (De Vrolijke Vaderlandse Geschiedenis, Professor Zegellak), dies at age 95.
- May 9: Carl Fallberg, American comics writer and artist (Disney comics) dies at age 80.
- May 26: Francis Paid, Dutch comics artist (Joris Voetangel, Toonder Studios), dies at age 71.

=== June ===
- June 11: Gin, Spanish comics artist, animator, and illustrator (Nathalie, Denise, Disney comics), dies at age 65.
- June 15: Nonkel Fons, Belgian priest, publisher, and comics writer (founder of the comics magazine Zonneland, writer of Rikske en Fikske) dies at age 84.
- June 19: Curt Swan, American comic book artist (Superman, Legion of Super-Heroes), dies at age 76.

=== July ===
- July 2: Mike Parobeck, American comics artist (Batman Adventures) dies from diabetes at age 30.
- July 7: Arno, French comic artist (Alef-Thau), dies at age 35.
- July 23: Jim Pabian, American animator, animated film director and comics artist (Disney comics, Walter Lantz comics), dies at age 87.

=== August ===
- August 12: Mark Gruenwald, American comics writer and editor (Marvel Comics) dies at age 43.
- August 28: P. Hans Frankfurther, Dutch film & TV producer, activist and organizer (founder of Het Stripschap, namegiver to the annual P. Hans Frankfurther comics prize), drowns at age 64, trying to save his son (who also drowns).

=== September ===
- September 3: Petar Grigorov, Bulgarian painter and comics artist, dies at age 83.
- September 14: Fernando Bento, Portuguese illustrator and comics artist, dies at age 85.
- September 23: Hiroshi Fujimoto, Japanese manga artist (Doraemon, Perman, Mojacko, Jungle Kurobe, Kiteretsu Daihyakka, Pokonyan!, Esper Mami, Chimpui, Obake no Q-tarō), dies at age 62.
- September 26: Alex Kotzky, American comics artist and writer (Apartment 3-G, the backgrounds in The Spirit), dies at age 73.

=== October ===
- October 14: Ferd Johnson, American comics artist (Texas Slim, Lovey-Dovey, continued Moon Mullins), dies at age 90.

=== December ===
- December 2: Don Dohler, American film director, publisher and comics artist (Pro Junior), dies at age 60.
- December 7:
  - Paul Ollswang, American comics artist (Dreams of a Dog, Memories of Doofer), dies at age 50 or 51.
  - Giuseppe Perego, Italian comics artist (Buffalo Brill, Boby, Disney comics, Rolf Kauka comics), dies at age 81.
  - Desimir Zizovic Buin, Serbian comics artist (Mirko i Slavko), dies at age 76.
- December 22: Jack Hamm, American comics artist (Drawing the Head and Figure, Cartooning the Head and Figure), dies at age 80.

=== Specific date unknown ===
- Themos Andreopoulos, Greek comics artist (Mikros Serifis) and publisher (the magazine Tam-Tam), dies at age 78 or 79.
- Stan Clements, Australian comics artist (Tom Dunne, Scientific Detective, Dinny Dare, Jim & Jill, Rays of Destiny, Matt Marcus), dies at age 87.
- Jim Davis, American animator and cartoonist (The Fox and the Crow), dies at age 80 or 81.
- Zoltán Forrai, Hungarian-Dutch comics artist (Pipa, Miklós), dies at age 94 or 95.
- Rick Hoover, American animator and comics artist (Disney comics), dies at age 55 or 56.
- Malcolm Jones III, American comics artist (Sandman), commits suicide at circa age 37.
- Frank Langford, British comic artist (continued Jack and Jill, drew various comics based on TV series for Lady Penelope Magazine and TV Action, drew romance comics for DC Comics), dies at age 69 or 70.
- Wang Letian, Chinese comics artist and cartoonist, dies at age 78 or 79.
- Terry Patrick, British comics artist (worked for DC Thomson), dies at age 66 or 67.
- Maria Emília Roque Gameiro, aka Màmia, Portuguese comics artist, dies at age 94 or 95.
- Albert Tolf, American comics artist (assisted on Gasoline Alley, cartoons of San Francisco), dies at age 84 or 85.
- Dorothy Urfer, American comic artist (Annibelle), dies at age 90 or 91.

== Exhibitions ==
- January 19 – February 18: "Twisted Sisters — Drawing the Line", White Columns, New York City — artwork by M. K. Brown, Julie Doucet, Aline Kominsky-Crumb, Caryn Leschen, Fiona Smythe, Darcy Stanger, Carol Swain, and others

== Conventions ==
- March 2: Halleluja Con (Church of St. Paul the Apostle, New York City) — produced on the spur of the moment after the sudden cancellation of the scheduled Great Eastern Conventions New York show. First iteration of the Big Apple Convention.
- March 22–24: Motor City Comic Con I (Novi Expo Center, Novi, Michigan)
- March 23: Alternative Press Expo (San Jose, California)
- April 19–21: Pittsburgh Comicon (ExpoMart/Radisson, Monroeville, Pennsylvania) — guests include Stan Lee, Jim Shooter, and Julius Schwartz
- April 26–28: WonderCon (Oakland, California) — 10th annual convention
- May 18: Ramapo Comic Con X (Spring Valley, New York) — "EC Tribute" with guests Al Williamson and Marie Severin; other guests include Julius Schwartz, Murphy Anderson, Dick Ayers, Joe Sinnott, Joe Staton, Eric Shanower, Mark Schultz, Walt Simonson, Louise Simonson, Evan Dorkin, Sarah Dyer, David Mazzuchelli, and Howard Cruse
- Summer: "Lazy CAPTION" (Oxford Union Society, Oxford, England)
- Summer: Canadian National Comic Book Exposition (Holiday Inn on King, Toronto, Ontario, Canada) — c. 2,900 attendees; guests include Dale Keown, Adam Hughes, Stuart Immonen, Pat Lee, Ken Lashley, Mike Zeck, and Dave Ross
- June: Heroes Convention (Charlotte Convention Center, Charlotte, North Carolina) — guests included Alex Ross, Mike Wieringo, Ron Garney, George Pérez, Nick Cardy, Dan Jurgens, and Tom Smith
- June 2: Houston Comix Fair & Toy Show XIV (Medallion Hotel, Houston, Texas) — final edition of Comix Fair; guests include Mart Nodell and Shannon Wheeler
- June 21–23: Chicago Comicon (Chicago, Illinois) — 25,000 attendees; Guest of honor: Will Eisner; other guests: Harlan Ellison, Larry Marder, Heidi MacDonald, Mike Richardson, Kurt Busiek, Sergio Aragonés, Evan Dorkin, Paul Levitz, Julius Schwartz, Mercy Van Vlack, and George Pérez
- June 21–23: Dragon Con (Atlanta Hilton & Towers/Westin Peachtree Plaza/Atlanta Civic Center, Atlanta, Georgia) — 13,400 attendees; guests include Neil Gaiman, John Byrne, Peter David, Kevin Nowlan, Chris Claremont, Al Feldstein, Robert Williams, Mark Bodé, Al Williamson, William Stout, Mark Schultz, Jeff Smith, Reed Waller, Rich Buckler, John Kricfalusi, and Bob Burden.
- July 4–7: San Diego Comic-Con (San Diego Convention Center, San Diego, California) — 36,000 attendees. Special guests include Donna Barr, David Brin, Paul Chadwick, Steve Dillon, Mort Drucker, Ben Edlund, Garth Ennis, Dave Gibbons, Joe Giella, Dave McKean, Jim Mooney, Kurt Schaffenberger, and François Schuiten
- July 26–28: Dallas Collectors Con (Plano Convention Center, Plano, Texas) — substitute event for cancelled Dallas Fantasy Fair; official include Bernie Wrightson, Howard Cruse, Rob Liefeld, and Kurt Busiek.
- July 27–28: Dallas Fantasy Fair (Market Hall, Dallas, Texas) — cancelled at the last minute; the Harvey Awards were scheduled to be presented there and had to be rescheduled for later in the year
- September 21: Small Press Expo (Holiday Inn, Bethesda, Maryland) – guests include Jeff Smith, Charles Vess, Evan Dorkin, Jimmy Gownley, David Lapham, and Shannon Wheeler
- September 26–29: International Comics and Animation Festival (ICAF) (Georgetown University and Alliance Française, Washington, D.C.) — guests include Claire Bretécher (guest of honor) and Pierre Christin
- October 12–13: Motor City Comic Con II (Dearborn Civic Center, Dearborn, Michigan)
- October 12: Underground Press Conference/Independent Comics Expo (UPC/ICE) (Chicago Cultural Center, Chicago, Illinois) — sponsored by Chicago Comics and Mary Kuntz Press; official guests include Jay Lynch; exhibitors include Chris Ware, Joe Chiappetta, Ivan Brunetti, Dave Cooper, Joe Zabel, Gary Dumm, Terry LaBan, Jessica Abel, and Jason Lutes.
- October 25–27: Dynamic Forces New York Comic Book Convention (Sheraton New York Hotel, New York City) — official guests include Barry Windsor-Smith and Dan Jurgens
- November 1–3: Atlanta StarCon & Comics (Marriott North Central Hotel, Atlanta, Georgia) — produced by the former organizer of the Atlanta Fantasy Fair; official guests include George Pérez, Michael O'Hare, Kane Hodder, Frank Marshall, and Kathleen Kennedy.
- November 29 – December 1: Mid-Ohio Con (Columbus, Ohio) — guests include Roger Stern, Darryl Banks, Dick DeBartolo, Tom and Mary Bierbaum, Tony Isabella, Paul Jenkins, Mark Waid, Leah Adezio, Dan Mishkin, Berni Wrightson, Mark Crilley, P. Craig Russell, Jim Shooter, Murphy Anderson, Dick Ayers, Tom Batiuk, John Byrne, Dick DeBartolo, Julius Schwartz, and Jeff Smith

== First issues by title ==
=== DC Comics ===
- Mister Miracle

Release February Writer: Kevin Dooley. Artist: Steve Crespo

- Hitman

Release March Writer: Garth Ennis. Artist: John McCrea

- Batman: Black and White 4-issue mini-series

Release March

- Essential Vertigo: The Sandman. Black-and-white reprints of the 1988 series.

Release June Writer: Neil Gaiman. Artist: Sam Kieth Artist:Mike Dringenberg

- Supergirl

Release July Writer: Peter David. Artist: Gary Frank

- Nightwing

Release August Writer: Chuck Dixon. Artist: Scott McDaniel

- Teen Titans

Release August Writer: Dan Jurgens. Artist: Dan Jurgens Artist: George Perez

- Essential Vertigo: Swamp Thing. Black-and-white reprints of the 1982 series, beginning with #21.

Release September Writer: Alan Moore. Artist: Steve Bissette Artist:John Totleben

- JLA

Release NovemberWriter: Grant Morrison. Artist: Howard Porter

=== Independent titles ===
Allegra
Release: August by Image Comics. Writer: Steven T. Seagle. Artist: Scott Clarke

Cyberpunx
Release: March by Image Comics. Writer: Robert Loren Fleming Artist: Ching Lau

Keyhole
Release: June by Millennium Publications. Writers: Dean Haspiel, Josh Neufeld, R. Walker, Chris Cliadakis, Linda Perkins. Art by: Haspiel, Neufeld, and Perkins.

Tim Curry
Release February by Curry Comics.

=== Marvel Comics ===
- Onslaught: X-Men

Release August

- Onslaught: Marvel Universe

Release October

- The Avengers (1996 series) #1

Release November

- Captain America (1996 series) #1

Release November

- Fantastic Four (1996 series) #1

Release November

- Iron Man (1996 series) #1

Release November
