= Luigi Corteggi =

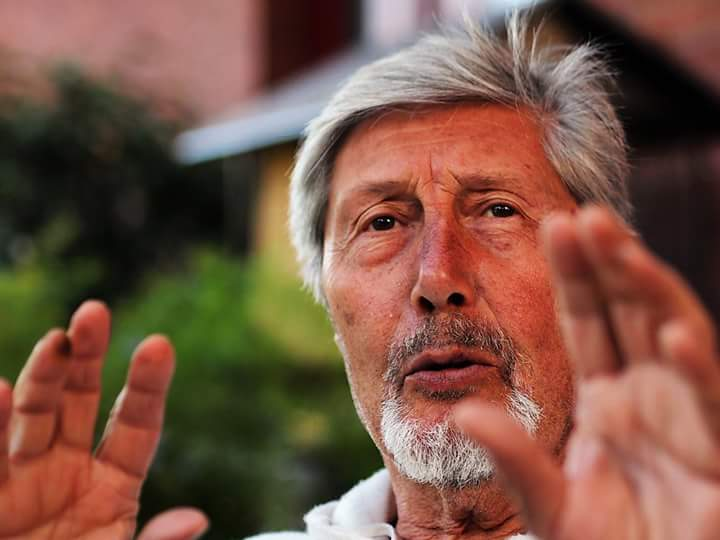

Luigi Corteggi, also known as Cortez (born 21 June 1933, Milan, died 26 July 2018, Casorzo), was an Italian comic artist, painter, director and illustrator. He is best known for his graphic works for Editoriale Corno and for Sergio Bonelli Editore, for which he created the designs of comics such as Kriminal and Dylan Dog. He is considered by specialized critics as the most famous art director in the world of Italian comics.

== Biography ==
Born in 1933 in Milan, Luigi Corteggi attended the Brera Academy of Fine Arts, then graduated, and managed his advertising studio for some years. He then moved to the publishing industry, cooperating first with Editrice Universo and then, from 1965, with Editoriale Corno, where he was responsible for the graphics design of Kriminal, Satanik, Maschera Nera, Gesebel, Eureka, and Alan Ford. He also illustrated some of their covers and made ink drawings for the boards. Corteggi also oversaw the publishing in Italy of Marvel Comics titles. After making some stories of Maschera Nera, he worked on Kriminal and Satanik, two characters from the Italian black genre created by Max Bunker, for whom he created the logos of the titles and also designed some episodes, as well as hundreds of covers. He later worked as a draftsman and inker for other Bunker characters like Gesebel and Alan Ford (of the latter he also illustrated the first ten covers).

As a curator, he also dealt with the layouts of the many publications of the publishers and also produced the comic book series Thomas, then a series of humorous postcards, some graphic works for magazines, encyclopedias, and scientific publications. The relationship with Corno was interrupted in 1975 when he entered as artistic director at Sergio Bonelli Editore where he was asked to deal with both the technical and the more creative part concerning general graphics, lettering, covers, and related titles and brands as well as managing contacts with first-time designers. In the 1970s he also cooperated with Il Giornalino.

In the 1980s, he created artworks for an edition of the comic book series Collana Rodeo called The Lost Spaceship. It was the only science fiction story in the history of the series. As a graphic designer, he realized the titles of all the Bonelli publications that began after his arrival, such as Ken Parker, Mister No, Martin Mystère, Dylan Dog, Nick Raider, Nathan Never and many others that still stand out today for their original and elegant graphics for an italian comic series.

Luigi Corteggi spent his final years in the province of Alessandria, and died in Casorzo in July 2018 at the age of 85.

== Bibliography ==
- Luigi Corteggi - Un pittore prestato al fumetto - Glamour International (1994);
- Cortez - La grafica di Corteggi dalla Corno alla Bonelli. A cura di S. Mercuri - IF (2005) ISBN 9788852401367 - ISBN 8852401369.
