= Gesebel =

Publication information
- Publisher: Editoriale Corno
- Schedule: Monthly
- Format: Ongoing series
- Genre: Science fiction
- Publication date: February 1966 – October 1967
- No. of issues: 23
- Main character: Gesebel

Creative team
- Written by: Max Bunker, Erasmo Buzzacchi
- Artist(s): Magnus, Luigi Cortegg, Roberto Cortella Peroni

Gesebel is an Italian science fiction comics series, created by writer Max Bunker (Luciano Secchi) and artist Magnus (Roberto Raviola), who had previously created several other characters, such as Alan Ford, Kriminal, and Satanik.

== Publication history ==
Gesebel was published monthly (aside from two bi-weekly issues) by Editoriale Corno, from February 1966 to October 1967, ending with issues 23. The series included also Buck Rogers stories by George Tuska.

After issue #6, Bunker and Magnus were replaced by, respectively, Erasmo Buzzacchi, Luigi Corteggi (who also drew the covers), and Roberto Cortella Peroni.

== Characters and story ==
Gesebel is the queen of the far Virgin Planet, whose people is mostly composed by war-like and beautiful women, organized into a military society. Gesebel owns the largest man harem on the planet, whom she used to whip after any sexual intercourse, as well as a golden-teethed cat (called Pussycat) who has the power to kill any man who tries to escape from her. The men who rebel against Gesebel are destined to be slaughtered by beasts in the circus.
