= Kriminal (film) =

- Italian film poster
- Directed by: Umberto Lenzi
- Written by: Umberto Lenzi; David Moreno Mingote
- Based on: Kriminal (comic) by Magnus; Max Bunker
- Produced by: Giancarlo Marchetti; Claudio Teramo
- Starring: Glenn Saxson; Helga Liné; Andrea Bosic; Ivano Staccioli; Esmeralda Ruspoli
- Cinematography: Angelo Lotti
- Edited by: Jolanda Benvenutti; Antonio Gimeno
- Music by: Romano Mussolini
- Production companies: Filmes Cinematografica; Estela Films; Copercines
- Distributed by: Titanus (Italy); Vídeo Mercury Films (Spain)
- Release dates: December 23, 1966 (Italy); April 28, 1969 (Spain)
- Running time: 95 minutes
- Countries: Italy; Spain
- Language: Italian

Kriminal is a 1966 superhero film co-written and directed by Umberto Lenzi, based on the Italian comic book created by Magnus and Max Bunker. It stars Glenn Saxson in the titular role, along with Helga Liné, Andrea Bosic, Ivano Staccioli and Esmeralda Ruspoli. In the film, master thief Kriminal is embroiled in a diamond smuggling plot.

The film was followed by a sequel, Il marchio di Kriminal (lit. The Mark of Kriminal), a year later.

== Plot ==
Master thief Kriminal escapes from death row in London on the initiative of Scotland Yard Inspector Milton, who thintends to tail him in order to recover the stolen Crown Jewels. The cunning outlaw manages to escape the police tailing him, taking refuge in the home of Margie, his ex-wife, now secretary to Lady Gold. Lady Gold has a company importing and exporting precious stones, and Kriminal learns that the diamonds of the wealthy aristocrat, whose son is engaged to Margie, are being transferred to Istanbul.

Kriminal goes to the airport, only to learn that the couriers are two identical twins - Inge and Trude. Unsure who to rob, he snatches Trude's purse but discovers it's empty. The next day, Kriminal learns that Lady Gold has received a million pounds from her insurance company for the diamond theft and suspects she's actually running a scam. After contacting her, Kriminal discovers that the jewels were indeed stolen and that the entire thing was a plot by the twins.

Kriminal goes in search of the diamonds in Spain, where he meets Trude, who reveals that the plot was organized by Lady Gold's lover, Alex Lafont, and that they hadn't exchanged bags, but rather their identities. Trude is killed by a chance shot, and Kriminal can only identify that Inge is in Istanbul. After further investigation, he learns that she runs an underground casino with Alex, who has now become her partner. Kriminal makes Inge fall in love with him and decides with her to steal Alex's diamonds. Kriminal replaces Alex's shaving cream with vitriol, sending his disfigured rival to the hospital with bandages all over his face. It's therefore easy for Kriminal to impersonate him after killing him and steal the diamonds.

Pursued by Inspector Milton, however, Kriminal must flee and, in the process, loses the stolen goods in a river. However, his misadventures aren't over, as he fails to escape and falls into a trap.

== Cast ==
- Glenn Saxson as Anthony "Kriminal" Logan
- Helga Liné as Inge / Trude
- Andrea Bosic as Inspector Patrick Milton
- Ivano Staccioli as Alex Lafont
- Esmeralda Ruspoli as Lady Gold
- Mary Arden as Gloria Farr
- Dante Posani as Frank
- Franco Fantasia as Commissioner Mourad
- Maria Luisa Rispoli as Margie Swann
- Armando Calvo as Kandur
- Mirella Pamphili as Ms Dickinson
- Rossella Bergamonti as Nurse
- Cesare Martignoni as Zeiland
- John Stacy as Sir Winston

== Production ==
In August 1964, the fumetti neri series Kriminal began publication. The comics often contained themes of sex and violence, which included the title character seducing scantily-dressed women, then strangling or stabbing them to conceal his identity. Director Umberto Lenzi stated that he initially wanted to make a comic book-inspired film with an adaptation of Diabolik. Lenzi found himself unable to get the rights to Diabolik, which had purchased by Dino De Laurentiis. Lenzi then attempted an adaptation of Satanik, but eventually settled on Kriminal. Lenzi argued with Kriminal's creator Luciano Secchi about the changes he made with the character, which Lenzi would later describe as "a bit Nazi-skin fascist. We made a fun film." Lenzi opted for a lighter tone in contrast to the combination of sex and violence present in the fumetti.

The lead role was played by Dutch actor Glenn Saxson (real name: Roel Bos), who previously had leading roles in Spaghetti Westerns such as Go with God, Gringo. Saxson did a screen test for Lenzi, who was looking to portray Kriminal as a younger character compared to his fumetti counterpart.

Shooting for the film lasted approximately two months. Interiors were shot in Rome, while exteriors were filmed in Madrid, Istanbul, The Black Sea and London. Most of the physical stunts in the film were performed by Saxson's double Attilio Serverini, except for one of the more dangerous sequences involving Kriminal running atop a speeding train.

== Release ==
Kriminal was released in 1966. The film was described by film historian Roberto Curti as being "moderately successful", which resulted in a sequel, Il marchio di Kriminal, directed by Fernando Cerchio, being released the following year. Kriminal was released on April 28, 1969 in Spain as La máscara de Kriminal.

An official English-language Blu-Ray and Ultra HD Blu-ray of Kriminal was issued in 2026 on the Cult Films label.

== Reception ==
In a retrospective review, Curti wrote that Kriminal is "fast, fun and entertaining overall, but it is also disappointingly tame." Curti mentioned that the film is "lacking the comic book's tongue-in-cheek attitude and political uncorrectness, while much of the film looked more like one of those travelogue James Bond rip-offs that were flooding the screens at the time."

Lenzi later noted that when he re-watched the film on television, that it "seemed even better than when I shot in 1966: then I was a bit perplexed, now I appreciate the aspect of irony in it, something which comic strips didn't have because they were vulgar, horrible."

== See also ==
- List of Italian films of 1966
- List of Spanish films of 1966
