= La Compagnia della Forca =

Italian comic book series (1977- 1979)

The Company of the Gallows (original title: La Compagnia della Forca) is an Italian comic book series written and drawn by Magnus from 1977 to 1979 (with the collaboration of Giovanni Romanini).

== Characters ==
The Company of Monblanc (this is the real name of the company) is a seedy company of mercenaries led by Sir Percy of Montblanc, bumbling knight and young heir of Montblanc family. Other company members are:

- Capitan Golia, magister militum ("master of soldiers"), warrior
- Annalisa of Montblanc, sister of Percy (and more skillful than him), archer
- Bertrando, minstrel and slinger (physically resembling Romanini)
- Messer Ciacco, sutler (and former executioner)
- Ser Crumb, squire of Sir Percy (with a physical resemblance with Magnus)
- Crusca, scullery-boy

The group is joined in some adventures by Doctor Nadir, a scholar of oriental sciences, with his friend King Frog (a frog), and Lattemiele, a cunning accountant.

Oscuro Signore ("Dark Lord"), driven by a prophecy, is trying to destroy the company using his minions. Among them, Crocca, a female vulture which starts the series telling company's story and the defeat of Evil.

Among the characters there are sages, corrupt monks, genies, dragons, dwarves, giants, fantasy and historical characters (York and Lancaster from the War of the Roses, Dracula).

== Themes ==
The story is an epic quest without its basic elements: the group, the aim, the battles, a clear separation between the good and the evil, a strong protagonist who decides what to do.

The style of Magnus pencils often retains funny and grotesque elements shown in Alan Ford.

The text, instead, is a mixture of sarcastic Max Bunker's style, Tolkien fantasy elements, medieval history, classical Northern European and Middle Eastern traditions and lore, and personal travels (for example, Magnus' travel to Croatia).
