= Giovanni Romanini =

Italian cartoonist (1945–2020)

Giovanni Romanini (Bologna, 27 December 1945 – Bologna, 20 March 2020) was an Italian comic artist and cartoonist noted for collaboration with Magnus (pen name of Roberto Raviola).

== Biography ==
He began his career in animated cinema, also working for Carosello (a TV serial), for which he designed Solomon the pirate and Tacabanda.

He made his debut in the world of comics in the late 1960s, following his meeting with Magnus. Having assimilated the style and the graphic trait, he alternated with him in the creation of the plates first by Kriminal, then by Satanik, on texts by Max Bunker. When Magnus left the creation of Alan Ford to devote himself to something else, Romanini, who performed the inks alternating with Paolo Chiarini, remained for a few years in the team of the character, also creating the inks on the drawings of Paolo Piffarerio, who took over from Magnus. He then collaborated for many years on many later works by Magnus, in particular as an inker.

Piffarerio had a different style from Magnus, and according to many, incompatible with Alan Ford's style. Logically, as had happened years before with Kriminal and Satanik (in which Romanini had taken over from Magnus), the character was entrusted to those who could keep the characters invented by Magnus unaltered, and Romanini was the author whose style was closest to the master. But this was not the case. [Without source] Romanini, however, continued for almost four more years to create the bends while maintaining the original style of the character. Just before the end of his collaboration on the series he was entrusted with three stories of Alan Ford who illustrated entirely by himself, pencils and ink, replicating the style of Magnus (n. 114 Dried plum (December 1978), n. 121 Tarlomania (July 1979), and No. 124 One day like this (October 1979).

He then collaborated with Magnus on the production of the fork company series (19 issues, since 1977 for Edizioni Geis). He also designed many other characters of the black and erotic genre such as Wallestein for Edifumetto and Theo Kalì (some issues published in 1973 and 1974 by Photometalgrafica Emiliana), Ulula (36 numbers + 3 supplements from 1982 to 1985 for Edifumetto), Bionika ( 10 numbers in 1984 and 1985 for Edifumetto), [6] Pornstars (in 1985 and 1986 for Edifumetto), Lady Domina (12 numbers in 1988 and 1989 for Edifumetto), The boys of the 3rd B (from 1988 for Edifumetto, with Filippucci) and others.

His last collaboration with Magnus was for the realization of the history of Tex, La valle del terrore, published in the special known as "Texone" for Bonelli, in which he took on the task of drawing the horses and finishing some boards.

He also collaborated for four years with Disney in making four Mickey Mouse stories, published from number 1941 to number 2029. In 2007 he also participated as an interviewee in two documentaries dedicated to comics: Magnus, dedicated to the master Magnus, and The Diabolikal Super-Kriminal, dedicated to the black photo novel Killing.

He later joined the staff of Bonelli's designers for the Martin Mystère comic series.

On 20 March 2020, Romanini died of a heart attack at the age of 75.
