= Lo Sconosciuto =

Unknow, "Lo Sconosciuto"

Lo Sconosciuto (Italian: [lo skonoʃˈʃuːto], The Unknown [One]) is an Italian comics series created in 1975 by Roberto Raviola, better known by his pseudonym Magnus. It has been translated into English as The Specialist.

The series and its eponymous character was created by Magnus after a series of trips abroad and was defined together with his friend, the singer and writer Francesco Guccini. It was the first great creation by Magnus after he had left Editoriale Corno and his partnership with writer Max Bunker, with whom he had created famous series such as Kriminal and Alan Ford. Published in July 1975 by Edizioni Del Vascello (Renzo Barbieri's publisher), it is considered his finest achievement. The last Sconosciuto story was released in 1984, though a short prologue for another, never published story appeared in 1996 as a dedication to his friend, the cartoonist Franco Bonvicini, who had recently died.

== Synopsis ==
Lo Sconosciuto owes this nickname to his second name, "Unknow" (without the final "n", misspelling intentional). He is a disillusioned, former mercenary who tries to forget the wounds of his past, usually without success. This past is only partially shown: as a former member of the Foreign Legion in Algeria and Vietnam, he learnt combat techniques and the use of weapons. After a conscience crisis, he tries to escape the horrors he had experimented searching for jobs all around the world. However, the fate seems to compel him to take part to new kills and obscure international plots.

Lo Sconosciuto in his last story of the 1970s.

Unknow's stories are renowned for their striking realism, and are set in various countries, everywhere his skills are needed. They show without censorship several aspects of international politics and trades, including drugs, corruption, violence, terrorism (included the Italian one in the 1970s), hidden wars, espionage. Magnus' panels add deepness to the crude realism of the stories, through a perfectionist rendering of the landscapes and the events themselves. Violence apart, the uncensored representation of a sex scene gave Sconosciuto's stories the mark of pornography for several years in the 1970s. This, together with other problems and the slowness of the meticulous Magnus in finishing the panels, forced the monthly series to end with N°6. As an end, Magnus showed Unknow being shot twice in the belly while trying to prevent a slaughter in a hotel.

In 1981, Lo Sconosciuto was back in the comics pages of the newspapers La Nazione and Il Resto del Carlino. He does not take part in the events related (about drug trade and the seizing of a plane), however, appearing only as a storyteller in some panels. One year later, Magnus finished a new full story for the magazine Orient Express. In a second story, he showed Unknow being operated in Jerusalem and his rehabilitation.

The masterpiece of the series is L'uomo che uccise "Che" Guevara (The Man Who Killed "Che" Guevara), an exceptionally dramatic story appeared in 1984–1985. As in all his last stories, Unknow plays only a marginal role. The true protagonist is Alejandro Mosquera, a former medical officer of the Bolivian Army, now drug-addicted: he had taken part in the Guevara's execution and now is tormented by the ghosts coming from his past. His deeds intermingle with those of Unknow and the international secret organisation for which he works, and with excerpts from Guevara's Bolivian Diary about his last days as guerrilla leader.

== Chronology ==
=== Regular series ===
- Poche ore all'alba - July 1975
- Largo alle tre api - August 1975
- Morte a Roma - September 1975
- I cinque gioiellieri - October 1975
- Il sequestrato della Sierra - November 1975
- Vacanze a Zahlè - January 1976

=== Other stories ===
- Una partita impegnativa - July 1981, Il Resto del Carlino and La Nazione
- Il Volo del "Lac Leman" - December 1981, Il Resto del Carlino and La Nazione
- Full Moon in Dendera - June 1982, Orient Express N°1-4
- La fata dell'improvviso risveglio - May 1983, Orient Express N°10
- L'uomo che uccise Ernesto "Che" Guevara - July 1983, Orient Express N°12-18 and 20–21
- Nel frattempo - March 1996, Comix vol.5 N°3

=== In English ===
- The Specialist: Full Moon in Dendera, Catalan Communications, 1987
