= Eureka (Italian magazine) =

Italian comics magazine

- A cover of the magazine featuring Lupo Alberto, Andy Capp and Sturmtruppen
- Categories: Comic magazine
- Frequency: Monthly
- First issue: November 1967
- Final issue: August 1989
- Country: Italy
- Language: Italian

Eureka was a monthly comic magazine published in Italy from 1967 to 1989.

== History and profile ==
Eureka was founded in 1967 by Luciano Secchi, who also served as editorial director for 222 of the first 240 issues. It was the second Italian magazine following linus entirely devoted to comics, but differently from linus it avoided any intellectualism and any political stance.

The magazine initially focused on English and British productions. The contents included humorous comic strips such as Al Capp (who also served as mascotte of the magazine), Bringing Up Father, Alley Oop, Tumbleweeds, Miss Peach, The Perishers, Hugh Morren's Tommy Wack, and he comic strips of Don Martin; crime and adventure series published by the magazine included Kerry Drake, Joe Palooka, James Bond, Modesty Blaise, Spirit, Red Barry, Burne Hogarth's Drago. In the first years Italian production was only represented by Maxmagnus and by occasional short stories. There was also a significant room devoted to articles of comics criticism.

Starting from the 1970s the Italian contents gradually grew, and included Bonvi's Sturmtruppen and Cronache del Dopobomba, Silver's Lupo Alberto, Pino Zac's Kirie e Leison and L'Orlando Furioso, Secchi's and Paolo Piffarerio's Fouche, Sergio Barletta's Mr. Manager, Luca Novelli's Historiettes. Between 1977 and 1978, the brief direction of Maria Grazia Perini tried to expand the political and social commitments of the magazine, but the lack of response in terms of sales led to Secchi returning as a director and to the magazine returning to focus almost entirely on comics.

In the 1980s sales started to decline, and in an attempt to appeal new readers the magazine introduced several manga series and the supplement Urka, a separate magazine fully in color. In July 1983, direction passed to Alfredo Castelli and Silver, who tried to innovate the magazine introducing new columns and new series. The magazine eventually closed in August 1984.

In October 1988, after over four years of hiatus, Secchi tried to relaunch the magazine. The magazine mainly republished old material and closed after only 8 issues. Between 1990 and 1992 four special volumes of the magazine, variously titled Eureka Sole and Eureka Avventura Classic, were released. The Eureka brand was later used by Secchi for three "Eureka Graphic Novel" anthology volumes, destined for libraries and printed in limited edition, published between 1992 and 1994.

== See also ==
- List of magazines published in Italy
