= UER =

UER may refer to:

- European Broadcasting Union (Union européenne de radio-télévision)
- European University of Rome (Università Europea di Roma), an Italian Catholic university
- United to End Racism, campaigning organisation
- Union of Romanian Jews (Uniunea Evreilor Români)
- Unión Entrerriana de Rugby, body that rules the game of rugby union in Entre Ríos, Argentina

== See also ==
- Uèr
