= Necron =

Necron may refer to:

- Necron (comics), a 1981-1985 adult comic series
- Necron (Warhammer 40,000), a fictional undead alien race
- Necron (Final Fantasy), a villain from Final Fantasy IX
- Nekron, a DC Comics supervillain
- Nekron, a villain from the 1983 animated film Fire and Ice
- Necron, a demon from the two-part Charmed episode "A Witch's Tail"
- Necron, a boss from Hypixel Skyblock

== See also ==
- Necrom, a fictional character appearing in American comic books published by Marvel Comics
