= Milady 3000 =

Milady

Publication information
- First appearance: Il Mago #94–96 (Jan–Mar 1980)
- Created by: Magnus (Roberto Raviola)

In-story information
- Alter ego: Paulina Zumo
- Species: Human
- Partnerships: Uèr (android)

Milady 3000 (Italian: Milady nel 3000) is an Italian comic series featuring an eponymous character, created in 1980 by Magnus for the magazine Il Mago. The series continued until 1984 (also in the magazine Eureka), and was later published in France (in Métal Hurlant), in the United States (in Heavy Metal), in Belgium and Spain.

== Synopsis ==
Milady is Paulina Zumo, a haughty Imperial Colonel and countess of the Zumo dynasty. Her stories, set in 3000 AD, are a science fiction mixture of many influences: these include Old Chinese costumes, Italian Renaissance intrigues, and hyper-technological environments. Magnus maintained he was also inspired by Alex Raymond's Flash Gordon for the series.

In her adventures, Milady is assisted by Uèr, an electro-chemical android who is desperately in love with her, in spite of Milady's repeated, contemptuous refusals.

== Characters ==
- Milady (Paulina Zumo): A proud, commanding noblewoman and officer of the Galactic Empire.
- Uèr: Her android aide, a tragicomic figure devoted to Milady.

== Publication history ==
The series originally appeared in:

- Il Principe dell’Equilibrio e della Quiete Galattica – Il Mago #94–96 (Jan–Mar 1980)
- Nel Palazzo di Kê and Intermezzo sul Proteo – Il Mago #105 (Dec 1980)
- Gran Condè and Lord Black – Eureka #248 (Feb 1984)

Colored versions of the first three stories were published in France in Métal Hurlant #55, #61bis, and #65, though Magnus objected to the colorization and later re-colored one of the episodes himself for a deluxe Italian edition.

== Reprints and editions ==
- A deluxe edition was published by Glittering Images in 1985.
- Glénat Italia released a color hardcover in 1988.
- A black-and-white paperback came out in 1992 from Granata Press.
- In 2002, Flashbook published a complete volume.
- In 2009, Rizzoli Lizard included the comic in its anthology Erotico e fantastico.

== Art and style ==
The series is noted for Magnus’s precise linework and visual fusion of classical Chinese motifs with futuristic sci-fi aesthetics. Critics and collectors have praised its elaborate costume design, luxurious page layouts, and sensual overtones.

== Critical reception ==
Though not widely reviewed in mainstream English-language sources, Milady 3000 is considered a cult classic in Italy and among comic collectors. The series is often recognized for its genre-blending ambition and daring eroticism. Original art pages have been featured in auctions and exhibitions.

== Legacy ==
Milady 3000 is considered one of Magnus’s final experimental works before he shifted to more realist projects. It stands alongside Lo Sconosciuto and Necron as a testament to his versatility.
