= LuckyBooks =

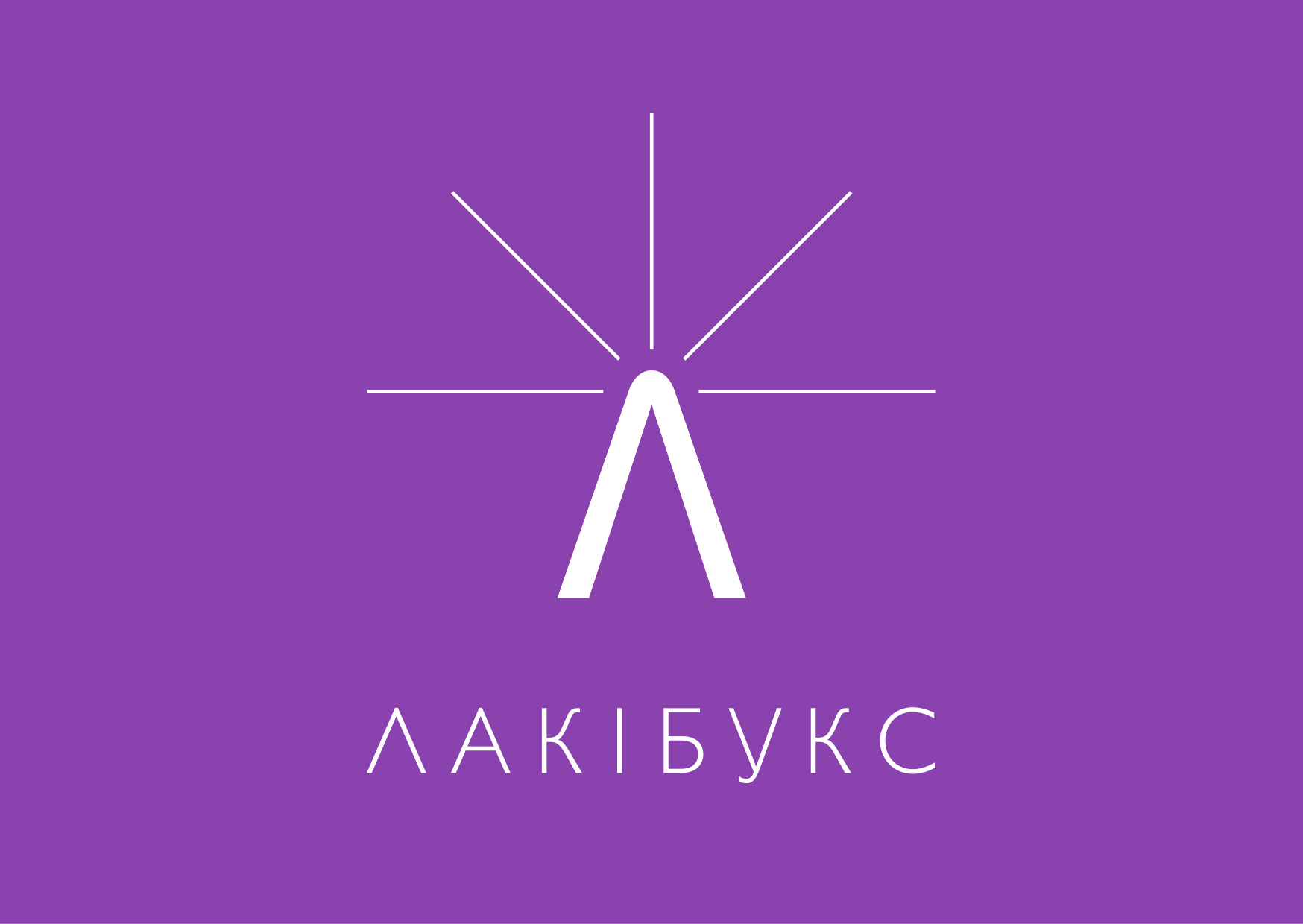
- Formation: May 2017
- Type: Charity initiative
- Purpose: Publish and distribute popular science books for teens in Ukrainian language
- Headquarters: Ukraine
- Founders: Sergei Tokarev, Rustam Gilfanov
- Parent organization: Lucky Labs
- Website: luckybooks.org

LuckyBooks is a charity initiative that publishes and freely distributes popular science books for teens in the Ukrainian language in libraries all over Ukraine. Over the years of its existence, more than 5,000 project's books were transported into 144 libraries in Luhansk, Dnipropetrovsk, Kharkiv, Donetsk, Zaporizhzhia, Kherson and Odesa oblasts.

== Idea and history of the project ==
The project was created in May 2017 by Sergei Tokarev and Rustam Gilfanov, founders of the IT company Lucky Labs, in partnership with the charity fund "I am Future of Ukraine". The purpose of project's activity is intellectual Ukrainianization of adolescents through the distribution of popular science literature about the modern world.

== Project books ==
During the project's existence, six books have been published.

- Book about Garbage Author: Galyna Tkachuk, illustrator: Anton Selleshiy, Stary Lev publishing house – the book informs the reader about reasons why waste is so dangerous and what benefits can be obtained from it, where it appears from and why there is so much garbage, where it goes from garbage tanks, how ecologists and artists around the world struggle with the problem of contamination of the planet, as well as Ukrainian activists and even teens. The book was written in co-authorship with adolescents who participated in a series of environmental workshops held by LuckyBooks.
- #WHATISMATH Author: Kuzko Kuzyakin, illustrator: Kuzko Kuzyakin, Talent publishing house – The author has collected a lot of curious mathematical and historical facts that slightly raise the veil over mysterious issue of what is math. The book will be interesting not only for children of 7th grade, but also for parents.
- Girling Up: How to Be Strong, Smart and Spectacular Author: Mayim Bialik, illustrator: Siobhán Gallagher, Osnovy Publishing – Mayim Bialik is best known for the role of Dr. Amy Farrah Fowler in American sitcom The Big Bang Theory. In addition to this, she is a doctor of neurology and author of several books. In Girling Up, she views the topic of adulthood from two angles: from purely personal one and from the scientific, primarily biological.
- A Brief History of Technology, or How to Understand Your Gadget Author: Andriy Tuzhykov, illustrator: Natalka Soiko, Black Sheep publishing house – With a help of this book one will understand how this "magic" works in a smartphone. In this book, the reader will go all the way of technologies development – from Morse code and radio waves to a modern smartphone in a pocket that has enough power to control several space missions.
- Summer in the DNA length Author: Alina Shtefan, illustrator: Anna Ivanenko, Ranok publishing house – The main characters of the story are teens that are enthusiastic about biotechnology and are eager to tell everyone around about it. However, this storyline of the book serves only as a framework for the very presentation of biological information. It turns out a mosaic of interesting facts about modern biotechnologies.
- Tesla and the machine on space energy Author: Luca Novelli, illustrator: Luca Novelli, K. I. C. publishing house – Inventor and altruist Nikola Tesla is creator of many pieces of technology. He invented alternating current and electric motors, radio transmitting and remote control. After a series of useful inventions, Tesla directed his efforts to research a system capable of providing the entire planet with an inexhaustible source of environmentally friendly and absolutely free energy. This is a book about his life. The history of his victories, defeats and incredible inventions.

Black Sheep publishing house is to publish a book by Japanese author Masao Morita, A mathematician who turned into an ant, which will continue the mathematical theme of the project.

Another publication should be noted separately. Although was not included in the list of project books, LuckyBooks acted as a partner in preparation of the book:

- Same or different? Genomics Authors: Francisco Xavier Soberón Mainero, Monica Bergna, illustrator: María Elena Valdez, Stary Lev publishing house – The book tells the readers about DNA, genome and genes. These are exactly about what make us unique, but at the same time these are our "cellular Esperanto" common not only for people, but for other living creatures. What exactly makes us so different and similar at the same time? This book explains everything.

== Project events ==
The project team held 8 independent presentations of project books in various cities of Ukraine – Kyiv, Zaporizhzhia, Kostyantynivka, Slavske, Mariupol, Kharkiv, Slovyansk, Svyatogirsk and Severodonetsk.

The project also participated in large-scale national cultural events. In May 2017, the members of the Expert Council of the project – the singer and educator Oleg Skrypka, the president of the Association of Practical Psychologists Yevhen Miroshnychenko, and representatives of the IT company Lucky Labs and the charity fund "I am Future of Ukraine" announced the launch of LuckyBooks project. LuckyBooks presented the first project book on Book Forum Lviv. It was “Tesla and the machine on space energy” by Luca Novellli. In the same year, the project took part in the Odesa International Korneichuk Festival of Children's Literature and the Kyiv Youthday Festival '17. In 2018, the project took part in the Children's Forum in Lviv, Kyiv ComicCon festival, the International Children's Literature Festival in Chernivtsi, the Air GogolFest in Vinnitsa and the Lviv Book Forum. In 2018, LuckyBooks was the general partner of the children's program of the Book Arsenal Festival. Together with the Book Arsenal “New Cave Media” held a virtual reality project "Meeting tukoni" on the illustration of Ukrainian artist Oksana Bula sponsored by Sergei Tokarev and Rustam Gilfanov. The project was presented at the Book Arsenal and 70 book exhibitions in the German city of Frankfurt am Main. In December, LuckyBooks opened an updated library for children named on behalf of Valia Kotik in Podil in Kyiv and created an educational corner in it in cooperation with the Library of the Future project. In 2019, LuckyBooks presented the “Book about Garbage" by Galyna Tkachuk at the Children's Forum in Lviv. After that, the book was presented at the Book Arsenal in 2019. Then the books author, Galyna Tkachuk, went on tour with the book presentation, around cities of Ukraine: Vinnytsia, Kharkiv, Zaporizhzhia, Dnipro, Kyiv

== Achievements of the project ==
- Three project books are on the public procurement list for libraries. #WHATISMATH by Kuzko Kuzyakin, Tesla and the machine on space energy by Luca Novelly, A Brief History of Technology, or How to Understand Your Gadget by Andriy Tuzhykov are among 741 books that were bought for public libraries in 2018.
- LuckyBooks received a special award "For the Popularization of Science among Adolescents" in the annual top of the BaraBuka portal for 2018.
- The book #WHATISMATH by Kuzko Kuzyakin received the award of the All-Ukrainian rating "The Book of the Year 2018" in the category Educational and Developing Book, and hit the shortlist of the contest "The Best Book Design".
