= Barletta (disambiguation) =

Barletta is a town and former Metropolitan see in Apulia in south-eastern Italy.

Barletta can also refer to:

== People ==
- Amadeo Barletta Barletta (1894–1975), Italian entrepreneur
- Angelo Barletta (born 1977), German footballer
- Barbara Barletta (1952–2015), American archaeologist
- Chrystian Barletta (born 2001), Brazilian footballer
- Gabriel Barletta (fl. 15th century), Italian Catholic preacher
- Giovanni Pipino da Barletta (died 1316), Italian notary
- Heraclio Barletta (1915–1959), Panamanian politician
- Lou Barletta (born 1956), Italian-American politician
- Mario Barletta (born 1953), Argentine politician
- Niels Barletta, French audio engineer
- Sergio Barletta (born 1934), Italian cartoonist

== Other uses ==
- Italian auxiliary cruiser Barletta, a cargo liner and naval vessel
- Rosso Barletta DOC, a red wine originating from close to the town
