= Gino Gavioli =

Italian comic artist and writer

- Born: 9 May 1923; Milan, Italy
- Died: 19 November 2016 (aged 93)
- Occupation: Comics artist

Gino Gavioli (9 May 1923 – 19 November 2016) was an Italian comic artist, animator and comic writer.

Born in Milan, after graduating from the Brera Academy, Gavioli debuted illustrating some comic series for the publisher Alberto Traini in collaboration with his fellow Paolo Piffarerio. During World War II, he served as a soldier, and he reprised the activity of illustrator only in 1948, drawing the series Nonno Bigio for Edizioni Alpe.

In 1952, Gavioli started collaborating with the magazine Il Monello, and the same year, he co-founded with Piffarerio and his brother Roberto "Gamma Film", a company considered a pioneer in the field of Italian animation, which soon specialized in animation shorts for Carosello. In 1960, he collaborated with Corriere dei Piccoli, also illustrating many covers and taking care of the games column of the magazine, and in 1961, he started a fifty-year-long collaboration with Il Giornalino.

Among Gavioli's best known comics series, Vita da cani (with Tiziano Sclavi as writer), Paco y Monolito, Sempronio, Il Lupo e l'Agnello and Orlando lo strambo, of which he was also author of the stories.
