= Roberto Del Giudice =

Italian voice actor (1940–2007)

- Born: 25 September 1940; Milan, Italy
- Died: 25 November 2007 (aged 67); Rome, Italy
- Occupations: Actor; voice actor; dubbing director
- Years active: 1962–2007

Roberto Del Giudice (25 September 1940 – 25 November 2007) was an Italian actor and voice actor.

== Biography ==
Born in Milan, Del Giudice studied at the Silvio d'Amico National Academy of Dramatic Arts and he began his career in the 1960s mainly working as a television and stage actor. His roles were fairly minor. He then eventually found success as a voice dubber. He was well known for voicing Arsène Lupin III in the Italian version of the Lupin III anime series, and currently has voiced the character longer than any voice actor. He was also famous for providing the Italian voices of Miss Piggy in The Muppets, Zazu in The Lion King film series, Benny in Who Framed Roger Rabbit and Death in Family Guy.

Del Giudice was renowned for dubbing live action characters as well. He dubbed Lee Majors in most of his work, most notably The Six Million Dollar Man as well as Terry Jones in Monty Python's Flying Circus, the character Neelix in Star Trek: Voyager, Snowbell in the last two succeeding Stuart Little films, replacing television presenter Paolo Bonolis, who had dubbed him in the first film.

== Death ==
Del Giudice died in Rome during the evening of 25 November 2007, aged 67, after suffering a long illness. He was buried at the Cimitero Flaminio.

== Filmography ==
- Antonio e Cleopatra - TV play (1965)
- Ed egli si nascose - TV play (1966)
- Le avventure di Laura Storm - TV series, episode 2.3 (1966)
- I fratelli Karamazov - TV miniseries (1969)
- Mercadet l'affarista - TV play (1970)

== Voice work ==
- Alan Ford in Alan Ford e il gruppo TNT contro Superciuk - animated film (1981)
- Pimgio in Tentacolino - animated film (2004)

=== Dubbing roles ===
==== Animation ====
- Arsène Lupin III in Lupin III (1979-2007)
- Miss Piggy in The Muppet Show (2nd voice), The Muppet Movie, The Great Muppet Caper, Miss Piggy (Emily Cratchit) in The Muppet Christmas Carol, Miss Piggy (Benjamina Gunn) in Muppet Treasure Island, Muppets From Space, It's a Very Merry Muppet Christmas Movie, The Muppets' Wizard of Oz
- Robin the Frog (Tiny Tim Cratchit) in The Muppet Christmas Carol
- Zazu in The Lion King, The Lion King II: Simba's Pride, The Lion King 1½, Timon & Pumbaa, Disney's House of Mouse
- Snowbell in Stuart Little 2, Stuart Little 3: Call of the Wild
- Muscles in Jerry's Cousin
- Loopy De Loop in Loopy De Loop
- Precious Pupp in Precious Pupp
- Dynomutt in Dynomutt, Dog Wonder
- Amon (1st voice) and Hayashi (2nd voice) in Grendizer
- Frodo Baggins in The Lord of the Rings
- Porky Pig in The Bugs Bunny/Road Runner Movie
- Kwicky Koala in The Kwicky Koala Show
- Various characters in SilverHawks
- Benny the Cab in Who Framed Roger Rabbit
- Wally Lama, Andy Lloud Webby and Al 5000 in Animaniacs
- Martin Hacker in Gargoyles
- Death in Family Guy (seasons 1-5)
- Le Quack in Courage the Cowardly Dog (seasons 1-3)
- Nergal in The Grim Adventures of Billy & Mandy (seasons 1-3)

==== Live action ====
- Steve Austin in The Six Million Dollar Man, The Bionic Woman
- Bo Duke in The Dukes of Hazzard (seasons 5-6)
- Heath Barkley in The Big Valley
- Neelix in Star Trek: Voyager
- Corporal Reyes in Zorro (1992 redub)
- Terry Jones's roles in Monty Python's Flying Circus
- Willi Keun in The Devil Strikes at Night
- Frederick Keinszig in The Godfather Part III
- Norman Bates in Psycho IV: The Beginning
- Dr. McClean in Superman III
- Almanzo Wilder in Little House on the Prairie
- Mike Yanagita in Fargo
- Wally Thurman in He Said, She Said
- Leo Franks in 52 Pick-Up
- Ed Couch in Fried Green Tomatoes
- Lucky Leadbetter in Up at the Villa
- Gwildor in Masters of the Universe
- Sonny Crawford in The Last Picture Show, in Texasville
- Pee-wee Herman in Big Top Pee-wee
- Murray in Torch Song Trilogy

==== Video games ====
- Arsène Lupin III in Lupin the 3rd: Treasure of the Sorcerer King, in Lupin the Third: Lupin is Dead, Zenigata is in Love
