= Quadratino =

Italian comic strip series

Publication information
- Format: Text comics
- Genre: Humor/comedy

Creative team
- Created by: Antonio Rubino

Quadratino is an Italian comic strip series created by Antonio Rubino.

== Background ==
Quadratino was published by the children magazine Il Corriere dei Piccoli from 1910 to 1911. An early version of the character had previously appeared in 1909, in the same magazine, in the story La tragica istoria del triangolo e del quadrato.

It depicts the surreal stories of the naughty Quadratino ("Little Square"), his grandmother Nonna Matematica ("Grandma Maths") and the tutor Trigonometria ("Trigonometry"); in every episode the titular character is punished for his bad behaviour with the transformation of his head in a rectangle, a triangle or in another geometric shape; at the end of the story, after he understood his faults, the head returns to normal.
