= Cattivik =

Italian comic book character

Cattivik was created by Bonvicini who later passed the character to Guido Silvestri (Silver) as a gift.

Cattivik is an Italian humoristic comic book character created by Bonvi (Franco Bonvicini). "Cattivo" in Italian means evil, nasty, but more on the mean, petty side.

The character first appeared in 1965. He later appeared in the magazine Tiramolla on 19 July 1970. Later, the development of the character was given to one of his assistants, Silver (creator of Lupo Alberto, another successful comic strip in Italy), because Bonvi was too busy with his other works (among them, the famous Sturmtruppen). The character is a more or less declared parody of another successful series in Italy, Diabolik, created by the Giussani Sisters. The character quickly became popular in Italy, his anti-heroic nature is overblown to grotesque proportions (he is a burglar and general criminal, lives in sewers, takes showers with toxic waste and hates everything "good natured") and politically incorrect humour (fart and burp jokes, italian politicians caricatures and social commentary).

The two main characteristics of Cattivik are the pear-shaped form (which is an evolution of the original form designed by Bonvi, which was shaped more like a giant pepperoni) and an accent (he omits the final vowels of most words) that could be both Northern-Italian or Apulian.

The original Cattivik magazine magazine ran in Italy from October 1989 to October 2003, initially published by Acme and subsequently by Macchia Nera and MCK. MCK launched a new series in October 2009, restarting the numbering at issue 1. In 2025, Gigaciao published Cattivik - La Novell’ Grafik’, written by Lorenzo La Neve and illustrated by Spugna under Silver's supervision.

== In other media ==
- Cattivik a video game based on the character was released by Idea Software in 1992.
- The character also has been adapted in a CGI animated TV series in 2008.
- The character has also a collectible figure.
- "Cattivik" is also a video game for the ZX Spectrum By Gabriele Amore and Alessandro Grussu.
