= Italino =

- Kartoffel Otto and Italino

Publication information
- Format: Text comics
- Genre: Humor/comedy
- Publication date: 1915-1919.

Creative team
- Created by: Antonio Rubino

Italino was an Italian comic strip series created by Antonio Rubino.

Italino was published by the children magazine Il Corriere dei Piccoli from 1915, on the eve of the entry of Italy in World War, to 1919. It depicts the patriotic and humorous stories of Italino, an interventionist young Trentino farmer who enjoys doing spites to his Austro-Hungarian rival Kartoffel Otto.
