= A Couple of Guys =

Comic strip

Eric (left) and Joey (right)

A Couple of Guys was a comic strip about the lives of a gay male couple, their friends and family in New York City. The strip was first published in September 1996 and was written and drawn by Dave Brousseau. The strip ended in February 2018 because of high production costs and Brousseu's wishes.

== History ==
The strip was first published in the now-defunct Weekly News, a gay newspaper in Miami, Florida, in September 1996. It was syndicated in June 1996 and was published in newspapers across the United States. and on several websites.

Brousseau said that two of the characters, Eric's sister and brother-in-law, first appeared in a comic strip he drew in college. Mary Ann Parker and Marty Dinkleman were supporting characters in Guy Average, Average Guy, which also appeared in the Xavier University Newswire. However, the later Marty was somewhat different from the previous incarnation in that the college version was never openly homophobic, had curly hair, and was not a native New Yorker.

== Cast ==
=== Main characters ===
- Eric Parker: An actor and waiter originally from Columbus, Ohio. Eric is basically a good person, but can be at times overly-sensitive and quick-tempered. He has an active imagination, and sometimes launches into elaborate daydreams.
- Joey Romelli: A New York City police officer and the boyfriend of Eric. Joey is much more practical and even-tempered than Eric, and often tries to convince his boyfriend to see things from other people's point of view. Joey has one sister, Gina, who lives in New York, and two brothers, Vincent and Anthony, who live elsewhere.
- Sue Fletcher: Eric and Joey's neighbor in their apartment building. She is an English professor at New York University and is known for using stilted language. She is a bit of an intellectual snob and tends to patronize others, particularly Eric.
- Simone Curtis: Sue's live-in girlfriend. A native of Washington, D.C., Simone is a sculptor and ceramist, and is known for her sarcastic quick wit.
- Andy Parker: Eric's bisexual, punk-rock musician brother who lives in Columbus. Andy is a stereotypical slacker and player. In 2008, he was recruited by the fictional ex-gay group P.R.E.Y. (Positive Relationships Enrich You), but later left the group and returned to his old ways, more or less.
- David Gersh: A friend of Joey and Eric. A hairstylist who closed his previous salon, David's Coiffeteria, and opened the day spa Eden.
- Miguel Martinez: David's ex-boyfriend, an attorney. After about twelve years together, they broke up in the summer of 2010 because Miguel was feeling neglected by David.
- Matisse: David's pet, a gay Jack Russell Terrier.
- Jake: One of the puppies born after Matisse accidentally mated with another Jack Russell Terrier in Central Park, believing it to be a male. Jake was later adopted by David. He identifies as straight, and is sometimes frustrated about living in a gay household.
- Lou and Berta: A married couple. Now retired, Lou is Joey's former police partner.
- Hector Velázquez: a student at Hunter College, previously made homeless after being disowned by his parents for being gay. Hector was later taken in by Lou and Berta and began working as a reporter and editor for The Gay Old Times, a fictional gay newspaper in the strip. He later reconciled with his parents.
- Marty Dinkleman: A somewhat boorish homophobic radio shock jock.
- Mary Ann Dinkleman: Eric's older sister and Marty's wife, who also lives in New York with her family.
- April Dinkleman: The teenage daughter of Mary Ann and Marty.

=== Supporting characters ===
- Sister Gina: Joey's sister, a nun who works at a youth center.
- Desiree Wilson: A hairdresser at David's day spa Eden.
- Carter: David's rival, a loudmouthed day spa owner.
- Al & Mae: The fry cook and waitress, at a diner frequented by the regular cast members.
- Phyllis “Phil” Faversham: Joey's friend, social worker, and active member of the Metropolitan Community Church. She sometimes bemoans her status as a single lesbian. Phil's dog, Gertrude, is a lesbian and a boxer.
- Angel and Devil: Apparitions that occasionally appear to Eric, serving as his conscience and dark side. The two apparently have some sort of a relationship together.
- Tim Krieger: A young bisexual man who was Andy's first boyfriend. Though he and Andy were not in a committed relationship, Tim was frequently jealous when Andy would express interest in other men or women. The nature of their relationship is unclear, but they are frequently seen together.
- Ronnie/Veronica: A cross-dresser, and Andy's one-time romantic interest.
- Ted: The bartender at the Pipeline, a neighborhood bar, until it closed in 2009. He became a bartender at Mars.
- Omar: The owner of Mars, a neighborhood bar frequented by Eric and Joey. He was a regular at the Pipeline, and decided to open a bar of his own after it closed.
- Frank and Joyce Romelli: Joey's parents, who live in St. Petersburg, Florida. Frank is a retired plumber.
- Bill and Lois Parker: Parents of Eric, Mary Ann, and Andy. They live in Columbus, Ohio, and are active in the local PFLAG chapter. Bill is an investment banker.
- Annie O'Malley: Lou's replacement as Joey's police partner. Although married to Charlie, he once confessed an attraction to Joey.
- Matthew Mannheim: A gay porn star and nemesis of Eric. He once dated (and was dumped by) Eric when they were both in college (when he was still known as Bradley Zwinkerhoff). He went on to reinvent himself as a handsome, muscular porn star, and Eric believes that Matthew still harbors ill will toward him. He is never been seen in the strip, but is talked about occasionally.
