= Marmittone =

Italian comic strip

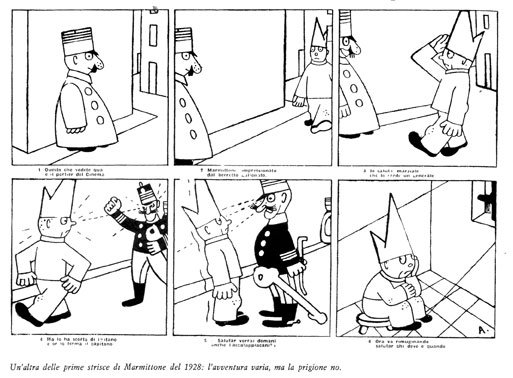

Publication information
- Format: Text comics, military comics
- Genre: Humor/comedy

Creative team
- Created by: Bruno Angoletta

Marmittone is an Italian comic strip series created by Bruno Angoletta.

== Background ==
The name Marmittone ("rookie") is derived from "marmitta", the huge pot in which military rations are cooked. The main character is a simple-minded soldier with goodwill, who, for his gaffes and bad luck, ends up going to prison at the end of each of his adventures. The comic strip was published by Il Corriere dei Piccoli from 1928 to 1940, a few weeks before the outbreak of World War II.

Marmittone is considered a parody of fascist values of militarism and virility and was referred to as "the most consistent and unyieldingly rude antagonist of the soldierly stereotypes of any dictatorship".
