= Il marchio di Kriminal =

1967 film

- Italian film poster
- Directed by: Fernando Cerchio
- Screenplay by: Eduardo Manzanos Brochero
- Starring: Roel Bos; Helga Liné; Andrea Bosic
- Cinematography: Emilio Foriscot; Angelo Lotti
- Edited by: Gianmaria Messeri
- Music by: Piero Umiliani
- Production companies: Filmes Cinematografica; Copercines
- Release date: 1967 (Italy)
- Running time: 92 minutes
- Countries: Italy; Spain

Il marchio di Kriminal (lit. The Mark of Kriminal) is a 1967 film. It is the follow-up to Kriminal (1966).

== Plot ==
The bandit Kriminal accidentally discovers in an ancient porcelain statuette a fragment of a map relating to the place where a famous outlaw, before being executed, had managed to hide two precious canvases. Kriminal immediately begins the research to recover three other statuettes, similar to the one in his possession, containing the fragments necessary to complete the map.

His investigations are successful. Only one statuette is now missing from Kriminal to identify the place where the paintings are hidden. However, the statuette is in the hands of two adventurers, Mara and Robson, who, in turn, try to snatch the map fragments he recovered from Kriminal. An agreement is finally reached by the three: they will join forces to bring to light the hidden paintings and share the proceeds equally.

Kriminal, Mara and Robson then leave for Beirut and, in an archaeological area of the city, they find the precious paintings. Kriminal eliminates the two partners, who had tried to take over the entire booty, and sets out to return to his base. However, the unexpected arrival of Inspector Milton, who has been on his trail for some time, disrupts his plans. In an attempt to escape capture, Kriminal crashes his car into a ravine.

== Production ==
Il marchio di Kriminal is the follow-up to the film Kriminal (1966), directed by Umberto Lenzi. Roel Bos, the main actor of the film states that the film was shot in Rome and on a cruise between Genoa to Beirut, Baalbeck, Byblos and Madrid. The film's credits note that Manuel Parada composed the score, but it is actually the work of Piero Umiliani. Nando Cicero is sometimes credited in aiding Fernando Cerchio in directing the film while Roel Bos states that to his "knowledge Cicero had nothing to do with the movie."

== Release ==
Il marchio di Kriminal was released in Italy in 1967.

== Reception ==
In a contemporary review, Italian newspaper La Stampa gave a brief plot summary of the film, which stated that the plot summary alone indicates the quality of the film.

In a retrospective review, Italian film critic and historian Roberto Curti noted that "despite a disappointing second half, which again transforms the movie into a banal travelogue adventure [...] Il marchio di Kriminal is ultimately more successful than its predecessors in conveying the feeling of Magnus & Bunker's grimly ironic comic book."

== See also ==
- List of Italian films of 1967
- List of Spanish films of 1967
