= Sergio Barletta =

Italian comic artist and animator

- Born: 20 November 1934 (age 90); Bologna, Italy
- Occupation: Cartoonist

Sergio Barletta (born 20 November 1934) is an Italian cartoonist and illustrator.

== Life and career ==
Born in Bologna, Barletta made his debut at very young age for the Saturday insert of the newspaper Gazzetta del Popolo Fuorisacco, and later collaborated with several magazines as an illustrator.

In 1968 he created for the magazine Rinascita the comic strip Mr. Manager, but after the refusal of the magazine to publish it as too much politicized, the strip landed on the magazines Ca Balà and Eureka, to which Barletta also contributed with illustrations and vignettes. Later he collaborated as a satirical cartoonist with Italian and European magazines. For his style has been compared to Jules Feiffer.

Since 1960 Barletta has also been art director of several publications and since 1965 he has been also active as a painter. Starting from 1967 he published several comedy books.
