= Antonio Rubino =

Italian illustrator and cartoonist (1880–1964)

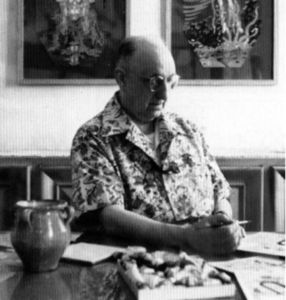
- Born: 15 May 1880; Sanremo, Kingdom of Italy
- Died: 1 July 1964 (aged 84); Bajardo, Italy
- Occupations: Illustrator; Cartoonist

Signature
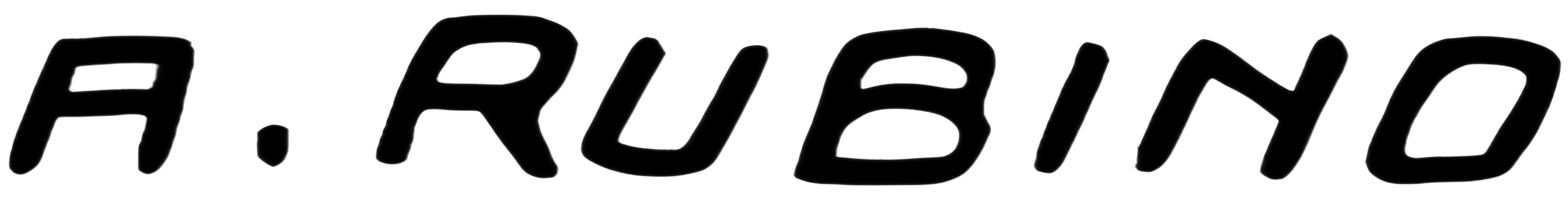

Antonio Rubino (15 May 1880 – 1 July 1964) was an Italian illustrator, cartoonist, animation director, screenwriter, playwright, author and poet. He was the most prolific comics illustrator in Italy before World War I.

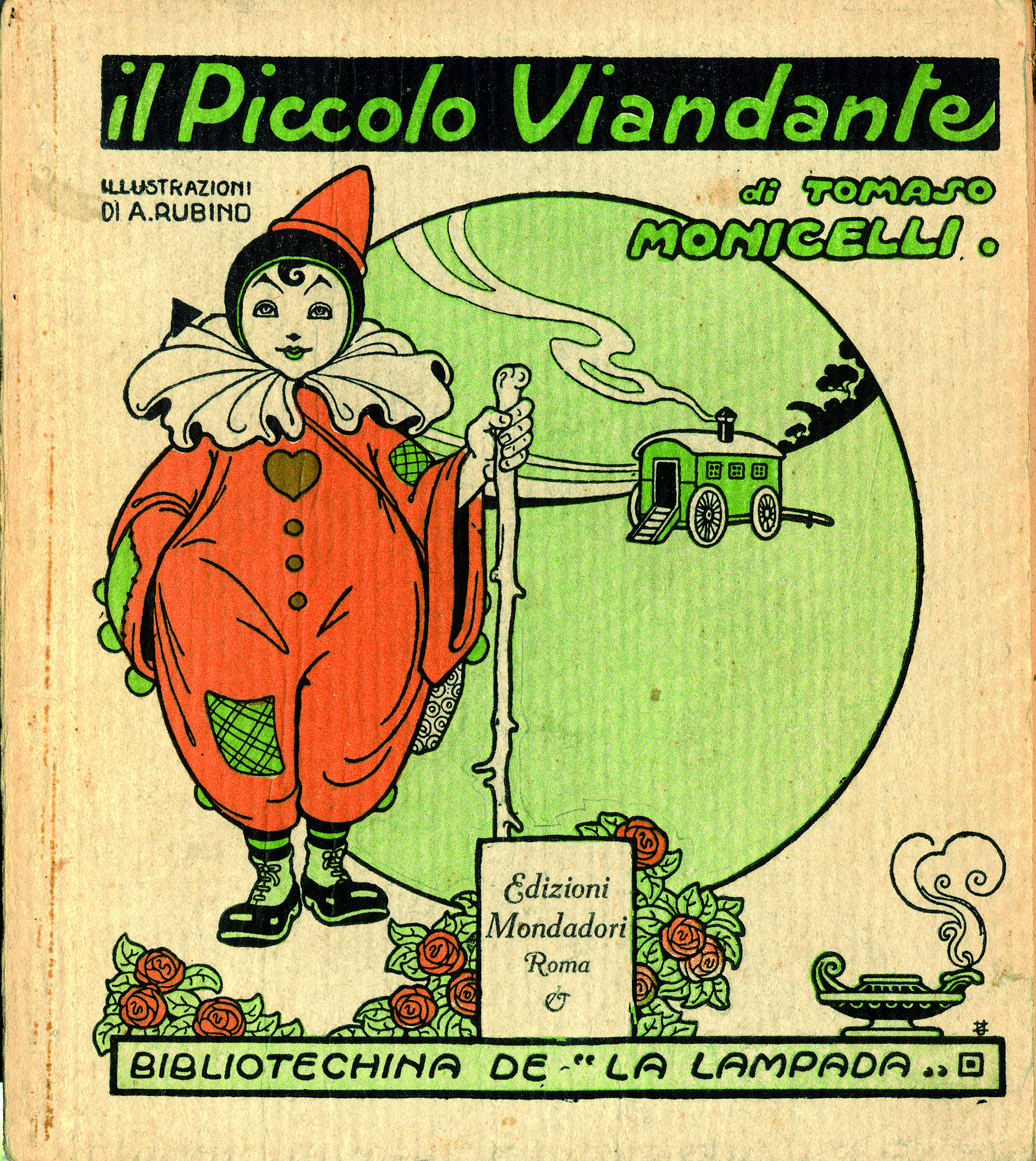
Tomaso Monicelli e Antonio Rubino - The little wayfarer - La Lampada Mondadori 1913

== Biography ==
Born Antonio Augusto Rubino in Sanremo, Rubino graduated in law. Then, as an autodidact, he turned his focus to drawing, debuting as the illustrator of Alberto Colantuoni's book L'Albatros.

After collaborating with several newspapers and magazines, in 1908 he started a collaboration as illustrator and cartoonist with the children's magazine Corriere dei Piccoli, for which he created numerous successful comic characters, notably Quadratino and Italino. In the 1920s and 1930s Rubino was also chief-editor and sometimes founder of several children's publications, such as Il Balilla, Topolino, Mondo Bambino, and Mondo Fanciullo.

He also directed several animated films, debuting in 1942 with Paese dei Ranocchi (The Land of the Frogs), which won the best film award at the Venice Film Festival in the animation category. His film I sette colori (The Seven Colors, released posthumously in 1955), has been described as one of "the most innovative and eclectic films" in the Italian animation field.

The surreal style of Rubino has been variously associated to Futurism, East Asian painting, and above all Art Nouveau.
