= Bruno Angoletta =

Italian illustrator, cartoonist and painter

Bruno Angoletta (7 September 1889 - 7 January 1954) was an Italian illustrator, cartoonist and painter.

Angoletta was born in Belluno, from Orlando, a lawyer, and Francesca Bettio. For some years he studied law in Padua, but later abandoned his studies to entirely focusing into drawing and painting as an autodidact. In the late 1900s, he started a collaboration as an illustrator with the satirical weekly magazine L'Asino, then he moved to Rome, where he also began to collaborate with the magazine La tribuna illustrata.

At the outbreak of the First World War, despite his pericarditis, he volunteered, was wounded and taken prisoner in Bohemia but even performed acts of heroism that earned him two decorations.

In 1921, he founded with Antonio Beltramelli the monthly children magazine Giro Giro Tondo, published by Mondadori.

In January 1928, in the pages of Corriere dei Piccoli, Angoletta started his most successful comic character, the soldier Marmittone, a mild-mannered young soldier who often, due to his mild temperament and not inclined to war, ends up being punished and transferred to the cell. The comic strip was published until 1940.

Other well-known comic characters he created in the period between the two wars were Sor Calogero Sorbara, Ermete Centarbe and Romolino & Romoletto, a couple of twins often glorifying the Fascist victories.
