= Luca Novelli =

Italian cartoonist and writer (born 1947)

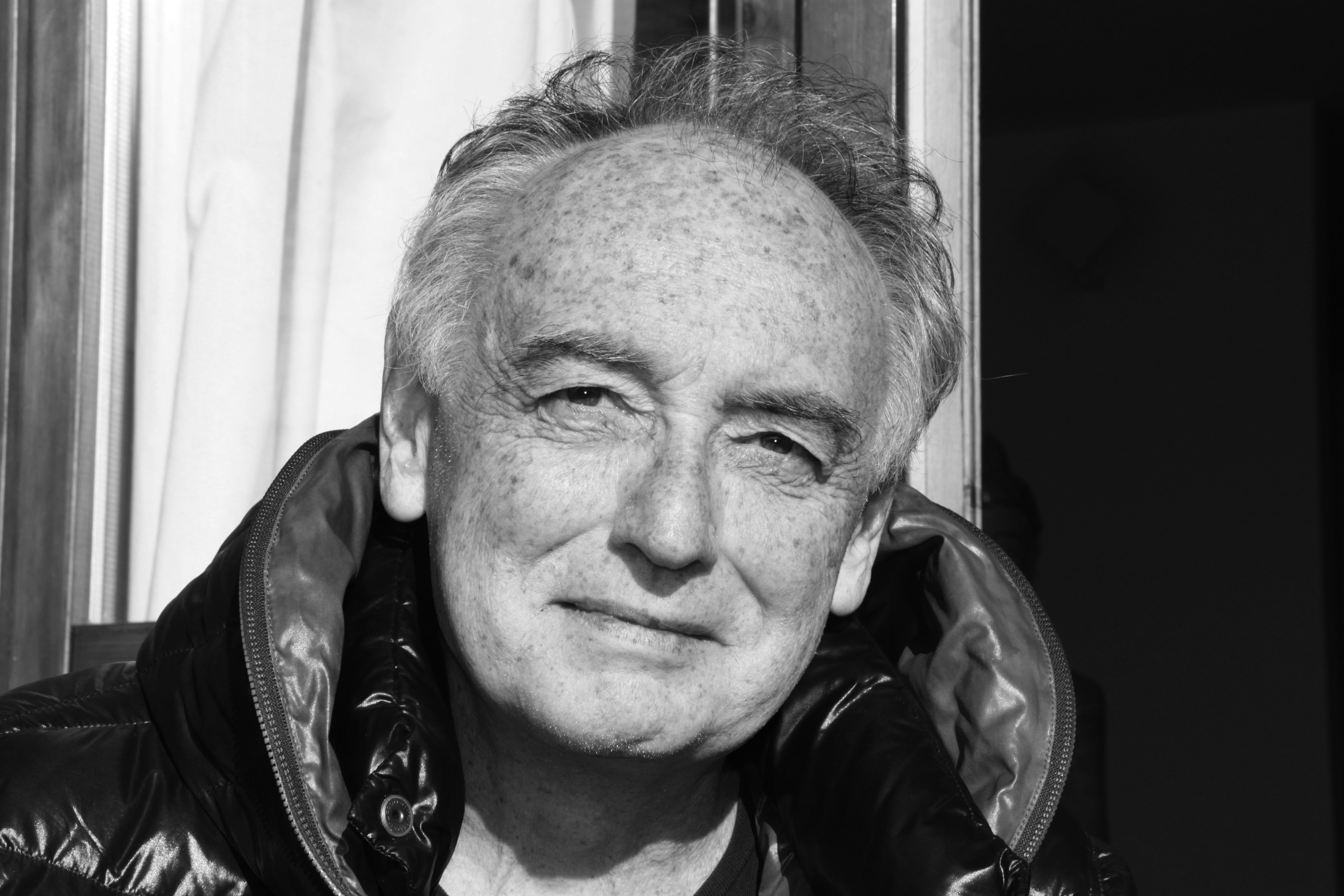
- Born: 7 October 1947 (age 78); Milan, Italy
- Occupations: Cartoonist; Writer

Luca Novelli (born 7 October 1947) is an Italian cartoonist and writer.

Born in Milan, Novelli graduated in agronomy and started drawing his first strips in 1967 for some university publications. He made his professional debut in 1971 with the comics series Historiettes, published in the magazine Eureka, and shortly later he created the successful comic strip Gli Edenisti, published in the newspapers Gazzetta di Parma and Il Messaggero and in the magazine Pardon. In 1974 he created his best-known work, the comic strip Il Laureato, published in the newspapers Il Giorno and Il Messaggero and in the magazine Men Only. In 1976 he started collaborating with the German magazine Pardon.

In 1978, Novelli released Viaggio al centro della cellula, a biology comic textbook, and following its success, he specialized in popular science books for children, published in Italy by Mondadori and often translated in foreign languages.
