= Bilbolbul =

Publication information
- Format: Text comics
- Genre: Humor/comedy
- Publication date: 1908-1933

Creative team
- Created by: Attilio Mussino

Bilbolbul is an Italian comic strip series created by Attilio Mussino.

== Background ==
The comic feature Bilbolbul was published in the children's magazine Il Corriere dei Piccoli from 1908 to 1933. It is commonly considered Italy's first comic. Its main character, Bilbolbul, is an African kid who interprets everything literally—including the most common metaphors and expressions—with bizarre and surreal effects.
