= Silvia Ziche =

Italian comic book artist and writer (born 1967)

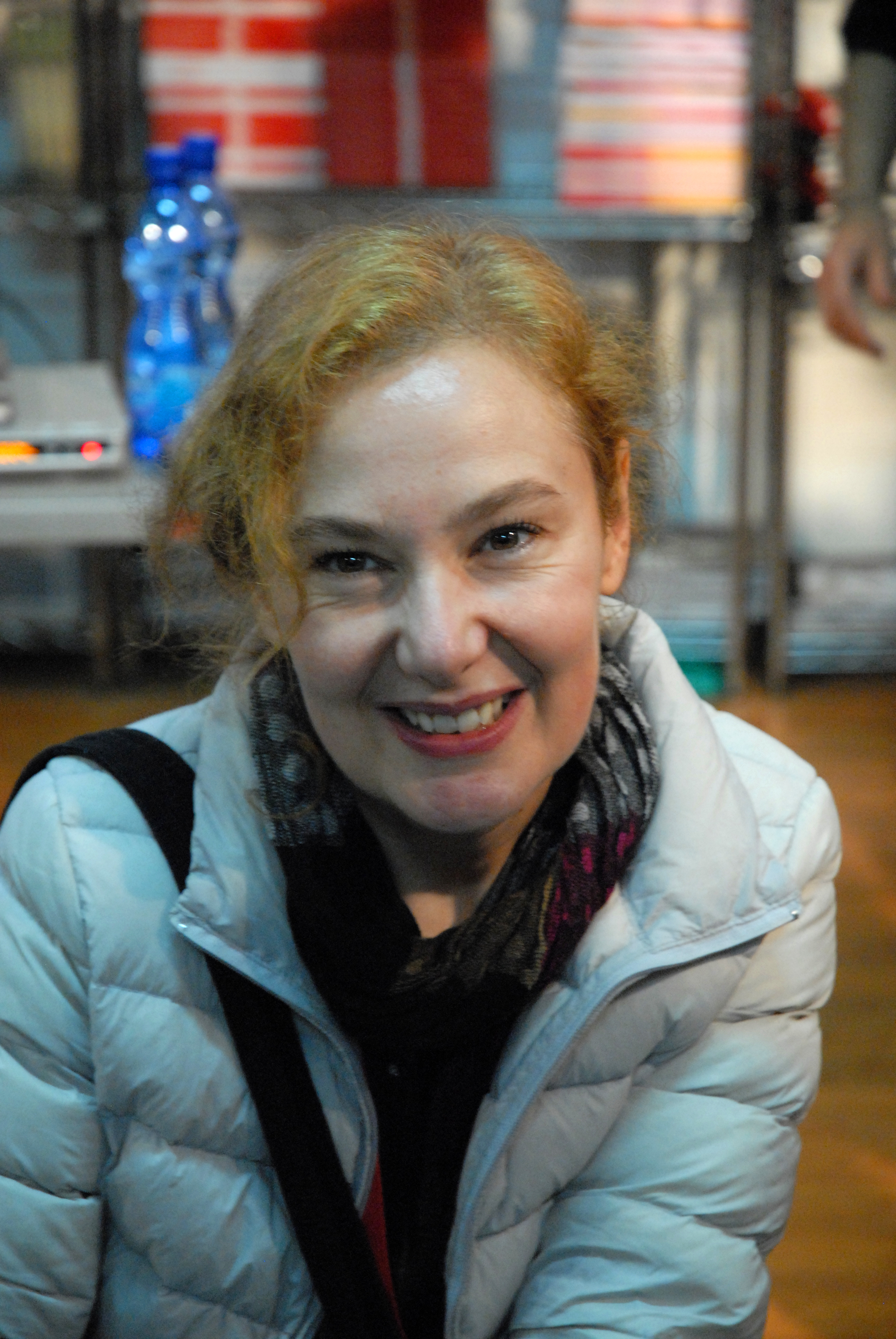
- Ziche at Lucca Comics & Games 2010
- Born: 5 July 1967 (age 59) Thiene, Italy
- Areas: Cartoonist, Writer

Silvia Ziche (Italian: [ˈsilvja dˈdziːke]; born 5 July 1967) is an Italian comic book artist and writer, known for her work in Disney comics for the Italian comic digest Topolino.

== Biography ==
Ziche was born in Thiene. Ziche has also worked on the magazines Linus, Comix and Cuore.

She is known for her long story arcs published during successive issues of Topolino, such as "Paperina di Rivondosa", "Topokolossal", "Il papero del mistero", "Il Grande Splash" and "Papere alla deriva".

== Awards and honours ==
Ziche won the 1997 Lucca Comics' Panther Award for Best Emerging Author and the 1999 Lucca Comics' Panther Award for Best Designer of Humorous Comics.

She was given the U Giancu's Prize at the 2000 International Cartoonists Exhibition.
