= Maxmagnus =

Italian comics series

An Italian Maxmagnus cover depicting Maxmagnus and his "Trustful Administrator".

Maxmagnus is an Italian comics series featuring an eponymous character, created in 1968 by Italian comic book creator Max Bunker and comics artist Magnus, for the magazine Eureka.

== Publication history ==
Maxmagnus was published in 1968–1970 in the form of 4/6-panels short histories, and the issued in a regular series in the 1980s, with art by Leone Cimpellin.

Maxmagnus was also published in French and Croatian.
