= Necron (comics) =

Creative team
- Written by: Ilaria Volpe
- Artist(s): Magnus

Necron is the title character of an Italian horror/adult comics miniseries published between 1981 and 1985.

== Publication history ==
Necron debuted in January 1981, published by editor Edifumetto; the authors, writer Mirka Martini and illustrator Roberto Raviola, signed the comics with the pen names Ilaria Volpe and Magnus. Necron was initially intended to be a single episode, but the publisher convinced the authors to make a whole miniseries. The series closed after 11 episodes in November 1981, then the character returned in a twelfth out of series episode in 1983, and finally in two special issues in June 1985. During the years, the series was republished and several anthologic books were released.

== Plot and style ==
The comic, a sexy-parody of Frankenstein, features the adventures of the nymphomaniac and necrophiliac mad doctor Frieda Boher and of her slave-lover Necron, a strong, well endowed and cannibal humanoid assembled with fragments of corpses.

The series was critically appreciated for its visual style, different from the previous works of Magnus, here characterized for a more clean and elegant pencil mark, so to be paired to the Franco-Belgian ″ligne claire″.
