= Silver (cartoonist) =

Italian comic book artist

Guido Silvestri
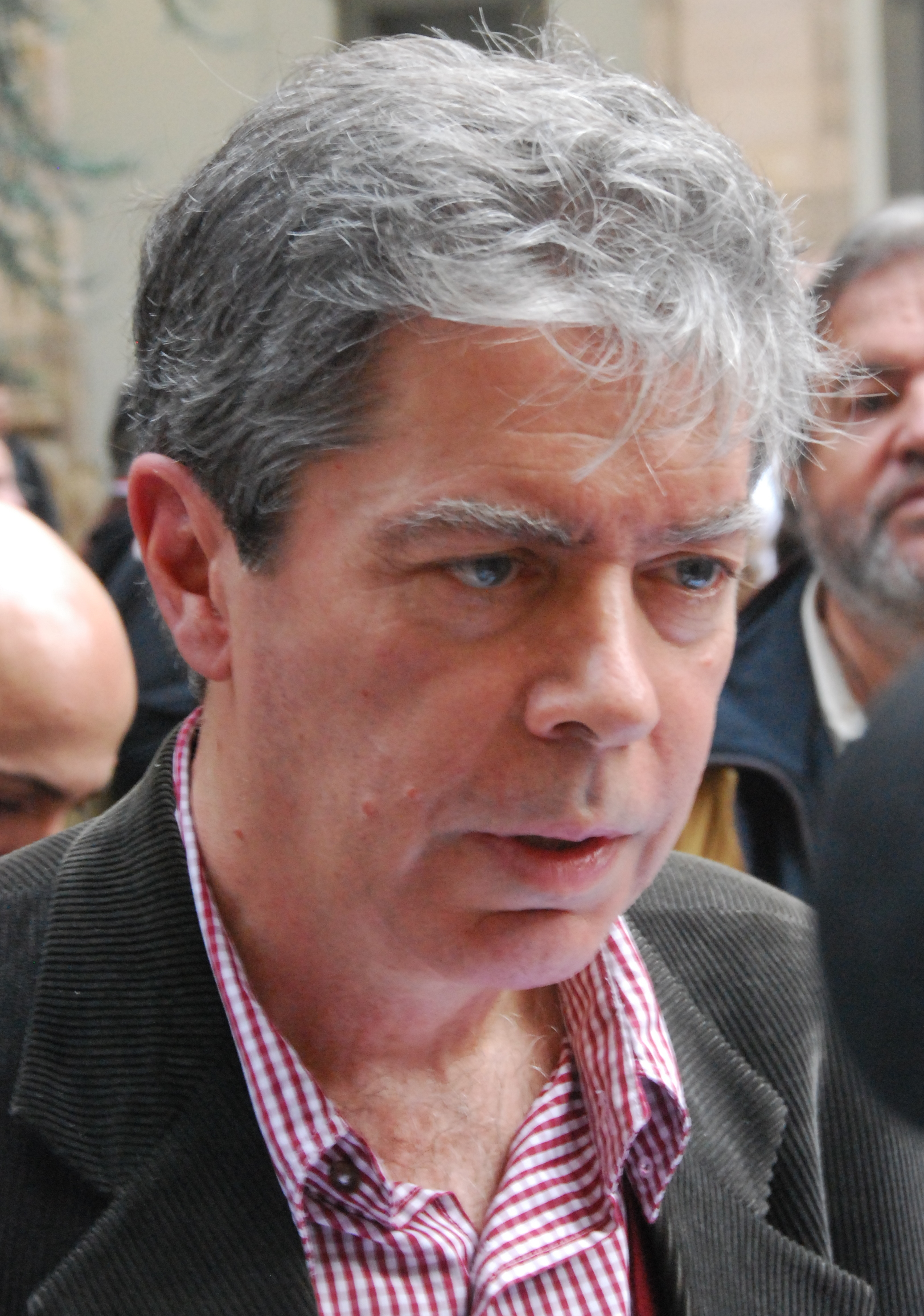
- Silver at Lucca Comics & Games in 2008
- Born: December 9, 1952 (age 73) Carpi, Emilia-Romagna, Italy
- Area: Cartoonist
- Pseudonym: Silver
- Notable works: Lupo Alberto
- Awards: U Giancu's Prize, 1998

Guido Silvestri (born 9 December 1952 in Carpi), known by his pen name Silver, is an Italian comic book creator. Silver began his comics career as an apprentice of Franco Bonvicini (Bonvi). Silver created the series Lupo Alberto, which began in 1974. His early work included contributions to Cattivik, Nick Carter and Capitan Posapiano.
