= Paolo Piffarerio =

Italian comics artist (1924–2015)

- Born: 27 August 1924; Recanati, Italy
- Died: 30 June 2015 (aged 90); Milan, Italy
- Occupation: Comics artist

Paolo Piffarerio (27 August 1924 – 30 June 2015) was an Italian comics artist and animator.

== Biography ==
Born in Recanati, the son of a silversmith and a seamstress, Piffarerio studied at the Brera Academy, where he met Gino Gavioli. In 1953 Gavioli and Piffarerio founded "Gamma Film", a pioneering company in the field of animation in Italy. Piffarerio realized several animation shorts for the TV show Carosello, as well as The Long Green Sock (Italian: La lunga calza verde), a 1961 film about the history of Italy scripted by Cesare Zavattini.

Piffarerio's first comic character, Capitan Falco, was created in 1943. He collaborated with writer Max Bunker on a number of comics series, including Viva l'Italia (1961), Maschera Nera (1963), El Gringo (1965) and Alan Ford, where he pencilled about one hundred issues between 1975 and 1984. Piffarerio also collaborated with journalist and writer Enzo Biagi for his book series La storia d'Italia a fumetti, and was the author of a number of comics adaptations of novels and historical biographies for Il Giornalino.
