= Magnus (comic artist) =

Italian comic book artist (1939–1996)

- Born: Roberto Raviola; May 30, 1939 Bologna, Italy
- Died: February 5, 1996 (aged 56) Castel del Rio, Italy
- Areas: Artist, writer
- Notable works: Alan Ford; Kriminal; Satanik; Lo Sconosciuto; Necron

Magnus, pseudonym of Roberto Raviola (May 30, 1939 – February 5, 1996), was an Italian comic book artist, recognized as one of the greatest Italian cartoonists.

== Biography ==
Born in Bologna in 1939, he studied at Academy of Fine Arts and graduated with a degree in set design.

Having worked as an illustrator, he started his comics career and his association with Max Bunker in 1964 with the series Kriminal. He took the pseudonym Magnus, from the Latin phrase Magnus Pictor Fecit ("A Great Painter Did It"). During the 1960s the duo became a mainstay of Italian comics creating successful series such as Kriminal and Satanik (1964), Dennis Cobb, Gesebel (1966, only first six stories by Magnus) and Maxmagnus (1968). Magnus' atmospheric use of black and white was instrumental in launching a new comics genre, called fumetti neri (black comics/adult comics).

In 1967 Magnus & Bunker started working on a new series resulting in the May 1969 release of the humorous Alan Ford.

After leaving Alan Ford in 1975, Magnus began an association with Renzo Barbieri's publishing house, which specialized in the erotic comics genre. In the 1970s works like Midnight of Fire, Ten Knights and a Wizard, Vendetta Macumba and The Living Skull came out. Magnus continued creating the long saga The Outlaws and in 1975 he started the Lo Sconosciuto (a character whose lastname is Unknow, intentional misspelling of "Unknown") series, today considered one of Magnus' finest creations. In 1977 The Company of the Gallows series appeared.

During the 1980s he created two science fictional heroines: Milady 3000 (1980–1984) and Necron's Frieda Boher, written by Ilaria Volpe. Milady, translated also in France on Metal Hurlant magazine, is a science fiction series where Chinese culture, Flash Gordon and Star Wars' influences, erotism and technology are well mixed.

Magnus briefly returned to Alan Ford in 1986, to draw the 200th episode.

Subsequently, inspired by eastern literature, he created The 110 pills, Fiori di prugno in un vaso d'oro and The Enchanted Women. In 1989 Magnus began his last work, a long story featuring the popular Italian western character Tex, written by Claudio Nizzi: for it Magnus completed 223 exceedingly detailed plates in 7 years of work, for which he used original sources for any historical element, and studied from live any natural detail such as leaves, light and trees. In August 1991 Magnus had moved to Castel del Rio, near Bologna, where he spent his last years and died of pancreatic cancer just a few days after completing his Tex story.

== Bibliography ==
- Il vendicatore ("The Avenger", 1958)
- Il dottor Kastner (1961)
- Kriminal (1964)
- Satanik (1964)
- Gesebel (1966)
- Dennis Cobb Agente SS018 (1966)
- Maxmagnus (1968)
- Alan Ford (1969–1975, 1986)
- Mezzanotte di morte ("Midnight of Death", 1975)
- Dieci cavalieri e un mago ("Ten Knights and a Wizard", 1975)
- Quella sera al collegio femminile ("That night in the female college", 1975)
- Il teschio vivente ("The Living Skull", 1975)
- Lo Sconosciuto ("The Unknown", 1975)
- La Compagnia della Forca ("The Company of the Gallows", 1977)
- I Briganti (1973–1978)
- Vendetta Macumba (1979)
- Milady nel 3000 (1980)
- Necron (1981)
- Il sogno dello scroscio di pioggia ("The dream of the rain pelt", 1984)
- Le 110 pillole ("110 pills", 1985)
- Le femmine incantate ("The Enchanted Women", 1987)
- Tex Willer Special #9: La Valle del Terrore (1996)
