= Lupo Alberto =

Italian comic strip

- A new version of the comic book published in 2008

Publication information
- Publisher: Mck Publishing
- Format: 21,5 cm × 14,5 cm
- Genre: Comedy
- Publication date: February 1974

Creative team
- Written by: Silver

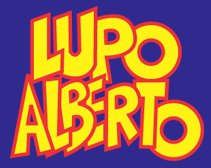
Lupo Alberto the original logo

Lupo Alberto ("Alberto the Wolf") is an Italian comic book series created by Guido Silvestri (Silver) in 1974. It details the adventures of Lupo Alberto, a blue wolf. Lupo Alberto takes the shape of the common man who has a goal in life and a certain amount of bad luck. Alberto, a resident of the McKenzie farm, always tries to steal a hen named Martha (who is his girlfriend), but Moses, a sheepdog, is the obstacle to his plans and does everything to stop him. The conflicts between Alberto and Moses were the subject of the first strips of the series.

Lupo Alberto made its first appearance in February 1974, with some strips published by Silvestri in Corriere dei Ragazzi, a 1970s magazine owned by Corriere della Sera. After a year, Dardo published the first series dedicated to this character. A short-lived series (composed of 8 issues) has been released between 1983 and 1984. A new periodical began publication in 1985; initially monthly, it changed to an every other month schedule in August 2020. In 2009 an exhibition for the character's 35th anniversary was held. In February/March 2022, issue 431 introduced Tutto un altro Lupo, a sixteen-page section curated by Lorenzo La Neve featuring independent cartoonists' reinterpretations of the characters.

The Lupo Alberto strips are especially popular among teenagers, and have spawned a rich merchandising franchise including school diaries and greeting cards. As a consequence of its appeal on the youth, the Lupo Alberto character was used in the 1990s for a massive anti-AIDS campaign promoted by the Italian Ministry of Public Health, emphasizing safe sex and the use of condoms.

== Characters ==
- Lupo Alberto - A blue wolf who is a resident of the McKenzie farm, Alberto pursues his relationship with Martha
- Martha (Marta) - A hen who is Alberto's girlfriend
- Moses (Mosè) - A sheepdog who is the obstacle to Alberto's plans
- Henry (Enrico) - A mole
- Esther (Cesira) - Henry's wife, a mole
- Alfred (Alfredo) - A turkey
- Ludwig (Lodovico) - A horse
- Einstein (Odoardo) - Einstein is Martha's cousin
- Joseph - A duck who has the nickname "Glycerin" ("Glicerina")
- Krug - A bull
- Omar - A rooster
- Silvietta - A sparrow
- Kant (Alcide) - A philosopher pig
- Alice - Martha's friend, a hen
- Relader - a dog who is a friend to Alberto

== Animated series ==
In 1997, Rai Trade (1987–2011) and Mondo TV co-produced an animated series and label for Warner Bros. The series is available in Italian and English.

== Video game ==
A video game adaptation of the comic strip was released for the Commodore 64, Amiga and Atari ST.
