= Kriminal =

Italian comic book series

Publication information
- Publisher: Editoriale Corno
- Format: Ongoing series
- Publication date: 1964–1974
- No. of issues: 419

Creative team
- Created by: Magnus, Max Bunker
- Written by: Max Bunker
- Artist: Magnus

Semi-nude girls were an absolute novelty for Italian comics in the 1960s and caused scandal.

Kriminal is an Italian comics series featuring an eponymous fictional character, created in 1964 by Magnus and Max Bunker, the authors of Alan Ford, Maxmagnus and Satanik.

== Characters ==
Kriminal is an English master thief, Anthony Logan, who dresses in black and yellow costume with a fearsome skull face for his adventures. The character was directly inspired by the contemporary (and more successful) Diabolik, with whom he shares the ability to use masks that allow him to assume any identity. In the earliest adventures, Kriminal was a near sadistic killer fighting for revenge against the criminals who had pushed his father to commit suicide. Having also lost his mother and sister, Logan spent his youth in a reformatory, from which he managed to escape, intent to pursue vengeance.

Kriminal has a female companion, Lola Hudson whom he married and with whom he had a child, Max. He also has a love-hate relationship with Gloria, who was once the wife of Scotland Yard Inspector Patrick Milton, his main enemy. Gradually over time, Kriminal's most extreme villainous features were toned down, and in the later stories he assumed more positive and heroic connotations.

The series was one of the first to employ continuity in Italian comic books, as any new story would begin exactly at the point the previous had ended, and the characters' lives continually evolved (in contrast to Diabolik). Logan himself married and had a child, who soon died.

The series ended in November 1974, after 419 episodes.

== Censorship ==
Due to the violence and the proto-erotic scenes in the comic book (as well as in Satanik), Bunker and Raviola had problems with Italian censorship. Bunker was prosecuted several times, but never condemned. The panels depicting semi-nude girls were often censored by the publisher itself.

== Crossovers ==
In the episode #90, "Quello che non ti aspetti", Kriminal meets Satanik: this is the first example of crossover in Italian comics. The character is also featured in Alan Ford #150, also by Magnus & Bunker.

== Cinema ==
Kriminal has been adapted for the big screen several times. The first film, simply titled Kriminal, was released in 1966 by Umberto Lenzi, starring Dutch actor Glenn Saxson in the lead role. The skeleton costume was slightly altered. A sequel, Il marchio di Kriminal ("The Mark of Kriminal") directed by Fernando Cerchio, followed in the summer of 1968
