= Satanik =

Italian comic book series

- Satanik issue 50 - "The descent of the Vampires". Satanik is depicted as a blonde woman in this instance.

Publication information
- Publisher: Editoriale Corno
- Format: Ongoing series
- Publication date: 1964–1974
- No. of issues: 231

Creative team
- Written by: Max Bunker
- Artist: Magnus

Satanik is an Italian crime comics series created in December 1964 by Max Bunker (writer) and Magnus (artist), also the authors of the popular series Kriminal and Alan Ford.

== Synopsis ==
Satanik is Marny Bannister, a skilled female chemist whose face is marked by an unpleasant angioma. One day, following a theory of a mad alchemist, she develops a drug which transforms her into a charming and fascinating red-haired (occasionally blonde) woman: but, as in Stevenson's The Strange Case of Dr. Jekyll and Mr. Hyde, the drug has an unexpected side effect, making her a murderous criminal mastermind. Satanik was innovative in that she took advantage of her sex appeal to conduct her crimes, with some proto-erotic scenes appearing in the series. It showed also a broad range of horror and supernatural themes like vampires, evil ghosts, and monsters. The series had several problems with censorship and some of the books were confiscated by authorities (like "Murder in the correction house").

Lieutenant Trent, Satanik's main opponent.

The main antagonist of Satanik is the policeman Lt. Trent, whose companion Satanik had killed. After a ménage with the jewel trader Max Lincoln (#38-100), in the last numbers she gets engaged to Kriss Hunter, a black private detective. One of the villains of the series, the vampire Baron Wurdalak, later also appeared in the comedic-oriented series Alan Ford.

== Publication history ==
The comic book, in black and white digest format, was published for ten years. Magnus left after Issue 160. Other artists who worked on the series include Giovanni Romanini and Franco Verola. The last Satanik comic book was Issue 231 of October 1974, in which Satanik and her boyfriend seem to drown. Satanik was named Demoniak in France, in order to avoid confusion with Killing, which had been translated in French as Satanik.

In 1968 Satanik was adapted into a film directed by Piero Vivarelli, starring Magda Konopka in the main role.
