= Alan Ford (comics) =

Italian comic book

- Alan Ford issue #1 (1969)
- Story: Max Bunker
- Ink: Magnus
- Date: 1969
- Pages: 120
- Layout: 2 images per page

Alan Ford is an Italian comic book created by Max Bunker (Luciano Secchi) and Magnus (Roberto Raviola), in print since 1969. The comic book is a satirical take on classic secret agents laden with surreal and black humour, and sardonic references to aspects of the contemporary Italian and Western society.

Although it became widely popular in Italy shortly after its introduction, Alan Ford remained relatively unknown outside Italy. The French, Danish and Brazilian editions soon failed but the only other foreign edition, in SFR Yugoslavia, was a huge success, becoming and remaining one of the most popular comic books in the former country and its successors.

Although the initial plot in the first few episodes develops around an agent called Alan Ford, he is later just one of the central group of characters: Group TNT is an assembly of misfit secret agents, who operate from a flower shop in New York City, United States, which they use as a front for their secret headquarters. They are incompetent and lazy, yet intelligent and cunning, especially when it suits their own personal interests. Their outlandish biographies are dwarfed by that of their iron-fisted and shrewd leader, Number One, a Methusalem character who embezzles the millions paid to the group by American government or city fathers for secret missions, while paying a pittance to his agents.

The comic book ridicules aspects of American society, as well as making direct references to local Italian reality, whose social ills were often satirized by Magnus & Bunker, as well as terms in Milanese dialect.

== Editions ==
Alan Ford is published monthly by Max Bunker Press in Italy. There are also editions in Bosnia and Herzegovina, Croatia (at least 4 different editions, as of 2008), Serbia and Slovenia. A Macedonian edition was also available for a while, and the Serbian editions are now imported into North Macedonia and Montenegro, still remaining hugely popular. The comic book has been adapted to animated film and theater plays, as well as used as a source of inspiration in books and movies.

== History ==
Three years before the comic book was published in May 1969, Max Bunker, along with illustrator Magnus, had the idea to create a satire of James Bond (they had previously created a serious spy character, Dennis Cobb). The initial script was written in August 1967 and the dialog revised in April 1968. The script included six main characters (Alan Ford, Bob Rock, Sir Oliver, The Boss, Jeremiah and Grunf), but the creators decided to omit Sir Oliver in the ultimate revision (July 1968), for fear of overwhelming readers with characters in the first issue. Raviola decided to base the drawing of Alan Ford on Irish actor Peter O'Toole.

According to Max Bunker, he wanted to create a comic book which did not fall into either of the then predefined categories of adventures and dark comics, like Satanik or Kriminal (both by Bunker and Raviola), or traditionally funny comics, like Mickey Mouse. He drew inspiration from the traditional Italian Comedy of the Art (commedia dell'arte) and the well known characters of that kind of comedy.

The first issue of the comic book, entitled "Il Gruppo TNT" ("The Group TNT"), was received mildly by its audience. The second issue, entitled "The Hollow Tooth" appeared in June 1968, introduced the Sir Oliver character, and was overshadowed by the first issue's lack of success. The reputation of Alan Ford grew with subsequent issues.

The character of Number One was introduced later into the series, in the 11th issue named "Number One". Cirano first appeared in the 18th issue ("Million Dollar Dog"), when he was adopted by Bob Rock, albeit unwillingly.

Magnus drew the first 75 issues, after which he was replaced by Paolo Piffarerio in 1975. In 1983, when the comic book moved to another publisher, Max Bunker Press, Raffaele della Monica and Giuliano Piccinnino replaced Piffarerio.

Currently the comic book is drawn by Dario Perucca (who also draws covers) with inks by Omar Pistolato. In its entire story the drawing style has remained the same set by Magnus.

== Translations ==
Alan Ford was translated into French, Croatian, Danish, Portuguese and in the 1990s subsequent Croatian, Bosnian, Serbian, Macedonian and Slovenian editions appeared. The French and Macedonian editions only saw twelve issues before they got dropped due to poor sales. The Portuguese edition only saw about three issues. It was also translated into Albanian in Serbia which saw only five issues before getting dropped, also due to poor sales.

=== Yugoslavia ===
A scene from 13th issue "Golf", Vjesnik's translation. Grunf presents his transportation invention to Bob Rock.

Alan Ford achieved great success in SFR Yugoslavia immediately after its 1972 introduction. It survived the dissolution of the country and in 2005 it was still one of the best selling comic books in the area.

The comic book's publishing was started in 1972 by the state-owned company Vjesnik from Zagreb. This edition is still a popular collector's item. First dozen issues didn't produce much success, however, the appearance in issue #25 of antagonist Superciuk (translated as Superhik) 'who steals from the poor and gives it to the rich' proved a hit with Yugoslav readership. Also, a lot of the comic book's success in Yugoslavia is due to Nenad Brixy's (born 1924 in Varaždinske Toplice) distinctive translation, rich in obscure, baroque-sounding Croatisms. A writer himself who penned several comedic novels about the clumsy detective character called Timothy Tacher, Brixy approached the job of translating Alan Ford in a free form and the resulting witty adaptation and imaginative text soon won him many admirers across the country.

Some of Vjesnik's editions were occasionally censored by the publisher. For example, in issue #16, "Don't vote for Notax", a line making fun of the American form of racism, reading "Firstly, I promise that we will get rid of the Blacks. ... This is a country of the white race, and who doesn't think that way will get punished..." was changed to "Firstly, I promise that we will get rid of our enemy. This is our country and who doesn't think that way will..." Certain pictures from the book were removed or repainted in some editions, while in some other editions those very same pictures appeared in original version.

There is a fake comic in circulation which features Yugoslav lifetime president Josip Broz Tito in a story line in one of the issues. Tito is portrayed as Number One's old acquaintance who often engaged in shady activities. The entire issue was allegedly banned from publishing in Yugoslavia. The fake issue was published decades later after the country disintegrated. However, apart from decent drawing of fake characters, and borrowed dialogue from various issues, giveaway is the issue number (#39), which in fact is a comic called Belle Epoque.

Brixy died in 1984, marking in many ways the end of an era for Alan Ford in Yugoslavia. Even the comic book's creator Max Bunker acknowledged Brixy's contributions to its popularity in Yugoslavia, praising him as "one of the rare translators who successfully depicted the black satire of the Alan Ford's story and drawings". The edition continued after Brixy's death, eventually ending in 1992 with the outbreak of the Yugoslav Wars.

After the breakup of Yugoslavia, Borgis picked up the publishing rights for the Croatian market, keeping the original series title Alan Ford Superstrip. Maverick from Kraljevo initially started publishing for the Serbian market, and the comic was in 2003 picked up by Color Press Group from Novi Sad. In the 2000s, the original episodes in Brixy's translation have been republished by Strip-agent in Croatia, under the title Alan Ford Klasik, again with great success and high circulation. Strip-agent is also publishing Alan Ford Extra (new Italian episodes), and Priče broja 1 (Number One's Stories).

In 1994 a play titled Alan Ford written by Mirjana Lazić and directed by Kokan Mladenović was staged at Teatar T in Belgrade. The play was an original story with most of the characters present, largely based on issue #30 ("The Bearded Gang"), but with numerous references to other episodes and characters. The play was performed in Croatian, as used by Brixy. In 2002 Radio Belgrade produced a radio drama based on the play.

In 2025 a comedy titled "Alan Ford" directed by Mario Kovač was staged in Kerempuh Theatre in Zagreb. The play was huge success and sold out show for months in advance.

In 2014 in Sarajevo, the Italian Embassy in Bosnia and Herzegovina organized the exhibition "Alan Ford in Bosnia and Herzegovina: yesterday and today", as part of the Month of Italian Culture in Bosnia Herzegovina festival.

=== France ===
In France, the comic book debuted in 1975 published by Sagédition and lasted for only twelve issues. As Magnus became better known in France, this edition became a collector's item.

In 2003, a small independent publisher, Taupinambour, started another edition with new issues.

A young version of Count Oliver. Cover for Alan Ford #83, May 1976. Art by Paolo Piffarerio.

Superciuk, the most popular villain of the series, portrayed on the cover of Alan Ford #171 (September 1983). Art by Raffaele Della Monica.

=== Brazil ===
In Brazil, the comic book also debuted in 1975, published by Editora Vecchi, and only lasted for about five issues.

=== Denmark ===
In Denmark, Alan Ford was published in 1974 by Interpresse under the name Oskar Mortensen, and only lasted for six issues.

== Main characters ==
=== Number One ===
Number One (real name unknown) is the leader of the TNT Group. He is wheelchair-bound, has a long beard and a bald scalp. A running gag in the series is his age: he claims to be alive since the Neanderthal era and to have met various characters from history, such as Nero, Homer and Maximilien Robespierre. He has a habit of telling stories of his past to his agents, who all fall asleep in the end, causing him to angrily wake them up by brandishing his stick.

He is a major underworld figure, well connected within the NYPD and the United States Army: he is known to have a black book which allegedly contains the secrets and past of every character he met in the comics, which he uses to blackmail them into obedience. His TNT group is used as a private agency for his contacts, and always requests large amounts of money for the job. He is extremely greedy and stingy: when Bob Rock requested the TNT's motto to be "All for one, one for all", he cleverly requested the letter O in the first word to be capitalized, leading to be "All for One, one for all"; in context, he gets to keep all the money for himself, while all TNT agents get only a single dollar for the mission. Despite having huge personal wealth, he never spends any of it. He operates from a dilapidated flower shop in Brooklyn in which TNT agents reside, while his hideout is in a storage room in the New York subway, which is kept secret to all but TNT agents (anyone from outside the group visiting it needs to be blindfolded and escorted to it by Grunf).

=== Alan Ford ===
Alan Ford is the central character of the series, a persiflage of James Bond. He is rather slim, with blonde hair and handsome features. He usually dresses in a black long-sleeved turtle neck, with black shoes and dark pants. He is the latest member of the group. He is shy, naive, very meek and humble, but perhaps one of the most effective agents of the series. He develops certain skills during the course of the series and turns to be quite tough and responsive member of TNT. He has a soft demeanor, is rarely angry, and while acknowledging the life under Number One as unfair, he is happy with what he gets. He grew up in an orphanage, ran a one-man advertising agency and was evicted from a slum due to neglecting bills at the start of the series, and he joined the TNT Group by accident, having been sent to a wrong address. He is one of the most trusted agents of Number One.

Running gag with Alan is his confusion and adaptability, intuitive personality, and in particular, his effect on encounters with women. His love interests turn out to either, use his gullible personality for their own agendas, genuinely love him but are criminals who end up being imprisoned, killed or on the run, or simply dislike his lack of success and lack of money. However, his bad luck with women turns for the better when he meets Minuette Macon. The two grow in love and Alan later marries her.

=== Bob Rock ===
Bob Rock is a senior member of TNT and Alan's best friend. He is a self-insertion of the artist Magnus and a persiflage of Sherlock Holmes. He is very short and has an abnormally large nose, which is the butt of many jokes. Another running gag is his very short and nasty temper: he is easily angered and reacts violently when provoked, and often has to be restrained by Alan or Sir Oliver, with a particular weakness for jokes about his nose. He dresses in tartan clothing.

He descends from a family of criminals: his father died when he was a child, and his mother died from machine gun fire during a botched robbery attempt. He has three younger brothers, a set of triplets called Tim, Tom and Tumb, who are professional criminals and frequently try to use Bob as a scapegoat in their criminal schemes, and Bob frequently berates his brothers. He is mostly at odds with Number One for poor salaries and tyrannical attitude, and Number One often beats him with a crutch when provoked. Despite this, he is one of the group's most trusted agents.

=== Sir Oliver ===
Sir Oliver of Olivers is an alleged English nobleman and a TNT member, a persiflage of Arsene Lupin. He is an avid kleptomaniac and fraudster: in every issue he is shown stealing. Due to his charming and witty personality, he is very successful in his field, always managing to steal anything, ranging from cinema tickets, spare change, wallets, to even larger items and vehicles with success, although he rarely gets to enjoy the loot because Number One is almost always onto him. Running gag is that, whenever he steals a large number of goods, he phones his never-seen fence Bing to sell him the goods (and asks about Bing's brother, who is always in some kind of trouble). He wears a monocle, a bowler hat and stripped pants with a long coat, vest and a tie, maintaining a stoic, noble appearance, which helps him in his various schemes. He can be described as a gentleman thief.

He comes from a wealthy family of Olivers, and his father owned a large business venture that went bankrupt by the time of his death: he and his two brothers went to a life of crime and were very successful while maintaining a noble appearance in the public: however, after they went their own ways, both of his brothers died. He managed to keep his criminal enterprise secret while being tailed by the police until he was discovered. He was sentenced to life in prison, but he managed to switch seats with an American criminal due to be transferred, and then he freed himself during a flight by parachuting himself out. He landed in New York and he was discovered by Number One while he was trying to hustle a rich businessman, and was persuaded to join TNT. His lateral thinking, wittiness and ability to save himself quickly from the most complicated situations make him the most valuable agent of TNT, a trait that even Number One acknowledges.

=== The Boss ===
The Boss (real name Gervasius De Statuis, Gervasius Twinkleminkleson in the Croatian translation, also known as Big Boss) is Number One's right-hand man and his second-in-command. Even though he is in charge of the flower shop while Number One is not around, in reality, he is a lazy, fat and aging TNT agent who tries his best to avoid work. He is at odds with Number One, who despises him for his laziness and inability to perform missions. He usually sleeps in the back of the flower shop, but occasionally joins the other TNT members on large-scale missions. After Bob, he is the most vocal about his salary, but is constantly rebuffed by Number One. His best friend is Jeremiah, but almost constantly bickers with him. He has a hamster named Squitty, and he is very devoted to him and protects him at all costs. He wears old ruptured pants, a bowler hat, a coat and a cardigan stripped shirt.

=== Jeremiah ===
Jeremiah is an aging member of the TNT. He is an Italian immigrant, and a running gag of the series is that he is an extreme hypochondriac who has or claims to have many diseases or medical syndromes (even some he himself invented). He is bald and nearly toothless, and he sleeps around in the flower shop with The Boss. He is usually on guard duty and never on active missions due to his age, but sometimes proves crucial to missions. Another running gag is his ability to sleep through most extreme situations without waking up. He is a former street vendor and a hermit, which caused his bad health.

=== Grunf ===
Otto Grunf is a naturalized German-born inventor. He is a former Luftwaffe mechanic who fought in the First World War,. He defected from the German army after his mechanical incompetence caused the airplane of the Red Baron to crash. He moved to America and changed his last name from Grunt to Grunf to avoid detection, and is mentioned to also serve in Second World War. He serves as the inventor, fabricator and the mechanic of the TNT group. A running gag in the series is his incompetence: he usually designs various Rube Goldberg machines that end up in failure, fails to properly service or change the vehicles or weaponry (driving a 1910s era car that usually explodes while attempting to start it or brandishing an 1880s revolver), or invents things that already exist (he claims to have invented the skateboard, which he named Skate-Grunf). Despite his heroic-like behavior and staunch belief in bravery (as seen by quotes stamped on his T-shirts), he is a very cowardly man, constantly running from danger. He usually dresses in a World War I-era flying ace uniform with goggles. He is very loyal and devoted to Number One and is never at odds with him. His job is usually to drive Number One around New York (in other words, push his wheelchair around).

=== The Great Caesar ===
The Great Caesar is the head of the Los Angeles division of the TNT group. He is a former Chicago mobster who made his fortune during the Prohibition era. After Al Capone's downfall, he became the most powerful mafioso in Chicago and held this position until his early retirement from business. He is independent from the New York division, but he still acts on Number One's orders. He usually dresses in white or grey suits, smokes Cuban cigars, is completely bald and always wears his trademark sunglasses. He also runs a flower shop, which, in contrast to the New York one, is much larger and successful than its counterpart. He has his own crew of TNT agents, consisting of Tim, Tom and Tumb, Bob's brothers, Professor Lamb, an inventor and former adversary of the TNT group, and Clodoveo, who remained for a while with him until he sent him back to Number One due to their constant quarrels. He enjoys fine wines, cigars, and he owns a panther, a bulldog and a gorilla, all tamed.

=== Clodoveo ===
Clodoveo is Number One's parrot. He is a very intelligent parrot, being able to speak 18 languages and 117 dialects. He is Number One's best friend and lives in his hideout with him, although the two constantly clash on most trivial subjects. He usually serves as the aviation in the TNT group and to carry messages from Number One to the TNT group or his allies when he is not around, and often ends up saving them in dangerous missions. He enjoys beef steaks and is a former alcoholic; his drinking habits are occasionally shown throughout the issues. He was absent throughout the part of the series due to his temporary relocation to Los Angeles when he lived with The Great Caesar; the two constantly clashed and both were relieved when Clodoveo returned to New York.

=== Cirano ===
Cirano is Bob Rock's dog, who often participates in the group's missions. He is a smart dog, though easily bribed with food. He was acquired by Bob very early in the issues, and even though the dog is officially his, the entire TNT group takes care of him, with mostly Alan, Bob or The Boss taking him for walks and/or feeding him. More than once, he was used by Sir Oliver for his various schemes. Running gag in the series is his frequent attempts to eat Squitty, only to be stopped and then violently assaulted by The Boss.

=== Pellicus ===
Pellicus is a pelican owned by Number One. He is rather large and is devoted to Number One, who saved him from being slaughtered. He used to be in the New York Zoo until he was evicted for being "a nightmare". He loves eating fish and usually serves to transport Number One (and sometimes, the entire TNT group) across large areas (at one time, transporting Number One across the Atlantic Ocean). A running gag is his incredible strength and endurance for an ordinary pelican.

Many of the TNT Group members have disappeared from most recent issues, and the group currently consists of Alan, Minuette, Number One and Clodoveo, under the name "Investigation agency T.N.T at low cost".

== Main enemies ==
- Superciuk (pronounced "Superchook", meaning-wise communicating something like "Superdrunk"). Real name: Ezechiele Bluff, in Vjesnik version translated as "Superhik" and Milogled Bluff. Superciuk is the most prominent villain of the series, sometimes being the main subject of the plot. He steals from poor people and gives to rich, like an anti-Robin Hood of sorts. His main weapon is his deadly breath, alimented with poor quality Barbera and onion tomatoes; in Italian «chook» sounds like «ciucco», i.e. "very drunk". In his normal life Superciuk is a street-sweeper who is constantly vexed by his companion, Beppa Giosef.
- Gommaflex was created for the television adaptation of the comic book. This character has a rubber face which can assume the lineaments of anybody, using this capability for criminal intents. His name is based on his powers, because "Gomma" means "Rubber" in Italian and "Flex" is intended as short for "flexibility". He is, in a way, similar to the Spider-Man villain, Chameleon.
- Anten Man is perhaps inspired by Silvio Berlusconi when he was simply a TV and publishing industry man. He tries to achieve a monopoly in broadcasting by obscurating the transmissions of other companies. "Anten" refers to "antenna".

Other enemies, whose names are normally puns in Italian, are Katodik, Mr. Tromb, the mobster boss "Il Grande Cesare", Wurdalak the vampire (coming from the pages of Satanik), the scientist Aseptik, the quick-change Arsenico Lupon (pun of Arsène Lupin), the mobster families, the Mangia's masonry, ghost gangster Baby Kate, masked Conspirator, magnate mr. Fitzgerald and witch Witchcraft.

== Film ==
Alan Ford and the TNT Group vs. Superciuk
- Italian: Alan Ford e il gruppo TNT contro Superciuk
- Directed by: Max Bunker
- Written by: Max Bunker; Mauro Ottaviani
- Starring: Roberto Del Giudice; Sergio Matteucci
- Music by: Marco Persichetti
- Distributed by: Rai Due
- Release date: 1981
- Running time: 26 minutes
- Country: Italy
- Language: Italian

Alan Ford and the TNT Group vs. Superciuk is an animated short film directed by Max Bunker featuring the members of the TNT Group from the comic Alan Ford. A first, considerably shorter edition was broadcast in 1981 on Rai Due as part of the programme Buonasera con... Supergulp!

Expanded to reach its current runtime, it has never been broadcast in full on television and was only distributed on VHS produced by Max Bunker Production (already the producer of Bunker's previous film: Delitti, amore e gelosia), as part of the DVD collection published by La Gazzetta dello Sport in 2010 dedicated to "Comics on TV" and was finally released on a standalone DVD produced by 1000VolteMeglio Publishing in 2013.

The film's graphic design was overseen by Paolo Piffarerio. The theme song, titled Alan Ford e il gruppo T.N.T., is sung by Francesco Zitelli.

== In popular culture ==
- Emir Kusturica's 1998 movie Black Cat, White Cat features a character (one of Dadan Karambolo's gangster cronies) who reads an Alan Ford comicbook throughout the film. Furthermore, most of the transport contraptions used by another character in the movie are directly inspired by Grunf's inventions.
- Prljavo Kazalište, a Croatian rock band was named after the translated line in Alan Ford's issue called "Broadway".
- Pero Defformero, a Serbian heavy metal band, was named after one of the characters.
- Popcycle, a Serbian britpop band, was initially called Gervasius Twinkleminkleson after the name of The Boss.
- Superhiks, a Macedonian rock band, was named after one of the villains in Alan Ford, Superciuk.
- In the song "Za tebe" by Croatian punk rock band KUD Idijoti, one of the verses is "Kad srce radi bi-bam ba-bam" ("When a heart goes bi-bam ba-bam"), the title of the 32nd issue of Alan Ford in Vjesnik's translation. Another song by the same band is called "Daj, daj, daj", the title of 5th issue of Alan Ford in Vjesnik's translation.
- Pipi Kola, a Serbian experimental band, was named from one frame in which appears a character with sign "Pipi Kola" (number 87).
- Numerous lines and catchphrases from Alan Ford entered Croatian and Serbian slang. Number One, the name of an ageless terrible leader of TNT group, is sometimes used when jokingly referring to any old and crotchety person. Similarly, the name of main villain Superciuk (Superhik in Croatian) who has a notorious alcohol problem is sometimes used when joking about any drunkard, and Jeremija (Croatian name for Geremia) is often used for someone sickly or easily hurt. Sir Oliver's entering line, which he used in almost every episode when he would call his pawnbroker Bing to sell him some stolen goods, "Hello, Bing, how's the brother?", also became a sort of catchphrase amongst numerous Alan Ford fans in Croatia and Serbia. Sir Oliver's line "Cijena, prava sitnica" (Price? A bargain!) is now commonplace for "it's too expensive".
- 1980s Yugoslavian/Croatian software studio Suzy Soft made a game heavily inspired by Alan Ford character Superciuk. The game was called The Drinker and was available on ZX Spectrum and on Yugoslav-made Galaksija computer.
- One of the weapons in the game Serious Sam II, created by the Croatian software house Croteam, is a bomb-carrying parrot named "Clawdovic" or "Klodovik". Klodovik was also the name of the parrot Clodoveo in the Croatian editions of the comic book.
- The Department for Electronics of the University of Belgrade's Electrical Engineering School website (tnt.etf.rs) is named after TNT Group.
- Event space in Ljubljana called Cvetličarna is inspired by the flower shop that acted as the front for the TNT Group. The initial owner was TNT events also named after the agents' group.
