= Max Bunker =

Comic book writer and publisher (born 1939)

- Born: Luciano Secchi; 24 August 1939 (age 87) Milan, Italy
- Area: writer
- Notable works: Kriminal; Satanik; Maxmagnus; Alan Ford

Max Bunker, pen name of Luciano Massimiliano Secchi (born 24 August 1939), is an Italian comic book writer and publisher, best known as the co-author of Alan Ford.

Bunker's career started in 1960 when he co-founded, together with his brother-in-law Andrea Corno, a publishing house focused on the production of comics called Editoriale Corno. In 1962, Bunker wrote a Western-style comic book, Maschera Nera (Black Mask). He went on to create more comic series in collaboration with Magnus (Roberto Raviola) such as Kriminal and Satanik and Maxmagnus. Bunker and Magnus' arguably most successful creative endeavour is Alan Ford. Originally published in May 1969, the series ran for 75 issues. When Editoriale Corno closed in 1984, Bunker founded Max Bunker Press and continued to publish Alan Ford in collaboration with other artists such as Paolo Piffarerio.

== Selected works ==
- Kriminal (1964)
- Satanik (1964)
- Gesebel (1966)
- Maxmagnus (1968)
- Alan Ford (1969)
- Fouche (1973)
- Daniel (1973)
- Kerry Cross (1994)

== Sources ==
- Max Bunker dossier FFF (in Italian)
