= 1972 in comics =

Notable events of 1972 in comics.

== Events ==
=== Year overall ===
- Marvel Comics forms their British publishing arm, Marvel UK (under the corporate name Magazine Management London Ltd.).
- Phil Seuling founds Sea Gate Distributors, developing the concept of the direct market distribution system for getting comics directly into comic book specialty shops, bypassing the established newspaper/magazine distributor method.
- DC acquires licensing rights to the Marvel Family, originally published by Fawcett Comics.
- Fleming H. Revell establishes Spire Christian Comics.
- Jacques Glénat, at only twenty years old, establishes Glénat.
- Newspaper strip Captain Kate ceases syndication.
- Kinney National Company spun off its non-entertainment assets and changed its name to Warner Communications.
- In Italy, Renzo Barbieri founds Edifumetto, a publishing house specialized in cheap erotic comics, in concurrence with the EdiGi of his former associate Renzo Cavedon. The firm launches, in this year, new characters, such as the monster Wallenstein (April), Zora (September), Biancaneve and the super-hero Playcolt (November).

=== January ===
- January 2: Il corriere dei piccoli, splits in two magazines: Il corriere dei piccoli (The little ones’ courier), aimed to children, and Il corriere dei ragazzi (The boys’ courier) aimed to teenagers.
- January 6: In Pif Gadget, the Corto Maltese story Concert en O mineur pour harpe et nitroglycérine by Hugo Pratt is published. The first of four tales set in the Celtic countries (Ireland, England, Belgium and Brittany).
- January 7: In the magazine De Nieuwe Gommaar Timmermans creates De Nieuwe Ark, a philosophical comic will run until 8 September 1972.
- January 19: In Spirou, the first chapter of Tora Torapa by Jean-Claude Fournier is published.
- Korak, Son of Tarzan (1964 series), with issue #45, cancelled by Gold Key Comics. (The title is acquired and continued by DC in June.)
- Primaggio Mantovi's Sacarrolha debuts.
- The stories Hound of the Moaning Hills' and Storm dancers by Carl Barks and Kay Wright are published in Huey, Dewey and Louie Junior Woodchucks.
- Iorix le grand by Jacques Martin.

=== February ===
- February 12: After a long trial Al Capp is fined for attempted adultery in a plea bargain, his public image and the popularity of Li'l Abner are damaged beyond repair.
- February 24: In Spirou, the first chapter of L’orgue du diable by Roger Leloup is published.
- February 24: in L’Intrepido, debut the SF series Iber, by Antonio Mancuso and Antonio Toldo.
- February 26: The final episode of Big Sister appears in print. It had run since 1928.
- The Brave and the Bold #100 (February /March cover date): Batman teams up with Robin, Green Arrow, Black Canary, and Green Lantern. (DC Comics)
- With issue #206, Gold Key Comics cancels Tarzan, a title it acquired from Dell Comics in 1962.

=== March ===
- March 30: In Pilote, the first chapter of the Blueberry story Ballade pour un cercueil (Ballade for a coffin) by Jean-Michel Charlier and Jean Giraud is published, the last episode of the Blueberry trilogy about the search for Confederate gold.
- The first issue of the French Disney comics magazine Picsou Magazine is published.
- Marvel Comics launches its second ongoing Spider-Man title, Marvel Team-Up.
- House of Mystery #200, edited by Joe Orlando. (DC Comics)
- The story The Day the Mountain Shook, by Carl Barks and Kay Wright is published in Huey, Dewey and Louie Junior Woodchucks.
- Binky Brown Meets the Holy Virgin Mary, by Justin Green.

=== April ===
- April 18: In Le journal de Tintin, the first chapter of the Ric Hochet story Requiem pour une idole (Requiem for an idol) by André-Paul Duchâteau and Tibet is published.
- Marvel Comics launches Marvel Premiere, an anthology series.
- With issue #207, DC Comics begins publishing Tarzan, acquired from Gold Key Comics.
- With issue #89 (April /May cover-date), DC suspends publishing Green Lantern.
- The first issue of the Italian magazine Il Mago is published by Mondadori.

=== May ===
- May 1: The first issue of the adult comic magazine L'Écho des Savanes is published. Up until 1974 it only features comics by the three founders Marcel Gotlib, Nikita Mandryka and Claire Bretécher.
- May 4: In Pilote the first chapter of Asterix and the Soothsayer by Goscinny and Uderzo, is published.
- May 21: The final episode of Jerry and Hally Skelly's newspaper comic strip Captain Kate is published.
- May 23: In Charles M. Schulz' Peanuts Rerun van Pelt makes his debut.
- Wonder Woman #200 (May/June cover date): 52-page giant, "The Beauty Hater," by Denny O'Neil and Dick Giordano. (DC Comics)
- Tomahawk, with issue #140 (May/June cover date), canceled by DC.
- The Donald Duck stories Huey, Dewey and Louie Junior Woodchucks, Duckmade disaster are published by Carl Barks and Kay Wright.
- The Italian magazine Lo scolaro, after sixty years of history and more than a thousand issues, ceases publications.

=== June ===
- June 15: The first chapter of the Lucky Luke story Chasseur de primes, by Goscinny and Morris is published in Pilote.
- Marvel Comics launches Luke Cage, Hero for Hire, which is the debut of the title character.
- Thor #200: "The End of the World," by Gerry Conway (pages 1, 21), Stan Lee (pages 2–20), John Buscema, and John Verpoorten.
- Action Comics #413: Metamorpho becomes the backup feature.
- The Avengers #100: "Whatever Gods There Be," by Roy Thomas and Barry Smith.
- The Darkhold, also known as The Book of Sins, is introduced in Marvel Spotlight #4.
- Stan Lee starts his long-running monthly column, Stan's Soapbox, in Marvel's readers pages Bullpen Bulletins. It will appear until 1982.
- Korak, Son of Tarzan, with issue #46, taken over by DC from Gold Key Comics.
- With issue #12 (June/July cover date), All-Star Western (vol. 2) changes its name to Weird Western Tales — DC Comics
- With issue #5 (June/July cover date), The Sinister House of Secret Love changes its name to Secrets of Sinister House — DC Comics

=== July ===
- July 12: The final episode of Marten Toonder's Kappie is published.
- July 22: The first edition of Wizard World Chicago, aka the Chicago Comic-Con, is organized by Nancy Warner.
- After a year-long experimentation with 25-cent, 52-page comics, DC Comics reduces the price of a typical comic to 20 cents, and returns the page count to 36 pages.
- Art Spiegelman publishes "Maus", a three-page strip which will eventually turn into Maus, for the one-shot underground magazine Funny Animals [cq], an underground comic published by Apex Novelties.
- Detective Comics #425: Jason Bard replaces Batgirl as the backup feature.
- Sgt. Fury #100: "One Hundredth Anniversary," by Gary Friedrich, Dick Ayers, and Mike Esposito. (Marvel Comics)
- Pippo e I parastinchi di Olimpia (Goofy and the Olympia shin guards), by Romano Scarpa, in Olympic Goofy, a story written for the 1972 Summer Olympics.
- Il grande intrigo (The big plot) by Gian Luigi Bonelli and Erio Nicolò; Tex Willer is sentenced to death with a false charge. The story, exceptionally long (five albums), is considered a masterwork among the classic adventures of the hero.

=== August ===
- August 6: In Il giornalino, Notturno a Macao, by Claudio Nizzi and Ruggero Giovannini; debut of the sea adventures series Capitan Erik.
- August 31: In Pif Gadget, the Corto Maltese story Au nom d'Allah le très miséricordieux, le compatissant by Hugo Pratt, is published, the first chapter of The Ethiopian, an arc of four stories set in Africa, where the captain has, as a partner, the Afar warrior Dash.
- The Flash #217: Four months after the cancellation of his own title, Green Lantern begins appearing as a backup feature in The Flash #217 (Aug.-Sept. 1972).
- Justice League of America #100: "The Unknown Soldier of Victory!", by Len Wein, Dick Dillin, and Joe Giella.
- Forever People, with issue #11, is cancelled by DC.
- In the story The kingdom under the sea, by Rodolfo Cimino and Giorgio Cavazzano, Queen Reginella makes her debut.

=== September ===
- September 13: The first episode of Gommaar Timmermans' comic Iamboree is published in Knack. It will run until 1982.
- September 14: RAI broadcasts the first episode of Gulp, spectacle of "TV comics" very popular among the Italian young viewers. For the show, original comics are realized, as The flying fat women, by Vittorio Metz, La secchia rapita, by Pino Zac and moreover Nick Carter, by Bonvi and De Maria.
- September 19: In Le journal de Tintin, the first chapter of the Michel Vaillant story Cauchemar (Nightmare) is published by Jean Graton.
- House of Secrets #100, edited by Joe Orlando. (DC Comics)
- Stan Lee becomes Marvel Comics' publisher; Roy Thomas takes over as Marvel editor-in-chief.
- In The People's Comics, Robert Crumb draws the story Fritz the Cat Superstar, in which his most famous character Fritz the Cat is murdered, thus terminating the comic strip. Crumb drew the story in reaction to Ralph Bakshi's animated feature film adaptation which premiered a few months earlier.

=== October ===
- October 28: The final episode of Mort Walker and Frank Roberge's Mrs. Fitz's Flats is published.
- Date with Debbi, with issue #18 (October /November cover date), is cancelled by DC.
- Kamandi, The Last Boy on Earth #1: new series by writer/artist Jack Kirby is launched by DC Comics with an October/November cover date.
- New Gods, with issue #11 (October /November cover date), is temporarily cancelled by DC (it is revived with issue #12 in 1977).
- Silver Age inker Sid Greene dies at age 66.

=== November ===
- November 9: The first episode of Willy Vandersteen's comics series Robert en Bertrand is published and will run until 1992.
- Girls' Love Stories, with issue #180 (November /December cover-date), cancelled by DC Comics.

=== December ===
- December 5 : In Le journal de Tintin, the first chapter of Épitaphe pour Ric Hochet (Epitaph for Ric Hochet) by André-Paul Duchâteau and Tibet is published.
- December 7: In Le journal de Tintin, the first chapter of the Bruno Brazil story Sarabanda a Sacramento is published by Greg and William Vance.
- December 28: The final episode of Marcel Gotlib's Rubrique-à-Brac is printed in Pilote.
- Justice League of America #103, Writer Len Wein and artists Dick Dillin and Dick Giordano craft the DC portion of a metafictional unofficial crossover spanning titles from both major comics companies. The Marvel chapters appear with 1973 cover dates. Each comic featured writers Steve Englehart, Gerry Conway, and Len Wein, as well as Wein's first wife Glynis, interacting with Marvel or DC characters at the Rutland Halloween Parade in Rutland, Vermont. Beginning in Amazing Adventures #16 (by Englehart with art by Bob Brown and Frank McLaughlin), the story continued in Justice League of America #103 (by Wein, Dillin and Giordano), and concluded in Thor #207 (by Conway and penciler John Buscema).

=== Specific date unknown ===
- Carlos Enrique Figueroa creates the comics character Tricolín.
- The first episode of the Polish humorous historical comic series Kajko i Kokosz by Janusz Christa is published.
- David Sutherland introduces the character Cuthbert in The Bash Street Kids.
- James McQuade's erotic series Misty makes its debut.

== Births ==
=== April ===
- April 26: John Paul Leon, American comic book artist (Static, Earth X, The Winter Men), (d. 2021).

=== November ===
- November 22: Cyril Pedrosa, French comic book artist, colorist and writer.

== Deaths ==
=== January ===
- January 5: Bud Counihan, American comics artist (Betty Boop comics, Henry Hasenpfeffer, The Big Little Family, Little Napoleon), dies at age 84.
- January 28: Dino Buzzati, Italian novelist, author also, as writer and illustrator (Poem strip), dies at age 65.

=== February ===
- February 2: István Pesthy, AKA Falus, Hungarian dentist, cartoonist and comic artist, dies at age 65.

=== March ===
- March 4: Charles Biro, American comics artist (Airboy, Steel Sterling, Daredevil Comics), dies at age 60.
- March 5: Frans Meijer, also published under the name Jaap van Loon, Ko Koster, F.M., Piet Pion and Henk, Dutch comics artist (created various one-shot comics and continued Fred en Minet), dies at age 71.
- March 17: Antonio Rubio, Cuban cartoonist and comics artist (El Monguito, El Marcianito, Angelitos, Angeles de la Guardia), dies at age 51.
- March 31: Aleksandar Denkov, Bulgarian illustrator, animator and comics artist (Hrabriat Eskimos, Zagovor v Dvoreca, Ban Ianuka), dies at age 47.

=== May ===
- May 5: Frank Tashlin, aka Tish Tash, aka Frank Tash, American animator, cartoonist, illustrator, screenwriter, film director and comics artist (Van Boring), dies at age 59.
- May 23: Louis Salvérius, Belgian comics artist (Les Tuniques Bleues), unexpectedly dies from a heart attack at the age of 38.
- May 23: Nino Pagot, Italian comics artist and animator (Calimero), dies at the age of 64.
- May 26: Robert Dansler, aka Bob Dan, Bobby, Erdé or Hoberdon (Jim Mystère, Bill Tornade, Jack Sport, Tarou, Maxime), French comics artist, dies at age 71.
- May 28: Rea Irvin, American illustrator, graphic artist and comics artist (The Smythes, designed the mascot of The New Yorker: Eustace Tilley), dies at age 90 from a stroke.

=== June ===
- June 17: Frank Ellis, American comics artist (Jane Arden), dies at age 74.
- June 20: Johanna Berhardina Midderigh-Bokhorst, Dutch illustrator and comics artist (made text comics for the magazine Zonneschijn), dies at age 92.
- June 22: Johan Jacob Voskuil, aka Jo Voskuil, Dutch illustrator, painter and comics artist (Klit, de Schoonzoon), dies at age 75.

=== July ===
- July 8: John Henry Gordon Freeman, aka Don Freeman, British comics writer (Buck Ryan, Jane, Garth, Belinda Blue Eyes) and novelist, dies at age 69.
- July 28: Fanny Cory, American illustrator and comics artist (Sonnysayings, Little Miss Muffet), dies at age 94.

=== August ===
- August 9: Noël Bissot, Belgian comics artist (Le Baron, Youk et Yak, Le Picrate, Croquemitron, Juju), dies at age 55.
- Specific date unknown: Lovrien Gregory, American comics artist (The Pioneers), dies at age 84.

=== September ===
- September 12:
  - Harry S. Anderson, American comics artist (Robin Hood & Company, T-Man), dies at age 61.
  - Max Fleischer, American animator and comics artist (Koko the Clown, Betty Boop, Popeye the Sailor), dies at age 89.
  - Ivar Mauritz-Hansen, Norwegian illustrator and comics artist (Nils og Blåmann, Onkell Brombass, Detektiv Luresen, Råd for Uråd, Jumbo, Professor Tanke), dies at age 75.
- September 20: William Ritt, American comics writer and journalist (Brick Bradford), dies at the age of 69 or 70.
- Specific date unknown: September: Regino Bernad, Spanish-French comics artist (comics based on the novels of Gaston Leroux), dies at age 70.

=== October ===
- October 31: John L. Jukes, British comics artist (Ben and Bert the Kid Cops, Popgun Pete, continued Alfie the Air Tramp and George the Jolly Gee-Gee), dies at age 71.
- Specific date unknown: Sid Greene, American comic artist (worked for Funnies Inc., Ace Periodicals, Hillman, DC Comics), dies at age 64.

=== December ===
- December 11: Don Gunn, American comics artist (Disney comics, Looney Tunes comics), dies at age 66.

=== Specific date unknown ===
- Gaspar Bolaños, Mexican comics artist (Rolando el Rabioso), dies at age 63 or 64.
- Paul Braig, French painter and comics artist (La Vie Imaginée de Pablo Picasso), dies at age 65 or 66.
- C.H. Chapman, British comics artist (Billy Bunter) dies at the age of 92 or 93.
- Allen Dean, American comics artist, painter and illustrator (King of the Royal Mounted), dies at age 82 or 83.
- Francis Kirn, American comics artist (Uncle Wiggily), dies at age 67 or 68.
- Hans Nije, Dutch musician and comics artist (Tim Tuimel, Lodewijk, Boudewijn), dies at age 54.
- Bert Vandeput, British comics artist (Roy of the Rovers, Mystery Ice-Ace of the Arrows, Dozy Danny - Football Star in the Making, Come Away the United, Wilson - the Wonder Athlete), dies at age 56 or 57.

== Conventions ==
- March 3–5: Cosmicon (York University Winters College, Toronto, Ontario, Canada) — first iteration of this early Canadian comic book/science fiction/horror convention; official guests include Jim Steranko (Guest of Honor), Neal Adams, Gray Morrow, Alain Resnais, and Dan Adkins
- April 25–28: First American International Congress of Comics (New York City)
- May 26–29: EC Fan Addict Convention (Hotel McAlpin, New York City) — official guests include William Gaines, Al Williamson, Wally Wood, George Evans, Harvey Kurtzman, Joe Orlando, and Al Feldstein
- June: Multicon (Biltmore Hotel, Oklahoma City, Oklahoma) — 2nd occurrence of this show; guests include Will Eisner
- June 16–18: Phoenix Con (Saguaro Hall, Arizona State University, Tempe, Arizona) — 2nd occurrence of this show, organized by Bruce Hamilton and the Phoenix Fans of Art & Nostalgia (PFAN); guest of honor is C. C. Beck
- July 1–5: Comic Art Convention (Statler Hilton Hotel, New York City) — Jack Kirby and Alex Toth guests of honor; other guests include Jim Steranko; announcement of the 1971 Goethe Awards
- July 22–23: Nostalgia '72 (Pick-Congress Hotel, Chicago, Illinois) — first Chicago-area comics and collectibles convention, produced by Nancy Warner; c. 2,000 attendees
- July 29–30: FanCon (Hotel Commodore Maury, Norfolk, Virginia) — produced by Angel Gabriele/Dixieland Fandom; guests include Guest of Honor Wally Wood, Kelly Freas, Murray Leinster, Jeff Jones, Michael Kaluta, and Frank Brunner
- August 3–6: Detroit Tri-Con (Pick-Fort Shelby Hotel, Detroit, MI) — organized by Tom Orzechowski and Michael Kucharski (with other committee members including Terry Austin, Tony Isabella, Arvell Jones, Martin Pasko, and Jerry Bails); official guests include Edmond Hamilton, Leigh Brackett, Gray Morrow, Lin Carter, Al Williamson, Russ Myers, John Jakes, T. Casey Brennan, Robert Taylor, Ken Muse, and Fan Guest of Honor Rick Yager; program cover by Gray Morrow
- August 5–6: Comicon '72 (British Comic Art Convention) (Waverley Hotel, London, England) — 5th annual show, produced by Nick Landau
- August 18–21: San Diego's West Coast Comic Convention (El Cortez Hotel, San Diego, California) — 900+ attendees; official guests: Bob Clampett, Harry Harrison, Jack Kirby, Katherine Kurtz, Mel Lazarus, Roy Thomas, and Milt Gray
- September 2–4: Newcon '72 (New England Comic Art Convention) (Boston, Massachusetts) — organized by Martin Greim; guests included Roy Thomas (Guest of Honor), Jim Steranko, Otto Binder, and Vincent Fago
- October 19–22: Detroit Triple Fan Fair (Detroit Hilton, Detroit, Michigan) — 7th edition of the convention, program includes "a history of the Detroit Triple Fan Fair"; official guests include Neal Adams, Jim Steranko, Vaughn Bodé, Jeff Jones, Russ Heath, Bud Plant, Dale Manesis, Jerry Bails, Phil Seuling, Gene Roddenberry, and Majel Barrett
- October 29–November 4: Salone Internazionale dei Comics (Lucca, Italy) a.k.a. "Lucca 8" — festival expands to seven days
- November 24–26: Creation Con II (Statler Hilton Hotel, New York City) — guests of honor: Philip José Farmer and Frank Kelly Freas; other guests: Vaughn Bodé, Jim Steranko, Gray Morrow, Michael Kaluta, Neal Adams, Howard Chaykin, John Severin, Frank Brunner, Isaac Asimov, Ron Goulart, Carlos Garzon, Roy Krenkel, and Hans Stefan Santesson
- December 2: Comic Mart (Lyndhurst Hall, Kentish Town, London, U.K.) — first "official" Comic Mart, produced by Rob Barrow and Nick Landau, with over 250 attendees

== Awards ==
=== Goethe Awards ===
Published in The Buyer's Guide to Comics Fandom (TBG) #38 (June 15, 1973) (for comics published in 1972). Ballots were printed in TBG, Comic Crusader, The Comic Reader, the Gazette Advertiser, The Menomonee Falls Gazette, and Rocket's Blast Comicollector. 1,011 fans cast their votes. Winners in each category are listed in boldface, along with other fan-selected nominees in order of finish.

- Favorite Pro Artist: **Barry Windsor-Smith**
  - Neal Adams
  - Bernie Wrightson
  - Jack Kirby
- Favorite Pro Writer: **Roy Thomas**
  - Len Wein
  - Jack Kirby
  - Dennis O'Neil
  - Steve Englehart
- Favorite Pro Editor: **Roy Thomas**
  - Julius Schwartz
- Favorite Pro Comic Book: **Conan** (Marvel)
  - Swamp Thing (DC)
  - Tarzan (DC)
  - The Avengers (Marvel)
- Favorite Non-Newsstand Comic Book: **The Menomonee Falls Gazette**
  - Bedtime Stories
  - Further Adventures of the Fabulous Furry Freak Brothers (Rip Off Press)
  - Fantagor (Fantagor Press)
  - Skull Comics (Last Gasp)
  - Phase (John Carbonero and Sal Quartuccio)
- Favorite Comic-Book Story: "The Black Hound of Vengeance!" (Conan #20)
  - "And Through Him Save a World" (Green Lantern #89) (DC)
  - "The Pact" (New Gods #20) (DC)
  - "Dark Genesis" (Swamp Thing #1) (DC)
- Favorite Comic-Book Character: **Conan** (Marvel)
  - Batman (DC)
  - Spider-Man (Marvel)
  - Tarzan (DC)
  - Green Arrow (DC)
- Favorite Fan Magazine: **The Comic Reader** (edited by Paul Levitz)
  - The Buyer's Guide to Comics Fandom
  - Comixscene
  - Comic Crusader
  - Graphic Story World
  - Rocket's Blast Comicollector
- Favorite Fan Writer: **Don and Maggie Thompson**
  - Tom Fagan
  - Tony Isabella
  - Jan Strnad
  - Paul Levitz
- Favorite Fan Artist: **Richard Corben**
  - Don Newton
  - John Fantucchio
  - Martin Greim

=== Shazam Awards ===
Presented in 1973 for comics published in 1972:

- Best Individual Story: "Dark Genesis", by Len Wein and Berni Wrightson, Swamp Thing #1 (DC Comics)
- Best Individual Short Story (Dramatic): "The Demon Within", by John Albano and Jim Aparo, House of Mystery #201 (DC)
- Best Writer (Dramatic Division): Len Wein
- Best Penciller (Dramatic Division): Berni Wrightson
- Best Humor Story: "The Poster Plague", by Steve Skeates and Sergio Aragones, House of Mystery #202 (DC)
- Best Inker (Humor Division): Sergio Aragones
- Special Award: DC letterer/proofreader Gerda Gattel "for bringing her special warmth to our history"
- Superior Achievement by an Individual: Julius Schwartz "for bringing the Shazam Family back into print"

== First issue by title ==
=== DC Comics ===
The Demon

Release: August /September Writer/Artist: Jack Kirby. Inker: Mike Royer.

Kamandi, The Last Boy On Earth

Release: October /November Writer/Artist: Jack Kirby. Inker: Mike Royer.

Supergirl

Release: November. Editor: Dorothy Woolfolk.

Swamp Thing

Release: October /November Writer: Len Wein. Artist: Bernie Wrightson.

Weird Mystery Tales

Release: July/August Editor: E. Nelson Bridwell.

Weird Worlds

Release: September. Editor: Dennis O'Neil.

=== Marvel Comics ===
The Cat

Release: November. Writers: Roy Thomas and Linda Fite. Artists: Marie Severin and Wally Wood.

Chamber of Chills

Release: November Writer: Steve Englehart. Editor: Roy Thomas.

The Defenders

Release: August. Writer: Steve Englehart. Artists: Sal Buscema and Frank Giacoia.

Doc Savage: The Man of Bronze

Release: October. Writers: Roy Thomas (plot) and Steve Englehart (script). Artists: Ross Andru and Jim Mooney.

Hero for Hire

Release: June. Writers: Roy Thomas, John Romita, and Archie Goodwin. Artists: George Tuska and Billy Graham.

Journey into Mystery (vol. 2)

Release: October. Editor: Roy Thomas.

Jungle Action

Release: October. Editor: Roy Thomas.

Marvel Premiere

Release: April. Writer: Roy Thomas. Artists: Gil Kane and Dan Adkins.

Marvel Team-Up

Release: March. Writer: Roy Thomas. Artists: Ross Andru and Mike Esposito.

Marvel Triple Action

Release: February. Reprints early issues of The Avengers and Fantastic Four.

The Mighty World of Marvel

Release: October 7 (weekly) by Marvel UK.

Night Nurse

Release: November. Writer: Jean Thomas. Artist: Winslow Mortimer.

Shanna the She-Devil

Release: September. Writers: Carole Seuling and Steve Gerber. Artists: George Tuska and Vince Colletta.

Supernatural Thrillers

Release: December. Writers: Theodore Sturgeon (original story) and Roy Thomas (adaptation). Artists: Marie Severin and Frank Giacoia.

The Tomb of Dracula

Release: April. Writer: Gerry Conway. Artist: Gene Colan.

Werewolf by Night

Release: September. Writer: Gerry Conway. Artists: Mike Ploog and Frank Chiaramonte.

=== Other publishers ===
Archie at Riverdale High

Release: August by Archie Comics.

Binky Brown Meets the Holy Virgin Mary

Release: March by Last Gasp. Writer/Artist: Justin Green.

Captain Paragon

Release: by Paragon Publications. Writer/Artist: Bill Black.

Death Rattle

Release: June by Kitchen Sink Press.

Midnight Tales

Release: December by Charlton. Artist: Wayne Howard.

The People's Comics

Release: September by Golden Gate Publishing Company. Artist/Writer: Robert Crumb.

Mystery Comics Digest

Release: March by Gold Key Comics.

The Rip Off Review of Western Culture

Release: June by Rip Off Press. Editor: J. David Moriaty.

The Rose of Versailles (Berusaiyu no Bara)

Release: May 21 by Margaret magazine (Shueisha). Writer/artist: Riyoko Ikeda.

Tits & Clits Comix

Release: July by Nanny Goat Productions. Writers/Artists/Editors: Joyce Farmer and Lyn Chevli

Wimmen's Comix

Release: November by Last Gasp.

== Initial appearance by character name ==
=== DC Comics ===
- Alec Holland, in Swamp Thing #1 (November)
- Anton Arcane, in Swamp Thing #2 (December 1972/January 1973)
- Bernadeth, in Mister Miracle #6 (February)
- Cassandra Craft, in Phantom Stranger #17 (February)
- Jim Corrigan, in Superman's Pal Jimmy Olsen #149 (May)
- Destiny, in Weird Mystery Tales #1
- Devilance, in Forever People #11 (August)
- Doctor Moon, in Batman #240 (March)
- Effron the Sorcerer, in World's Finest Comics #210 (March)
- Etrigan the Demon, in The Demon #1 (August)
- Forager, in New Gods #9 (August)
- Funky Flashman, in Mister Miracle #6 (January /February)
- Gilotina, in Mister Miracle #8 (May)
- Heggra, in New Gods #7 (March)
- Human Target, in Action Comics #419 (December)
- Jason Blood, in The Demon #1 (August)
- Jonah Hex, in All-Star Western #10 (February /March)
- Kamandi, in Kamandi #1 (October)
- Kanto, in Mister Miracle #7 (March /April )
- Lashina, in Mister Miracle #6 (January)
- Morgaine le Fey, in The Demon #1 (September)
- Mad Harriet, in Mister Miracle #6 (January)
- Magnar, in Superman's Pal, Jimmy Olsen #147 (March)
- Matthew Cable, in Swamp Thing #1 (October /November)
- Nebula Man, in Justice League of America #100 (August)
- Starbreaker, in Justice League of America #96 (February)
- Steppenwolf, in New Gods #7 (February)
- Stompa, in Mister Miracle #6 (January)
- Terra-Man, in Superman #249 (March)
- Un-Men, in Swamp Thing #1 (October /November)
- Tigra, in New Gods #7 (February)

=== Marvel Comics ===
- Adam Warlock, in Marvel Premiere #1 (April)
- Brute (Reed Richards), in Marvel Premiere #2 (May)
- Luke Cage, in Luke Cage, Hero for Hire #1 (June)
- Diamondback (Willis Stryker), in Luke Cage, Hero for Hire #1 (June)
- Dracula, in Tomb of Dracula #1 (April)
- Dragon Lord, in Sub-Mariner #52 (Aug)
- Frank Drake, in Tomb of Dracula #1 (April)
- Damon Dran, in Daredevil #92 (October)
- Elric, in Conan the Barbarian #15 (March)
- Kulan Gath, in Conan the Barbarian #14 (February 1972)
- Ghost Rider (Johnny Blaze), in Marvel Spotlight #5 (August)
- Gibbon, in The Amazing Spider-Man #110 (July)
- Grand Director, in Captain America #153 (September)
- Hammerhead, in The Amazing Spider-Man #113
- Jonas Harrow, in The Amazing Spider-Man #114 (October)
- Mister Fear, in The Mighty Thor #200 (June)
- Night Nurse, in Night Nurse #1 (November)
- Thundra, in Fantastic Four #129 (December)
- Tigra, in The Cat #1 (November)
- Rachel van Helsing, in Tomb of Dracula #3 (July)
- Werewolf by Night, in Marvel Spotlight #2 (February)
- Zarathos, in Marvel Spotlight #5 (August)

=== Independent publishers ===
- Captain Paragon, in Captain Paragon #1 (Paragon Publications)
- Doctor Spektor, in Mystery Comics Digest #5 (Gold Key Comics, July)
- Les Aventures extraordinaires d'Adèle Blanc-Sec, in Pilote magazine #680
- L'omino bufo by Alfredo Castelli - in Il corriere dei ragazzi..
- Gianconiglio (Sonny) by Carlo Peroni – in Il corriere dei piccoli (January)
- Agar, by Claude Moliterni and Robert Gigi - on Il corriere dei piccoli (May)
- Johnny Logan, by Romano Garofalo and Leone Cimpellin – Editoriale Dardo (July)
- Nick Carter, by Bonvi and Guido De Maria – on Gulp (TV show) and Il corriere dei ragazzi (September)
- Zora (vampire), by Renzo Barbieri – Edifumetto (September)
- Biancaneve, by Renzo Barbieri and Rubino Ventura – Edifumetto (November)
