= Fumetti neri =

Comic genre

Subgenres
- Crime, horror, erotica

Fumetti neri (Italian for "black comics") is a subgenre of Italian comics, born in Italy with the creation of the Diabolik character (1962).

== Overview ==
The "Fumetti neri" name comes from "cronaca nera", the Italian name for crime news. Among the inspirations of the genre were the film noir, the French feuilleton and Italian horror films. In a local market dominated by comics devoted to a young audience, the immediate commercial success of Diabolik revealed a niche of adult readers interested in adult and sometimes exploitive themes, characterized by violence and sex references.

The heroes of fumetti neri were more anti-heroes or villains than traditional heroes, and Diabolik himself was very loosely based on the French Fantômas character. The subsequent main characters in these comics were all inspired by Diabolik and often had a K in their names. They included Kriminal (a more violent version of Diabolik by Magnus and Max Bunker), Satanik (a female version of Diabolik by the same authors but with supernatural and horrific elements) and Sadik.

The large success of this genre led in 1965 to public campaigns against them, and even to trials and judicial seizures. As a result, from 1966 some comics remarkably reduced violence and erotic situations, and tried to open themselves to a younger and wider audience, while others, the so-called "vietati ai minori" ("prohibited to minors") exploited their status, increasing the levels of sex, and sometimes becoming openly pornographic. Examples of these more explicit comics are Vampirissimo, Jacula, Hessa, Terror, Messalina, Maghella, Oltretomba, Lucifera, Biancaneve, Vartan, Sukia, Jolanda de Almaviva, Yra, and Frankenstein. By contrast, the surreally erotic Valentina series created by Guido Crepax (in 1965), whose transgressively heroine sports an iconic bob hairstyle inspired by the American film actress and dancer Louise Brooks, as well as Crepax's own wife Luisa, can be seen as a cerebrally refined relative of the fumetti neri genre, which held a widespread appeal to intellectuals of the time.

In France, these comics were published in digest size editions by the likes of Elvifrance. In the Netherlands vast amounts of the erotic comics were published by Schorpioen, Nooitgedacht and Vrijbuiter during the 70s and 80s.

== Legacy ==
It was in the scene set by the fumetti neri that auteur comics (fumetti d'autore) published in magazines such as linus (1965ff.), Il Sergente Kirk (July 1967 – December 1969), Eureka (November 1967 – November 1967), Il Mago (April 1972 – December 1980) and Frigidaire (December 1980ff.)—found a favorable ground for development in Italy in the mid-1960s.
