= Lucifera (comics) =

Italian comic book character

- Panel from Lucifera #14

Publication information
- Publisher: Ediperiodici (1971–1980)
- First comic appearance: Lucifera #1 (October 1971)
- Created by: Giorgio Cavedon (writer); Leone Frollo (artist)

In-story information
- Species: Demon (succubus)

Lucifera is an anti-heroine of the eponymous 1970s Italian comic book, published between 1971 and 1980 by Ediperiodici. The series, along with more well-known series of the era like Isabella and Goldrake, is among those created by Renzo Barbieri and Giorgio Cavedon, published between the late 1960s and early 1970s. The series led to the birth and development of the Italian erotic genre.

== Publication history ==
The Lucifera comic book was published by Ediperiodici and ran for 170 issues from 1971 to 1980. A French edition was also published by Elvifrance and ran for 99 issues from 1972 to 1980.

Lucifera is one of many similar female characters from the Italian fumetti tradition. Other figures from the same era, and with similarly violent or erotic preoccupations, include Zora la Vampira, Maghella, Biancaneve, Vartan, Jacula, Jolanda de Almaviva, Yra, and Sukia.

Ediperiodici, later Edifumetto, published the series, brought with it the birth of the dark erotic genre, and monopolized the market. Other characters with similar characteristics to Lucifera are Zora, Maghella, Biancaneve, Vartan, and Sukia.

Artists who have worked on the Lucifera series include Edoardo Morricone (also known as Morrik, who later worked on other Italian comics such as Biancaneve, Satanik and Djustine), Leone Frollo, Tito Marchioro, Adriana Lobello, Renzo Savi and Manlio Truscia.

== Plot ==
Lucifera is a demoness/succubus dedicated to fighting the forces of Goodness. A frequent visitor to Hell, she also enjoys sending others there to be tormented. Her adventures are full of explicit, if humorous, eroticism and in one scene she is shown fellating the devil. Other storylines involve sado-masochism, executions, impalement and molestation by a giant spider.

On the surface world she inhabits a mythical and violent Europe from the Middle Ages - populated by wenches, knights, and three-headed dragon dogs.
