= Zora (vampire) =

Italian comic book erotic character

The cover to Golden Lady #2.

Zora (Italian: Zora la Vampira) is an Italian comic book erotic character from the 1970s. Zora la Vampira ("Zora the vampiress") is one of many such characters from the Italian fumetti tradition. Other figures from the same era, and with similarly violent or erotic preoccupations, include Maghella, Lucifera, Biancaneve, Vartan, Jacula, Sukia, and Yra.

== History ==
The first comic book was published in 1972. Zora la Vampira was published from 1972 to 1985. With its mixture of sex, horror, violence and nudity, it was one of the Italian adult comics that had come to replace the pulp fiction paperbacks of the 1960s. Zora featured a blond female protagonist who, on some covers, resembles French actress Catherine Deneuve. The series was published by Edifumetto. The cartoonists were Renzo Barbieri and Giuseppe Pederiali as writers and Birago Balzano as artist. Emanuele Taglietti and Alessandro Biffignandi painted the majority of the covers for the series.

Together with the original series, stories of Zora were published also in the comic magazines Orror, I Notturni and Fasma. The series was also published with some success in France, where new stories were produced even after the closing of the series in Italy. A new 13 episodes miniseries of Zora, renamed as "Lady Vampyre", was published in 2001; cartoonists were Paolo Puccini and Daniele Statella.

== Plot ==
The character's real name is Zora Pabst, a 19th-century aristocrat who has been possessed by the spirit of Dracula. She travels her way around the world and even into outer space, satisfying her sexual desires and her lust for blood. Her adventures are a mixture of horror, eroticism, and pornography.

== Legacy ==
A film inspired by the character, also named Zora la Vampira, was released in 2000, directed by the Manetti Brothers.
