= Vartan (comics) =

Italian comic book

Publication information
- Publisher: Furio Viano Editore, 1969 – 1977
- Created by: Furio Viano (writer); Paolo Ghelardini (writer); Sandro Angiolini (artist)

Vartan is an Italian comic book created and drawn by Sandro Angiolini, and published in 200 issues between October 1969 and May 1977 by Furio Viano. An attempt to relaunch the publication in 1980 lasted only six issues. The comic book featured the erotic adventures of its heroine, described as "white Indian", in a classic western setting. The title character's name and features were loosely inspired by French singer and actress Sylvie Vartan, at the time quite popular in Italy thanks to a number of hits and television appearances.

Vartan is one of many such characters from the Italian fumetti tradition. Other female figures from the same era, and with similarly erotic preoccupations, include Zora la Vampira, Maghella, Biancaneve, Lucifera, Jacula, Yra, Jolanda de Almaviva, and Sukia.
