= Maghella =

Italian erotic comic book character

Menelik the first comic book published bearing character Maghella in 1974.

Maghella is an Italian comic book erotic character. A young witch with magic powers, she was created by Dino Leonetti with text by Furio Arrasich.

She made her first appearance as lead character in the erotic series Menelik published in 1974 by Publistrip. The Maghella comic book was started in January 1974, lasting for 140 issues published by Publistrip until March 1981. Later on, 7 issues were published by Ediperiodici from June 1987 to December 1987. The comic books were published also in France.

The girl is identified by two unbraided pigtails of black hair, giant breasts, and unspecified powers and magic, hence her name, meaning "little witch" in Italian. Her most typical exclamation is "Holy Shit", repeated in every adventure: these were also the first words she speaks in the first appearance in Menelik.

Maghella is one of many such characters from the Italian fumetti tradition. Other figures from the same era, and with similarly violent or erotic preoccupations, include Zora la Vampira, Lucifera, Biancaneve, Vartan, Jacula, Jolanda de Almaviva, Sukia, and Yra.

French film director Francis Leroi also adapted the comics series into a 1974 film also titled Maghella. The film remains unreleased to this day.
