= Birago =

Birago is both a surname and a given name. Notable people with the name include:

- Godwin Antwi Birago (born 1988), Ghanaian-Spanish footballer
- Birago Balzano (1936–2022), Italian cartoonist
- Birago Diop (1906–1989), Senegalese poet and storyteller
