= Ombre (film) =

- Directed by: Giorgio Cavedon
- Screenplay by: Giorgio Cavedon
- Story by: Giorgio Cavedon
- Starring: Lou Castel; Monica Guerritore; Laura Belli; Mita Medici
- Cinematography: Erico Menczer
- Edited by: Maria Grazia Dell'Ara
- Music by: Maurizio Sangineto
- Production company: CTP Cineteleproduzioni
- Distributed by: Eurocopfilms
- Release date: 26 June 1980 (Italy)
- Running time: 96 minutes
- Country: Italy

Ombre (transl. Shadows) is a 1980 Italian horror film written and directed by Giorgio Cavedon.

== Cast ==
- Lou Castel as Renato
- Monica Guerritore as Monica
- Laura Belli as Susanna Schumann
- Carlo Bagno as Monica's father
- Antonio Guidi as Schumann
- Elisabetta Odino as Monica
- Mita Medici as Patrizia
- Auretta Gay as Elena
- Ugo Bologna as the professor

== Production ==
Although best known for his erotic fumetto comic series Isabella, director and screenwriter Giorgio Cavedon had worked in the film industry making a documentary in 1953 and having some credits in the early 1960s films including directing part of the Italian comedy anthology film I soldi.

Cavedon began work on Ombre on July 9, 1979. It was filmed on location in Milan and at Icet-De Paolis Studios in Milan. It was originally developed under the working titles Autoritratto (transl. Self-Portrait) and Ritratto di fantasma (transl. Portrait of a Ghost). Some sources have stated that Mario Caiano was a co-director on the film. Caiano has never mentioned working on the film and actor Lou Castel stated that Cavedon was the film's only director.

== Release ==
Ombre was distributed theatrically in Italy by Eurocopfilms on 26 June 1980. The film reportedly only sold 565 tickets in Italy and closed within a week. The film grossed a total of 1,695,000 Italian lire domestically.

== Reception ==
In a contemporary review, Leonardo Autera of Corriere della Sera stated that "Cavedon's direction [...] moves among the stories twists and certain inconsistencies in the script with mixed results." and also negatively commented on the story's slow pace.
