= Yra =

Italian comic book character

Yra the Vampire is the main character from the eponymous series of erotic comic books. She was drawn by Leone Frollo and Rubino Ventura. Her 12-episodes fumetti series, titled Yra, published from 1980 to 1981 in Italy by Edifumetto.

She is shown in the first episode as an innocent young girl, the only daughter of a couple of humble shepherds. Due to her beautiful looks, she gets the unwanted attention of the evil Lord of the Castle, who sends his guards to kidnap her. The story in later episode shows how she turns into a vampire, through an incantation by Romilda, an ugly, centuries-old lesbian witch.

Yra is one of many such characters from the Italian erotic fumetti tradition begun around 1966. Other figures from the same era, and with similarly violent or erotic storylines, include Maghella, Lucifera, Biancaneve, Vartan, Zora la Vampira, Jacula, Sukia and Jolanda de Almaviva.
