= Taglietti =

Taglietti is an Italian surname. Notable people with the surname include:

- Emanuele Taglietti (born 1943), Italian illustrator
- Enrico Taglietti (1926–2019), Italian-born Australian architect
