= Giorgio Cavedon =

Italian publisher, cartoonist and screenwriter

Giorgio Cavedon (17 December 1930 – 14 October 2001) was an Italian publisher, cartoonist and screenwriter. Cavedon was most associated with his adult comics he wrote with Renzo Barbieri. His first comic, Isabella was Italy's first openly erotic fumetto.

== Biography ==
Cavedon was born on 17 December 1930 in Brescia. Outside his work in comics, Cavedon was also an accomplished musician, being a member of the Milan College Jazz Society and had the desire to become a filmmaker. In 1953 he shot a short documentary on 16mm and the next year his short film Arturo was screened at the Cannes Film Festival. Cavedon would casually return to the film industry in the next few years, including Renato Dall'Ara's assistant on Scano Boa and directing a part of the anthology comedy film I soldi.

His comic Isabella was published between April 1966 and October 1976 with 263 issues. The comic was later adapted into a film by Cavedon and directed by Bruno Corbucci in his film Ms. Stiletto. Cavedon and Barbieri created several other comic series following Isabella such as Jacula, Hessa, Lucrezia, Messalina, Lucifera, and Jungla. Barbieri and Cavedon parted ways with Barbieri in 1972 creating his own company which was the biggest rival to Cavedon's group in the 1970s for erotic comics.

Cavedone continued his interest in film, and directed his only feature film with Ombre, shooting it in 1979 and having it released in 1980. Cavedon died in 2001.
