= Ms. Stiletto =

1978 Italian adventure film

- Directed by: Bruno Corbucci
- Screenplay by: Giorgio Cavedon; Mario Amendola; Elisabeth Forster
- Story by: Giorgio Cavedon; Mario Amendola; Elisabeth Forster
- Based on: Isabella, duchessa dei diavoli
- Starring: Brigitte Skay
- Cinematography: Fausto Zuccoli
- Edited by: Luciano Anconetani
- Music by: Sante Romitelli
- Production companies: I.N.D.I.E.F.; Cinesecolo; Houwer-Film, Film- und Fernsehproduktion
- Release date: 1969 (Italy)
- Running time: 93 minutes
- Countries: Italy; West Germany

Ms. Stiletto (Italian: Isabella, duchessa dei diavoli), is a 1969 historical adventure film, directed by Bruno Corbucci. The setting is the Kingdom of France in the early 17th century, while Louis XIII is still underage. An Alsatian baron kills the family of a Duke and claims their Château for himself. The Duke's daughter is rescued by a gypsy tribal leader. Several years later, the girl has become a teenager and seeks revenge.

== Plot ==
Early 17th century, France. Eric von Nutter, a greedy Alsatian baron raids Duke de Frissac's family estate Château Salins and kills his entire family except Isabella, his little daughter. Isabella is saved by Melicour, the head of a gypsy tribe nicknamed The Devils.

Years later, Isabella is a beautiful and courageous teenage girl. By chance, she encounters François de Bassompierre and gets the opportunity to reclaim her title but Château Salins is now possessed by Von Nutter. France is going through political instability under the child king Louis XIII and needs support from German princes. Therefore, Isabella is barred from possession of Château Salins by the Louvre and a young viscount, Gilbert de Villancourt is assigned as a guardian to her. However, following a failed assassination attempt by a minion of Von Nutter, Isabella vows to avenge her family and take Château Salins back.

== Cast ==
- Brigitte Skay as Isabella de Frissac
- Mimmo Palmara as Baron Eric von Nutter
- Fred Williams as Viscount Gilbert de Villancourt
- Mario Novelli as Mayer, Von Nutter's captain
- Enzo Andronico as Von Nutter's sergeant
- Giacomo Furia as Rudolph, the pimp
- Tino Scotti as Melicour
- Sal Borgese as Diego Mendoza
- Alberto Sorrentino as A gypsy
- Gioia Desideri as Susanne, Von Nutter's wife
- Loris Gizzi as M.Llo Bassompierre
- Thomas Astan as Kurt von Nutter
- Renato Baldini as Gunther

== Background ==
Ms. Stiletto is an adaptation of the fumetto Isabella, duchessa dei diavoli, a comic book series by Renzo Barbieri, who created the character of Isabella, and Giorgio Cavedon, who wrote the stories. The comic series became popular in Italy and was Italy's first openly erotic comic strip.

The film was part of a minor trend of comic strip adaptations that emphasised mild sado-masochism and late 1960s fetish gear, which started with Danger: Diabolik and Barbarella.

== Release ==
Ms. Stiletto was released in Italy in 1969. The film was released on home video in the United States under the title Ms. Stiletto in the mid 1980s. As of 2016, the film is only available in the United States through a VHS tape from the Force Video label. Italian film historian and critic described this tape as "badly cropped VHS" that is "sold at a very high price among collectors."

== See also ==
- List of Italian films of 1969
