= Auretta Gay =

Italian actress

- Born: 6 October 1947; Rome, Italy
- Died: 26 November 1996 (aged 49)
- Occupation: Actress
- Years active: 1979–1980

Auretta Gay (6 October 1947 – 26 November 1996) was an Italian actress, whose film career spanned the late 1970s and early 1980s.

== Life ==
Gay was born in Rome, Italy.

She made her film debut in the 1979 horror film, Zombi 2 (also released as Zombie and Zombie Flesh Eaters) by Lucio Fulci, in the role of Susan Barrett. Specifically, Gay became known for a scene in which Gay's character, while scuba diving, is attacked by a zombie and then a bull shark.

Her other film credits include the 1979 musical comedy Brillantina Rock, the 1980 drama Ombre, the historical comedy The Good Thief (Il ladrone), and the television film Delitto in via Teulada, both also in 1980. After these few roles, Auretta Gay's acting career came to a close.

Gay died on 26 November 1996, at the age of 49.
