= Wallestein the Monster =

1970s and 1980s Italian Comic Book

Wallestein the Monster (Italian: Wallestein Il Mostro) was a comic in one of the pocket digests produced by the Italian publisher Edifumetto which appeared on Italian newsstands between 1972 and 1982. Wallestein's world was one in which the Gothic and the contemporary intertwined.

These comics offered readers a heady mix of Gothic horror, fantasy, sex and violence. Ruined castles, deserted cemeteries and grotesque monsters collided with a world of fast cars, guns and glamour in stories that revelled in depictions of sex and violence that were filtered through the symbols and structures of the Gothic imagination.

The series’ narrative revolved around the exploits of the aristocratic Jimmy Wallestein, whose dashing good looks and affluent lifestyle masked a terrifying secret: the real Jimmy was long since dead, and his place had been taken by a beast of terrifying power who wore a special mask to hide its true features. Wallestein the Monster is the name given to the character who uses Jimmy Wallestein's identity and represents an uber-violent, monstrous alter ego.

== Vehicle for Social Commentary ==
Wallestein can be understood as a powerful fantasy figure that spoke to the very human desire to cast off the constraints of civilised society and indulge our most primal and universal urges. His victims were not random, and his actions conformed to a clearly codified moral system that centred around the need to protect and avenge the weak and dispossessed. Wallestein's recurrent subtext revolved around the inability of capitalist societies to prevent the subjugation and exploitation of the weak by the powerful, and it was in this capacity that Wallestein acted as a great leveller of human suffering. His refusal to limit his behaviour can be understood as being emblematic of a wider repudiation of the need to conform to the standards of a society that had long since proved itself incapable of protecting those most in need. In the stories, he avenges those who are victims of crimes, and who have been targeted due to their disenfranchised socio-political position. This vigilante attitude has been likened to that of Bob Kane’s Batman, for both pivot upon a central premise of a playboy millionaire who secretly fights crime in the guise of a secret alter-ego.

== Associated Characters ==
The self-contained nature of the comics meant that the series featured a changing roster of adversaries and opponents. It was the police, in the guise of the bungling Inspector Fleming and Sergeant Blackman, who most frequently acted as the principal antagonists. Fleming and Blackman's obsession with proving his guilt typically blinded them to the very existence of the greater crimes that Wallestein himself was investigating.

A more intermittent antagonistic presence was that of Wallestein's arch-nemesis, the villainous Scorpion. Resplendent in a suit and bowler hat, and usually smoking a large cigar, the Scorpion acted without compunction. He was a controlling force who used a network of lesser criminals to conduct his operations. The Scorpion's visual design created a pictorial link that embedded him firmly within the iconography of capitalism, the adverse social effects of which lay at the heart of Wallestein's thematic construction.

Wallestein was aided in his adventures by two key female characters, the first of whom was his girlfriend Sara Orloff, and the second, his female mentor Olympia Moore. An apparently harmless old woman, Olympia was a mysterious figure who had access to a secret and extensive network of informers and operatives, allowing her to act as a source of privileged information. Often in plots, Olympia simply provided the support and information necessary for Wallestein to complete his mission, but in other stories, she summoned and informed him that a crime had been committed and that vengeance was required. She also played an important role in the character's origin story, as the character who first found and housed the beast following the death of the real Jimmy Wallestein, and the individual who introduced him to the scientist Alice Wolff, who created the special mask with which the beast is able to hide his true appearance.

== Wallestein’s Influences ==
Wallestein shows clear influences from other Italian media of the period and has particularly close links with giallo, the genre of Italian cinema that first appeared during the mid-1960s. Many gialli, such as Mario Bava's iconic Blood and Black Lace, also feature an archetypical image of a killer whose true features are hidden by a mask, trench coat, and gloves, providing a template that matches Wallestein's character design almost exactly. Other genre signifiers, such as frequent scenes of female nudity and brutal, sexualised violence, are similarly common to both giallo and Wallestein. Wallestein's two most famous cover artists, Alessandro Biffignandi and Emanuele Taglietti, used a strikingly similar palette to give their cover paintings a dramatic and intense visual flair that perfectly encapsulated the themes and content of the series. Beyond such cinematic inspirations, Wallestein also exhibited a clear influence from other comics. The character's origin story, for example, focussing as it did on a character whose death precipitates the arrival of an avenging swamp beast, is clearly inspired by Swamp Thing, which premiered in 'DC's House of Secrets #92' in 1971 just months before Wallestein's first issue.

Although the series was successful internationally, with the character appearing in France and South America as well as its native Italy, Wallestein is now largely forgotten in the English-speaking world. It was published in English in the UK by Top Sellers Ltd, a subsidiary of Warner Bros.
