= Graham Humphreys =

British illustrator and visual artist

Humphreys's poster for The Evil Dead, which he designed when 20 years old, was commissioned for the British release of the film. Graham's designs have been credited as being partly responsible for the film's success.

Graham Humphreys is a British illustrator and visual artist best known for producing film posters. During the 1980s, Humphreys worked with Palace Pictures, producing publicity material for films including Dream Demon, Basket Case, The Evil Dead, Evil Dead II, the Nightmare on Elm Street series, Phenomena and Santa Sangre.

Humphreys has worked with The Creative Partnership since the 1990s, and Tartan Films and the British Film Institute's home entertainment label BFI Video since the 2000s. He has been involved in films including Life is Sweet, Erik the Viking, From Dusk till Dawn, House of 1000 Corpses, and Party Monster, as well as numerous releases for BFI Video, including its Short Sharp Shocks collections in the Flipside strand. Other film work includes material for The Pervert's Guide to Cinema and Into the Dark. He also illustrated a poster for In Search of Darkness, a documentary about 1980s horror films.

Humphreys's graphic design for print media includes work published in New Musical Express, Vogue, Esquire, FHM, QX, Arena, Loaded, Junior and F-1 Magazine.

In 2021, Graham Humphreys was commissioned to illustrate a series of record covers of classic horror movie soundtracks such as Carnival Of Souls, The Last Man on Earth and White Zombie, released by Rob Zombie. All the records were pressed on coloured vinyl and housed in special packaging with new artwork by Graham Humphreys.

== Bibliography ==
- Nightmare on One Sheet: The Horror Art of Graham Humphreys. Korero Press, 2023, ISBN 9781912740239
- Hung, Drawn and Executed: The Horror Art of Graham Humphreys. Korero Press, 2019, ISBN 9781912740062
- Drawing Blood: 30 Years of Horror Art. Proud Publishing Ltd, 2015, ISBN 9780993349805
