= Sukia (band) =

American electronic band

- Origin: Camarillo, California, United States
- Genres: Exotica, electronica
- Years active: 1994–1999
- Labels: Nickelbag Records; Mo Wax
- Members: Ross Harris; Craig Borrell; Sasha Fuentes; Henry Marks

Sukia were an American electronic band, based in Camarillo, California, United States, that featured former child actor Ross Harris, who in the 1970s acted in shows such as CHiPS and the Little House on the Prairie, as well as the 1980 satirical comedy film Airplane!

Formed in the early 1990s, amidst the burgeoning Los Angeles indie music scene, Sukia took their name from the Italian vampire comic book of the same name. Their only released album was Contacto Espacial con el Tercer Sexo (1996), which was produced by the Dust Brothers and Jerry Finn, released on the Dust Brothers label, Nickelbag Records in the United States and through Mo Wax Records in the United Kingdom.

Following their dissolution, Sukia have gained a cult following from the release of the above titled album, and also alternate versions of the songs "Gary Super Macho" and "The Dream Machine".
