= Sadik (comics) =

Italian crime comic book series

- Cover of the first issue, March 1965

Publication information
- Genre: Crime-thriller
- Publication date: 1965-1967

Sadik is the title character of an Italian crime comic book series, published between 1965 and 1967.

== Background ==
The comic series was created on the heels of the success of fumetti neri such as Diabolik and Kriminal by Nino Cannata as writer and by "Gian" (generally identified as Gianni Fagioli, but sometimes indicated as Gianni Valente by other sources) as artist. It featured the violent adventures of a black-dressed criminal, Sadik, of his lover Loona, and of their main antagonist, the FBI agent Eddie Castle, inspired for his graphics rendering to French actor Eddie Constantine.

The comic book debuted in March 1965, and it got an immediate success, selling over 100,000 copies. After the second issue, the editor Nino Del Buono, scared because of the censorship and the judicial seizure hitting similar magazines decided to suspend publication and eventually sold the magazine to Edizioni Antares. In 1966 the magazine was acquired by Edizioni Alhambra. It eventually closed in December 1967.

Reissues were published in 1971-1972 and in 1989–1990.

The character was featured in a segment of the film Thrilling directed by Gian Luigi Polidoro and starring Walter Chiari.
