= Fernando Carcupino =

Italian artist

- Born: Fernando Nusci Carcupino; 23 July 1922; Naples, Italy
- Died: 22 March 2003 (aged 80); Milan. Italy
- Education: Accademia di Belle Arti di Brera
- Occupations: Painter, illustrator, comics artist

Fernando Carcupino (23 July 1922 – 22 March 2003) was an Italian painter, illustrator and comics artist. He was most widely known for his female nudes, but he also painted landscapes, still lifes, historical subjects, and portraits of mothers and their children. In his early career he worked as a comics artist for Asso di Picche.

== Life and career ==
Carcupino was born in Naples to a Milanese family who were temporarily working there. He grew up in Milan and studied art under Achille Funi at the city's Accademia di Belle Arti di Brera. During World War II, he worked in the animation department for the film La Rosa di Bagdad before serving as a sub-lieutenant in the Granatieri Brigade of the Italian Liberation Corps.

In 1946, after producing the episode "Scacco matto a Coe" for the comics series Il Solitario, he joined his friend Mario Faustinelli on the staff of Asso di Picche and became part of the so-called Gruppo di Venezia (Venice Group) which also included the comic artists and writers Hugo Pratt, Dino Battaglia and Damiano Damiani. Another 1940s comics series illustrated by Carcupino was Il figlio della notte written by Andrea Lavezzolo. It was republished in 1975 as a single book by Grandi Avventure. Carcupino travelled widely in Northern Europe during the 1950s while also beginning a career as an illustrator. He worked primarily for the Mondadori publications, Epoca, Grazia, and Confidenze, but also for the Milanese satirical magazine La Settimana Umoristica. In the early 1970s he produced female nudes for the covers of the weekly erotic magazine, La Giraffa, as well as creating the covers for several Edifumetto publications including I Notturni, Sexy Favole, Lo Scheletro, Il Vampiro, and Vampirissimo.

From the mid-1970s until his death, Carcupino primarily dedicated himself to painting, producing landscapes, still lifes, mother and child portraits, and female nudes—the subject for which he was most widely known. He died in Milan on 22 March 2003 at the age of 80. Retrospective exhibitions of his work were held the following year at the Centro per l'arte contemporanea Luigi Pecci in Prato and at the Palazzo Cusano in Cusano Milanino where Carcupino had lived from 1946 until the mid-1950s. His work is held in many private collections and in the permanent collection of the Galleria d'arte Gelmi in Milan.

== Published works ==
- Sex and Horror: The Art of Fernando Carcupino. Korero Press, 2019, ISBN 9781912740031.
