= Roberto Baldazzini =

Italian illustrator and comics artist

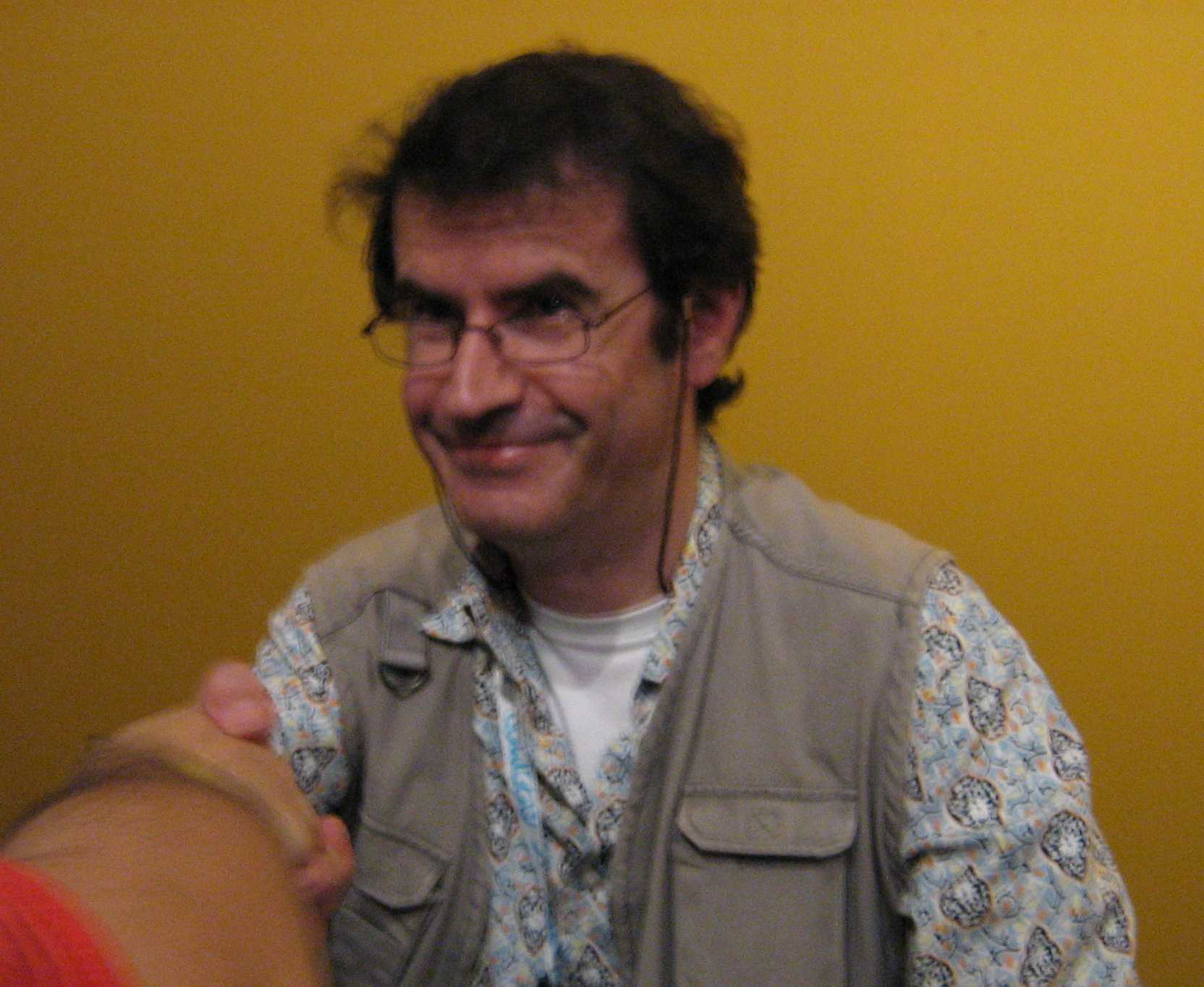
Roberto Baldazzini at Comicon 2007, Naples

Roberto Baldazzini (born August 18, 1958) is an Italian illustrator and comics artist who specializes in writing and illustrating black and white and full-color erotic comic books.

He received a formal education in commerce, after which he took several art courses and, in 1980, he founded Pinguino, for which he created the character Ronnie Fumoso, based on material that was written by Daniele Brolli. His first professional work was his illustration of Brolli's Alan Hassad series, which was published in Italian Orient Express comics magazine in 1980. Since then, he has created numerous other characters, has created advertising art, and has been featured in Penthouse Comix and many other well-known publications.

Although some of his work is executed as simple line drawings that he sometimes colors, others—especially, his pinups—are realistic, fully detailed illustrations or paintings.

One of his few non-erotic works is the critically acclaimed graphic novel L'inverno di Diego (Diego's Winter) about partisans in Italy during World War II.

In 2017 he teamed up with Korero Press to produce a monograph of his work titled Mondo Erotica.

== Casa HowHard ==
His works include Casa HowHard, which tells anecdotes about the sexual adventures of an apartment full of transsexual residents. Everyone in the building, including the janitor, is a transsexual, who has a feminine face, breasts, a womanly derrière, and male genitals. Readers seem either to appreciate the art and to enjoy the stories or to find the former too simple and the latter too silly. The comic book is introduced by Moebius, who suggests that its characters exhibit a “guiltless innocence,” which creates a sense of fun rather than of debauchery.

Casa HowHard was followed with 4 sequels: Casa HowHard 2, Casa HowHard 3, Casa HowHard 4 and Casa HowHard 5.

== Bayba: the 110 BJ’s ==
Baldazzini has also written and illustrated Bayba: the 110 BJ’s, in which the title character, a nymphomaniac transsexual sex slave who lives to please men, transforms herself from a slender youth with a boyish figure into a well-endowed, womanly transsexual by applying a high-tech hormonal crème to her chest and then sets out on a self-imposed mission to satisfy as many men as she can by any means possible. Other than their genitals, her partners are seldom shown and rarely speak. When their faces are shown, they have the appearance of anthropomorphic pigs.

Bayba undergoes a sex-change operation and then enters the Ultimate Bitch contest, the cash prize for the winning of which is large enough that it would allow her to acquire her “freedom” to select her own sexual companions. To win, a contestant must break the previously established record by sexually satisfying 110 men in a single day by performing fellatio on them. However, she does not limit herself only to this method of satisfying her partners, and the comic book contains several scenes that have BDSM themes.

== Other works ==
Baldazzini has also written and illustrated other erotic comic books, some of which feature transsexual characters, including pinups and such titles as:

- Beba
- Chiara Rosenberg
- Ombre D’Amore
- Risvegli
- Shedom
- Stella Norris
- Sweet Suzy
- Trans/EST
- Who Killed Betty
- 31-12-1999

== Selected bibliography ==
=== English editions ===
- Mondo Erotica, 2017, Korero Press
- Hurricane (with Lorena Canossa), 1991, Catalan Communications
- Casa HowHard, 2001, NBM
- She-Dom, The Awakening of Clara Rosenberg (with Celestino Pes), 2002, Eros Comix
- Casa HowHard 3, 2004, NBM
- Bayba - The 110bg’s, 2005, NBM
- Beba – Red Domina, 2006, NBM
- Casa HowHard 4, 2007, NBM
- Lady Brown, 2008, NBM
- Casa HowHard 5, 2010, NBM
