= Birago Balzano =

Italian caricaturist (1936–2022)

Birago Balzano (5 January 1936 – 25 March 2022) was a leading Italian cartoonist who was the designer and illustrator of the adult horror character Zora.

== Biography ==
Born in Trinitapoli, in the southern region of Apulia, Italy, when Balzano was a teenager he moved to Milan, where he attended the Brera Academy and then the Cimabue Art Institute; he debuted as a cartoonist in 1964, drawing the last five albums of the western series Capitan Audax published by Editoriale Corno together with Sergio Montipò, with whom he will also produce Cap Il Fumetto Capellone, comic series published by ErreGI since 1966 to 1967. Since 1972 he collaborates with Edifumetto realizing the adult series Zora, about a female vampire, written by Giuseppe Pederiali and of which he will be the main draftsman of the entire series published until 1985. In the sixties he made stories of the western series Capitan Miki published by Editoriale Dardo e Piccolo Ranger and Un ragazzo nel Far West published by Edizioni Audace.
