= Captain Kate =

Fictional Comic Character

Captain Kate drawn by Jerry & Hale Skelly 1968 (Italian version)

Captain Kate, is a US newspaper comic strip created by Jerry and Hale Skelly. Captain Kate was Kate Stevens, a female captain/owner of a trading ship, the Wind Song, in the late 18th century. The comic, written by Jerry's wife Hale Skelly, was distributed by King Features from May 28, 1967, to May 21, 1972.
