= Sandro Angiolini =

Italian comics creator

Sandro Angiolini (6 June 1920 – 15 October 1985) was an Italian comics creator. He was born and died in Milan.

== Biography ==
In 1966, he was the first to illustrate one of Italy's most important adult comics, Isabella, written by Renzo Barbieri and Giorgio Cavedon. He was also involved in the creation of Goldrake, Vartan, Una, Belzeba and La Poliziotta.

Amongst the group of Italian artists who created comic strips for adults between the 1960s and 1970s, (which had become increasingly pornographic by the eighties), the style of Sandro Angiolini stands out. This style originally owed much to Milton Caniff, one of his initial sources of inspiration, but followed a clear and marked line of development, parallel to the development of Italian fumetti, but unique. Characters are drawn in a sometimes simplistic fashion with an emphasis on essential features and strong expressions to complement and move the narration forward.

A prolific artist, he has created illustrations for the most varied types of publication, and in periods of most intense activity was known, with the help of some colleagues, to produce two pocket books full of art in a month, amounting to 460 panels in two stories.
