= Leone Frollo =

Italian comic book artist (1931–2018)

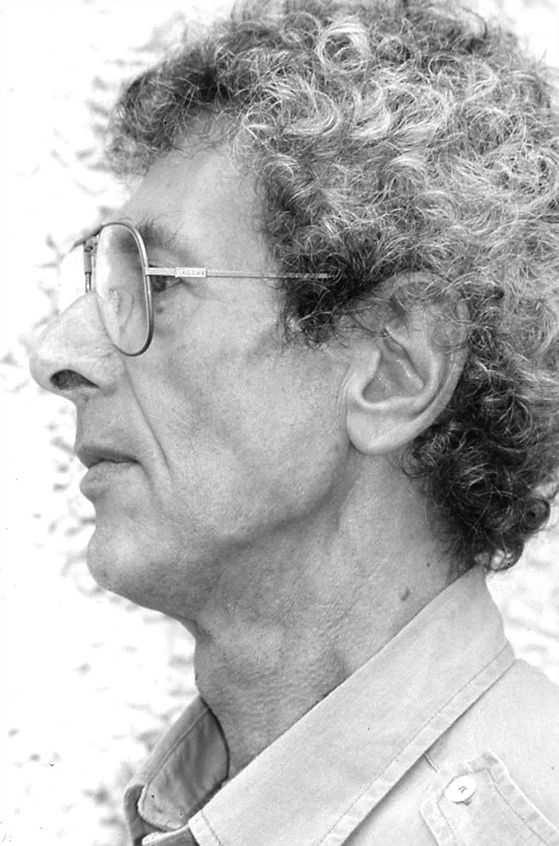
Leone Frollo

Leone Frollo (9 April 1931 – 17 October 2018) was an Italian comic book artist.

== Biography ==
Frollo was born in Venice. He debuted in 1948 with a western called Sui Grandi Laghi (On Great Lakes). From 1958 to 1968, he worked for London agency Fleetway, doing war stories. After that, until the mid-1980s he did works in several genres, including fantasy and horror, but specially erotic comics. His main work in the erotic genre in this period is Biancaneve, based on Snow White, Lucifera and Yra, which he did for Edifumetto.

After 1987, he changed his style and drew some series for the French market: Malicieusement Femmes, Mona Street and Diva. Mona Street, the erotic adventures of a young American lady, just graduated from college in Boston, set in the first decade of the 20th century, was Frollo's last comic work.

After abandoning comics, Frollo dedicated himself to erotic work, doing illustrations on paper with watercolour, pencil, and pastels.
