= Cadit quaestio =

Latin legal expression

Cadit quaestio is a Latin expression that is used as a legal term and in some other contexts. The expression literally translates as 'the question falls'. In legal contexts, cadit quaestio is used to indicate that an issue is no longer in question, often because a dispute (question) between two parties has been either settled or dropped.

== cq copy-editing mark ==
As a mark in copy editing, cq or c.q. implies that the accuracy of a statement, fact, etc., has been verified. It is usually placed in a draft article by the writer, to the attention of the copy editor. The precise origin of the term is uncertain, but cq was identified as the shorthand form of correct in the 1879 Phillips Code, a set of abbreviations used in the transmission of press reports via telegraph, first published in 1879. Alternative explanations of the origin include an abbreviation for cadit quaestio, indicating that the issue is "no longer in question", and an abbreviation for correct as quoted, which serves as a useful mnemonic. Cq is a mark for internal use only, intended for removal prior to publishing. It should be distinguished from the unrelated mark sic, used in published pieces to indicate that a quote has been transcribed verbatim, without correction of perceived errors in the original source.

== See also ==
- c.q., from Latin casu quo, 'in which case; in particular'; primarily used in the Dutch language
