= Cauchemar =

#REDIRECT Incubus

- With possibilities: This is a redirect from a title that potentially could be expanded into a new article. The topic described by this title may be more detailed than is currently provided on the target page or in a section of that page.
  - When the target page becomes too large, or for any reason a new page would be an improvement, this redirect may be replaced with an article, template or other project page that is carved out of the target page. See also {{R to section}} and use together with this rcat when appropriate.
  - If the topic of the redirect is not susceptible to expansion, then use other rcats such as {{R to section}} or {{R to list entry}} when appropriate.
  - Since a new page may be created, links to this redirect should not be replaced with a direct link to the target page. To make redirects to this page, use {{R avoided double redirect}}.
  - {{R printworthy}} should be used together with this template when applied to a redirect in mainspace.
  - When used on a template redirect, it will automatically populate Category:Template redirects with possibilities.

Cauchemar may refer to:

== Film and television ==
- A Nightmare (Le cauchemar), an 1896 silent film directed by Georges Méliès
- Le Cauchemar, a 1969 film directed by Jean-Jacques Rousseau

== Literature ==
- Le Cauchemar, an 1837 play by Joanny Augier
- "Cauchemar", a poem by Paul Verlaine in the 1866 collection Poèmes saturniens
- Un cauchemar, a 1984 novel by Jean-Jacques Brochier

== Music ==
- Vladimir Cauchemar (born 1978), French DJ
- "Cauchemar", an 1896 work by Francisco Braga
- "Cauchemar", from the 1996 album Hot Loser
- "Cauchemar", from the 2007 album Dangereuse Attraction
- "Cauchemar", from the 2009 album Le Cheshire Cat et moi
- "Cauchemar", a 2015 song by Alonzo
- "Cauchemar", from the 2016 album Demoniak

== Paintings ==
- Cauchemar, a 19th century painting by Louis Janmot
- Le Cauchemar, a 1950 painting by Émile Chambon

== Other ==
- Cauchemar, horse who won the 1841 Prix Daru
