= The People's Comics =

1972 underground comic book

- Cover of The People's Comics, art by Robert Crumb.

Publication information
- Publisher: Golden Gate Publishing Company (first printing); Kitchen Sink Press (second through seventh printings)
- Schedule: Seven printings
- Format: One-shot
- Genre: Underground Satire
- Publication date: September 1972
- No. of issues: 1

Creative team
- Written by: Robert Crumb; Harvey Pekar (back cover feature)
- Artist: Robert Crumb

Collected editions
- The Complete Crumb Comics #8: The Death of Fritz the Cat: ISBN 1-56097-076-6

The People's Comics is a single-issue underground comic book drawn and written largely by Robert Crumb, with a young Harvey Pekar writing a back cover feature. The book is notable for containing the death sequence of Fritz the Cat following Crumb's disappointment with Ralph Bakshi's 1972 film involving the character.

== Publication history ==
Terry Zwigoff's Golden Gate Publishing Company published the original printing of the comic. Zwigoff soon sold his company's printing rights to Kitchen Sink Press, which published the following six printings.

== Reception ==
Underground comix database Comixjoint gave The People's Comics an 8/10 rating, calling the writing "excellent" and the illustration "exceptional". Writer M. Steven Fox noted of the book's stories that "Beyond "Fritz the Cat, Superstar", the insightful "Confessions of R. Crumb" provides plenty to chew on. Crumb conveys a dreadful world filled with appalling people, mundane exercises, inescapable forces and compulsive obsessions, and how living on this planet fucks us up from the day we're born".
