= Korero Press =

British publishing company

- Country of origin: United Kingdom
- Headquarters location: London
- Distribution: Turnaround
- Publication types: Books
- Nonfiction topics: pop culture, illustration, erotica and horror
- Official website: www.koreropress.com

Korero Press is a London-based art book publisher. Its list of books mainly includes pop culture, street art, erotica and horror titles. It has published books by contemporary artists Ron English, Patrick J. Jones and Graham Humphreys. Korero Press distribute their books to traditional bricks and mortar bookshops, and sell directly from their website.

Korero Press accepts submissions for publication, but its focus is on lowbrow and pop surrealism, pop culture and art, in particular kustom kulture, illustration, erotica and horror.

The Korero Press website contains interviews with published artists, including Derek Yaniger, Emanuele Taglietti, Roberto Baldazzini, Jim Phillips, Patrick J. Jones and Ron English.

Korero Press is unusual among publishers in having its very own cocktail, the El Korero, a tiki drink created by professional mixologists Kelly Reilly and Tom Morgan, authors of The Home Bar Guide to Tropical Cocktails.
