= Emanuele Taglietti =

Italian illustrator (born 1943)

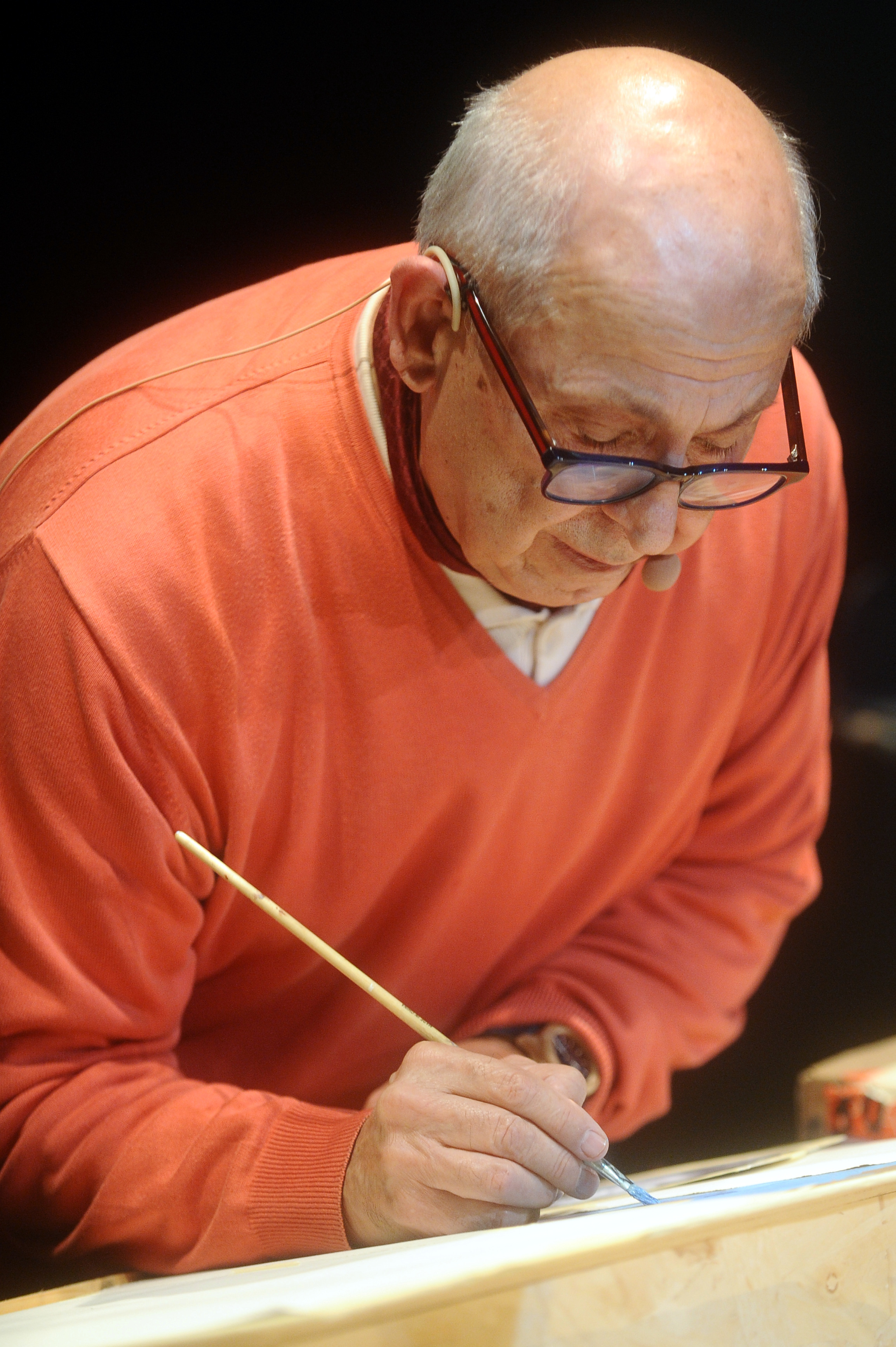
- Emanuele Taglietti at Lucca Comics & Games 2018
- Born: 6 January 1943 (age 83); Ferrara, Italy
- Known for: Illustration; painting

Emanuele Taglietti (born 6 January 1943) is an Italian illustrator, mostly known for his covers for digest-sized adult comics, whose themes were sex, violence and horror.

== Biography ==
Emanuele Taglietti was born on 6 January 1943 in Ferrara, Emilia-Romagna, Italy. His father, Otello, was a painter and a decorator. In the 1960s, Otello Taglietti worked as a set designer on movies made by his cousin, acclaimed director Michelangelo Antonioni, who would often take Emanuele with him on the set.

After attending a local art school, Emanuele Taglietti studied design at the Experimental Centre of Cinematography, in Rome. He went on to work as decorator and assistant director in around thirty movies, including Federico Fellini's Juliet of the Spirits, Dino Risi's Dirty Weekend, and others.

By the early 1970s, the popularity in Italy of the digest-sized fumetti comics, whose themes were mostly sex, violence and horror, was at its peak. Taglietti moved on to work as an illustrator for Edifumetto, the biggest publisher of fumetti in Italy. He painted more than 500 covers for such books as Zora the Vampire, Sukia, Mafia, 44 Magnum and Wallestein the Monster. At the time, Taglietti would often paint more than ten covers every month for Renzo Barbieri's publishing house.

By the end of the 1980s, the comics' popularity started to weaken, and Taglietti left Edifumetto to work as an oil painter, as well as an evening-class teacher in decoration and the conservation of murals. When Taglietti asked to have his original works back from publisher Barbieri, in 1988, he was told that all the originals had been stolen and that tempera works used as covers for their adult comic series by publishing house Edifumetto were missing. The whereabouts of the art works was never clarified. An investigation undertaken by Taglietti and Alessandro Biffignandi, who also had his paintings stolen, had to be abandoned for financial reasons. In 2000, he retired from teaching, continuing to work as a murals and watercolour painter. In 2016 he started painting comic covers again for a company called Annexia as well taking up the odd illustration job.

== Books ==
- Taglietti, Emanuele (1 April 2015). Sex and Horror: The Art of Emanuele Taglietti. Korero Press. p. 160. ISBN 978-0957664944.
- Emanuele Taglietti by Luca Mencaroni. Mencaroni Editore (Bari, 2019), ISBN 8899397147

== See also ==
- Clandestine literature
- Erotic art
- Pulp magazine
- Sexual arousal
