= Edifumetto =

Italian publishing house of comics

- Status: Defunct (1993)
- Founded: 1972; 53 years ago in Italy
- Founder: Renzo Barbieri
- Country of origin: Italy
- Headquarters location: Milan
- Publication types: fumetti
- Fiction genres: Adventure, Horror, Sex
- Imprints: SEGI

Edifumetto was an Italian publishing house of comics, founded by Renzo Barbieri. It was started in 1972 and folded in 1993. The majority of their publications were digest- or pocket-sized adult comics known in Italy as fumetti. Popularity peaked in the mid 1970s when they were selling millions of comics each month. Their success was due in large part to the elaborate cover illustrations, rendered by classically trained painters such as Alessandro Biffignandi, Emanuele Taglietti, Pino Dangelico, Fernando Carcupino, Roberto Molino, Carlo Jacono, Averardo Ciriello or Enzo Sciotti.

== Publications ==
Here is a list of some of their notable series titles, the most successful being Biancaneve and vampire-themed titles like Zora and Sukia.

- 44 Magnum (1984; 10 issues)
- Attualita Flash (1984–89; 63 issues)
- Attualita Nera
- Belzeba (1972–77; 30 issues)
- Biancaneve (Snow White) by Leone Frollo (1972–78; 94 issues)
- Candida (1972–74; 22 issues)
- Cenerentola (Cinderella)
- Cimiteria (Of The Cemetery) (1977–84; 119 issues)
- Cronaca Nuda (Naked Chronicles) (1987–90; 40 issues)
- Doctor Barnard (1976–77; 12 issues)
- Fasma (1985–86; 7 issues)
- Fiabe Proibite (Prohibited Fairytales)
- Fox (1986–87; 11 issues)
- Frankenstein (1976–77; 16 issues)
- Karzan (1975–78; 39 issues)
- I Libri Della Luce Rossa (1981–85; 53 issues)
- Mafia (1979–84; 77 issues)
- Misteria (1984–85; 8 issues)
- Necron by Magnus (1981)
- Playcolt (1972–79; 128 issues)
- La Poliziotta (The Policewoman) by Renzo Barbieri, Sandro Angiolini, Franco Tarantola, Pierluigi Lighezzolo, Enrico Teodorani and Silvano Calligari (1980–88; 88 issues)
- I Sanguinari (The Bloodthirsty)
- Scandali
- Sbarre
- Sexy Favole (Sexy Fables)
- Strega (Witch) (1988–89; 14 issues)
- Sukia by Nicola del Principe (1977–86; 153 issues)
- Tabu (1973–78; 50 issues)
- Top (1974–76; 19 issues)
- Vampirissimo (1972–80; 98 issues)
- Vipera Bionda (The Blonde Viper)
- Wallestein the Monster (1972–80; 123 issues)
- Ulula (Howls) (1981–84; 36 issues)
- Yra by Leone Frollo and Rubino Ventura (1980–81)
- Zora la Vampira by Giuseppe Pederiali and Balzano Biraghi (1972–85; 247 issues)
- Zorro (1976; 13 issues)
