= Elvifrance =

French comic book publisher

Elvifrance was a French comic book publisher.

== Bibliography ==
- Bier, Christophe (2018). Pulsions graphiques: Elvifrance, 1970-1992. Paris: Cernunnos. ISBN 978-2-37495-124-9.
