= Biancaneve =

1972 erotic comic book by Renzo Barbieri and Rubino Ventura

Publication information
- Publisher: Edifumetto
- Format: Ongoing series
- Publication date: 1972–1986
- No. of issues: 94

Creative team
- Written by: Renzo Barbieri; Giuseppe Pederiali
- Artist(s): Leone Frollo, Alessandro Biffignandi

Biancaneve is an Italian erotic comic book, created in 1972 by Renzo Barbieri and Rubino Ventura (pseudonym of Giuseppe Pederiali) and illustrated by Leone Frollo.

The series, published by Edifumetto, was based on Snow White and the Seven Dwarfs. However, it soon lost most of its connections with the original story. The series chronicles the sexual adventures of the title character in a world of magic and monsters. Biancaneve (Snow White) remains a virgin under attack during the first four issues of the series. After losing her virginity in volume 5, she becomes increasingly addicted to sex.

The comic has lasted for 94 issues, distributed in four series: #1-2, #1-12, #1-12, #1-68. It has also been published in other countries, like France, where it was published as Contes malicieux, by Elvifrance, and Brazil, where it was published as Branquela, by Idéia Editoral (a subsidiary of Editora Três), and Denmark, where it was published as Snehvide og de 7 frække dværge, by Forlaget Holme (a subsidiary of Interpresse).

Alessandro Biffignandi painted all the covers for the series, claiming it was his favorite title to work on.

The comics inspired two films, La principessa sul pisello (1976), directed by Piero Regnoli and starring Susanna Martinková, and Biancaneve & Co (1982), directed by Mario Bianchi and featuring starlet Michela Miti with Oreste Lionello, Gianfranco D'Angelo and Aldo Sambrell. The latter was also released in English as Snow White and 7 Wise Men.
