= Isabella (comics) =

Italian comic book series

Creative team
- Written by: Giorgio Cavedon
- Artist(s): Sandro Angiolini

Isabella (Italian: Isabella Duchessa dei Diavoli, i.e. "Isabella Duchess of the Devils") is an Italian comic book series created by Giorgio Cavedon as the writer and Sandro Angiolini as artist.

== History ==
The series started in 1966 and it was inspired in plot and title by the renowned novel Angélique, the Marquise of the Angels and its on-screen adaptation, which had had a significant success at the Italian box office. Set in 17th century France, it features the adventures of Isabella de Frissac, an uninhibited noblewoman who works as a secret agent for cardinal Richelieu and, in the course if her missions, faces any sort of vexation and torture.

The series is considered a progenitor of Italian adult comics, especially because of its sado-masochistic elements, which were an absolute innovation in the fumetti panorama. The storylines also included grotesque situations, such as a scene in episode 8 which depicted the protagonist being raped by a bear.

Starting from July 1969 Gaspare De Fiore and Umberto Sammarini replaced Angiolini as artists. Publications ceased in October 1976, after 263 issues.

A comic book collection series, Isabella Gigante was published between 1969 and 1971.

== Legacy ==
A film adaptation, Isabella, Duchess of the Devils, directed by Bruno Corbucci and starring Brigitte Skay in the title role, was released in 1969.

The comic book also inspired a series of novels, Le memorie di Isabella.
