= Jacula (comics) =

Italian comic book character

Jacula #273, "Beniamino Il Meccanico" ("Benjamin the Mechanic").

Jacula is the title character of an Italian eponymous erotic-horror fumetti series.

== History ==
The character first appeared in a supporting role in the comic series Isabella.

A total of 327 issues of Jacula were produced between 1969 and 1982. Reissues of stories were published between 1973 and 1984 in the series Jacula Collezione.

== Plot ==
In common with Zora and Sukia, the series contained strong sexual imagery: together with her vampire husband Carlo Verdier, the predatory Jacula seduced the unwary and corrupted the innocent. She was also married to a human called Torlin Novak, and the relationship resulted in a child whose soul was promptly pledged to Satan.
