= Alessandro Biffignandi =

Italian illustrator

- Born: 8 October 1935; Rome, Italy
- Died: 22 January 2017 (aged 81–82)
- Known for: Illustration; painting

Alessandro Biffignandi (8 October 1935 – 22 January 2017) was an Italian illustrator, mostly known for his covers for digest-sized, adult comics whose themes were sex, violence, and horror.

== Biography ==
Alessandro Biffignandi was born in 1935 in Rome, Italy. As a child, he was a comics fan, reading titles such as Topolino, an Italian, digest-sized comic series featuring Disney comics, and subsequently getting interested in their drawings. In 1954, he was accepted as a student in the studio of Averardo Ciriello, a movie theater billboard designer.

After moving on to work for a while for the brothers Enzo and Giuliano Nistri, who also produced movie theater advertising, Biffignandi was hired by the studio of Augusto Favalli, at the time Italy's biggest producer of movie posters.

In 1958 (or 1960), Biffignandi moved to Milan and joined the art agency of Rinaldo Dami (aka Roy D'Ami), which was producing comic strips for the British market on assignment from Fleetway, DC Thomson, and others.

By the early 1970s, the popularity in Italy of the digest-sized fumetti comics whose themes were mostly sex, violence, and horror, was at its peak. Biffignandi started doing covers for Renzo Barbieri, the founder and owner of Edifumetto, the highly successful publisher of fumetti, where he was eventually drawing between ten and twenty paintings every month, creating overall hundreds of covers. From 1984 onwards, Biffignandi concentrated on magazine and book covers and illustrations, also doing oil paintings on commission.

He died on 22 January 2017, a few months after Korero Press published a retrospective of his life's work.
