= Renzo Barbieri =

- Born: 10 March 1940 Milan, Kingdom of Italy
- Died: 23 September 2007 (aged 67)
- Notable works: Edifumetto; Manual for Playboys; Sukia
- Awards: List of awards

Renzo Barbieri (10 March 1940 – 23 September 2007) was an author and editor of Italian comics as well as the founder of the publishing house Edifumetto. In 1980 he wrote Il Manuale del Playboy (Manual for Playboys), a textbook about where European playboys live, what cars they drive, and other lifestyle tips.

== Biography ==
=== The Beginning ===
Barbieri was born in Milan, Italy. In the early 1960s he started collaborating with comics publishers like Editoriale Dardo and Edizioni Alpe. He was also a journalist for the tabloid La Notte. In the mid-1960s, after reading a rather violent White Cartoon French book, he decided to open a publishing house in Milan and developed the idea of "pocket comics", also known as a digest. This was a time when the adult black comics genre (Diabolik, Kriminal and Satanik), a series of paperback featuring graphic violence and scantily-clad women, was at its peak. In 1966 he created Editore 66, inspired by film and literary subjects of the time (such as Angelica and James Bond) and developed the plots of his first two comics books, Isabella and Grendizer (both illustrated by Sandro Angiolini).

Initially slightly erotic in terms of contents, the books became progressively more pornographic towards the end of the 1970s, reflecting the sexual revolution and the increasing permissiveness in the press and in film taking place in Italy at the time. Images like a bare breast which in the mid-1960s would have been scandalous suddenly looked almost chaste and innocent.

=== Erregi ===
In 1967 Barbieri partnered with Giorgio Cavedon, and together they founded the publishing house ErreGi. They went on to create other sexy-heroines like Jacula, Lucrezia, Messalina, Hessa, De Sade, Lucifera, Jolanda, Vartan, Walalla, Yra, Jungle and Bonnie. In 1972, as a result of creative differences and the need to reinvest the capital to cope with the rising competition in erotic comics, Barbieri and Cavedon separated and formed their own companies. Cavedon retained all the popular existing titles and renamed ErreGi Ediperiodici. Barbieri founded Edifumetto.

=== Edifumetto ===
Under the new banner of Edifumetto, Barbieri created some of the most notable titles of the horror and soft porn comics genre, including Zora la Vampira, Rolando del Fico, Cimiteria, Vampiro, Scheletro, Sukia Belzeba, Playcolt, Mafia, Poppea, Necron, and dozens of other characters. Their success was due in large part to the covers painted by classically trained artists such as Alessandro Biffignandi, Emanuele Taglietti, Roberto Molino, Pino Dangelico, Enzo Sciotti, and Carlo Jacono. Within a few years Edifumetto was publishing a new edition almost every day (and doubled in the summer with special supplements).

To diversify the brand, Barbieri created other publishing ventures, including Edizioni GEIS, SEGI, Il Vascello, Centroedizioni, Squalo Comics, Renzo Barbieri Editore, and produced time-sensitive comics like Il Paninaro, Skate Map and Il Leghista. Barbieri's last company, Edifumetto 3000, folded in the early 2000s.

== Bibliography ==
Series dedicated to vampirism:

- Jacula (1969), originally published by Erregi until 1982, with a total of 327 books.
- Zora la vampira, published from 1972 to 1985, stories by Giuseppe Pederiali, drawings by Birago Balzano, Gianni Pinaglia and Pino Antonelli for a total of 288 books and 12 special editions.
- Sukia conceived by Nicholas Prince, published from 1977 to 1986, with a total of 150 books.
- Yra designed by Leone Frollo, written by Ruby Ventura. Published from 1980 to 1981.
- Il Manuale del Play Boy, Centroedizioni, Milan, 1980.

== Sources ==
- Sex and Horror: The Art of Emanuele Taglietti, ©2014 Korero Press.
- Sex and Horror: The Art of Alessandro Biffignandi, ©2016 Korero Press.
