= Sukia =

Italian comic book series

Publication information
- Publisher: Edifumetto
- Format: Magazine
- Publication date: 1978–1986
- No. of issues: 153

Creative team
- Written by: Nicola del Principe; Renzo Barbieri
- Artist(s): Nicola del Principe; Flavio Bozzoli; Emanuele Taglietti (cover artist)

Sukia was a vampire-themed Italian comics series by Renzo Barbieri and Flavio Bozzoli published by Edifumetto from 1978 to 1986, for a total of 153 albums and 6 extra albums. In the series Sukia faces people or creatures who are trying to do some form of harm to the world or other. Sukia is displayed as an antihero since she at times helps people fight crimes against humanity or committing crimes for personal gain. Each issue usually was self-contained.

The physical characteristics of Sukia are said to have been inspired by the looks of the actress Ornella Muti.

Emanuele Taglietti painted numerous covers for the series.

The series was published in Italy, Germany, France, Spain, Brazil, Belgium and in Latin America where the series was published in Colombia and distributed all over Latin America. The Latin American version of the series can also be found in North America. In Brazil it was printed under the title "Vampi".

The Californian electronic band Sukia took its name from this comic book.

== Main characters ==
- Sukia Dragomic/Smith/McNought, the main character of the series. Sukia is a descendant of the Counts Dragomic who originate from Transylvania. She died in the 13th century and was accidentally resurrected in 1724. Sukia then moved to America and died again in 1801. She now lives in New York City, In the first issue of the collection Sukia married William McNought and then killed him and inherited his name and fortune. Sukia was affected by vampirism which was passed to her by her father, Drakul Dragomic, who tried to rape and kill her.
- Gary, Sukia's young, loyal servant, who is always with Sukia in most of her adventures and is always there when she needs him. He is a homosexual to the last degree and is always looking for sex. Over the course the series his appearance changes dramatically (at the beginning of the series he is a twink, but he becomes older with a more muscular build).
- Bill Thomas, a journalist who is determined to expose Sukia as a vampire to the mainstream public. He is the main antagonist of Sukia through the series. He is also torn between his love for Sukia and the hatred he has for her.
