= Napoli Comicon =

Comic book and gaming festival based in Naples, Italy

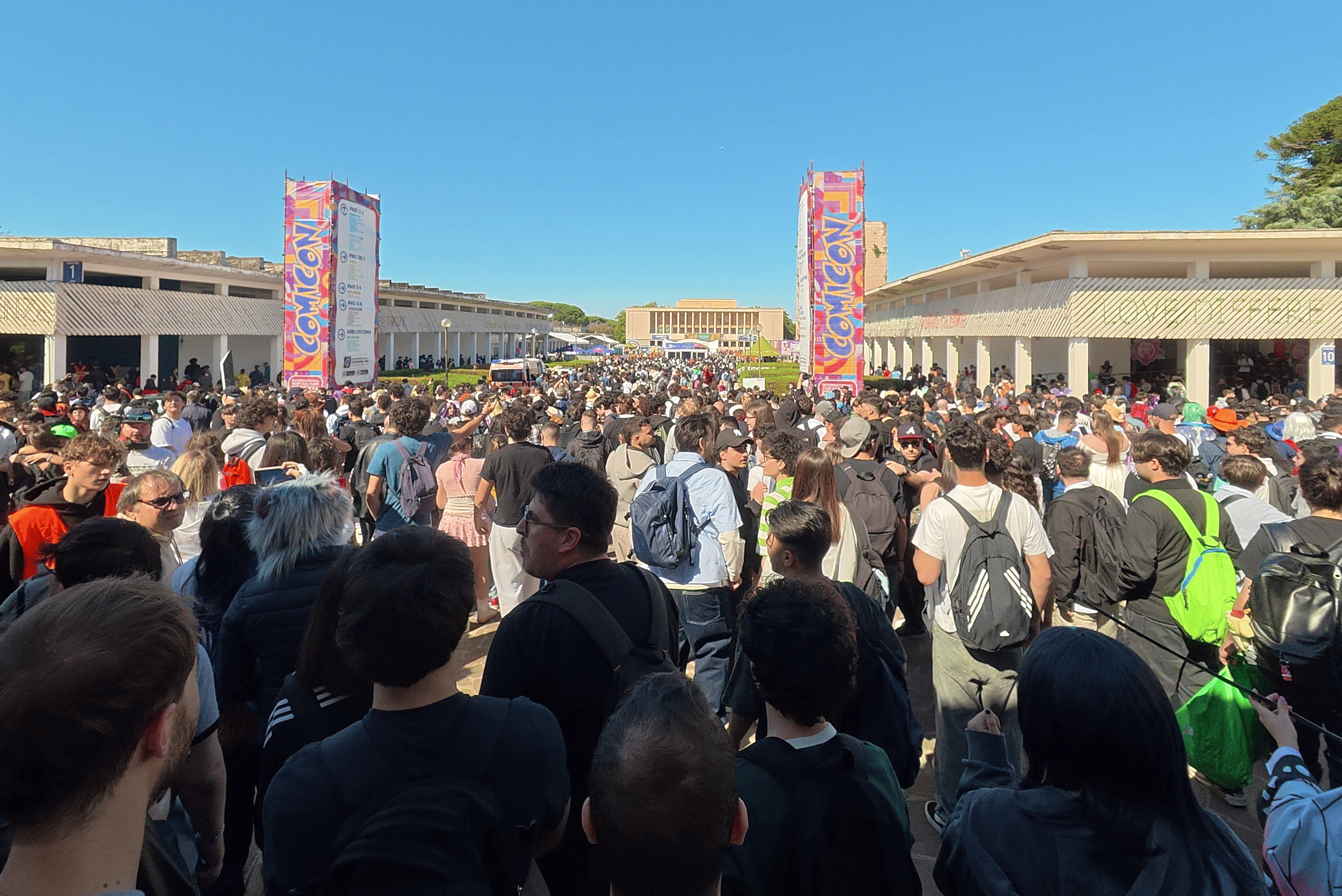
- A view of the Mostra d'Oltremare's Piazzale Tecchio entrance at 10 AM on the 2nd day of the 2026 edition of Napoli Comicon
- Status: Active
- Venue: Castel Sant'Elmo (1998–2010); Mostra d'Oltremare (2010–); Fiera di Bergamo (2023–)
- Locations: Naples (1998–); Salerno (2011–2015); Bergamo (2023–)
- Country: Italy
- Inaugurated: 1998
- Attendance: 170,000 in 2023
- Organizer: Comicon
- Website: www.comicon.it

COMICON – International Pop Culture Festival, also commonly known as Napoli Comicon, is an annual comic book convention and pop culture festival held in Naples, Italy. Established in 1998, the event takes place each spring and is one of the largest and most influential comics and pop culture festivals in Europe.

== History ==
Napoli Comicon is an international cultural festival focused on comics and multi-genre entertainment. It takes place annually in Naples, Italy, over four days (three days until 2011, except in 2008, when it was also held for four days), usually in late April or early May.

The festival is hosted at the Mostra d'Oltremare exhibition and convention center (previously held at Castel Sant'Elmo until 2009, except for the 2000 edition, which took place at Villa Pignatelli).

The first edition was held in 1998. In the 2010 and 2011 editions, the event took place across two venues: Castel Sant'Elmo and Mostra d'Oltremare.

In 2001, comics journalist and Disney expert Luca Boschi became the Cultural Director of the event, overseeing the comics program until 2016. In 2006, the same organization launched Gamecon, a gaming convention, also held in Naples.

After the success of the 2009 edition, which attracted far more visitors than expected, the event was moved to the larger and more spacious Mostra d'Oltremare convention center.

In January 2010, the organizers decided to divide Comicon into two venues for that year's edition: one focused primarily on comics and cinema/TV content, and the other on video games, tabletop games, and cosplay. The traditional festival venue, Castel Sant'Elmo, hosted publishers (except Panini and J-Pop Manga), screenings, talks, awards, the Imago contest, and comics-related exhibitions. Meanwhile, the trade show venue, Mostra d'Oltremare, featured cosplay contests, booths for game and video game publishers (including a particularly large Nintendo area with several Wii consoles available to attendees), as well as comic book stores, game stores, and distributors.

This merging of Comicon and Gamecon resulted in a single multi-genre convention covering a wide range of entertainment, including comics, cinema, TV series, video games, board games, animation, and cosplay. Since that year, the winner of the cosplay competition has also been selected to compete in an international contest. In 2010, for example, the winner qualified for the finals of the EuroCosplay Championship in London.

From 2011 to 2015, a spin-off event, Salerno Comicon, was held in Salerno, Italy. In 2012, Comicon moved the entire event to the Mostra d'Oltremare convention center. This decision was based on a survey conducted by the organizers through the festival's official Facebook page. Also introduced in the 2012 edition was the "Asian Village" area, a dedicated space within the festival focused entirely on anime, manga, and Asian culture.

In 2014, the same company launched VideoGameShow, an "innovative" convention focused on gaming, creators, and digital entertainment, co-organized with ESL Italia. The event lasted for five editions, held in both Naples and Milan, Italy.

In late 2018, comics expert and media scholar Matteo Stefanelli was appointed Comicon's first artistic director. Comicon Naples was canceled in 2020 and 2021 due to the COVID-19 pandemic. However, a smaller-scale "Comicon Extra" program, featuring both offline and online events, was held during both years. The main festival returned in 2022.

In 2023, Comicon expanded with a second edition in Bergamo, held from June 23 to 25 as part of the Bergamo–Brescia Italian Capitals of Culture 2023 initiative. The first edition of Comicon Bergamo took place in the pavilions of the Fiera di Bergamo.

== Features ==
The festival offers panels, workshops with authors and professionals, screenings, previews of upcoming feature films and TV series, meet-and-greet opportunities with creators and actors, portfolio review sessions with top comics publishers, and the COMICON/Micheluzzi Awards ceremony.

Like most comics and pop culture festivals, COMICON features a large exhibition space, both indoor and outdoor, an autograph area, and a dedicated Small Press Area for fanzines and self-published comic books.

Exhibitors at the festival include:

- Comics publishers, retailers, and distributors
- Video game publishers and retailers
- Esports organizers and teams
- Toy, RPG, and collectible merchants
- Anime and manga publishers, retailers, and distributors
- Movie and TV companies, including streaming services

Over the years, numerous artists from the comics industry, both national and international, have attended as guests, including Milo Manara, Frank Miller, Sergio Toppi, David Lloyd, Jim Lee, and Gō Nagai.

In addition to the main event, exhibitions were introduced that could be visited on the days preceding and/or following the festival. Additionally, other exhibitions and events, part of the "COMIC(ON)OFF" program, were held at various urban locations outside the main venue, such as cultural institutes, museums, stores, and galleries.

=== Themed Editions ===
Some editions of COMICON have featured one or more guest countries, with a portion of the event's program dedicated to them. This has included several exhibitions, screenings, lectures, and meetings focused on artists and works of comics and animation from those countries.

Since the 2007 edition, the central theme of the event has shifted from focusing on a specific country (and its corresponding comics school) to a color chosen from the five basic colors of letterpress printing: cyan, magenta, yellow, green, and black. Each of these colors is associated with various references and symbolism, serving as a common thread for the different initiatives presented.

Starting in 2011, COMICON inaugurated a new four-year cycle aimed at linking comics, understood as the "Ninth Art," with other forms of art, showcasing their interactions and mutual influences. Each year, one art form took the spotlight in a specific way. In 2011, the focus was on Music, while in 2012, the relationship between Comics and Literature was explored, replacing the initially planned theme of Architecture, which became the focus of the 2013 edition. In 2014, the main theme, which concluded the cycle exploring the interaction of comics with other arts, was Comics and Cinema.

=== Awards ===
A characteristic feature of the event is the Micheluzzi Award (named after Attilio Micheluzzi), which is awarded annually in various categories to the authors and publishers of contemporary comics. Since the 2005 edition, the COMICON Cosplay Challenge (also with various prizes) has taken place in the auditorium (and since 2010, on an outdoor stage at Mostra d'Oltremare) on the last day of the fair (Sunday, in the 2012 edition).

Other regular activities at the event include the Imago competition, a drawing contest with a social theme (changing each year), reserved for elementary and junior high school students. The winners of the various categories are selected by visitors through a secret ballot.

=== Editions ===
- First edition (2—4 October 1998) held at Castel Sant'Elmo.
- Second edition (5—7 May 2000) held at Villa Pignatelli.
- Third edition (15—17 June 2001) held at Castel Sant'Elmo – Guest countries: Spain and Latin America.
- Fourth edition (8—10 March 2002) held in Castel Sant'Elmo – Guest countries: Italy.
- Fifth edition (7—9 March 2003) held in Castel Sant'Elmo – Guest countries: United States of America and Canada.
- Sixth edition (5—7 March 2004) held in Castel Sant'Elmo – Guest countries: France and Belgium.
- Seventh edition (4—6 March 2005) held in Castel Sant'Elmo – Guest countries: South Korea and Japan.
- Eighth edition (3—5 March 2006) held in Castel Sant'Elmo – Guest countries: Great Britain and Germany.
- Ninth edition (27—29 April 2007) held in Castel Sant'Elmo – Colour: Cyan/Blue.
- Tenth edition (24—27 April 2008) held in Castel Sant'Elmo – Colour: Magenta/Red – Tickets sold: 27,000.
- Eleventh edition (24—26 April 2009) held in Castel Sant'Elmo – Colour: Yellow – Tickets sold: 26,000.
- Twelfth edition (30 April—2 May 2010) held at both Castel Sant'Elmo and Mostra d'Oltremare (merged with Gamecon, dedicated to games and video games) – Colour: Black – Tickets sold: 32,000.
- Thirteenth edition (29 April—1 May 2011) held both at Castel Sant'Elmo and at Mostra d'Oltremare (merged with Gamecon, dedicated to games and videogames) – Theme: Comics and Music – Tickets sold: 35,000.
- Fourteenth edition (28 April—1 May 2012) held at the Mostra d'Oltremare (merged with Gamecon, dedicated to games and videogames) – Theme: Comics and Literature – Tickets sold: 50,000.
- Fifteenth edition (25—28 April 2013) held at the Mostra d'Oltremare (merged with Gamecon, dedicated to games and video games) – Theme: Comics and Architecture – Tickets sold: 60,000.
- Sixteenth edition (1—4 May 2014) held at the Mostra d'Oltremare (merged with Gamecon, dedicated to games and videogames) – Theme: Comics and Cinema. – Tickets sold: 60,000 in the first 3 days alone.
- Seventeenth edition (30 April—3 May 2015) held at the Mostra d'Oltremare (merged with Gamecon, dedicated to games and videogames) – Theme: Comics and Media. – Tickets sold: 100,000. Visitors: 160,000.
- Eighteenth edition (22—25 April 2016) held at the Mostra d'Oltremare (merged with Gamecon, dedicated to games and videogames) – Theme: Comics and Audiovisual Image.
- Nineteenth edition (28 April—1 May 2017) held at the Mostra d'Oltremare (merged with Gamecon, dedicated to games and videogames) – Theme: Comics and the impact of the web on our cultural landscape.
- 20th edition (28 April—1 May 2018) held at the Mostra d'Oltremare (merged with Gamecon, dedicated to games and video games) – Theme: 1998–2018: twenty years of Italian comics. Tickets sold: 150,000.
- Twenty-first edition (25—28 April 2019) staged at the Mostra d'Oltremare (inside were incorporated the sections CartooNa – Cinema and TV Series, Gamecon – Games and Videogames, Asian Village, Neverland) – Theme: A new beginning. Tickets sold: 160,000.
- Twenty-second edition (22—25 April 2022): staged at the Mostra d'Oltremare. Visitors: 135,000.
- Twenty-third edition (28 April—1 May 2023): staged at the Mostra d'Oltremare.

In 2020 and 2021, the convention was not held due to the global COVID-19 pandemic. Instead, a series of events, primarily online, called 'Comicon Extra' were organized.

A second edition of Comicon will also be held from 23 to 25 June 2023, in Bergamo, which, along with Brescia, will be the Italian Capital of Culture.

== Guests ==
=== 1st–10th Edition ===
- 1st Edition (1998): Lorenzo Mattotti, Joe Sacco, Miguel Ángel Martín, Paolo Parente, Claudio Chiaverotti, Giuseppe Palumbo.
- 2nd Edition (2000): Enki Bilal, Jean Christophe Menu, David B., Igort, Jean-Louis Trintignant, Gianluigi Toccafondo, Patrizio Esposito, Franco Saudelli, Gabriella Giandelli, Leo Ortolani, Vanna Vinci, Keiko Ichiguchi.
- 3d Edition (2001): José Antonio Muñoz, Jordi Bernet, Alfonso Font, Carlos Trillo, Carlos Sampayo, Juan Padrón, Giuseppe Palumbo, Filippo Scozzari.
- 4 Edition (2002): Milo Manara, Silver, Roberto Baldazzini, Igort, Davide Toffolo, Stefano Ricci, Giuseppe Camuncoli, Matteo Casali, Luca Enoch, Giorgio Cavazzano, Silvia Ziche.
- 5ª Edition (2003): Jim Lee, Joe Quesada, Scott Morse, Don Rosa, Brian Azzarello, Seth, Gilbert Shelton, Sergio Bonelli, Gabriele Dell'Otto, Giuseppe Camuncoli, Massimo Giacon, Gianfranco Manfredi.
- 6ª Edition (2004): Alejandro Jodorowsky, Jean-Pierre Dionnet, Zoran Janjetov, Joann Sfar, David B., Yslaire, Nix, Joan De Moor, Loustal, Frank Margerin, François Boucq, Vittorio Giardino, Milo Manara.
- 7ª Edition (2005): Haruhiko Mikimoto, Hiroyuki Kitazume, Young-man Hur, Dong-hwa Kim, Shin'ichi Hiromoto, Il-sup Kim, Keiko Ichiguchi, Dae-joon Kim, Jeong-yeon Lee, Tae-joon Hyeon, Sergio Toppi, Aleksandar Zograf, Corrado Mastantuono, Gipi, Baru, Stefano Tamiazzo.
- 8ª Edition (2006): Chris Claremont, David Lloyd, Karen Berger, Jamie Delano, Gary Spencer Millidge, Ralf König, Flix, Nicolas Mahler, Kati Rickenbach, Oliver Grajewski, Kai Pfeiffer, Ulli Lust, Mawil, Diego Cajelli, Giuseppe Camuncoli, Alfredo Castelli, Marco Corona, Gianluca Costantini, José Villarrubia.
- 9ª Edition (2007): Gō Nagai, Moebius, Igort, Steve McNiven, Florence Cestac, Matt Madden, Jessica Abel, Oriol Garcia, Ivan Brun, Paolo Eleuteri Serpieri, Stefano Ricci, Anke Feucthenberger, Roberto Baldazzini, Laura Scarpa, Davide Toffolo, Alessandro Baronciani, Alberto Corradi, Adrian Tranquilli.
- 10ª Edition (2008): Dave McKean, Lorenzo Mattotti, Juan Giménez, John Cassaday, Mathieu Sapin, Terry Moore, Miguel Ángel Martín, Tetsuya Tsutsui, Thomas Von Kummant, Richard Camara, Benjamin Von Eckartsberg, Angel de la Calle, Gipi, Ivo Milazzo, Jeremyville, Daniele Caluri, Marco Nizzoli.

=== 11th–20th Edition ===
- 11ª Edition (2009): Tanino Liberatore, Leo Ortolani, Alan Davis, Bill Wilingham, Daniel Zezelj, Eduardo Risso, Roberto Recchioni, Massimo Carnevale, Gipi, Phil Ortiz, Ivo Milazzo, Paco Roca, Jeremyville, Mijn Schatje, Diavù, Angel de la Calle, Isabel Kreitz, Bastien Vivès, Clément Oubrerie, Zeina Abirached, Alfred, Catherine Meurisse, Nie Chingrui, Song Yang.
- 12ª Edition (2010): Gilbert Hernandez, Milo Manara, Carlos Trillo, Georges Wolinski, Edmond Baudoin, Baru, Andrea Bruno, Ulli Lust, Giuseppe Palumbo, Uli Oesterle, Marzena Sowa, Sylvain Savoia, Luigi Corteggi, Jim Avignon, Jon Burgerman, Bastien Vivès, Alfred, Anne Simon, Mathieu Sapin, Lee Bermejo, Tito Faraci, Riccardo Burchielli, Galvão, Goran Sudzuka, Kai Pfeiffer, Daiv Revoy, Gianluca Costantini, Maurizio Rosenzweig.
- 13ª Edition (2011): Aldo Di Gennaro, Andrea Accardi, Tiziano Angri, Akab, Ausonia, Baru, Fred Bernard, Luigi Bernardi, Émile Bravo, Jean Claude Denis, Luca Enoch, Manuele Fior, R.M. Guéra, Igort, Jul, Mauro Laurenti, Tanino Liberatore, Gianfranco Manfredi, Ivo Milazzo, Mario Natangelo, Nix, Giuseppe Palumbo, Michele Petrucci, Tuono Pettinato, Officina Infernale, Alberto Ponticelli, Roger & Raule, Rob Reger, Jean Regnaud, Filippo Scòzzari, David Rubin, Squaz, Claudio Stassi, Marteen vande Wiele, Barbara Yelin, Maurizio Nichetti (per la giuria dei Premi Micheluzzi).
- 14ª Edition (2012): Giancarlo Alessandrini, Alfred, Paolo Bacilieri, Federico Bertolucci, Enrique Breccia, Bruno Brindisi, Brrémaud, Giuseppe Camuncoli, Alfredo Castelli, Mara Cerri, Gianluca Cestaro, Raul Cestaro, Dae-Joong Kim, Frantz Duchazeau, Bruno Enna, Tito Faraci, Lucio Filippucci, David Finch, Melinda Gebbie, Sergio Gerasi, Massimo Giacon, Ale Giorgini, Paul Gravett, Line Hoven, L'antitempo, Killoffer, Luca Maresca, Miguel Ángel Martín, Alberto Corradi, John McCrea, Fabio Moon & Gabriel Bà, Mauro Laurenti, Giuseppe Palumbo, David Vecchiato aka Diavù, Frederik Peeters, Michele Petrucci, Alberto Ponticelli, Pasquale Qualano, Roberto Recchioni, Lorenzo Ruggiero, Tony Sandoval, Laura Scarpa, Paolo Eleuteri Serpieri, Tom Tirabosco, Tuono Pettinato, Paolo Cossi, Maicol & Mirco.
- 15ª Edition (2013): Eleonora Antonioni, Ausonia, Alessandro Baronciani, Barbara Canepa, Giorgio Carpinteri, Paolo Castaldi, Alfredo Castelli, Giorgio Cavazzano, Alberto Corradi, Shane Davis, Maurizio De Giovanni, David Vecchiato aka Diavù, Paco Desiato, Alessandro Di Virgilio, Luca Enoch, Tito Faraci, Luca Ferrara, Manuele Fior, Aisha Franz, Laura Fuzzi, Marco Galli, Massimo Giacon, Gud, Giuseppe Guida, Igort, Klaus, Jerry Kramsky, L'antitempo, Davide La Rosa, Tanino Liberatore, Milo Manara, Miguel Ángel Martín, Corrado Mastantuono, Lorenzo Mattotti, Anna Merli, Mino Milani, Lorenzo Palloni, Fabrizio Petrossi, Blasco Pisapia, Roberto Recchioni, Tony Sandoval, Laura Scarpa, François Schuiten, Andrea Settimo, Anne Simon, Pasquale Todisco aka Squaz, Joost Swarte, Davide Toffolo, Kiminori Wakasugi, Yoshiko Watanabe, Zerocalcare. (Simone Luciani, Enzo Russo, Salvatore Russo, Dante Maiocchi, Virginio Gigli, Flaminia Brasini, Rob Alexander, Slawomir Maniak e Svetlin Velinov ospiti di Gamecon).
- 16ª Edition (2014): Mirka Andolfo, Balak, Michaël Sanlaville, Bastien Vivès, Lorenzo Bartoli, Jutta Bauer, Giacomo Bevilacqua, Simone Bianchi, Simon Bisley, Riccardo Burchielli, Claudio Calia, Giuseppe Camuncoli, Juan Canales, Giorgio Carpinteri, Alfredo Castelli, Paolo Cattaneo, Gianluca Cestaro, Raul Cestaro, Fabio Civitelli, Alexandre Clérisse, Stephen Collins, Daw, Davide De Cubellis, Gabriele Dell'Otto, Paolo Del Vaglio, Don Alemanno, Tito Faraci, Simone Florena, Stefano Frassetto, Massimiliano Frezzato, Massimo Giacon, Gipi, Gud, Igort, Michel Kichka, L'antitempo, Davide La Rosa, Alberto Madrigal, Francesco Mattina, Dave McKean, Peter Milligan, Nuke, Alberto Ponticelli, Giorgio Pontrelli, Roberto Recchioni, Mathieu Reynès, Valérie Vernay, Graziano Romani, Luis Royo, Tony Sandoval, Mathieu Sapin, Riad Sattouf, Laura Scarpa, Silver, Stefano Simeone, Raffaele Sorrentino, Sualzo, Davide Toffolo, Tuono Pettinato, Silvia Ziche, Francesca Zoni. Rob Alexander, Nils Hamm e Paolo Mori ospiti di Gamecon. Ospiti musicali: K-ble Jungle, Mika Kobayashi, Bakusute Sotokanda Icchome, Slugger Punch.
- 17ª Edition (2015): Milo Manara (Magister), Tanino Liberatore, Davide Toffolo, Don Alemanno, Giacomo Keison Bevilacqua, Zerocalcare, Tuono Pettinato, Domingo Roberto Mandrafina, Alessandro di Virgilio, Massimiliano Frezzato, Gud, Maurizio Rosenzweig, Silvia Ziche, Sio, Angel de la Calle, Maurizio de Giovanni, Nicolò Nebo Zuliani, Keko, Emanuele Gizzi, Giovanni Masi, Squaz, Jens Harder, Kaare Andrews, Ryan Lovelock, Armin Barducci, Jacques de Loustal, Winshluss, Enrique Breccia, Goran Parlov, Francesco Francini, Matteo Scalera, Mirka Andolfo, Leo Ortolani, Kevin O' Neil, Yoshiki Tonogai, Ryuhei Tamura, Roberto dal Prà, Antonio Altaribba, Roberto Recchioni, Paolo Castaldi, Giuseppe Palumbo, Tito Faraci, Francesca Riccioni, Andrea Ferraris, Silvia Rocchi, Leomacs, Michele Petrucci, Marco Rizzo, Alfredo Castelli, Vincenzo Sparagna, Mauro Uzzeo, Mike Mckone, Rodolfo Torti, Daniele Caluri, Alessandro Rak, Nix, Lorenza Di Sepio, Nicola Saviori, Davide Barzi, Fabiano Ambu, Andrea Chiarvesio, Theo, Pierluca Zizzi, Rob Alexander, Giuseppe Camuncoli, Fabrizio Des Dorides, Stefano Antonucci, Claudio Iemmola, Scottecs, Michele Monteleone, Simone Angelini, Riccardo La Bella, Angela Vianello, Mauro Forte, Jessica Cioffi, Pierz, Davide La Rosa. Ospiti musicali: K-ble Jungle, Adams, The Asterplace, Loverin Tamburin, Airly, Slugger Punch, Dorian Gray (Sound and Vision con Ausonia), Tre Allegri Ragazzi Morti.
- 18ª Edition (2016): Silver (Magister); Claudio Acciari; Eleonora "Lola" Airaghi; Simone "Sio" Albrigi; Améziane Amazing, Sarah Andersen; Stefano Antonucci; Walter Baiamonte; Paola Barbato; Davide "Daw" Berardi; Lee Bermejo; Federico Bertolucci; Fabrizio Biggio; John Bolton; Lelio Bonaccorso; Massimo Bonfatti; Daniele "Gud" Bonomo; Riccardo Burchielli; Jacopo Camagni; Giuseppe Camuncoli; Theo Caneschi; Lorena Canottiere; Matteo Casali; Paolo Castaldi; Ilaria Catalani; Lorenzo (LRNZ) Ceccotti; Claudio Chiaverotti; Jessica "Loputyn" Cioffi; Francesco "Rathigher" D'Erminio; Roberto De Angelis; Gian Marco De Francisco; Matteo Demonte; Paco Desiato; Lorenza Di Sepio; Tito Faraci; Riccardo Federici; Tony Fejzula; Ilaria Ferramosca; Andrea Fontana; Marco Gervasio; Sergio Giardo; Marina Girardi; Claudio Gotti; Francesco Guarnaccia; Giovanni "Fubi" Guida; Erik Kriek; Adam Kubert; Alessandro "Alexander Tripood" La Monica; Grazia La Padula; Davide La Rosa; Alberto Lavoradori; Tanino Liberatore; Rocco Lombardi; Milo Manara; Niola Mari; Matteo Marino; Giuseppe Matteoni; Richard McGuire; Michele Medda; Francesca Mengozzi e Giovanni Marcora; Alice Milani; Paolo Mottura; Mario Natangelo; Marino Neri; Dario "Odde" Oddenino; Lynn Okamoto; Andrea "Tuono Pettinato" Paggiaro; Lucio Parrillo; Lorenzo Pastrovicchio; Giada Perissinotto; Laura Scarpa; Alberto Ponticelli; Giorgio Pontrelli; Francesca "Fraffrog" Presentini; Luca Raimondo; Roberto Recchioni; Marietta Ren; Davide Reviati; Giuseppe Ricciardi; Giulio Rincione; Marco Rizzo; Ciaj Rocchi; Corrado Roi; Keno Don Hugo Rosa; Maurizia Rubino; Lorenzo Ruggiero; Paolo Eleuteri Serpieri; Antonio Serra; Alessio Spataro; ND Stevenson; Silvia Tidei; Walter Venturi; Bepi Vigna; Silvia Ziche; Don Alemanno; Horne; Igort; Giorgio Carpentieri; Ruppert & Mulot; Zerocalcare.
- 19ª Edition (2017): Roberto Recchioni (Magister), Leo Ortolani(ven, sab); Akab; Miguel Angel Martin; Mirka Andolfo; Simone Angelini; Giovanni Barbieri; Alessandro Barbucci; Clara Bauer; Giacomo Bevilacqua; Lucia Biagi; Daniele Bigliardo; Alessandro Bilotta; Toni Bruno; Marco Bucci; Daniele Caluri; Jacopo Camagni; Paolo Cammello; Giuseppe Camuncoli; Matteo Casali; Paolo Castaldi; Ilaria Catalani; Gigi Cavenago; Fabio Celoni; Florence Cestac; Raul Cestaro; Gianluca Cestaro; Marco Cecchetto; Nicolas De Crécy; Maurizio De Giovanni; Lorenza Di Sepio; Don Alemanno; Bruno Enna; Tito Faraci; Giuseppe Ferrandino; Fraffrog; Andrea Freccero; Otto Gabos; Raphael Geffray; Gipi; Nicola Gobbi; Katharina Greve; Jay; Scott Koblish; Grazia La Padula; Davide La Rosa; Mattia Labadessa; Tanino Liberatore; David Lopez; Lorenzo "LRNZ" Ceccotti; Max; Menotti; Alice Milani; Dario Moccia; Michele Monteleone; Michele Monteleone; Paolo Mottura; Marino Neri; Alessandro Nespolino; Leo Ortolani; Emiliano Pagani; Gianluca Pagliarani; Lorenzo Palloni; Giuseppe Palumbo; Daniel Pennac; Boban Pesov; Fabrizio Petrossi; Blasco Pisapia; Giorgio Pontrelli; Rathiger; Davide Reviati; Hans Rickheit; Giulio e Marco Rincione; Marco Rizzo; Silvia Rocchi; Alonso Rojas; Grzegorz Rosinski; Federico Rossi Edrighi; Filippo Scòzzari; Stefano Simeone; Emanuel Simeoni; Luigi Siniscalchi; Sio; Alice Socal; Sara Spano; Sualzo; Marco Taddei; Teo Demonte; Ciaj Rocchi; Teresa Radice; Stefano Turconi; Silvia Tidei; Riccardo Torti; Toyotaro; Tuono Pettinato; Mauro Uzzeo; Alessandro Vitti; Nicoletta Zanchi; Zerocalcare.
- 20ª Edition (2018): Gino La Monica, Frank Miller, Brian Azzarello, Lorenzo Mattotti, Paul Azaceta, Carmine Di Giandomenico, Giorgio Cavazzano, Milo Manara, FEMM, Slugger Punch, Takahiro Sakai alias "Goldy", Maurizio De Giovanni, Tanino Liberatore, Claudio Castellini, Kim Jung GI, Silvio Orlando, Nanowar of Steel, Jul Maroh, Paolo Bacilieri, Enrique Breccia, Anna Trieste, Michael Rocchetti alias "Maicol&Mirco", Ausonia, Frank Matano, Frank Santoro, Werter dell’Edera, Lorenzo Pastrovicchio, Tommaso Di Spigna alias "Spugna", Lucy Lawless, Mike Allred, Giuseppe Camuncoli, Alberto Ponticelli, Miguel Ángel Martín, Leo Ortolani, Laura Allred, Sarah Andersen, Michele Poggi alias "Sabaku no Maiku", Marco D'Amore, Manlio Castagna, Maurizio Rosenzweig, Francesco Guarnaccia, Jacopo Paliaga, Mattia Surroz, French Carlomagno, Giorgio Pontrelli, Alessandro Mereu, Pasquale Qualano, Vincenzo Maisto alias "Il Signor Distruggere", Giorgio Carpinteri, Blasco Pisapia, Giada Perissinotto, Giada Perissinotto, Fabio Bortolotti alias Kenobit, Giulio Rincione, Francesco Francavilla, Camilla D’Onofrio, Licia Troisi, Jacopo Camagni, Nico Picone, Igort, Alfredo Castelli, Tommaso Vitiello, Marco Itri, Mattia Labadessa, Daniel Cuello, Juien Cittadino alias Capitan Artiglio, Daniele Fabbri, Zapping, Paolo Castaldi, Zerocalcare, Luca Zampriolo, Ratigher, Roberto Recchioni, Simone Angelini, Alessandro Martorelli alias Martoz, Sio, Andrea Delogu, Ema Stokholma, Adam Brockbank, Birgit Weyhe, Marco Galli, PlayerInside, Jerry Kramsky, Francesco Cattani, Mirka Andolfo, Ancco, Matilda De Angelis, Giulia Blasi, Blutch, Juan Díaz Canales, Haru, Esad Ribić, Clara Serina, Vittorio Giardino, Akab, Slugger Punch, Emiliano Pagani, Bruno Cannucciari, Tito Faraci, Claudio Chiaverotti, Paolo Barbieri, Alvin Star, Nob, RaggiGamma, Walter Obert, Jason Shiga, Laura Scarpa, Giuseppe Palumbo, Bertrand Gatignol, Eldo Yoshimizu, Lelio Bonaccorso, Marco Rizzo, Riccardo Nunziati, Eleonora Aureliana Guglielmi alias "Yuriko Tiger", Walter Nuccio, Okayado, Tuono Pettinato, Dario Moccia, Giacomo Bevilacqua, Il Velivolo Ghibli, Giorgia Vecchini alias "Giorgia Cosplay".

=== 21st– ===
- 21ª Edition (2019): Puff Purple, Giorgio Vanni, Immanuel Casto (2 show, uno con Valentina Nappi, uno solista), Nanowar of Steel, Hoshi, Stefano Bersola & Guiomar Serina (con Pietro Ubaldi), Jerome Flynn, Tom Cullen, Tuono Pettinato, Zerocalcare, Cristiana Dell'Anna, Sio, Maurizio De Giovanni, Sabaku No Maiku, Fumettibrutti, Colapesce, Manetti Bros. Igort, Giancarlo Soldi, Maicol & Mirko, Lorenzo "LRNZ" Ceccotti, Nicola De Gobbis, Dr. Pira, Dave McKean, Fraffrog, Giulio Rincione, Paolo Castaldi, Spugna, Violetta Rocks, Tito Faraci, Ratigher, ZUZU.; Loverin Tamburin.
- 22ª Edition (2022): Kazunori Yamauchi, Frank Cho, Zerocalcare, Sio, Tanino Liberatore, Valerio Lundini, Yolanda Lynes, Krista Kosonen, Gianluca Fru, Salvatore Esposito, Davide Toffolo, Greta Scarano, Gianfranco Gallo, Fortunato Cerlino, Dario Bressanini, Pow3r, Johnny Ryan, Florent Ruppert, Jérôme Mulot, Giuseppe Camuncoli, Leo Ortolani, Pera Toons, Mirka Andolfo, Giuseppe Palumbo, Igort, Alessandro Bilotta, Tito Faraci, Nicolas Maupas, Matteo Paolillo, Giacomo Giorgio, Serena De Ferrari, Giovanna Sannino, Valentina Romani, Maria Esposito, Andrea Delogu, Michele Alhaique, Adriano Giannini, Maurizio De Giovanni, Licia Troisi, Sick Luke, Riae, Leon Chiro, Chris Darril, Sabaku no Maiku, Dario Moccia, Iolanda Sweets, Claudio Di Biagio, Paolocannone, Nello Nigro, Kurolily, InnTale, Nello Taver, Arex & Vastatore, Immanuel Casto, Spartaco Albertarelli, Dario Sansone, Fabio Celoni, Manlio Castagna, Fumettibrutti, Davide "Dado" Caporali, Carolina Tedeschi, Emiliano Mammucari, Matteo Corradini, Matteo Casali, Bryan Talbot, Mary Talbot, Enrique Breccia Roberto Recchioni, Sara Colaone, Fabrizio Mazzotta, Nicola De Gobbis, Andrea Rossi, Sualzo, Quasirosso, Lorenza Di Sepio, Lelio Bonaccorso, Giorgio Catania, Violetta Rovetto "Rocks", Don Alemanno, Sinister, Axel Fox, ImViolet, Ckibe, Elizabeth Rage, Taryn, Melancholia, Davide Minnella, Alessio Della Valle, Dora Romano, Arianna Becheroni, Roberto Zazzara, Lorenzo Richelmy, Jiizuke, Sekuar, Sbriser, Grax, Emiliano "MoonBoy" Marini, Filippo Burresi, Sabino Palermo, Davide "Spazi Attorcigliati" De Biasio, Fabio Guaglione, Daniele Misischia, Alessandro Redaelli, Thru Collected, Kenobit, Mandark, Voodoo Kid.
- 23ª Edition (2023): Giorgio Cavazzano, Miki Yoshikawa, Valerio Mastandrea, Caparezza, Sio, Zerocalcare, Pu Liu, Cristina D'Avena, Aki Irie, Iginio Straffi, Jim Lee (da remoto), Daniel Warren Johnson, Milo Manara, Tanino Liberatore, Gipi, Mirka Andolfo, Pau, Mika Kobayashi, Igort, Brian Azzarello, Simone Bianchi, Tetsuro Shimaguchi, Victor Perez, Federico Zampaglione, Cartoni Morti, Antonio d'Aquino, Giovanna Sannino, The Jackal, John Romero (da remoto), Cydonia, Sabaku No Maiku, Pow3r, Kurolily, Manuele Fior, Maurizio De Giovanni, Tony Tammaro, Giuseppe Camuncoli, Giacomo Bevilacqua, Fraffrog, Dado, David Matchavariani, Brecht Vandenbroucke, Marcello Quintanilha, Tony Sandoval, Barbara Canepa, Sethu, Tony Valente, ZUZU, Paolo Bacilieri, Tito Faraci, Fumettibrutti, Linton Johnson, Antonella "Himorta" Arpa, Stefano "St3pny" Lepri, Filippo Scòzzari, Slim Dogs, Lavlien & Wolfot, Dario Moccia, Federic95, Nicola De Gobbis, Lello Arena, Francesco Artibani, Matteo Casali, Wallie, InnTale, Denis Agostinelli, Roby, Eleonora Olivieri, X1ao, Martex, Roberto Recchioni, Adrian Fartade, Elena Coriale, Kenobit, Cristina Nava, David Fox (da remoto), Yuji Koi, Lucariello, Ciccio Merolla
