= Fumettologica =

Pop culture website

- Screenshot of Fumettologica homepage in August 2018
- Website type: Comic books, pop culture
- Available in: Italian
- Headquarters: Milan, Italy
- Creator: Matteo Stefanelli
- Website: fumettologica.it
- Launched: October 22, 2013; 13 years ago
- Current status: Online

Fumettologica is a news website covering comic book–related news and discussion, considered the most important Italian information source on the topic.

== History ==
The site was founded in 2013 - debuting online on October 22 - by Matteo Stefanelli, essayist and professor at the Università Cattolica del Sacro Cuore, together with Lucio Staiano, owner of Shockdom. Stefanelli is also publisher of the site.

Fumettologica was born as the ideal continuation of two blogs specializing in comics that were among the most successful in previous years, Fumettologicamente by Stefanelli and Conversazioni sul fumetto by Andrea Queirolo (who became editor-in-chief of the site), expanding the field of action to animation and the various creative areas close to comics (cinema, television, literature, video games, music, art, design). At first, Queirolo was working along with Niccolò de Mojana, a journalist and web editor who had worked for Disney and Rolling Stones.

Defined as «the most important Italian site dedicated to comics», cited by various Italian and international media, such as Washington Post, Le Figaro, Courrier International, il Post, Cartoon Brew and /Film, among the reference publications on comics in Italy, the site presents its own journalistic content and translations of articles by some of the most prestigious authors of national and international comics criticism international - from Paul Gravett to Joe McCulloch, or from publications such as The Comics Journal, ActuaBD, Cases d'Histoire. Over the years it has also published unpublished comics by important Italian authors: Davide Toffolo, Paolo Bacilieri, and the column Tippy Tuesday by Tuono Pettinato.

The site is also media partners of the main Italian comics and literary festivals: Lucca Comics & Games, starting from 2017, BilBOlbul from 2014 onwards, Napoli Comicon in 2015, with the specific role in selecting candidates for the "Best Webcomic" category of the Attilio Micheluzzi Award, Turin International Book Fair starting from 2023; it has also developed partnerships with the magazines Illustratore Italiano (2017 and 2018) and L'Indice dei libri del mese (2016).
