= Blue (Italian magazine) =

Italian erotic auteur comics magazine

- Cover of the first issue, January 1991.
- Categories: Comic magazine
- Frequency: Bi-monthly
- Publisher: Coniglio Editore
- Founded: 1991
- Final issue: 2009
- Country: Italy
- Based in: Rome
- Language: Italian

Blue was an Italian erotic auteur comics magazine, published from 1991 to 2009 in Rome, Italy.

== History and profile ==
The magazine debuted in January 1991, and was published monthly and later bi-monthly. It was intended according to the founder and publisher Francesco Coniglio as "a Noah's Ark, a rescue ship of creativity for many cartoonists, illustrators and photographers". During its first five years of history, it had a circulation of 20,000 copies per issue.

It published series and short stories by Milo Manara, Roberto Baldazzini, Riccardo Mannelli, Guido Crepax, Filippo Scòzzari, Vittorio Giardino, Franco Saudelli, Massimo Mattioli, Massimo Rotundo, Leone Frollo, Menotti, Gipi, Paolo Bacilieri, Giovanna Casotto, Carlo Ravaioli, Silvio Cadelo, Michelangelo La Neve, among others. It also presented works by prominent international artists such as Robert Crumb, Jean Giraud, Matthias Schultheiss, Georges Wolinski, Horacio Altuna, Jacques Tardi, Eric Stanton, Ralf König, Juan Giménez, Michael Kaluta, Régis Loisel, Carlos Trillo, Lydia Lunch, Jean-Pierre Gibrat.

The magazine closed in December 2009, with its #200 issue. The publisher launched in its place a short-lived new magazine, Touch, subtitled "il sex appeal dell’immaginario" ("the sex appeal of imagination").

== See also ==
- List of magazines in Italy
