= Super Cane Magic Zero =

Super Cane Magic ZERO - Legend of the Cane Cane
- Developer: Studio Evil
- Publisher: Intragames
- Artist: Sio
- Writer: Sio
- Composers: Sio, Bulby
- Engine: Unity
- Platforms: Microsoft Windows, Playstation 4, Nintendo Switch, macOS, Linux
- Release: Windows, macOS, Linux: August 26, 2015 - Nintendo Switch, Playstation 4: May 30th, 2019
- Genre: Action RPG
- Modes: Single-player, Multiplayer

Reception

Review score
Publication	Score
IGN	7.5

Super Cane Magic ZERO - Legend of the Cane Cane, or simply known as Super Cane Magic ZERO, is an action role-playing game developed by Studio Evil, born from an idea of the comic writer and cartoonist Sio.

== Plot ==
The world of WOTF is plunged in confusion because of the dog AAAH! eating the magic candy cane of the Cake Wizard, his now dead owner. Four heroes fallen from the sky have to save the world from AAAH!'s magic guided by a sentient cake, but first, they have to find all 6 mages and witches of the Poptart's Academy.

== Reception ==
The game got selectioned at the PAX South 2018 and was between the finalist in the IndieCade Europe 2018.

== Characters ==
Every playable character in the game has personal abilities and skills. Coso, Cosa, Giancoso, Annacosa, Sofocchia, Missy Talia, Doctor Culocane, Mariangiongiangela, Evilino, Nonno Laser, Flascio, Yogurt, Pesceman, Cook, Dr. Osse, Bana, Doctor Malvagius and Ninja Koji are all made by Sio, which is a playable character too. Daw, another artist who is a friend of Sio in real life, makes an appearance as a playable character.
