= Pettinato =

Pettinato is a surname. Notable people with the surname include:

- Giovanni Pettinato (1934–2011), Italian paleographer
- Roberto Pettinato (born 1955), Argentine musician and journalist
- Tuono Pettinato (1976–2021), Italian comics writer and illustrator
