= Campos (band) =

Italian electronic-folk rock band

- Origin: Pisa, Italy
- Genres: Experimental rock; folktronica; indietronica; indie rock
- Years active: 2011–present
- Labels: Aloch Dischi (2016–2017); Woodworm (2017–present)
- Members: Simone Bettin; Davide Barbafiera; Tommaso Tanzini
- Past members: Dhari Vij

Campos is an Italian electronic-folk rock band from Pisa, formed in 2011.

== History ==
The band was founded in Pisa in 2011 by Simone Bettin, former guitarist of Motta's Criminal Jokers, and music producer Davide Barbafiera. Later that year, Bettin moved to Berlin, where he met Australian bassist Dhari Vij, who joined the band in 2014. The trio started to perform their first songs in the clubs of Berlin and recorded their debut English-language studio album, Viva, in 2015. The album was mastered by disc jockey Jan Driver, and released on 3 March 2017 by label Aloch Dischi.

Later in 2017, Dhari Vij was replaced by Tommaso Tanzini and the band signed with Woodworm.

In 2018, Davide Barbafiera co-starred in the film The Happiest Man in the World by Gipi, presented at the 75th Venice International Film Festival, and the band itself appeared in a cameo role; some of the tracks from Viva were also included in the film's soundtrack.

They released their first Italian-language studio album, Umani, vento e piante (lit. 'Humans, wind and plants'), on 9 November 2018.

On 27 November 2020, Campos released their third studio album, Latlong.

== Members ==
- Simone Bettin (b. 1987) – lead vocals and guitar
- Davide Barbafiera (b. 1985) – keyboards, samples and effects
- Tommaso Tanzini (b. 1986) – bass (since 2017)

=== Past members ===
- Dhari Vij – bass (2014–2017)

== Discography ==
=== Studio albums ===
- Viva (2017)
- Umani, vento e piante (2018)
- Latlong (2020)

=== Singles ===
- "Qualcosa cambierà" (2018)
- "Sonno" (2020)
