= Giovanna Casotto =

Italian comics artist

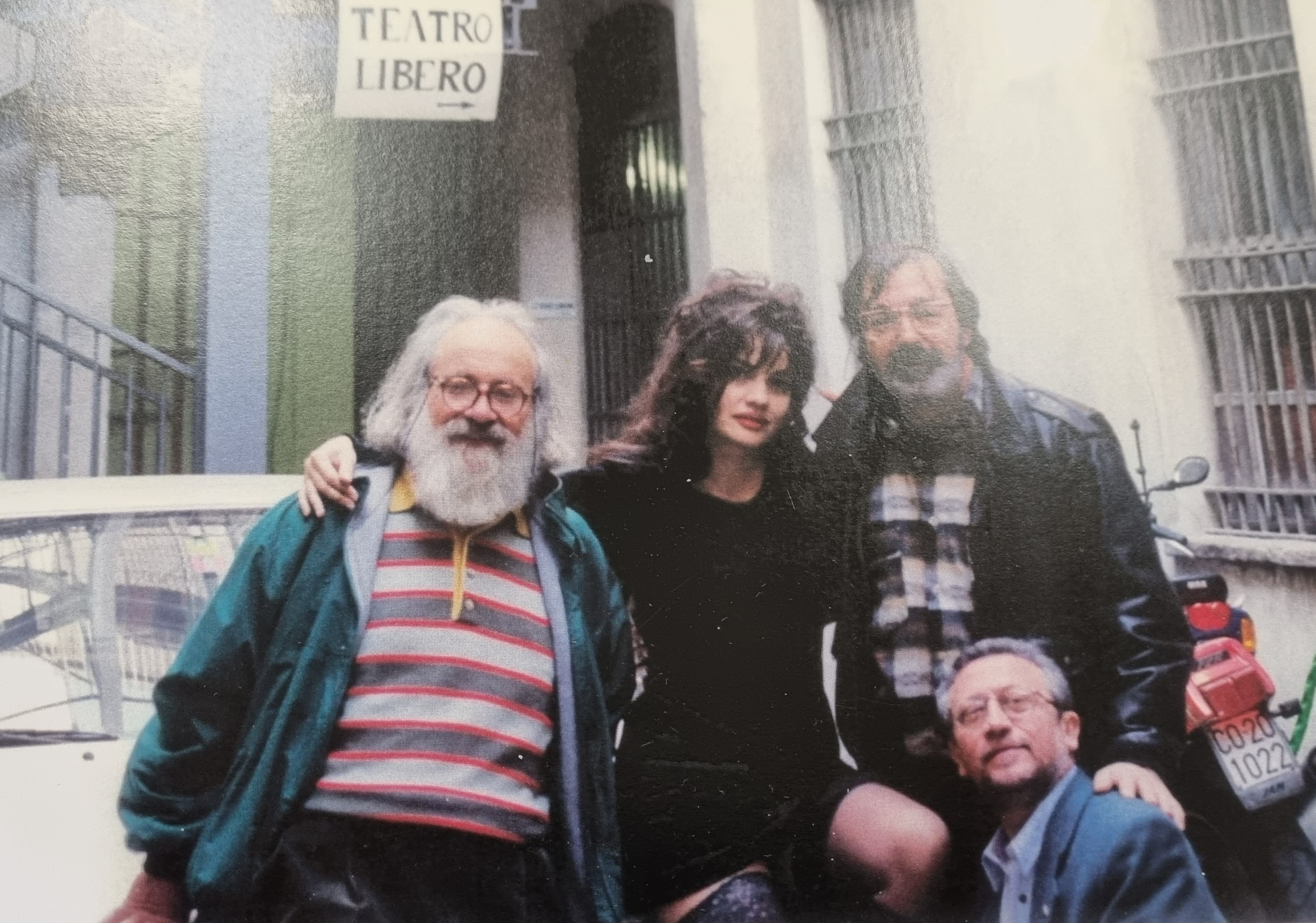
- Casotto (center), with members of Studio Zeta, c.1990
- Born: August 2, 1962 (age 64); Desio, Lombardy, Italy
- Occupation: Comics artist

Giovanna Casotto (born 2 August 1962) is an Italian comic book artist and illustrator, known for her erotic comics.

== Life and career ==
Casotto was born in Desio, in Lombardy. She was passionate about drawing and comics since childhood; before entering this career she lived as a housewife. She attended the School of Comics in Milan for three years, after which she published some short stories for Intrepido magazine, written by Mauro Muroni. In 1994 she met Franco Saudelli, with whom she became a frequent collaborator.

In 1991, the publisher Stefano Trentini proposed her to draw stories about football, but she refused, not feeling attracted to the genre. Trentini himself, three years later, involved her in the project of the erotic culture and comics magazine Selen. When the magazine closed, she moved on to the similar monthly publication Blue, published by Coniglio Editore and began to publish erotic tables for the English magazine Desire. Casotto's stories were first published in the U.S. in 1994, in the series Bitch in Heat by the Fantagraphics imprint Eros Comix.

Casotto's erotic stories are inspired by a 1950's pin-up aesthetic. She often poses herself as a photographic reference for the comics.
