= Nadia Terranova =

Italian writer

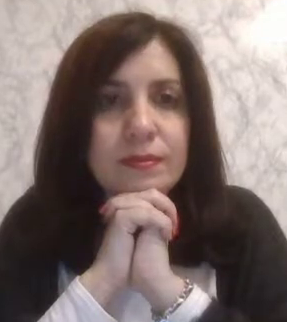
- Born: 1 January 1978 (age 47); Messina, Italy
- Occupation: Writer

Nadia Terranova (born 1 January 1978) is an Italian author.

== Life and career ==
Born in Messina, Terranova graduated in philosophy at the University of Messina, and then got a doctorate in modern history at the University of Catania. In 2003 she moved to Rome, where she started her activity as a writer as the author of children’s books. Her debut novel Gli anni al contrario ("The years in reverse", 2015) got her critical appraise and several awards including the Bagutta Prize for best first work and the Premio Brancati. The book was selected by La Repubblica as one of the best Italian books of the 2010s decade.

Terranova's second novel Farewell, Ghosts (Italian: Addio fantasmi, 2018) was a finalist at the 2019 Strega Prize, losing to Antonio Scurati's M. Son of the Century. It also won several awards, including the Martoglio Prize and Alassio Centolibri Prize, and Corriere della Sera ranked it sixth on their 2018 best books list.

Terranova is also a contributor to several magazines and newspapers, an essayist, an author of short stories and a radio writer. In 2021 she made up her first graphic novel, Caravaggio e la ragazza, illustrated by Lelio Bonaccorso. The same year she was a jury member of the "Horizons" section at the 78th Venice International Film Festival.

== Works ==
Novels

- Gli anni al contrario, Torino, Einaudi, 2015 ISBN 978-88-06-21731-0.
- Addio fantasmi, Torino, Einaudi, 2018 ISBN 978-88-06-23745-5 (trans. Farewell, Ghosts, Ann Goldstein, Seven Stories Press, 2022).
- Trema la notte, Torino, Einaudi, 2022 ISBN 978-88-06-24890-1 (trans. The Night Trembles, Ann Goldstein, Seven Stories Press, 2025).
- Quello che so di te, Milano, Guanda, 2025.

Collections of Short-Stories

- Come una storia d’amore, Roma, Perrone, 2020 ISBN 978-88-6004-523-2.

Children and Young Adults Fiction

- Caro diario ti scrivo... con Patrizia Rinaldi, Casale Monferrato, Sonda, 2011 ISBN 978-88-7106-617-2.
- Bruno. Il bambino che imparò a volare, Roma, Orecchio acerbo, 2012 ISBN 978-88-96806-23-4.
- Storia d'agosto, di Agata e d'inchiostro, Casale Monferrato, Sonda, 2012 ISBN 978-88-7106-655-4.
- Le Mille e una Notte raccontate da Nadia Terranova, Roma, La Nuova Frontiera junior, 2013 ISBN 978-88-904773-4-8.
- Le nuvole per terra, San Dorligo della Valle, Einaudi Ragazzi, 2015 ISBN 978-88-6656-262-7.
- Casca il mondo, Milano, Mondadori, 2016 ISBN 978-88-04-66309-6.
- Omero è stato qui, Milano, Bompiani, 2019 illustrazioni di Vanna Vinci ISBN 978-88-452-9691-8.
- Aladino e la lampada magica, Roma, Orecchio Acerbo, 2020, illustrazioni di Lorenzo Mattotti.
- Non sono mai stata via. Vita in esilio di María Zambrano, Palermo, RueBallu, 2020, illustrazioni di Pia Valentinis.
- Il segreto, Milano, Mondadori, 2021, ISBN 9788804737605, illustrazioni di Mara Cerri.
- Il cortile delle sette fate, Milano, Guanda, 2022, ISBN 9788823531277

Non-Fiction

- Un’idea di infanzia. Libri, bambini e altra letteratura, Trieste-Roma, Italo Svevo Editore, 2019 ISBN 978-88-99028-39-8.
