= Fumettibrutti =

Italian cartoonist (born 1991)

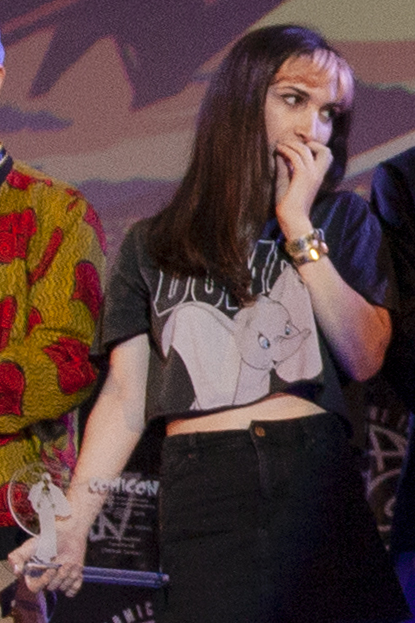
- Fumettibrutti at the 2019 Napoli Comicon
- Born: 10 December 1991 (age 34); Catania, Italy
- Occupation: Cartoonist

Josephine Yole Signorelli (born 10 December 1991), known professionally as Fumettibrutti, is an Italian cartoonist and activist.

== Biography ==
Josephine Yole Signorelli is a transgender woman. After graduating with a degree in graphic design at the State Art Institute of Catania in 2010, she continued her studies in the painting course at the Academy of Fine Arts, also in her hometown, obtaining her degree in 2013. She then moved to Bologna to attend the specialization course in "Linguaggi del Fumetto" at the Academy of Bologna, where she completed it in 2019.

Fumettibrutti quickly became an internet celebrity after opening her art project on social networks, and was contacted by Feltrinelli in Milan to debut with an author publication in the new editorial series 'Feltrinelli Comics', inaugurated in 2018, winning the Micheluzzi Award for Best First Work at Napoli Comicon, the Cecchetto Award for Best Emerging Talent at the Treviso Comic Festival, and the Grand Guinigi for Best Newcomer at Lucca Comics & Games.

== Works ==
- Romanzo esplicito. Milan: Feltrinelli Comics. 2018. ISBN 9788807550072.
- P. La mia adolescenza trans. Milan: Feltrinelli Comics. 2019. ISBN 9788807550348.
- Anestesia. Milan: Feltrinelli Comics. 2020. ISBN 9788807550607.

Anthologies

- Fumettibrutti (2018). "Lola Space, Bang and Kiss". In Marco Galli (ed.). Materia Degenere. Turin: Diabolo Edizioni. ISBN 9788894203769.
- Fumettibrutti (2019). "Ave". In Elisabetta Sedda (ed.). Post Pink. Antologia di fumetto femminista. Milan: Feltrinelli Comics. ISBN 9788807550218.
- Fumettibrutti, ed. (2020). Sporchi e Subito. Milan: Feltrinelli Comics. ISBN 9788807550508.
