= Giorgio Vanni =

Italian singer (born 1963)

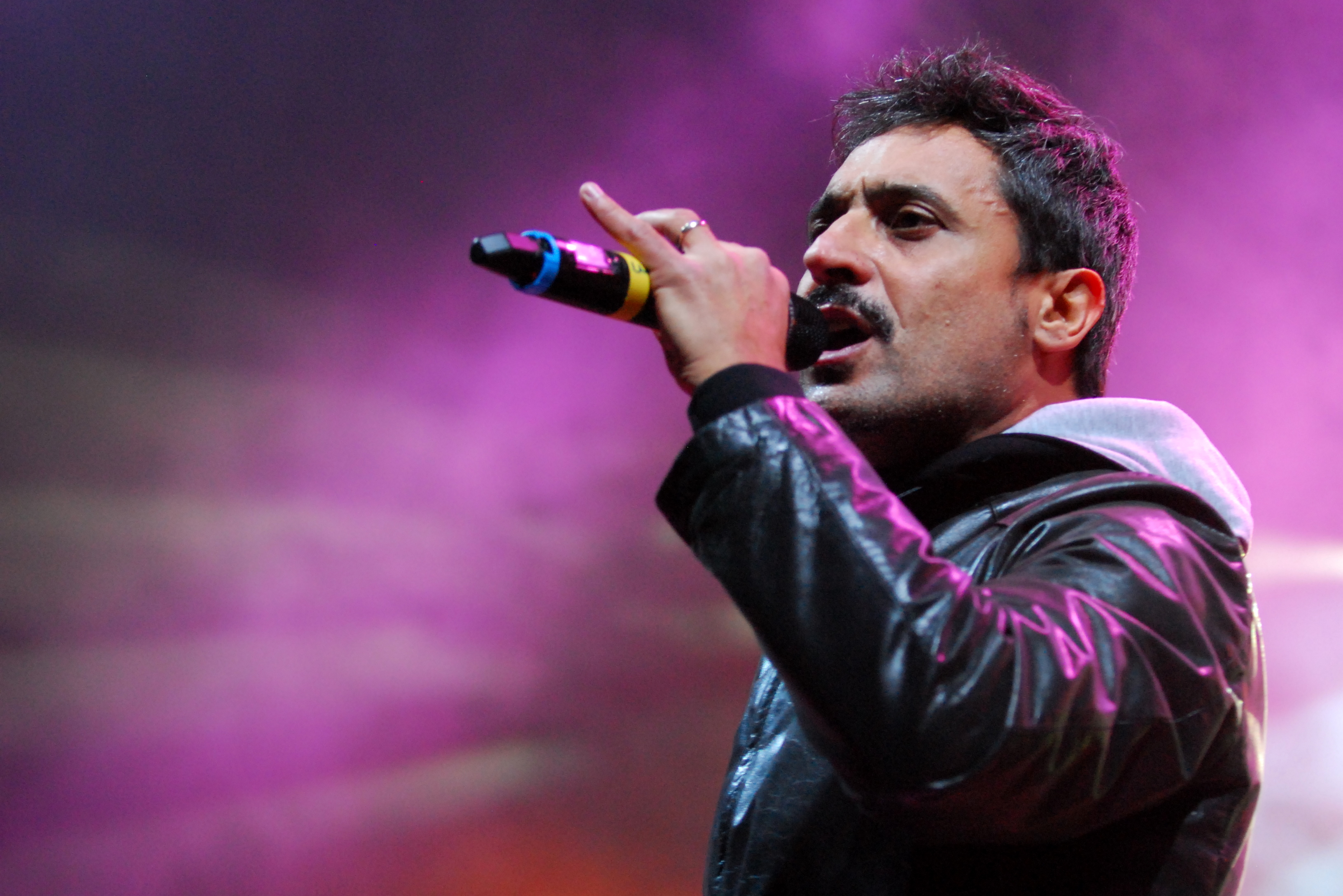

Background information
- Born: 19 August 1963; Milan, Italy
- Origin: Milan, Italy
- Genres: Theme music; pop; rock; Italo dance
- Occupations: Singer; songwriter
- Instruments: Vocals; guitar
- Years active: 1979–present
- Labels: RTI Music; Lova Music
- Website: www.lovamusic.com

Giorgio Vanni (born 19 August 1963) is an Italian songwriter and guitarist.

== Biography ==
=== 1963–1995: Early career, Tomato, and Grande Cuore ===
Giorgio Vanni was born in Milan and grew up in San Giuliano Milanese. He discovered music at an early age through his parents, who were avid music lovers. In 1976, at the age of 13, he formed his first band, Luti's Band. Two years later, he was introduced to reggae music through Bob Marley's album Babylon by Bus.

In 1980, Vanni formed his first professional pop-rock group, Tomato, with Paolo Costa and Claudio D'Onofrio. Two years later, they were discovered by Italian producer Roberto Colombo.

In 1983, Tomato released The Island of the Sun, with Vanni singing under the pseudonym Iudy. In 1984, the band collaborated with Miguel Bosé on his album Bandido, as well as with Den Harrow, Taffy, and Ivan. Vanni released his first single, Tam Tam, later that year, featuring Mike Ogletree, the former drummer of Simple Minds.

In 1987, Vanni composed the music for the song Lay Down on Me from Miguel Bosé's album XXX. The band struggled for four more years to find a record label willing to give them an opportunity. In 1991, after collaborating with numerous artists such as Mango, Eugenio Finardi, Cristiano De André, Roberto Vecchioni, Pierangelo Bertoli, and Tazenda, Tomato released their self-titled debut album, produced by Mauro Paoluzzi and Angelo Carrara.

In 1992, Vanni and the band competed in the "Newcomers" category at the Sanremo Music Festival, Italy's most prestigious music competition, with the song Sai cosa sento per te. Although they did not reach the finals, the festival marked a turning point, and the band disbanded shortly after.

In 1994, Vanni released his first solo album, Grande Cuore.

=== 1996–1998: Collaboration with Max Longhi and Alessandra Valeri Manera ===
Vanni met musician Max Longhi in 1996, and the two began collaborating on television music programs (such as Generazione X on Italia 1) and commercial jingles. They arranged music for advertising campaigns for major brands including Coca-Cola (singing the "Always Coca-Cola" jingle), Dietorelle, Q8, and Brooklyn.

In 1998, Vanni and Longhi wrote Buone verità for Laura Pausini's album La mia risposta. The song was also recorded in Spanish as Una gran verdad.

That same year, the duo met Alessandra Valeri Manera, the head of children's programming at Mediaset. Impressed by their musical style, she invited them to compose opening themes for animated television series. Vanni provided the vocals for these tracks. Their first composition, Superman, was included on Cristina D'Avena's album Fivelandia 16.

=== 1999–2008: Pokémon, Dragon Ball, and television success ===
In 1999, Vanni and Longhi wrote the Italian opening themes for Pokémon and Dragon Ball. As the anime franchises became national phenomena in Italy, their respective theme songs became two of the most iconic tracks in Vanni's repertoire.

Vanni also began a long-standing collaboration with singer Cristina D'Avena, the most prominent vocalist for Italian cartoon themes. He and Longhi wrote Imbarchiamoci per un grande viaggio for her, marking the first of many songs they would produce together. That same year, they also composed the themes for Hello Sandybell, Mille emozioni tra le pagine del destino per Marie Yvonne, and Una giungla di avventure per Kimba.

In 2000, Mediaset acquired the rights to the second seasons of Pokémon and Dragon Ball. Vanni and Longhi produced two new themes: Pokémon: Oltre i cieli dell'avventura and What's my destiny Dragon Ball. The latter became even more popular than its predecessor. That year, Vanni also performed his first duet with D'Avena on Rossana, the Italian opening for Kodomo no omocha. The song was composed by Franco Fasano, arranged by Max Longhi, with lyrics by Alessandra Valeri Manera.

Capitalizing on the popularity of dance music, RTI Music produced several remix albums, the most famous being the Cartuno series. Vanni and Longhi released four albums under this brand.

In 2002, the duo founded their own record label, LoVa Music.

In 2003, they composed Super Lover - I need you tonight for the Japanese boy band W-inds. The song was a major success in Japan, achieving platinum certification.

Between 2001 and 2003, Vanni and Longhi wrote numerous themes for cartoons and anime, including All'arrembaggio! (One Piece), Hamtaro piccoli criceti, grandi avventure, Ma che magie Doremì, and Doraemon, all sung by Cristina D'Avena. Vanni also performed the vocals for several opening themes, such as Yu-Gi-Oh!, Detective Conan, L'incredibile Hulk, and Maledetti scarafaggi.

From 2004 to 2008, Vanni wrote and released over fifty opening themes. He performed songs for series like He-Man and the Masters of the Universe, Zoids, Keroro, and Io credo in me (Beyblade), while D'Avena sang themes for Mirmo and Hamtaro. The two also performed duets for the themes of Gadget e i Gadgettini, Pokémon Advanced, and Zip e Zap.

=== 2009–2013: Live performances and compilation albums ===
Beginning in 2009, Vanni started performing live at comic book conventions across Italy, with his first appearance at Lucca Comics & Games. Although he had initially believed his music was strictly for a child audience and had not envisioned performing live, he acknowledged the continued popularity of his songs. During this period, he and Longhi wrote Blue Dragon (a duet with D'Avena) and Yu-Gi-Oh Duel Runner. He also recorded a second version of the Io credo in me theme.

In late 2010, Vanni released the album Giorgio Vanni Project - I cartoni di Italia1, compiling his work for American animated series. This followed the release of all his songs on Cristina D'Avena's albums.

In 2011, he wrote "Beyblade Metal", released during a hiatus in Mediaset's acquisition of new anime and cartoon properties, which lasted until 2015.

During this break, Vanni and Longhi focused on producing a new album. On 4 July 2012, they released Time Machine - Da Goldrake a Goku, a cover album paying homage to past artists and songs, such as Massimo Dorati, Enzo Draghi, and Cristina D'Avena. The tracklist spanned from the 1980s to the 2000s, concluding with a mash-up of What's My Destiny Dragon Ball and the Pet Shop Boys' version of Go West.

=== 2014–2015: Super Hits and return to anime themes ===
On 27 May 2014, Vanni released Super Hits - Il meglio del meglio del meglio, a collection comprising his solo works from 1998 to 2014, along with new tracks such as Hover Champs! and Conan, il detective più famoso.

In 2015, after a four-year hiatus, Vanni returned to RTI to write the Italian opening for Lupin III - L'avventura italiana, titled Lupin, un ladro in vacanza. The song, a duet with Italian rapper Moreno, sparked significant controversy on social media, leading to petitions demanding the theme be changed.

In November 2015, three of Vanni's compositions for Cristina D'Avena (Principesse gemelle, Doraemon, and All'arrembaggio!) were released on vinyl as part of a Cristina D'Avena picture disc. The song Rossana was also re-released.

Vanni updated his live repertoire with songs like Occhi di gatto and Lucky Luke, as well as acoustic covers of Capitan Harlock and Piccoli problemi di cuore. He and Longhi also incorporated a DJ set featuring remixes of their tracks, originally from the Cartuno compilations.

=== 2016–2019: YouTube success and Toon Tunz ===
In August 2016, capitalizing on the worldwide success of the Pokémon Go mobile game, Vanni released a music video for the song Pokémon Go, composed with Max Longhi and written by Alessandra Valeri Manera. The track was also released on digital platforms.

Later that year, following Mediaset's acquisition of Dragon Ball Super, a new Italian theme song was requested. However, due to issues involving the duo and Toei Animation, the song was never officially used for the broadcast. Despite this, Vanni released the track, titled Dragon Ball Super Kame Hame Ha, on his YouTube channel on 23 December, coinciding with the Italian premiere of the series.

On 16 March 2017, Vanni, Longhi, and Valeri Manera collaborated again after five years to write a new song for Cristina D'Avena, Noi Puffi siam così (The Smurfs). Vanni also participated in Ninni Carucci's charity project to fund a music school in Amatrice following the August 2016 earthquake, performing the song Alza gli occhi e vai alongside various other musicians.

On 21 July 2017, Vanni released Sole e Luna, a reggaeton track dedicated to Pokémon: Sun and Moon. Later, on 24 November, he released Time Machine Reloaded, a new version of his previous cover album.

During this period, Vanni frequently collaborated with Italian YouTubers on new music and promotional content. He sang Santa Claus Is Coming to Town for a prank video by TheShow, performed Bruco Gianluco (written by cartoonist and YouTuber Sio), and appeared in various parodies with iPantellas.

In 2018, Vanni collaborated on Dj Matrix and Matt Joe's album Musica da giostra - Volume 5, providing vocals for the dance track Supereroi. Returning to television themes after years of inactivity, he wrote and composed Lupin ladro full-time and Rubami ancora il cuore for Mediaset's broadcast of Lupin the Third Part 5. He also performed Energia ardente and Limit Break, the Italian opening and ending themes for Cardfight!! Vanguard: Asia Circuit. Additionally, he composed and sang Gormiti the Legend is Back for the RAI network.

In 2019, he collaborated again with Dj Matrix and Matt Joe on Musica da giostra - Volume 6 with the song Onda dopo onda.

In early 2019, Vanni announced that he and Max Longhi were working on a new album. Concurrently, a limited "special edition" vinyl of Dragon Ball Super Kame Hame Ha was released as a non-profit initiative to support the Italian web radio station RadioAnimati.

On 18 April 2019, Vanni announced the title of his new album, Toon Tunz. The title is a play on the words "cartoon" and "tunz tunz" (a slang term referring to the heavy bass of dance music). The album marked the first official release of his works produced between 2016 and 2019.

== Discography ==
Tomato

Grande cuore

Giorgio Vanni Project - I cartoni di Italia1

Time Machine - Da Goldrake a Goku

Super Hits - Il meglio del meglio del meglio

Time Machine Reloaded - Da Goldrake a Goku (Dragon Ball)

Toon Tunz

ChalkZone Theme Song (ChalkZone)

== Videography ==
Giorgio Vanni's videography includes music videos filmed in the 1990s for his album Grande cuore, as well as newer videos released on YouTube since 2016.
