= Coconino Press =

Italian comic book publisher

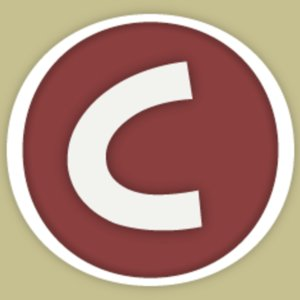
- Logo for Coconino Press
- Founded: 2000
- Country of origin: Italy
- Headquarters location: Roma, Italy
- Key people: Igort, Ratigher
- Publication types: Books, Comic books, Magazines
- Imprints: Ignatz Series
- Official website: www.coconinopress.it

Coconino Press is an Italian publisher of comic books, founded in 2000 in Bologna, Italy.

They are notable for their translations of comic books from around the world, including the Americans Daniel Clowes, Jason Lutes, Simon Hanselmann and Adrian Tomine; Canadians Seth and Chester Brown; French cartoonists David B., Baru and Emmanuel Guibert; the Japanese cartoonists Jiro Taniguchi and Suehiro Maruo; as well as the Italians Gipi, Davide Reviati, Francesca Ghermandi, Davide Toffolo, Sergio Ponchione, Igort, Zuzu, Vincenzo FIlosa, Simone Angelini, Filippo Scozzàri, Massimo Mattioli, Altan and Ratigher.

Coconino Press is also partnered with Seattle-based Fantagraphics Books under the imprint of the Ignatz Series.
