= The Happiest Man in the World (2018 film) =

2018 mockumentary film

- Film poster
- Italian: Il ragazzo più felice del mondo
- Directed by: Gipi
- Written by: Gipi; Gero Arnone
- Produced by: Domenico Procacci
- Starring: Gipi; Gero Arnone; Davide Barbafiera; Francesco Daniele
- Cinematography: Vanni Mastrantonio
- Edited by: Chiara Dainese
- Music by: Valerio Vigliar; Campos
- Distributed by: Fandango
- Release date: September 1, 2018 (75th Venice International Film Festival)
- Running time: 90 minutes
- Country: Italy
- Language: Italian

The Happiest Man In The World (Italian: Il ragazzo più felice del mondo) is a 2018 comedy-mockumentary film directed by Gipi.

The film premiered at the 75th Venice International Film Festival on 1 September 2018 and was released in theatres the next 8 November.

== Plot ==
The cartoonist Gianni Pacinotti, known professionally as Gipi, is obsessed with the need to tell stories but struggles to find the right inspiration to draw. His recent idea for creating an explicit homoerotic film titled La vita di Adelo has been rejected by producer Domenico Procacci. One day, while going through the boxes from an old move, he finds a letter he received twenty years earlier when he was not yet famous and was drawing for a small publishing house. The letter was from a fifteen-year-old boy who declared himself a fan and requested an autographed drawing from his idol. Gipi discovers that over the past twenty years, fifty other Italian cartoonists had received the same letter, written in the same way, with the same request and address, and all the letters claimed to be from a "teenager". Gipi feels he has a great story to tell and calls his friends—misanthropic Gero, hypochondriac musician Davide, and a cameraman who is never on camera and whose name no one ever remembers—to form a crew and shoot a documentary. For the finale, Gipi plans to involve all the Italian cartoonists who have received the letter over the years and visit the fan's home to draw together for him.

== Cast ==
- Gipi as Gianni
- Gero Arnone as Gero
- Davide Barbafiera as Davide
- Francesco Daniele as Francesco
- Chiara Palmieri as Gianni's wife
- Anna Bellato as the manager of Megaproduzioni
- Nathanaël Poupin as Nat
- Michele Rossi as Rosso
- Giorgia Spinelli as the graphologist
- Mauro Uzzeo as the psychic
- Andrea Josè Di Pasquale as the cameraman
- Domenico Procacci as himself
- Kasia Smutniak as herself
- Jasmine Trinca as herself

The film includes cameos of cartoonists Emiliano Mammucari, Giacomo Nanni, Laura Scarpa, Margherita Tramutoli, comic book editor and publisher Francesco Coniglio, and the band Campos. The theatre ensemble "Sacchi di sabbia" (Giovanni Guerrieri, Gabriele Carli, Giulia Gallo, Vincenzo Illiano) plays the cavemen.
