= Toon Tunz =

Studio album by Giorgio Vanni
- Released: May 10, 2019
- Recorded: 2016–2019
- Genre: Pop
- Length: 65:22
- Label: Lova Music
- Producers: Max Longhi and Giorgio Vanni

Giorgio Vanni chronology
Time Machine - Da Goldrake a Goku (2018)	Toon Tunz (2019)

Singles from Toon Tunz
- 1. "Pokémon Go" Released: 5 August 2016; 2. "Dragon Ball Super Kame Hame Ha" Released: 23 December 2016; 3. "Sole e Luna" Released: 21 July 2017; 4. "Supereroi" Released: 28 March 2018; 5. "Movieland luci, camera, azione!" Released: 18 May 2018; 6. "Bruco Gianluco" Released: 11 June 2018; 7. "Lupin ladro full-time" Released: 18 December 2018; 8. "Dragon Ball Super Kame Hame Ha (2019)" Released: 16 March 2019; 9. "Toon Tunz (Noi siamo quelli del...)" Released: 3 May 2019

Toon Tunz is the seventh studio album by Italian artist Giorgio Vanni, released on 10 May 2019 via Lova Music.

== Background ==
Album production was revealed on 14 January 2019 in an Instagram story on the artist's profile. Various songs of the tracklist were confirmed in that story. The following day in a radio interwiev at Radiobicocca, Gormiti un'altra avventura and Gormiti, the Legend is Back were confirmed in the tracklist but the first one at the release of the album wasn't into album tracklist. Then, during the presentation of the 45 vinyl of Dragon Ball Super Kame Hame Ha, Giorgio confirmed the release date for the album on 26 April but that date was only for the participants of Napoli Comicon 2019.

== The album ==
On 10 May 2019, the artist publishes some teaser trailer of the cover of the album that sees Giorgio Vanni on a throne. The album has all the singles from Pokémon Go to Dragon Ball Super Kame Hame Ha (Remix), some of the cartoons themes written in the previous years, an unpublished new song that takes the name from the title of the album. There's also Yu-Gi-Oh GX, a song of 2006 that was published only in some RTI Music's compilation.

The first pages of the booklet are full of photos took from Giorgio Vanni's lives and a message from him. There's also a two-pages photo of Giorgio Vanni and Max Longhi and the credits of the songs at the end of the booklet. Some of the titles of the songs have been a bit changed from their registration into SIAE and their single version as well . That happened for Dragon Ball Super Kame Hame Ha, Rubami ancora il cuore and Sole e Luna.

The digital album version has a different tracklist from the CD version with four less songs.

== Tracklist ==
CD Tracklist

No.	Title	Lyrics	Music	Length
1.	"Toon Tunz (Noi siamo quelli del...)" (feat. Amedeo Preziosi)	Giorgio Vanni, Max Longhi, Daniele Cuccione and Amedeo Preziosi	Max Longhi and Daniele Cuccione	3:35
2.	"My Hero Academia"	Alessandra Valeri Manera	Max Longhi and Giorgio Vanni	2:54
3.	"Dragon Ball Super Kame Hame Ha"	Alessandra Valeri Manera	Max Longhi and Giorgio Vanni	3:26
4.	"Lupin ladro Full-Time"	Alessandra Valeri Manera	Max Longhi and Giorgio Vanni	2:40
5.	"Yu Gi Oh! GX"	Alessandra Valeri Manera	Max Longhi and Giorgio Vanni	3:04
6.	"Pokémon Go"	Alessandra Valeri Manera	Max Longhi and Giorgio Vanni	2:56
7.	"Bruco Gianluco"	Simone Albrigi	Simone Albrigi	3:36
8.	"Gormiti the Legend is Back"	Alessandra Valeri Manera	Daniele Cuccione Max Longhi and Giorgio Vanni	3:19
9.	"Supereroi (Daniel Tek Remix)"	Giacomo Mazzoni, Matteo Schiavo, Giorgio Vanni and Max Longhi	Giacomo Mazzoni, Matteo Schiavo, Giorgio Vanni and Max Longhi	3:30
10.	"Mecardimal Go!"	Jamie Simone	John Majkut	2:15
11.	"Rubami ancora il cuore"	Max Longhi and Giorgio Vanni	Max Longhi and Giorgio Vanni	3:05
12.	"Movieland luci, camera, azione!"	Alessia Spera	Max Longhi and Giorgio Vanni	3:29
13.	"Onda dopo onda"	Alessia Spera	Max Longhi and Giorgio Vanni	3:30
14.	"Sole e Luna"	Alessandra Valeri Manera and Alessia Spera	Max Longhi and Giorgio Vanni	3:50
15.	"Diabolik" (Live)	Alessandra Valeri Manera	Max Longhi and Giorgio Vanni	3:55
16.	"Bebyblade Mashup" (Live)	Alessandra Valeri Manera	Max Longhi and Giorgio Vanni	5:09
17.	"Diabolik" (Acapella)	Alessandra Valeri Manera	Max Longhi and Giorgio Vanni	3:37
18.	"Lupin, ladro full time (Daniel Tek vs DJ Fellea's Remix)" (Daniel Tek vs DJ Fellea's Remix)	Alessandra Valeri Manera	Max Longhi and Giorgio Vanni	4:01
19.	"Dragon Ball Super Kame Hame Ha (Daniel Tek Remix)" (Daniel Tek Remix)	Alessandra Valeri Manera	Max Longhi and Giorgio Vanni	3:31
Total length:				65:22

Digital Download

No.	Title	Length
1.	"Toon Tunz (Noi siamo quelli del...)"	3:35
2.	"My Hero Academia"	2:54
3.	"Dragon Ball Super Kame Hame Ha"	3:26
4.	"Pokémon Go"	2:56
5.	"Bruco Gianluco"	3:36
6.	"Gormiti the Legend is Back"	3:19
7.	"Supereroi"	3:30
8.	"Mecardimal Go!"	2:15
9.	"Movieland luci, camera, azione!"	3:29
10.	"Onda dopo onda"	3:30
11.	"Sole e Luna"	3:50
12.	"Diabolik" (Live)	3:55
13.	"Bebyblade Mashup" (Live)	5:09
14.	"Diabolik" (Acapella)	3:37
15.	"Dragon Ball Super Kame Hame Ha (Daniel Tek Remix)"	3:31
Total length:		52:32

== Album production ==
- Max Longhi – Executive Producer
- Giorgio Vanni – Executive Producer
- Daniele Cuccione – Music production, assistant and coordinator
- RTI S.p.A. – Executive Producer for Yu-Gi-Oh! GX, Lupin ladro Full-Time and Rubami ancora il cuore
- Movieland – Executive Producer for Movieland luci, camera, azione!
- Danceonline – Executive Producer for Supereroi e Onda dopo onda
- Giochi Preziosi S.p.A. – Executive Producer for Gormiti the Legend is Back
- Mattel – Executive Producer for Mecardimal Go
- Angelo Antonuccio – Studio Photos and Artwork
- Roby Manini – Layout
- Pietro Caramelli – Mastering at Energymaster (Milano)

== Charts ==
Chart (2019)	Peak position
Italy	57
