= Lelio Bonaccorso =

Italian comic artist and illustrator

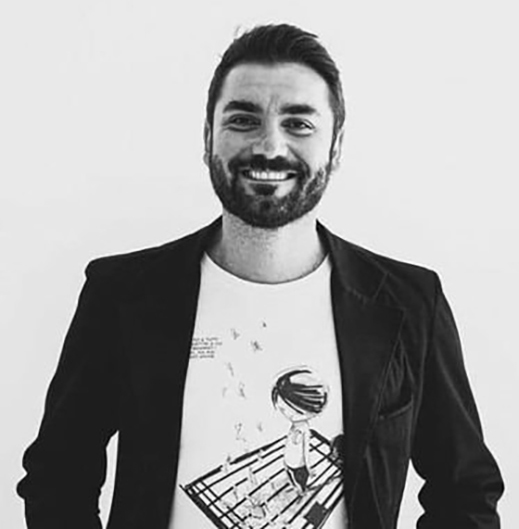
- Lelio Bonaccorso in 2021
- Born: 2 August 1982 (age 43); Messina, Sicily, Italy
- Occupations: Comic book writer and artist
- Years active: 2009–present

Lelio Bonaccorso (born 2 August 1982 in Messina, Sicily, Italy), is an Italian comic artist and illustrator.

He collaborated with prestigious Italian newspapers such as Corriere della Sera (La Lettura), La Gazzetta dello Sport, L'Unità, Wired and participated in various comic festivals such as Lucca Comics, Napoli Comicon, Etna Comics, Lamezia Comics by exhibiting personal and collective works.

His foreign collaborations, mainly with France, made him well-known also abroad, particularly in Europe, North America and Latin America.

He taught at the School of Comics in Palermo and in Messina. He specialised both in graphic journalism, for which he was awarded in many public occasions, and pop comics, for which Bonaccorso can boasts collaborations with publishing houses as Marvel and Disney.

== Biography ==
Lelio Bonaccorso was born in Messina (Sicily), where he attended the local art school. He continued his studies at the School of Comics in Palermo, where he met the screenwriter Marco Rizzo, with which he began a long and successful collaboration started with the publication, in 2009, of the comic "Peppino Impastato un giullare contro la mafia" (BeccoGiallo), which won the Satire Prize in Forte dei Marmi, the Giancarlo Siani Prize in Naples and the Boscarato Prize for best screenplay.

Their collaboration continues with the publishing of other comics as “Gli ultimi giorni di Marco Pantani" (Rizzoli Lizard), "Que Viva el Che Guevara" (BeccoGiallo), "Jan Karski. L’uomo che scoprì l’olocausto" (Rizzoli Lizard), "Gli Arancini di Montalbano" (La Gazzetta dello Sport), “La mafia spiegata ai bambini" and “L’immigrazione spiegata ai bambini” (Beccogiallo) "Salvezza" and "A casa nostra...cronaca da Riace" (Feltrinelli), the latter also published in France for Futuropolis.

In 2012 Bonaccorso started to collaborate with Marvel and DC Comics/Vertigo. Moreover, this collaboration with the Italian Panini Comics lead him to the realisation of a series of illustrations of the X-Men (Panini/Marvel), of a monthly cover of the Justice League (Panini/DC Comics) and of a poster for Warner Bros and Panini/Dcomics.

Between 2013 and 2021 he published: "Á bord de l'Aquarius" and "Chez nous" with Marco Rizzo (Futuropolis); "Vendetta", "Le Pére Turc" and "Le Sarde" (Glénat) with the screenwriter Loulou Dédola; "Caravaggio e la ragazza" based on a script by Nadia Terranova (Feltrinelli); ”The Passenger" (Tunué) and "Sinai, la terra illuminata dal sole" (BeccoGiallo, Futuropolis).

He edited the illustrations of the books: "Il leggendario Federico II" by Valentina Certo (Giambra), "Capi, colleghi, carriere. Questi sconosciuti" by Marco Morelli (Gribaudo), “Ho visto un re”, by Simone Giorgi (Gribaudo).

In collaboration with the Sicilian director Antonello Piccione, Bonaccorso created several animated shorts films, among them was "U Piscispada". and "To the stars", which was awarded with various national and international prizes.

Furthermore, he took part in the group exhibition promoted by the Arezzo Wave festival, whose works of art were auctioned off by Sotheby's Milan for charity.

Finally, he realised storyboards for commercials, including "Tuscanini" and “The Italian good style" for Caruso, by Giancarlo Giannini, winner of the Bokeh Fashion Film Festival in South Africa.

In December 2021 Bonaccorso organised and the exhibition “Illustrazioni e fumetti al MuMe", in partnership with the Management of the Regional Museum of Messina (MuMe), in which he exhibited his works together with those of the artists Michela De Domenico and Fabio Franchi.

He holds training courses, seminars and meetings in various universities, schools and associations, e.g. the Chile Institute of Italian Culture.

== Works ==
- Resistenze, BeccoGiallo, 2007
- 13, Alien Press
- Avatar, Cronache di Topolinia
- Mono, Tunuè
- Zero tolleranza, BeccoGiallo, 2008
- Peppino Impastato. Un giullare contro la mafia, BeccoGiallo, 2009
- Gli ultimi giorni di Marco Pantani, Rizzoli Lizard, 2011
- Primo, Edizioni BD, 2011
- Que viva el Che Guevara, BeccoGiallo, 2011
- Gli arancini di Montalbano, La Gazzetta dello Sport, 2009
- Chi si ricorda di Nino Agostino?, in La Lettura 38, Corriere della Sera, 2012
- Fear itself the homefront, Marvel Comics, 2012
- The Unexpected, DC Comics - Vertigo, 2012
- L'invasione degli scarafaggi. La mafia spiegata ai bambini, BeccoGiallo, 2012
- Il Satiro rubato, in La Lettura 66, Corriere della Sera, 2013
- Jan Karski. L'uomo che scoprì l'Olocausto, Rizzoli Lizard, 2014
- Jan Karski, in La Lettura 113, Corriere della Sera, 2014.
- Uno, nessuno, centomila migranti, in Wired Italia 63, Condé Nast Italia, 2014
- 419 African Mafia, Ankama Editions, 2014
- La traiettoria delle Lucciole, BeccoGiallo, 2015
- L'immigrazione spiegata ai bambini, BeccoGiallo, 2016
- The Passenger, Tunuè, 2016
- Sinai, la terra illuminata dalla luna, Beccogiallo, 2017
- Three stories in the mini-series "I pirati dei Caraibi", Disney, 2017
- Le pére turc, Glénat, 2018
- Salvezza, Feltrinelli, 2018
- ... A casa nostra. Cronaca da Riace, Feltrinelli, 2019
- À bord de l'Aquarius, Futuropolis, 2019
- To the stars (verso le stelle), animated short film, 2019
- Tarocchi Siciliani, 2019
- Capi, colleghi, carriere. Questi sconosciuti, Gribaudo, 2020
- Il leggendario Federico II, Giambra, 2020
- Cover for Justice League - City edition, DC Comics/Panini, 2020
- Dylan Dog Color Fest, Sergio Bonelli Editore, 2020
- Ho visto un re, Gribaudo, 2020
- Caravaggio e la ragazza, Feltrinelli, 2021
- Le Sarde, Glénat, 2021
- Chez Nous, Futuropolis, 2021
- X-Men cards, Panini/Marvel, 2021
- Sinai, la terre qu'illumine la lune, Futuropolis, 2021
- Vendetta, Steinkis, 2021
- DC Super Challenge poster, Panini/ DCcomics, 2021
- Vento di libertà, Tunué, 2022
- Pour que le crime ne paie plus, La Revue dessiné, 2022

== Awards ==
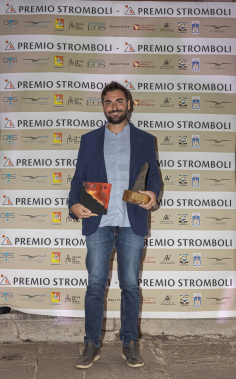
Bonaccorso at the Premio Stromboli award ceremony

- 2009:
  - Giancarlo Siani award for the best comics book (Peppino Impastato, un giullare contro la mafia, ex aequo with Don Peppe Diana, per amore del mio popolo, Round Robin)
  - Satira award for the best graphic novel (Peppino Impastato, un giullare contro la mafia)
  - Carlo Boscarato award for the best Italian screenwriter (Peppino Impastato, un giullare contro la mafia).
- 2015: Cezam award (Jan Karski, l'homme qui a decouvert l'Holocauste)
- 2018:
  - Etnacomics award for the best graphic journalism comics book (Salvezza)
  - "Tutino giornalista" award (Salvezza)
  - Carlo Boscarato award for the best screenplay (Salvezza)
  - Andrea Pazienza award for the best comics artist (Sinai - La terra illuminata dalla Luna)
- 2019:
  - Phlegraean Film Festival award for the best animated short film (To the stars)
  - Celtic Animation Film Festival award for the best international short film (To the stars)
  - CortiSonanti Short Film Festival special mention for the graphic style (To the stars)
  - Corti di Dosolo Festival mention (To the stars)
- 2020: Orvieto Festival dei diritti second place award (To the stars)
- 2021: Stromboli award for the graphic novel section
