= Filippo Scòzzari =

Italian comics author and writer

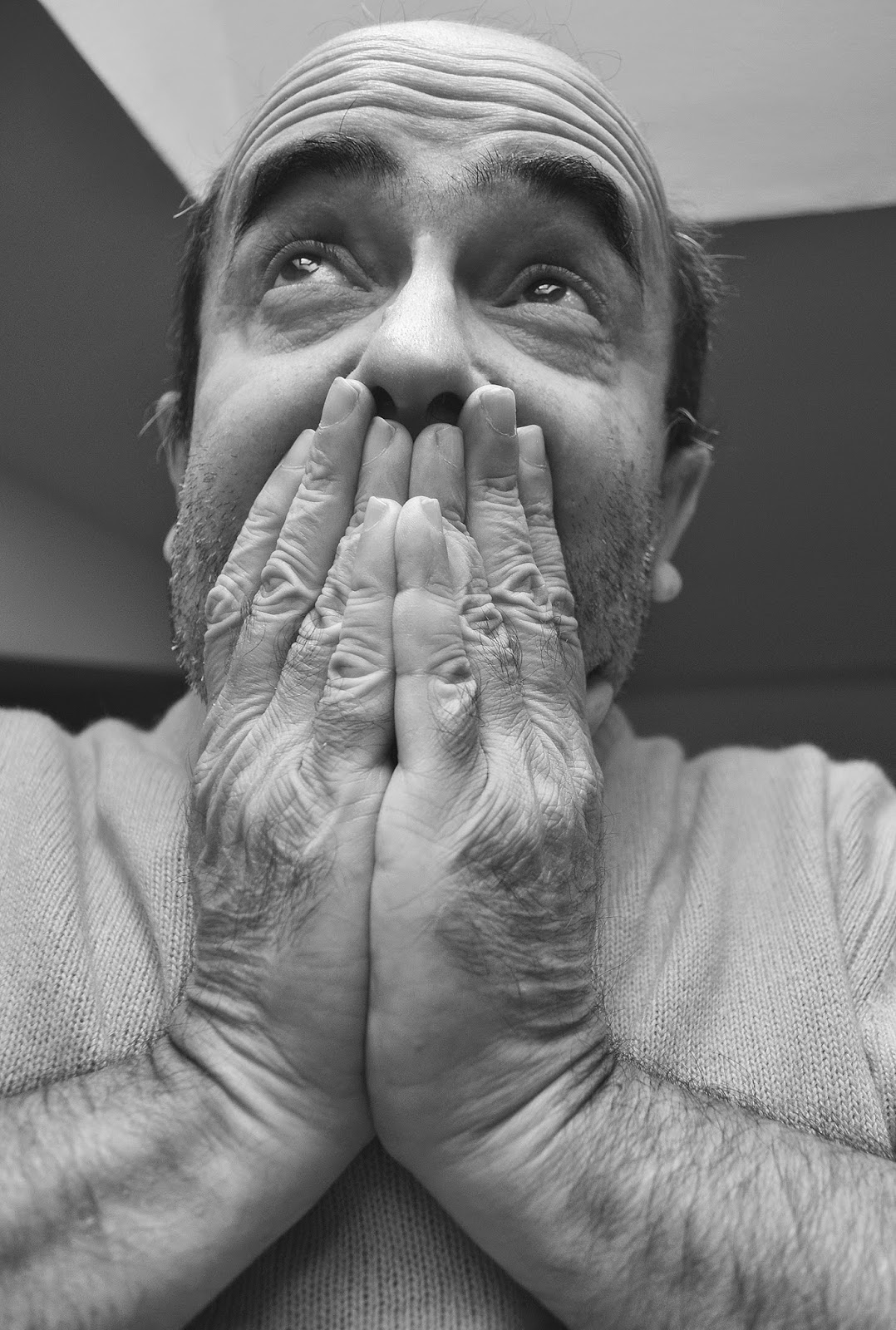
Filippo Scozzari, March 2015

Filippo Scòzzari (born 30 August 1946) is an Italian comics artist, painter, and writer, born in Bologna. He is one of the main figures of the 1970s Italian underground comics movement.

Known for his first comic at Mondadori's Il Mago under the pen name Winslow Leech, he worked for Re Nudo and Il Mago, Radio Alice of Bologna, Cannibale, Il Male, Frigidaire, Blue, Panorama, TV Sorrisi e Canzoni and Glamour International.

== Career ==
His career began in the 1970s, appearing in various underground satirical publications; in 1979 he collaborated with the satirical weekly publication Il Male, and in the subsequent years he was published in Frizzer, Tempi Supplementari, Il Lunedì della Repubblica and was among the founders of the comic magazines Cannibale and Frigidaire.

During the same years he also appeared in Re Nudo, Linus, Vogue, Spaceships Today, Panorama, and Alteralter.

His comics have been published in France, Brazil, and Greece.

Most of his comics have been collected in eight books published in Italy by Primo Carnera Editore and Coniglio Editore, in France by Albin Michel, and in Brazil by Conrad Editora.

He wrote six novels, an anthology of pornographic tales, and a theatrical work, Heart in Slices. He held several exhibitions in Italy: in Rimini, in Montecchio Emilia, in Rome, in Reggio Emilia, in Milan, in Turin, in Bologna and, abroad, in Athens.

Among his comic books are: a graphic novel based on Raymond Chandler's screenplay The Blue Dahlia (La Dalia Azzurra, 1981), a collection of stories from his underground period (Doctor Jack, 1982), a collection of his early science fiction short stories (Mud and Oxygen, 1992) and various collections of the comics formerly published in Frigidaire (Women, 1987, Sister Big Tooth & Other Battles, 1992).

== Works ==
- Primo Carnera, cartoons, Roma, Primo Carnera Editore, 1982
- La dalia azzurra, cartoons, Roma, Primo Carnera Editore, 1982 [Ristampa Coniglio Editore 2006 e Editoriale Cosmo 2017]
- Dottor Jack, cartoons, Roma, Primo Carnera Editore, 1983
- Donne (odori, nei, peli e altri fantasmi), cartoons, Roma, Primo Carnera Editore, 1985
- Suor Dentona (e altre battaglie), cartoons, Roma, Primo Carnera Editore, 1988 [Integral edition Mompracem, 2012]
- Fango e ossigeno, cartoons, Roma, Primo Carnera Editore, 1988
- Altri cieli, Roma, sci-fi cartoons, Primo Carnera Editore, 1992
- Cuore di Edmondo, theatrical text, Bologna, Granata Press, 1993
- XXXX! Racconti porni, anthology of stories, Roma, Castelvecchi, 1996 Coniglio Editore, 2008. ISBN 88-8210-011-1
- Prima pagare poi ricordare. Da «Cannibale» a «Frigidaire». Storia di un manipolo di ragazzi geniali, diary, Roma, Castelvecchi, 1997 [Ristampa Coniglio Editore, 2004, ISBN 88-88833-13-7]
- Figate, illustrations, Mare nero, 1999. ISBN 888-74-9502-5
- L'Isterico a Metano, novel, Milano, Mondadori, 1999. ISBN 8804472685
- Memorie dell'arte bimba, diary, Roma, Coniglio Editore, 2008. ISBN 88-6063-111-4
- Proverbi afghani, anthology of illustrated proverbs, Genova, Grrrzetic, 2009. ISBN 978-88-96250-00-6
- Filippo Scòzzari e l'Insonnia Occidentale, anthology of stories, Roma, Coniglio Editore, 2011. ISBN 978-88-6063-219-7
- Prima pagare poi ricordare. Fanciulli pazzi. Tutta La Storia, diary, Roma, Fandango Libri, 2017. ISBN 978-88-6044-499-8
- Lassù no, sci-fi cartoons, postfaction by Daniele Mari, Roma, Fandango Libri, 2019. ISBN 978-88-7618-4260
