= Riccardo Mannelli =

Italian artist and illustrator

Riccardo Mannelli (born 20 January 1955), is an Italian artist and illustrator.

Born in Pistoia, he has lived and worked in Rome since 1977. He graduated as a surveyor and began attending the School of Architecture in Florence without finishing his studies.

Since 1975 Mannelli has been working with Italian satirical magazines (Il Male, which was one of the founders, Cuore, Boxer), with comic magazines as Linus and Alter Linus, and with newspapers and magazines such as Playmen, Blue (Coniglio Editore), L’Europeo, La Stampa, Il Messaggero, Lotta Continua, Il Manifesto, La Repubblica, Il Fatto Quotidiano and abroad L’Heco des Savanes (France), Humor, pagina 12 (Argentina), Il caffe (Locarno)

He was the author of illustrated reportages first for La Repubblica then for Cuore. Between 1982 and 1983, he lived for three months in Nicaragua and brought to completion one of the first examples of what would have been then defined graphic journalism: a live reportage that portrays through drawings accompanied by captions, the plight of the country at the time of the guerrillas unleashed by the counterrevolutionaries. He went later in the former Yugoslavia, "In the war, under the bombs as an idiot", he says in an interview with the newspaper La Repubblica: "Usually journalists, in places of war, work from the hotels collecting agencies. But I demanded permits and I rented a car and went to see personally [...]. I start and draw. I do it from the battlefields, from cafes, from the inside of a compact car with which I have roamed in the 1980s to 20 thousand kilometers".

Alongside the activities of journalism artist and illustrator, Mannelli carried out a personal painting research, presented over the years in numerous exhibitions and festivals: from Global Soup (1999 - Galleria AAM), Signs and Designs (Tricromia Art Gallery) and the pictorial cycle Stanze di Guerra(2001), from which flows the multimedia performance Electric Cabaret.

In 2008 he recorded the cycle Apotheosis of the corrupt, projected as a virtual frieze on the outside wall of the Ara Pacis in Rome.

Of 2009 is the exhibition Tender Barbarians, built together with the Czech photographer Jan Saudek.

In 2011 he exhibited for the first time the entire cycle of paintings in 60 works in Comedy in Zone Zones of Exhibition of the Ruins of the Occident), as part of the Art Exhibitions at the 54th Spoleto Festival.

Invited to the 54th Venice Biennale, he exhibited three works in the Italian Pavilion.

Also, in 2011 he received the award Forte dei Marmi for Political Satire. Of 2012, is the exhibition in progress Notes for the reconstruction of beautyat Galleria Gagliardi San Gimignano and the book-by-true A. for Tricromia Art Gallery.

In 2013, he released the volume Fine Penna Mai, published by Mompracem.

in 2015 is the exhibition Rops + Mannelli. Incantations / Anatomies of the spirit, at Philobiblon Gallery in February e Palazzo Ducale (Urbino) in march

Currently, Mannelli teaches Live Drawing and Anatomy at the European Institute of Design.

== Books ==
With Mannelli, most of the times, joke and drawing become one, that is close to perfection, and when we see them appear on the page, they leave us speechless. They are never connected with this or that event, then will never expire. They are relics of an era. More effective than a flawless editorial, more fulminant than a well managed title." Preface by Marco Travaglio, in Riccardo Mannelli. Fine penna mai, Lit Editions, Rome 2013

"With a genuine curiosity in dimension of our morbid thoughts, Riccardo Mannelli drags and involves us in a cruel reality, of erotic obsessions, of disturbance, of torments of the flesh, in a rework of The 120 Days of Sodom by Pier Paolo Pasolini". Vittorio Sgarbi, in Art Exhibitions in the 54th Festival dei Due Mondi in Spoleto, Antiga Editions, 2011

"There are two things that Riccardo Mannelli’s paintings communicate: the first is that the story of the adventures and misadventures of the soul is surely written in the body, the second is that the body brings us into the undifferentiated disturbing scenario, from which men are emancipated to inaugurate their own story, but from which they must be accompanied if they do not want to extinguish. Keepers of this ambivalence are the artists who are able to draw on original chaos". Umberto Galimberti, in Comedy in Z.E.R.O, Art Core Editions, Perugia 2006

"One should remind his ability to develop complex mixed techniques, where the calligraphic stroke of pencils, ballpoints and pens, is combined with different pigments - pastels, watercolors, oil and chalks - set for subsequent coats on absorbent substrates of cotton-paper". Luca Arnaudo, in Rops + Mannelli. Incantations / Anatomies of the spirit, 2015
