= Tre Allegri Ragazzi Morti =

Italian rock band

- Origin: Pordenone, Italy
- Genres: Punk rock; indie rock; alternative rock; reggae; folk
- Years active: 1994–present
- Label: La Tempesta
- Members: Davide Toffolo; Enrico Molteni; Luca Masseroni
- Website: treallegriragazzimorti.it

Tre allegri ragazzi morti (Three cheerful dead boys in Italian, often stylized as TARM) is an Italian indie rock band formed in Pordenone, Friuli-Venezia Giulia, in 1994.

== History ==
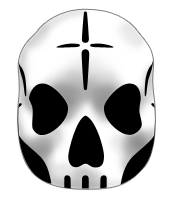
The band uses a skull mask during all concerts

Guitarist and comic artist Davide Toffolo started to play music in the late '70s, when Pordenone became one of the most important cities for the Italian punk rock scene, due to its closeness to the American military base of Aviano. At the time, there was a movement of young musicians called Great Complotto, which gave birth to several small punk rock and new wave groups. They all had a short life, but the line-up of one of them, Futuritmi (1983–1990), featured Davide Toffolo and Gian Maria Accusani, leader of the later famous band Prozac+.
Tre Allegri Ragazzi Morti were formed in this state of ferment by Toffolo and drummer Luca Casta (stage name of Luca Masseroni). The bass player Enrico Molteni would join the group for the release of their third EP, Si parte (Leaving). After the release of the first three singles, ignored by the critics, the band recorded their first studio album, Piccolo intervento a vivo (Little live operation), which featured new tracks and live records of some previous songs. This album caught the attention of the record label BMG Ricordi, and the band signed a contract with it for the next LP, titled Mostri e normali (Monsters and normals). The contract was soon broken because TARM opened their own independent record label, La Tempesta. After that they released an online EP, Il principe in bicicletta (Prince on the bike), and all the following albums.

In October 2005 the band toured Uruguay and Argentina with other bands from the Friuli-Venezia Giulia region, included Arbegarbe, Kosovni Odpadki and Kraški Ovčarji. In 2008, the group appeared in the movie As God Commands, directed by Gabriele Salvatores, and took part in its soundtrack.

The band members decided to hide their identities from the media and to imagine themselves inside the comics of Davide Toffolo, who was also a popular cartoonist. They would also hide their faces from the public during all concerts, wearing a skull mask and not letting the fans take pictures or videos when they take the mask down. They wear the skull masks, which later became their symbol and fetish, even during their few interviews on television.

The record label La Tempesta releases works by TARM and other artists, related or not, included Il Teatro degli Orrori, Giorgio Canali, Moltheni and Le luci della centrale elettrica.

From September 2008, Davide Toffolo has released three comic books (published by Coconino Press) which contain the completed series of his greatest work: Cinque Allegri Ragazzi Morti (Five happy dead boys). Every book features a CD of TARM: the first CD is a Greatest Hits from 2000 to 2007, the second features rare tracks and b-sides, while the third is their debut album Mondo Naif (1994).

In 2010 the group released a new album titled Primitivi del Futuro, with some different sounds, included "upbeat rhythms and Caribbean hints", as Molteni said.

In 2012 their new album titled "Nel giardino dei fantasmi" featuring a mix up of their previous musical experience: from r'n'r to songwriting, from dub to folk, showing an increasing interest in folk/popular music and songs.

In 2014 they acted with a little piece in the film-comedy Sexy Shop.

== Line-up ==
- Davide Toffolo - voice, guitar
- Enrico Molteni - bass guitar
- Luca Masseroni - drums

== Discography ==
=== Studio and live ===
- Piccolo intervento a vivo (Little live operation - with some live songs; 1997)
- Mostri e normali (Monsters and normals - 1999)
- La testa indipendente (The independent head - 2001)
- Il sogno del gorilla bianco (The dream of the white gorilla - 2004)
- La seconda rivoluzione sessuale (The second sexual revolution - 2007)
- Primitivi del futuro (Primitives of the future - 2010)
- Nel giardino dei fantasmi (In the garden of ghosts - 2012)
- Il fantastico introvabile live (The fantastic unfindable live - 2013)

=== Singles, demos and EPs ===
- Mondo naif (Naif world - 1994)
- Allegro pogo morto (Merry dead pogo - 1995)
- Si parte (Leaving - 1996)
- Il principe in bicicletta (Prince on the bike - 2000)

=== Collections ===
- Le origini (The origins - 2002)

=== Compilations ===
- 2002 - Nuova identità (New identity) in Fosbury: Primo Salto
- 2008 - Gennaio (January) in Il dono
- 2008 - Around the World in Post-Remixes vol.1
- 2010 - La faccia della luna (The moon's face) in Materiali Resistenti

== Covers & tributes ==
Tre allegri ragazzi morti often record covers of famous pieces (there's almost one in every released album).

- Per me lo so (from Piccolo intervento a vivo), cover of the same song by CCCP Fedeli alla linea (1987)
- Dimmi (from Mostri e normali), Italian version of Ask by The Smiths (1986)
- Tutto nuovo (from Le origini), adaptation of Suds & Soda by dEUS (1994)
- Mio fratellino ha scoperto il rock'n'roll (from La seconda rivoluzione sessuale), Italian version of My Little Brother degli Art Brut (2004)
- La tatuata bella, recorded in 2008 for the soundtrack of Italian movie Fuga dal call center, is the adaptation of a traditional northern Italian song.
- Around the World, recorded in 2008 for the compilation Post-Remixes vol.1 is an Italian version of Around the World by Daft Punk (1997)
