= Igort =

Italian artist and filmmaker (born 1958)

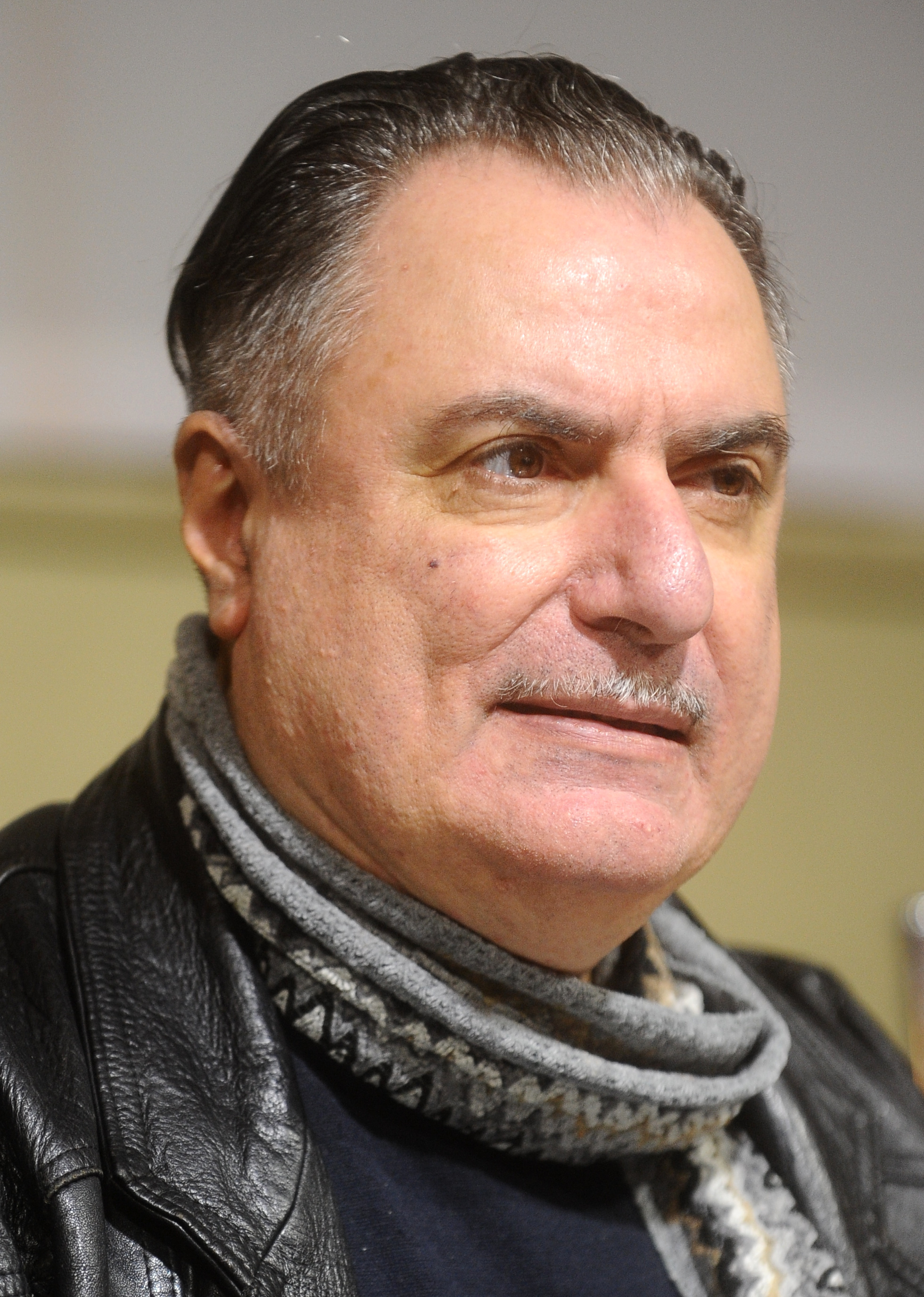
- Igort at the 2017 Lucca Comics & Games
- Born: Igor Tuveri; September 26, 1958 (age 68); Cagliari, Italy
- Occupation: Comics artist • Illustrator • Film director
- Years active: 1970s–present

Igort (born Igor Tuveri; September 26, 1958) is an Italian comics artist, illustrator, script writer, and film director.

== Biography ==
He began his career in Bologna at the end of the seventies, collaborating with numerous magazines: including linus, Alter, Frigidaire, Métal Hurlant, L'Écho des savanes, Vanity, and The Face. Since the nineties, he has collaborated with the Japanese publishing houses Kodansha, Brutus and Hon Hon do.

In 1994 he exhibited his works at the Venice Biennale.

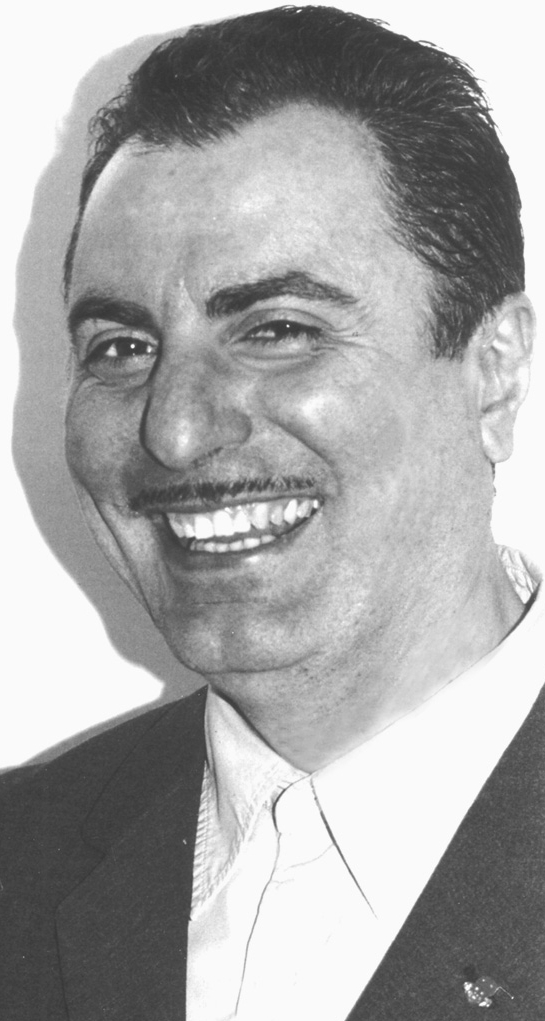
Igort at Lucca comics in 1998

In 2000 he founded the Coconino Press publishing house.

In 2002 he published 5 is the perfect number, a Neapolitan noir, that he began drawing in Tokyo and completed after about 10 years of processing and rewriting. The book, labeled Coconino Press, came out simultaneously in 6 countries and won the Book of the Year Award at the Frankfurt Book Fair. It is Igort's most popular book to date.

Fats Waller followed, an imaginative biography of one of the most popular Jazz musicians of the Thirties, in collaboration with the Argentine writer and screenwriter, Carlos Sampayo. Igort's work began to spread further abroad. He moved to Paris and began the Baobab series, which tells the parallel lives of a Japanese boy (Hiroshi Oolong) and a young South American (Celestino Villarosa). The Baobab series came out simultaneously in Italy, France, Spain, Holland, Germany and the United States.

In 2010, after a long residence between Ukraine, Russia and Siberia, Igort wrote and drew Ukrainian Notebooks, published in the Strade Blu series of Mondadori.

In 2011 he published Russian Notebooks, drawn following a report by the Russian journalist Anna Politkovskaja. The volume Pagine nomadi (Nomadic pages) follows, its publication coincides with the large exhibition dedicated to graphic journalism hosted at the Milan Triennale.

In 2013 he starred in the documentary Igort, the secret landscape, by director Domenico Distilo which illustrates the research carried out for the trilogy on the Soviet Union, the birth of the graphic novel and its relationship with the story through images.

In the last half of 2014, Igort announced on his personal Facebook page the publication of his next work, Japanese notebooks, a memoir, comic essay, travel book and drawn reportage that tells the author's years spent in Japan. In December of the same year Nostalgia is published, a book which is a preview of a work to be published. In November 2016, the novel My Generation came out, which concerns the Punk and New Wave era. In the same month he released Gli assalti alle panetterie (Assaults to the bakeries), a volume written by Haruki Murakami that Igort illustrated with watercolors.

On 21 February 2017 Igort announced on Facebook that he would be leaving Coconino Press because he is no longer able to do his job there serenely.

In 2019, Igort directed the live action adaptation of 5 is the Perfect Number, starring Toni Servillo and Valeria Golino.

== Main works ==
=== In English ===
- Dulled Feelings
- Baobab 1
- Baobab 2
- Baobab 3
- 5 is the Perfect Number
- Fats Waller
- The Ukrainian and Russian Notebooks
- Japanese Notebooks
- How War Begins

=== In Italian ===
- Goodbye Baobab, with Daniele Brolli, Rizzoli 1984
- That's all Folks. Granata Press, 1993
- Il letargo dei sentimenti. Granata Press, 1993
- Cartoon Aristocracy. Carbone, 1994
- Perfetti e invisibili. Skirà, 1996
- Yuri. Kodansha, 1996
- Brillo: i segreti del bosco antico. De Agostini, 1997 (CD ROM)
- Sinatra. Coconino Press, 2000
- City lights, Coconino Press, 2001
- Maccaroni Circus, Cut up 2001
- 5 è il Numero Perfetto. Coconino Press, 2002
- Il letargo dei Sentimenti. Coconino Press, 2002
- 5 Variations. John Belushi, 2002
- Brillo Croniche di Fafifurnia. Coconino Press, 2003
- Yuri, Asa Nisi masa. Coconino Press, 2003
- Fats Waller. Con Carlos Sampayo. Coconino Press, 2004
- Baobab 1. Coconino press, 2005
- Baobab 2. Coconino press, 2006
- Storyteller. Coconino Press, 2007
- Dimmi che non vuoi morire. With Massimo Carlotto. Mondadori 2007
- Casinò. Nocturne, 2007 (CD)
- Baobab 3. Coconino press, 2008
- Quaderni ucraini. Mondadori, 2010
- Parola di Chandler. With Raymond Chandler. Coconino Press, 2011
- Quaderni russi. Mondadori, 2011
- Pagine Nomadi, storie non ufficiali dell'Unione Sovietica. Coconino Press 2012
- Sinfonia a Bombay. Coconino Press 2013
- Quaderni ucraini, Coconino Press, 2014
- Quaderni Russi Nuova edizione, Coconino Press, 2014
- Nostalgia, Edizioni Oblomov, 2014
- Quaderni giapponesi, Coconino Press, 2015
- My Generation. Chiarelettere 2016
- Gli assalti alle panetterie. Einaudi 2016
- Ishiki no kashi. Oblomov 2017
- Quaderni Giapponesi vol 2 - Il vagabondo del manga. Oblomov 2017

=== In French ===
La lethargie des sentiments. Albin Michel 1987

L'enfer des desirs Les Humanos 1989.

Sinatra. Amok 2000

5 est le numero parfait. Casterman 2002

- La Ballade de Hambone. Tome 1 With Leila Marzocchi. Futuropolis 2009
- La ballade de Hambone. Tome 2 With Leila Marzocchi. Futuropolis 2010

Les Cahiers Ukrainiens. Futuropolis 2010

Les cahiers russes. Futuropolis 2012

Les Cahiers Japonais. Futuropolis 2015

Les cahiers Japonais tome 2. Futuropolis 2017

Les Cahiers Japonais tome 3. Futuropolis 2020

Encre sur papier. Ici Meme 2021

Kokoro – Le Son caché des choses. Ici Meme 2021

- Gauloises. With Andrea Serio. Futuropolis 2022

Journal d'une invasione. Futuropolis 2023

== Awards ==
- 2024 MoCCA Arts Fest Award of Excellence for How War Begins.
- 2017 Prize Golden Romics to career at XXI Edition of Romics.
- 2016 Winner of the "Premio Napoli" in Naples for the diffusion of italian culture in the world.
- 2016 Winner of the "Best artist" award at Naples' comic Festival. Comicon 2016 for "Quaderni Giapponesi".
- 2016 Winner of the "Author of the year" award in Lucca Comics Festival. 2016 for "Quaderni Giapponesi".
- 2013 Winner of "Mostra Internazionale dei Cartoonists" award in Rapallo, 2013, as best realistic artist.
- 2013 Winner of the "Best script " award for the "Cahiers russes" in Pibrac. Prix lycéen de la BD.
- 2013 U Giancu's Prize, International Cartoonists Exhibition, Rappollo, Italy
- 2012 Winner of the "Book of the year" award in Naples comic Festival. Comicon 2012 for "Quaderni Russi"
- 2012 Winner of the "Book of the year" award. Prix Region Centre. In Blois comic Festival.Comicon 2012 for "Les Caihers Russes"
- 2011 Winner of the "Prize in memory of Holodomor" in Paris, November 2011 for "Les cahiers Ukrainiens"
- 2011 Special prize at Napoli Comicon for Quaderni Ucraini
- 2007 Prize Italia Criminale at Treviso Comics for Dimmi che non vuoi morire
- 2006 Prize Best book of the year at Napoli Comicon for Fats Waller
- 2005 Winner of International event of the year award at Treviso Comics for Fats Waller
- 2004 Prize Lo straniero al Negroamaro festival (Lecce)
- 2004 Prize "libro jazz dell'anno" per Fats Waller al jazz festival "Swing a Xirocourt"
- 2003 Prize Best book of the year at Frankfurt Bookfair for 5 is the perfect number
- 2003 Prize Coccobill: best author at Milan comics festival Cartoomics
- 2003 Special prize A.N.A.F.I. (Associazione Nazionale Amici Fumetto Italiano)
- 2003 Grand prize at Romics for 5 è il numero perfetto
- 2002 Prize Pulcinella at Naples Comicon
