= Miguel Ángel Martín (comics) =

Spanish comic author and artist (born 1960)

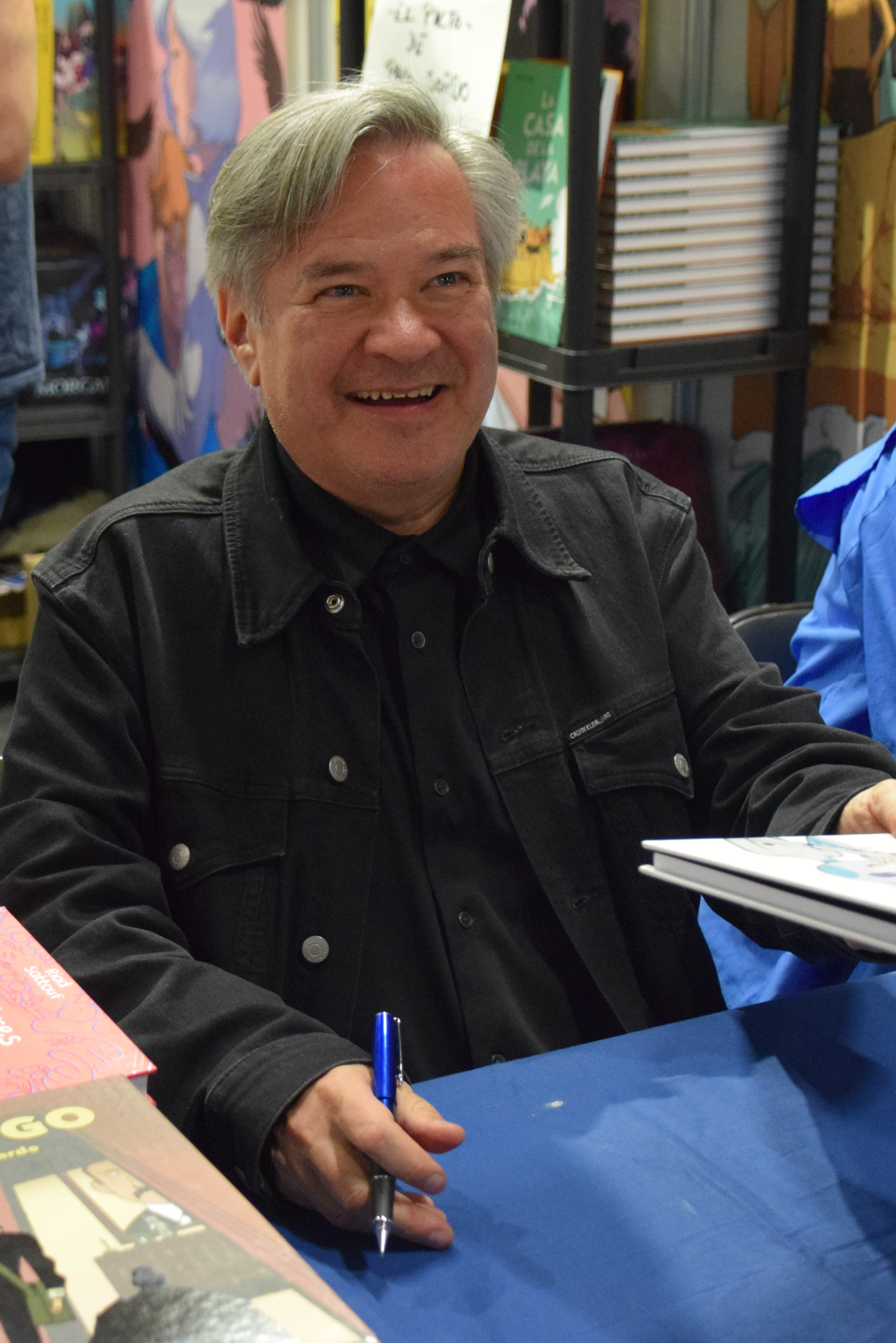
- Miguel Ángel Martín at the Barcelona Comic Fair (2022).
- Born: Miguel Ángel Martín; 1960 (age 65–66) León, Castile and León, Spain
- Areas: Penciller, Inker, Colourist

Miguel Ángel Martín (born 1960 in León) is a Spanish comic author and artist. He won the Best New Artist award at the 1992 Barcelona International Comic Fair. Martín is the author of the controversial comic Psychopathia Sexualis (which was banned in Italy). He has also written many other experimental comics which deal with subjects including dystrophic Cyberpunk scenarios (Cyberfreak etc.) or body horror; his protagonist Brian the Brain for instance features an open skull in which the brain lies visible and unprotected. Other popular publications are Rubber Flesh and Surfing on the Third Wave (publisher: El Víbora).

Besides that Martín has illustrated record covers (Subterfuge Records et al.) and other publications.

== List of works ==
The following list of works is taken from the artists website and does not include works he did for magazines or illustrations.

- Brian the Brain (La Cúpula/El Víbora)
- RubberFlesh (La Cúpula)
- Keibol Black (La Factoría)
- Kyrie Nuevo Europeo (La Factoría)
- The Space Between (La Factoría)
- Anal Core (La Factoría)
- Snuff 2000 (La Factoría)
- Psychopathia Sexualis (La Factoría)
- Big Whack! (La Factoría)
- Crónica Negra (Midons Editorial)
- Días felices (La Factoría)
- Barny (Gryker & Asociados)
- Atolladero-Texas with script from Oscaraibar (Glenat)
- Cyberfreak (Topolin Edizioni)
- Sicotronic Records (Subterfuge)
- HardON (La Factoría)
- NeuroHabitat (La Factoría)
- Play Love (Rey Lear)
- Surfing on the third wave

== Awards ==
- 1992 Revelation Author Award in the International Salon of Comic (Barcelona)
- 1999 Italian International Comics and Cartooning Exhibition; Famous Yellow Kid Award (Roma)
- 2003 Great Award "Attilio Micheluzzi" (Napoli, Comicon)
- 2006 Best European Comic Award Romics (Rome)
- 2007 Best comic of the year award XL - La Repubblica (Comicon, Napoli)
