= Davide Toffolo =

Comic book writer (born 1965)

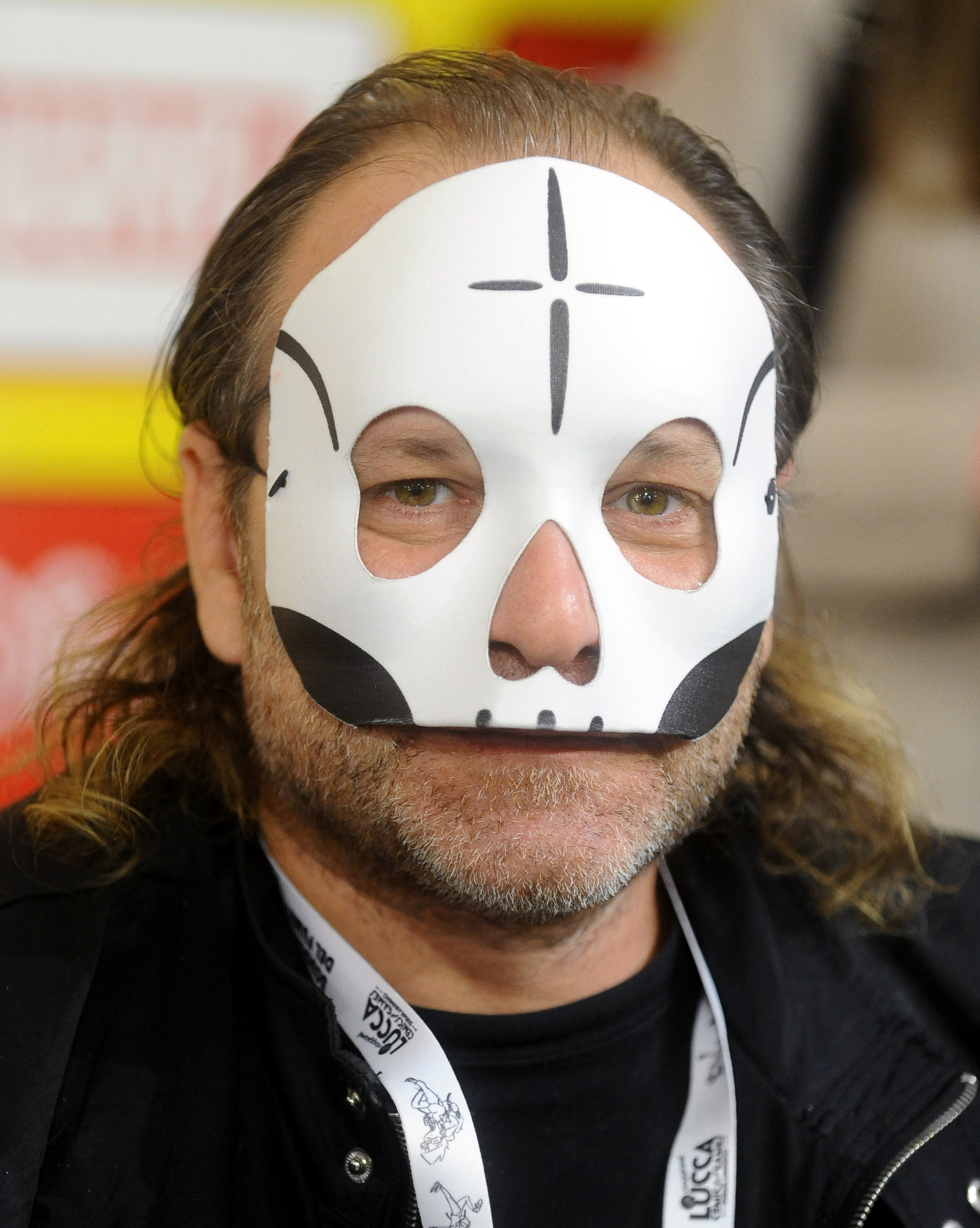
- Davide Toffolo at Lucca Comics & Games 2015
- Born: January 17, 1965 (age 61) Pordenone, Italy
- Areas: Cartoonist, author, musician
- Notable works: Italian winter

Davide Toffolo (born January 17, 1965, Pordenone, Italy) is an Italian author of comics books, including graphic non-fiction works, and musician.

== Life and work ==
Davide Toffolo studied at the DAMS (Dipartimento di Arte, Musica e Spettacolo – In English: Department of Arts, Music and Entertainment) of the University of Bologna.

When Davide Toffolo started to play music, his native town Pordenone was already one of the most important cities for the Italian punk rock scene which emerged in the late 1970s because of the closeness of the American military base in Aviano. Members of his band, Tre Allegri Ragazzi Morti (Three happy dead boys), are known for wearing a skull masks and not letting the fans take pictures or videos without the skull masks.

In 2005 his band together with a few bands from the neighboring Slovenia, which has a similar punk rock tradition from the 1970s, went to an overseas concert tour in South America. It could be assumed that conversing with fellow punk musicians from Slovenia he had heard of the existence of Gonars concentration camp for the first time, and decided to write the non-fiction comic book titled Italian winter about it in 2010. It is based on documents from official archives in Slovenia, collected by Paola Bristot, art historian at University of Bologna.

== Comic books (Italian editions) ==
- Piera degli Spiriti (with Giovanni Mattioli), Kappa Edizioni, 1996
- Animali (with Giovanni Mattioli), Kappa Edizioni, 1998
- Fregoli, Kappa Edizioni, 1998
- Fare Fumetti, Vivacomix, 2000
- Carnera, la montagna che cammina, Vivacomix
- Intervista a Pasolini, Biblioteca dell'immagine, 2002
- Anatomia di una adolescenza, Vivacomix, 2005
- Il re bianco, Coconino Press, 2005
- Très! Fumetti per il teatro, Coconino Press, 2008
- Lezioni di fumetto, Coniglio editore, 2009
- L'inverno d'Italia (in English "Italian winter"), Coconino Press, 2010
- Graphic Novel is Dead, Rizzoli, 2014
- Il cammino della Cumbia, Oblomov Edizioni, 2018
- Graphic Novel is Back, Rizzoli, 2019
- Come rubare un Magnus, Oblomov Edizioni, 2020
- L'ultimo vecchio sulla Terra, Rizzoli, 2021 (with Remo Remotti)

== Comic series ==
- Fandango, Cult Comix, 1999–2001
- Cinque allegri ragazzi morti
