= Franco Saudelli =

Italian comics artist (born 1952)

Franco Saudelli (born 4 August 1952) is an Italian comics artist, mostly known for his erotic stories.

== Biography ==
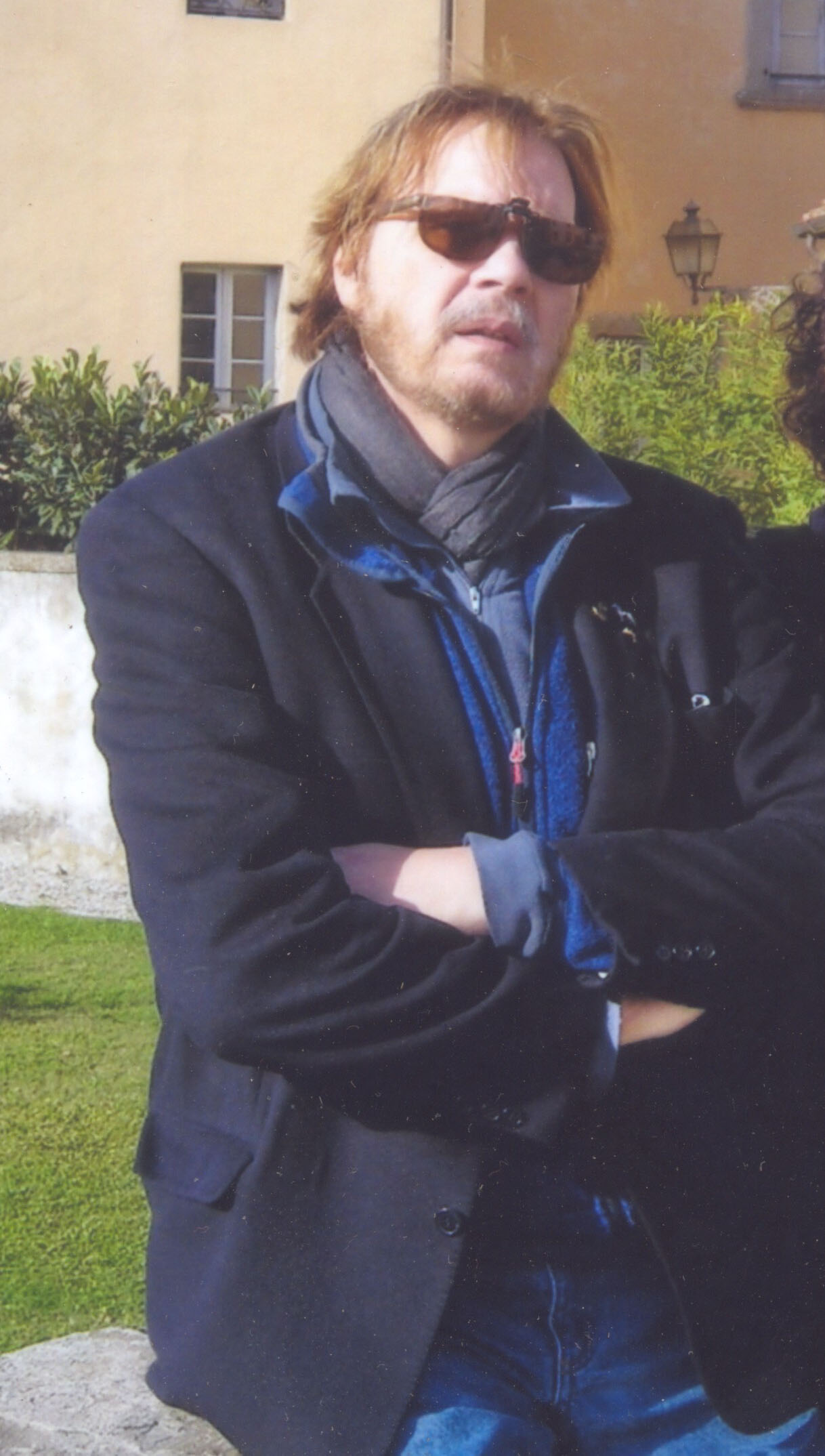
Franco Saudelli

Franco Saudelli was born in Latina (Lazio), but moved soon to Rome.

He made his debut in the comics world in the mid-1970s, first collaborating with Ugolino Cossu and Massimo Rotundo and then, from 1978, with some western stories for the magazine Lanciostory. He was later to work with Roberto Baldazzini, Stefano Piselli and Riccardo Morrocchi creating Baldazzini & Saudelli's Bizarreries: Book one and Book two.

Saudelli's works appeared in several other Italian and French magazines, like Orient Express, Libération and Charlie Mensuel. In the 1980s, he started making short erotic comics for the magazines Comic Art, Glamour and Diva, sometimes in collaboration with Giovanna Casotto. Bondage and barefoot fetish scenes play a big part in the stories, for example in La Bionda, published in album format by Dargaud.
