= Tuono Pettinato =

Italian comics writer and illustrator (1976–2021)

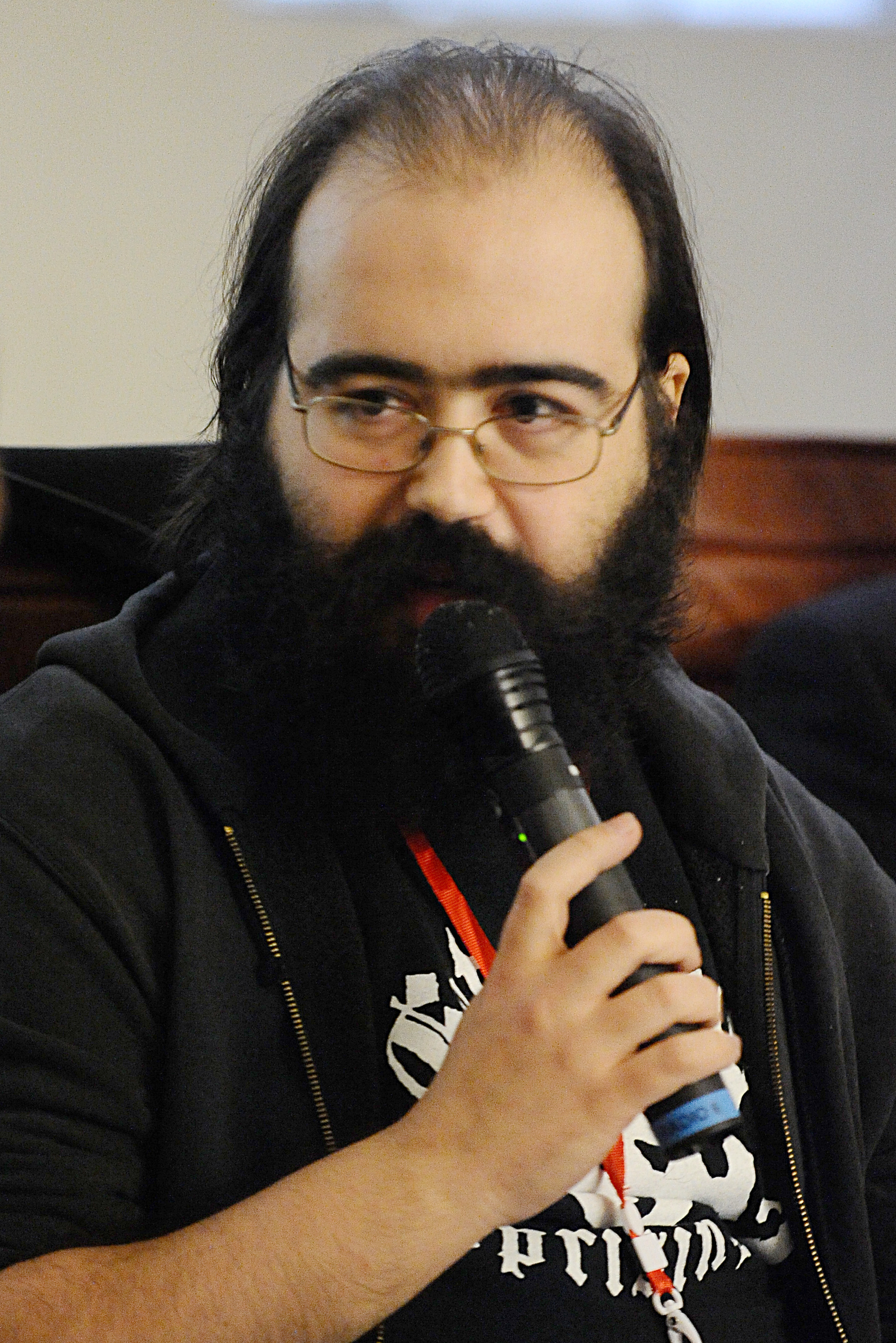
- Pettinato at Lucca Comics & Games in 2012
- Born: Andrea Paggiaro; 12 July 1976; Pisa, Italy
- Died: 14 June 2021 (aged 44); Pisa, Italy
- Occupations: Comics writer Illustrator

Andrea Paggiaro, better known as Tuono Pettinato, (12 July 1976 – 14 June 2021) was an Italian comics writer and illustrator.

== Selected works ==
- Apocalypso! Gli anni dozzinali, Coniglio Editore, 2010
- Garibaldi. Resoconto veritiero delle sue valorose imprese, ad uso delle giovani menti, Rizzoli Lizard, 2010
- Il magnifico lavativo, TopiPittori, 2011
- Enigma. La strana vita di Alan Turing, with Francesca Riccioni, Rizzoli Lizard, 2012
- Corpicino, GRRRzetic, 2013
- Nevermind, Rizzoli Lizard, 2014
- OraMai, COMICS & SCIENCE @CERN, CNR Edizioni, 2014
- We are the champions, with Dario Moccia, Rizzoli Lizard, 2016
- Big in Japan, with Dario Moccia, Rizzoli Lizard, 2018
