= Sio (cartoonist) =

Italian cartoonist and blogger (born 1988)

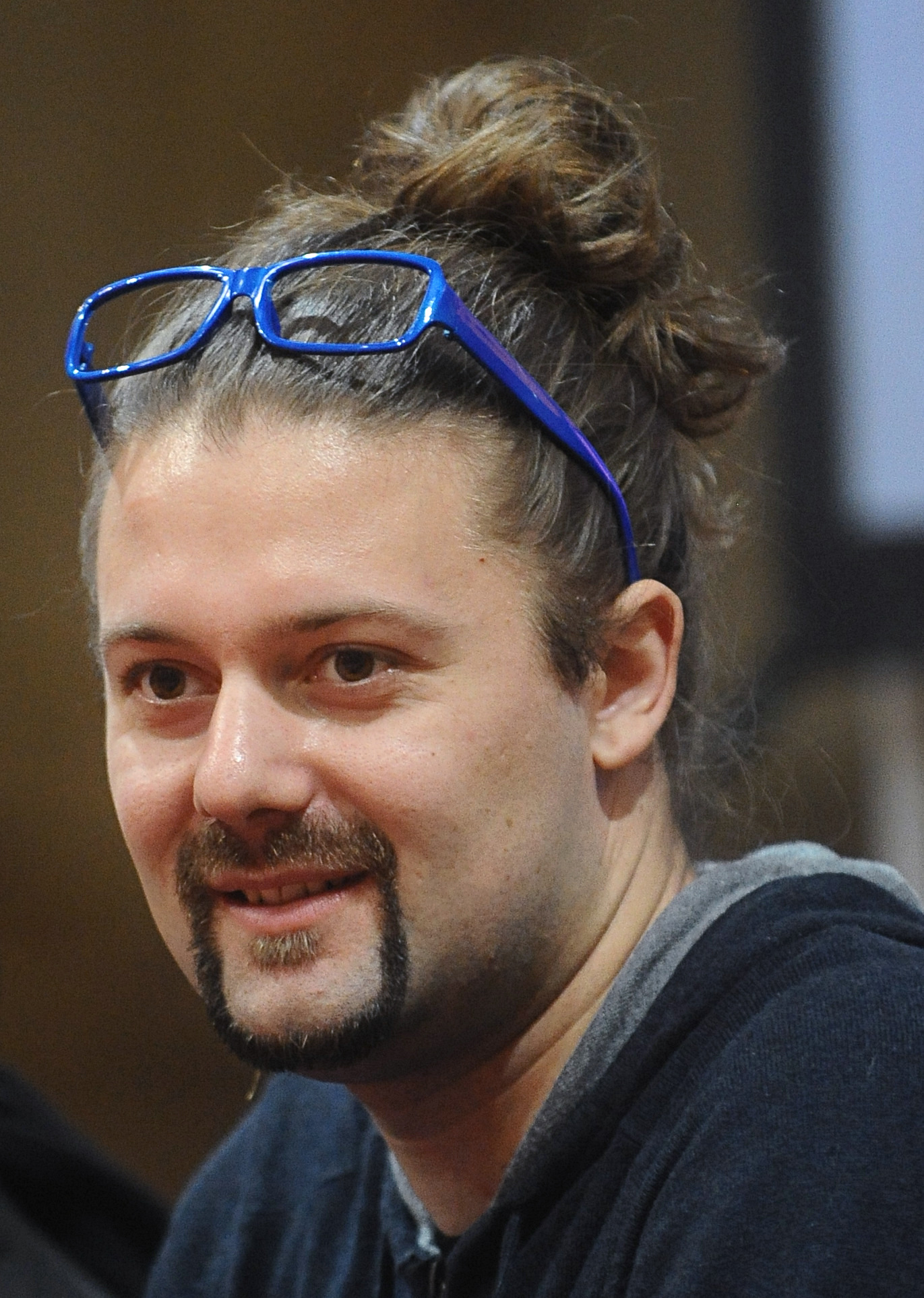
- Sio at Lucca Comics & Games in 2015
- Born: Simone Albrigi; 8 October 1988 (age 37); Verona, Italy
- Education: Ca' Foscari University of Venice
- Occupation: Cartoonist
- Children: 2

YouTube information
- Channel: Scottecs
- Years active: 2006–present
- Genres: Comedy; animation; cartoon
- Subscribers: 2.48 million
- Views: 727 million
- Last updated: 21 June 2026

Simone Albrigi (Italian pronunciation: [siˈmoːne alˈbriːdʒi]; born 8 October 1988), better known under the pseudonym Sio (pronounced [ˈsiːo]), is an Italian comics artist and YouTuber. Sio's YouTube channel Scottecs is one of the most popular in Italy.

Sio became a father in 2019.
