= Gipi =

Italian cartoonist, filmmaker, and author (pen name of Gianni Pacinotti)

Gianni Pacinotti
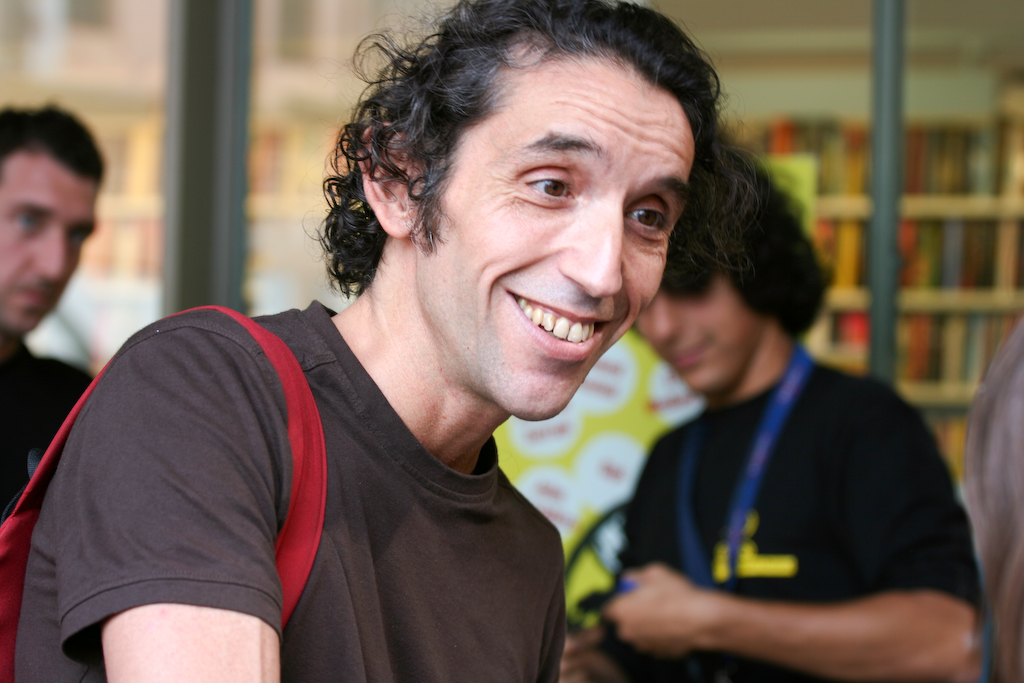
- Born: December 12, 1963 (age 62) Pisa
- Areas: Comics artist, cartoonist, filmmaker, author
- Pseudonym: Gipi
- Awards: Goscinny Prize (2005); Max & Moritz Prize (2006); Angoulême International Comics Festival Prize for Best Album (2006); Inkpot Award (2008); U Giancu's Prize (2014)

Gian Alfonso Pacinotti, better known by the pseudonym of Gipi, is an Italian cartoonist, filmmaker, and author.

== Biography ==
Born in Pisa in 1963, he began his career illustrating for the publishing and advertising industries.

He began illustrating stories and comics in 1992, and his work appeared in Cuore, Blue, Il Clandestino, Boxer, Il Manifesto and Lo Straniero. His work also appears in La Repubblica.

His graphic novel Appunti per una storia di guerra (Notes for a War Story), published by Coconino Press, appeared in France and was published in the United States by First Second Books. It won the 2005 Goscinny Prize for Best Script and was proclaimed Best Book at Angoulême in 2006. Notes for a War Story follows three young men in a war-torn country –intended to be any number of European countries. "In the Italian version of the book", Gipi has remarked, "the name of the villages are Italian names, in the French version, French names. I didn't want the reader to think, ‘This war happens elsewhere, far from me.’ My intention was to make people think about the possibilities of a war suddenly arriving in their own home".

Gipi has created Gli innocenti (The Innocents) for the Ignatz Series and in 2006 this work earned him an Eisner Award nomination and a Max & Moritz Prize. The Innocents is about a reformed thug who takes his young nephew down to the seaside, where they visit an old friend who has just been released out of prison for a crime he did not commit.

== Other work ==
In 2000, he founded Santa Maria Video. Santa Maria is a studio through which he creates video and animation shorts. His debut as a film director, The Last Earthling, premiered at the 68th Venice International Film Festival.

In 2015, he successfully crowdfunded and launched Bruti, a card game about melee combats between warriors and enchanters set in a dark fantasy with a medieval feel. Gipi designed the game and illustrated each card. The deluxe version of the rulebook includes a long introductory comic.

In 2025, La nave di Teseo published Gipi's first prose novel, ''Zaky e gli altri''.

== Works ==
=== Graphic novels ===
- Esterno notte (in Italian). Bologna: Coconino Press. 2003
- Garage Band. New York: First Second Books. 2005.
- S (in Italian). Bologna: Coconino Press. 2006
- Notes for a War Story. New York: First Second Books. 2007 [2004].
- Land of the Sons. Seattle: Fantagraphics Books. 2018 [2016]. ISBN 9781683960775.
- Momenti straordinari con applausi finti (in Italian). Bologna: Coconino Press. 2019. ISBN 8876185232
- One Story. Seattle: Fantagraphics Books. 2020 [2013].
- MBDL - My Badly Drawn Life. Seattle: Fantagraphics Books. 2022 [2008]. ISBN 9781683965213.

=== Anthologies ===
- The Innocents. Wish You Were Here. Vol. 1. Seattle: Fantagraphics Books. 2005. ISBN 9781560977575.
- They Found the Car. Wish You Were Here. Vol. 2. Seattle: Fantagraphic Books. 2006. ISBN 9781560978015.
- Diario di fiume e altre storie (in Italian). Bologna: Coconino Press. 2009
- Verticali (in Italian). Bologna: Coconino Press. 2009
- Baci dalla provincia (in Italian). Bologna: Coconino Press. 2011

== Filmography ==
Year	Title	Director	Screenwriter	Actor	Adaptation	Notes
2011	The Last Man on Earth	Yes	Yes		Yes	Adapted from Giacomo Monti's comic Nessuno mi farà del male
2012	Smettere di fumare fumando	Yes	Yes	Yes		Also producer
2018	The Happiest Man in the World	Yes	Yes	Yes		
2021	La terra dei figli				Yes	Adapted from Gipi's comic Land of the Sons
2023	Severodonetsk	Yes				Music video from Manuel Agnelli's song of the same name
