= Tiziano Sclavi =

Italian writer

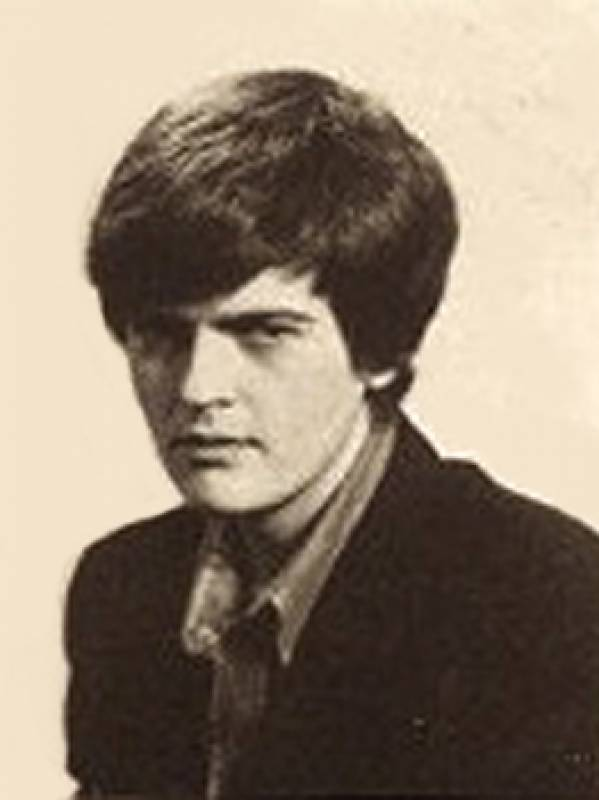
- Born: 3 April 1953 (age 73) Broni, Italy
- Area: Writer
- Notable works: Dylan Dog, Dellamorte Dellamore
- Awards: U Giancu's Prize, 2000

Tiziano Sclavi (born 3 April 1953) is an Italian comic book author, journalist and writer of several novels. Sclavi is most famous as creator of the comic book Dylan Dog in 1986, for Italian publishing house Sergio Bonelli Editore. More than 300 issues have appeared in the series, which has sold millions of copies. It has been in collaboration with several artists, including Claudio Villa, Corrado Roi, Gustavo Trigo, Carlo Ambrosini, Luigi Piccatto, Angelo Stano, Mike Mignola, Andrea Venturi, Giampiero Casertano and Bruno Brindisi.

== Biography ==
Tiziano Sclavi was born in Broni (Pavia) on 3 April 1953, his mother was a teacher and his father was a communal secretary. He had lived his childhood and first youth in the Province of Pavia, mainly in Stradella, Canneto Pavese and Certosa di Pavia. Due to the job of the father, Sclavi had moved from a town to another:

I had grown up in a little town where everyone stopped to see a car when it was moving into the street, because nothing had ever happened. I'd lived in a little town until I was fourteen years old [...] when cars passed they stopped! People stopped and all younglings saw cars: the “1100s”, that is, an 1100 was passing by [...]! And then it scares me, that repetition too, that... I don't know, my father was an employee, he was a communal secretary... Bureaucracy also scares me, repetition of things scares me, the boredom, the non-sense, then actually there are much more stuffs! Ignorances scares me more than the unknown! But, ok, this have been said by others a lot of time ago before me, much better!

Sclavi has been a passionate reader since childhood: he claims he read the entire production of Edgar Allan Poe when he was between six and seven years old, and he has liked scary stories since his childhood, developing a passion of horror and science fiction films.

He started to write when he was still too young pushed by the desire to imitate what he enjoyed. He declared:

I liked western films and I wrote a western "novel" when I was in the second year of middle school. Then I was a fanatic of 007, I'd read all the works of Fleming and I wanted more of them, so I wrote one on my own.

At middle school, he won a writing competition with a series entitled Storie Storte ("Crooked Stories"). Then, he attended the liceo classico of Pavia, when he published a story entitled Lettere bianche ("White Letters") on a school journal with the help of his Italian literature professor who believed into the ability and creativity of Sclavi.

=== Seventies ===
After high school, Sclavi attended university at the faculty of modern literature, but dropped out after a few exams. Later, he had moved to Milan.

In 1971, thanks to the interest of Grazia Nidasio who presented him to Mino Milani, Sclavi began to collaborate with the Messaggero dei Ragazzi, where he wrote articles and stories often under the pseudonym "Francesco Argento", in honour to Francesco Guccini and Dario Argento, who both would be his colleagues at Corriere dei Piccoli.

In 1972, Sclavi met Raffaele Crovi, who would be initially his literary agent and then editor of his novels and stories. In 1973, Sclavi issued a series of crime stories on Il Corriere dei Ragazzi under the pseudonym of Francesco Argento. The stories he wrote for Corriere dei Piccoli were collected in the volume I misteri di Mystère ("Mystère's Mysteries") by Editore Bietti in 1974 (then published by Arnoldo Mondadori Editore). These stories are focused on the character of Jacques Mystère, whose name inspired the creation of Martin Mystère by Alfredo Castelli in 1982.

In 1974, Sclavi published his first short novel, Film, where he tries to unite the horror splatter and the grotesque. It was issued by Il Formichiere and it won the 1974 Scanno Prize for storytelling. However, Film seems to be a work "which can not be easily collocated in a genre or a novel movement, and it is even [...] difficult to limit it in the category itself of the novel". In the same year, he joined the redaction of Corriere dei Ragazzi as editor of the column Sottosopra and here he met Alfredo Castelli, with whom he collaborated as Ghost Writer for the comic series Gli Aristocratici ("The Aristocrats"), writing the screenplay of some episodes and later creating his own characters like Altai & Jonson drawn by Giorgio Cavazzano. In the preface of the 2001 new edition of the first series of Sclavi, Castelli writes:

I met Tiziano Sclavi at the beginning of the seventies, when he was very young and began to take part to comic art exhibitions… His skills were amazing.

At the same time, he worked at the national broadcaster RAI thanks to the mediation of Crovi and, together with Bianca Pitzorno, he wrote texts of the show Gioco-città. He collaborated with other newspapers belonging to the Corriere della sera group and with the journal Amica (where he edited a humour column) and with Salve (where he wrote as film critic).

As Francesco Argento, Sclavi published in 1975 a crime novel entitled Un sogno di sangue ("A dream of blood"). During the same period, he wrote also Tre ("Three") and Mostri ("Monsters"), published ten years later despite Natalia Ginzburg had already noticed him to the Giulio Einaudi Editore.

In 1976, he began his professional career as journalist.

When Corriere dei Ragazzi was closed in 1977, Sclavi began to collaborate with Il Corriere dei Piccoli, writing comic series like Allister, Miki, Fantòm alongside Sam Peck, Johnny Bassotto ("Dachshund Johnny"), Il Cavallino Michele ("Michele the Little Horse"), La guerra nell'aria ("The War in the Air") and Le pagine della Befana ("Befana's pages"). He published on Messaggero dei Ragazzi the western series Silas Finn, drawn by Cavazzano, which would be later issued also in West Germany; he published Devoluzione ("De-evolution") for Alter and he wrote Steve Vandam for the RAI programme SuperGulp!. In 1978, Sclavi published the first version of Apocalisse, formerly entitled Guerre terrestri ("Terrestrial Wars"), issued by Rusconi.

=== Eighties ===
When Corriere della Sera was acquired by Rizzoli Editore, Sclavi proposed himself to Bonelli as editor and he was hired in 1981 as proofreader and writer of series like Zagor, Mister No and Ken Parker, creating also his own characters. Among his first works, he had written screenplays for Ken Parker (the issue #35 Il sentiero dei giganti and #41 Alcune signore di piccola virtù, both based on scripts by Giancarlo Berardi) and then Sclavi had replaced Guido Nolitta for Zagor. The positive response of first issues of Sclavi convinced the publishing house to give him the role of screenwriter for the important issue #200 of the series, becoming then its editor and writing its stories until 1988. Sclavi returned to write for Zagor on the 1990 special spin-off dedicated to Cico, the Mexican sidekick of Zagor, entitled Horror Cico. Since 1982, he had written also screenplays for Mister No, with a little contamination of the horror genre.

In 1984 Bonelli proposed to him the direction of Bonelli-Dargaud (a joint-venutre between Bonelli and the French publisher Dargaud). Together with Federico Maggioni as Art Director, he directs the Italian edition of the French comic magazine Pilote for Bonelli-Dargaud, intended to be published alongside the adult oriented and prestigious Orient Express, acquired by Bonelli in 1984 The Italian Pilot offered both authorial and traditional comics from Italian and French authors, but it was closed together with Orient Express in 1985 with the issue #15. Following these flops, Bonelli decided to return to work on traditional comics.

==== Creating Dylan Dog ====
Cover of Dylan Dog 62, 1996.

The first character created by Sclavi in Bonelli was Kerry Scott of the 1983 series Kerry il trapper ("Kerry the trapper"), a western comic series with horror influences published as appendix to Comandante Mark ("Commander Mark") until 1985. According to some critics, Kerry represented a former test for the further creation of Dylan Dog because Sclavi experimented and tried to insert elements taken from the horror genre. Initially, the story of Dylan Dog was placed in America and inspired to the hard boiled genre, where Dylan was a lonely detective, without a sidekick. It was later propose to place the story in London after a discussion with Bonelli, because in New York there was Martin Mystère already and England seemed to be more ideal for horror due to its ancient traditions. Meanwhile, the figure of Groucho was included in order to avoid a series more focused on investigations. The creation of the character began a year before when Sergio Bonelli, owner of the publishing house, and Decio Canzio, general director, preferred to return to work on traditional comics and eventually to create new ones. Sclavi proposed a horror series, temporarily called Dylan Dog. The protagonist was graphically realized by Claudio Villa who drew him with the appearance of English actor Rupert Everett. Sclavi tells:

When I invented Dylan Dog, we called a comic artist who was Claudio Villa, and we told him "do some sketches". And he drew a character who seemed a Spanish, a Spanish dancer […] And I said: "No, that's not good enough, that's not good enough" [...] Then i thought, I told him: "Look, last evening I saw a film, Another Country. […] Go, go to the cinema, […] watch the film and draw that kind of face, that I think it's an interesting face." He went to the cinema, […] he drew Rupert Everett in the darkness. […] I told him: "Don't make him so effeminate: a little more "macho". However, the equivocation and ambiguity of Rupert Everett are entirely present in Dylan Dog.

The series debuted in October 1986 and Decio Canzio, editor in chief of the series at the time, remembers that:

A few days later, the distributor called us and said "The comic book is dead in newsagents, a flop". The horrible news was pitfully hidden to Sclavi. A few weeks later, there was another call of the distributor "It's a boom, practically sold out, maybe we should reprint it."

After a few years, Dylan Dog became a best seller: the first Horror Fest convention of horror cinema was organized in 1987 in honour to the success of Dylan Dog, and in 1990 Sclavi won the Yellow Kid prize as best author. In 1990, Sclavi published on Comic Art a collection of three short stories in colour about Dylan Dog (L'inquilino del terzo piano, L'appartamento n.13 and L'incubo è finito), drawn by Corrado Roi, and published a year later in the volume Gli Inquilini Arcani. In 1991, the issue #69 sold more than Tex, school diaries were made and the first Horror Fest convention was organized. The novel Dellamorte Dellamore had a wide success and in 1994 Michele Soavi directed a film based on it (distributed in the US with the title Cemetery Man) starring Rupert Everett, the actor who inspired the somatic traits of Dylan Dog.

Meanwhile, Sclavi crossed a creative and personal crisis which took him away from the character. The signature of Sclavi appeared less and less until it disappears after the issue #100, La storia di Dylan Dog ("The History of Dylan Dog"), where Sclavi tried to end the storyline of Xabaras. From this point, stories signed by Sclavi had lost their splatter feature of the first issues and they began to focus more on the surreal and grotesque, with incursions in social and science-fiction themes.

During the eighties and nineties, aside his main activity for Bonelli, he collaborated with other publishing houses: between 1982 and 1984, he wrote Agente Allen ("Agent Allen") and Vita da cani ("A Dog's Life") for Il Giornalino, and, from 1987 to 1991, Sclavi published on Comic Art three stories of the Roy Mann series drawn by Attilio Micheluzzi and in which he tells the adventures of a comic screenwriter who, due to the explosion of a coffee-pot, is catapulted in a parallel universe. Some characteristics similar to those of Dylan Dog and in some novels of Sclavi can be found in Roy Mann, but with more influences of humour, fantasy and paradoxical elements.

=== Nineties ===
In 1993 the book Nel buio ("In the darkness") was published a collection of ballads in the style of Francesco Guccini, Fabrizio De André and Claudio Lolli: these are not poems as evidenced by Slcavi himself, but compositions born to be set to music. Some of them, I miei sette figli ("My seven sons") and Sotto il segno della volpe ("Under the sign of the fox"), have become songs sung by Tiziano Cantatore in the album È sparita l'orsa maggiore (Eleven, Fonit Cetra, 1978).

Since this moment, he had stopped to write novels until the second half of the nineties, when he published Le etichette delle camicie (1996) and Non è successo niente (1998). The publication of Dellamorte Dellamore in 1991 gave to Sclavi the success as narrator. The novel was created some years before and the original manuscript was lost, but Sclavi reused the main character, Francesco Dellamorte, for a story with Dylan Dog, making him as his alter ego; the novel was then found and published. The character of Dellamorte represented for Sclavi a general test for Dylan Dog because he confronts a horde of zombies along with a grotesque sidekick, Gnaghi, and he builds a scale model as hobby. The success in the nineties led him to re-publish Nero ("Black"), Apocalisse ("Apocalipse"), Mostri ("Monsters") and La circolazione del sangue ("Blood circulation"), all works written years before which were published due to the success of Scalvi as comic writer. Hencefore, Sclavi began to write novels in 1995. In 1997, the full version of Tre was published and Natalia Ginzburg, after reading that version, called Sclavi to tell him her appreciation.

In 1998, the novel Non è successo niente ("Nothing has happened") was published and it has been considered as the last novel by the author, because he had declared that he had nothing more to tell. It is an autobiographical novel where Sclavi tells about himself through three characters: Tiz, successful screenwriter, Tom, a depressed alcoholic in a creative crisis and with suicidal temptations, and Cohan, who represents Sclavi at the time and has reached an equilibrium and an affective serenity, but he has lost his creative vein; other numerous characters around the main ones can be reconducted to colleagues in Bonelli with a representation of life in the redaction. In a 1999 interview for Il Mattino, Sclavi stated that:

In this period, I don't write crosswords too. I have the so called writer's block, both for novels and comics

Sclavi announced so his will to not write novels also due to the poor result of selling of his last work.

Sclavi wrote also for the publishing house for children La Coccinella and in 1999 he took part to the realization of the video-game Dylan Dog Horror Luna Park.

=== New millennium ===
In the 2000s, Sclavi remained as supervisor of the series of Dylan Dog, leaving the role of screenwriter.

In 2005, Sclavi gave more than 8 000 volumes to the Communal Library of Venegono Superiore, collected and preserved in the Fondo Sclavi which collects volumes about cinema, music, a wide collection of comics and books about comics, novels of various genres (crime, noir and science-fiction), studies on occultism and paranormal phenomena, photographic volumes and books about graphic.

In 2006, Sclavi wrote a story for a Dylan Dog issue published in 2006 and he published a new novel, Il tornado di Valle Scuropasso ("The tornado of Scuropasso Valley") for Mondadori.

In 2016 he wrote a story for the issue #362 of Dylan Dog in occasion of its 30th anniversary, and one other for the issue #375 published in 2017.

== CICAP member ==
Sclavi is a member of CICAP (Comitato Italiano per il Controllo delle Affermazioni sul Paranormale, Italian Committee for the Investigation of Claims of the Pseudosciences). In some interviews, he stated that

The occult, the mysterious and the demoniac fit perfectly in works of fantasy, but reality is another thing. In the series, I've inserted a character, professor Adam, who's more or less a symbol of CICAP. [...] If I have to make an exception, I do it for UFOs: I don't believe in their existence, but I hope so. All the rest is acceptable in invented stories, absolutely not if it serves to take money from people, as in the case of pay "magicians", of the "healers".

== Films based upon his works ==
Some works of Sclavi had been transposed to cinema: Nero.(1992), directed by Giancarlo Soldi, Dellamorte Dellamore (1993), directed by Michele Soavi starring Rupert Everett, and Dylan Dog: Dead of Night (2011), directed by Kevin Munroe starring Brandon Routh. About Dellamorte Dellamore, Sclavi had stated:

I think that this film is a little jewel of black and grotesque humor. I can say so with certainty, given that I'd only sold the rights and I did nothing. The screenplay was written by Michele Soavi himself and Giovanni Romoli. When I read it, I called Michele with great enthusiasm: it was even better than my book! In another case, the one of “Nero.” (with the full stop, notice that), a film directed by Giancarlo Soldi, I had written personally the screenplay (that I had later transformed in a novel), and then I can't make any judgement.

== Accolades ==
- 1974 - Scanno prize for storytelling for Film
- 1987 and 1990 - ANAF Prize as best writer
- 1990 - Yellow Kid as best author (during the Salone Internazionale dei Comics of Lucca)
- 1992 - "Giallo dell'Anno" Prize during the Festival in Noir of Viareggio, for Sogni di sangue
- 2006 - Gran Guinigi Prize as best author (during Lucca Comics & Games)

== Works ==
=== Comics ===
==== Dylan Dog ====
- Dylan Dog issues #1-23, #25-26, #28, #30-33, #40-43, #46, #50-52, #56-57, #59, #61-65, #67, #69, #72, #74-77, #80-81, #83-84, #88, #100, #109, #113, #117, #119-121, #123, #125, #127, #129, #131, #133-134, #136, #138, #140, #143, #145-146, #151, #153, #156, #161, #163, #173, #176, #240, #243-244, #250, #362, #375 (1986-2001, 2006-2007 and 2016–2017)
- Dylan Dog Speciale issues #1-7 (1987-1993)
- Dylan Dog & Martin Mystère issues #1-2 (1990 and 1992)
- Dylan Dog: Almanacco della paura issues #1-4 (1991-1994)
- Dylan Dog Gigante issues #1-2 and #4-8 (1993-1999)
- Maxi Dylan Dog issue #2 (1999)
- Dylan Dog – Viaggio nell’incubo (vol. 1/50), La Gazzetta dello Sport – Corriere della Sera, 2019

==== Zagor ====
- Zagor issues #184-186, #191-203, #221-222, #275-280 (1980-1983, 1988)

==== Mister No ====
- Mister No issues #90-92, #97-98, #104-108, #138-139, #159-161 (1982-1984, 1986, 1988)

==== Others ====
- Gli aristocratici (1974)
- Altai & Jonson (1975-1976, 1978–1979, 1985)
- Archivio Zero (1975-1977)
- Jonny bassotto (1977)
- Il cavallino Michele (1977)
- Fantom (1977-1978)
- John John va nel West (1977-1978)
- Sam Peck esploratore solitario (1977-1978)
- Le avventure del professor Strano (1977-1978)
- Bizarro (1977-1978)
- Silas Finn (1978)
- Devoluzione (1978)
- Steve Vandam (1978)
- Ken Parker numbers 35 and 41 (1980-1981)
- Agente Allen (1982)
- Vita da cani (1982)
- Kerry il trapper (1983)
- Martin Mystère issues #51-52 (1986)
- Roy Mann (1987-1991), Comic Art, 1993
- Cico Speciale number 6 (1990)
- La banconota da un milione di sterline (1990, adaptation of the homonymous novel of Mark Twain)
- Il West di Silas Finn (1992)
- John Merrick – Medico chirurgo del London Hospital sotto Vittoria Regina (1993)
- Le voci dell'acqua (2019)

=== Novels ===
==== Narrative ====
- I misteri di Mystère (1973)
- Film (1974)
- Guerre terrestri (1978)
- Le etichette delle camicie (1996)
- Il tornado di valle Scuropasso (2006)

==== Gothic stories ====
- Un sogno di sangue (1975)
- Apocalisse (1978); definitive version of Guerre terrestri, it was reprinted in 1992 as Il nemico and divided in episodes for Il Corriere della Sera
- Tre (1988)
- Dellamorte Dellamore (1991)
- Nero. (1991)
- Sogni di sangue (1992)
- Mostri (1994)
- La circolazione del sangue (1995)
- Non è successo niente (1998)

==== For children ====
- Nella foresta (1980)
- Dove vai uccellino? (1982)
- Casa mia, casa mia (1986)
- Guarda di là (1993)
- Metti il dito (1993)
- Scopri cos'è (1993)
- Tocca qui (1993)
- I sette cammellieri (1994)
- Una cosa cos'è (1997)
- Buchi nell'acqua
- Con tutto il cuore

=== Screenwriter ===
- Nero. (1992)

=== Collections of lyrics of songs ===
- Nel Buio, canzoni e ballate di morte e d'amore (1993)
