= Valentina Romeo =

Italian artist and billiards player

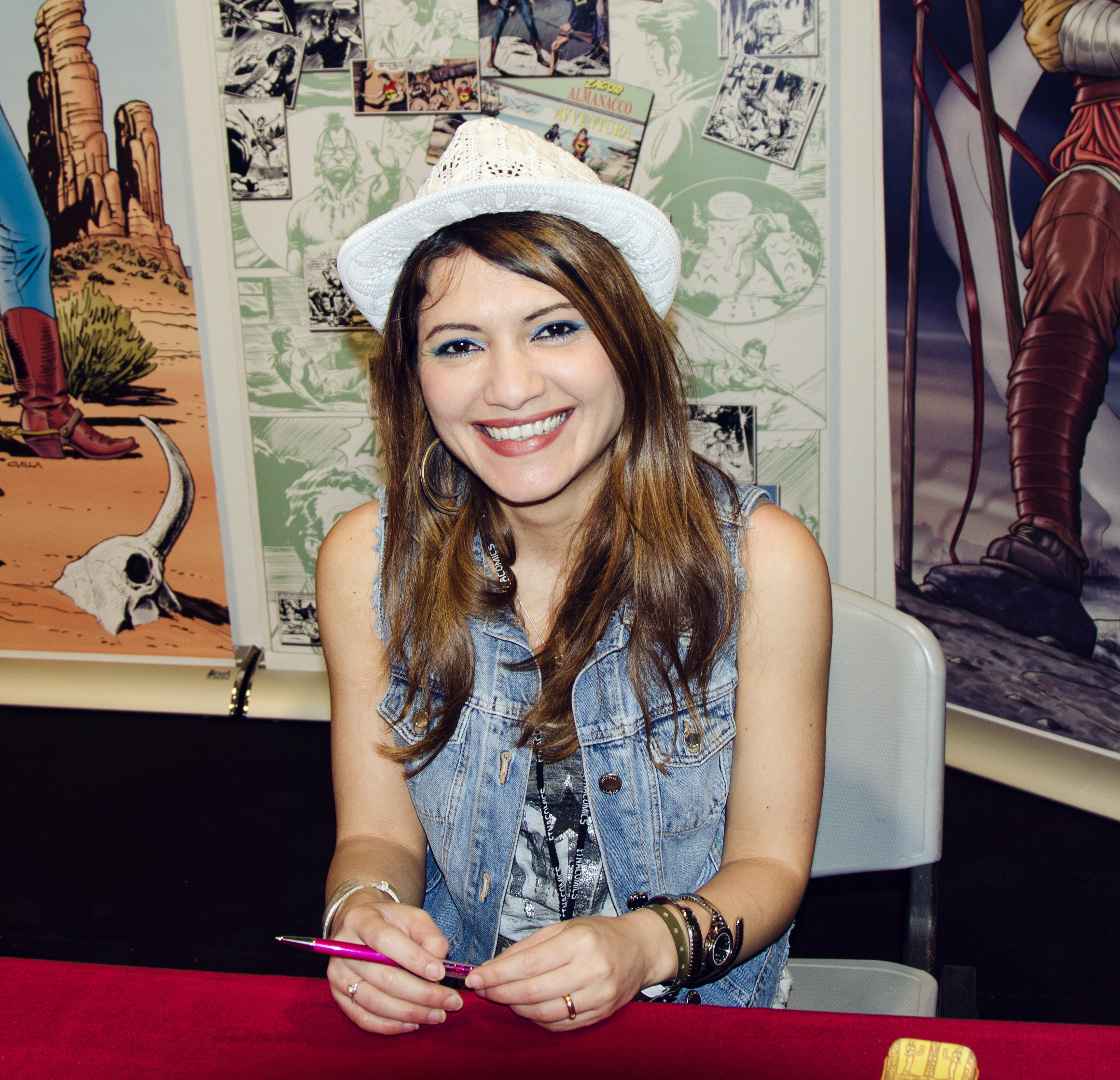
- Valentina Romeo (2015)
- Born: 30 October 1977 (age 49) Messina, Italy
- Areas: cartoonist; draughtswoman; illustrator; billiards player
- Pseudonym: Val Romeo
- Notable works: Jonathan Steele; Dylan Dog; Morgan Lost; Nathan Never

Valentina Romeo (also known by the diminutive, Val Romeo; Messina, 30 October 1977) is an Italian cartoonist, illustrator, and billiards player.

== Biography ==
She attended the Scuola Italiana di Comix in Naples, where she later worked as an illustrator on some projects for school publishing. In 2006, she began her collaboration for Jonathan Steele (Star Comics version), joining the staff of Federico Memola's character.

Romeo is also a billiards champion, winning the Italian women's title and the first European medal in the Italian women's pool for both individual and team. She has been a member of the Italian national pool team for about 10 years.

In 2007, Romeo drew a colour comics strip story on the life of Saint Giuseppe Moscati, published in No. 57 of Net magazine. In 2009, again for Star Comics, she produced two albums of the limited comics series Rourke, created by Memola.

In August 2010, she made her debut at Sergio Bonelli Editore on the pages of issue 231 of Nathan Never, and in 2011, she collaborated on the creation of Dylan Dog Color Fest no. 6, illustrating the story entitled Tagli aziendali, collaborating with Chiara Caccivio and Ketty Formaggio. Meanwhile, Romeo also participated in a project created by Corriere del Mezzogiorno, Scuola Comix and Napoli Comicon, called Nero Napoletano.

On 15 March 2012, she collaborated with Paola Barbato and Matteo Bussola by drawing episode no. 34 of the webcomic Davvero. In the same year, issues 254 and 258 of Nathan Never, drawn by Romeo, were published. In 2013, she returned to the Dylan Dog Gigante series with the story "La neighbor di casa", with the texts by Pasquale Ruju. Romeo joins the staff of Morgan Lost, a comic series by Claudio Chiaverotti, drawing two issues in 2016: number 4, entitled "La rosa near", and number 12, "Killer Clown".

== Selected works ==
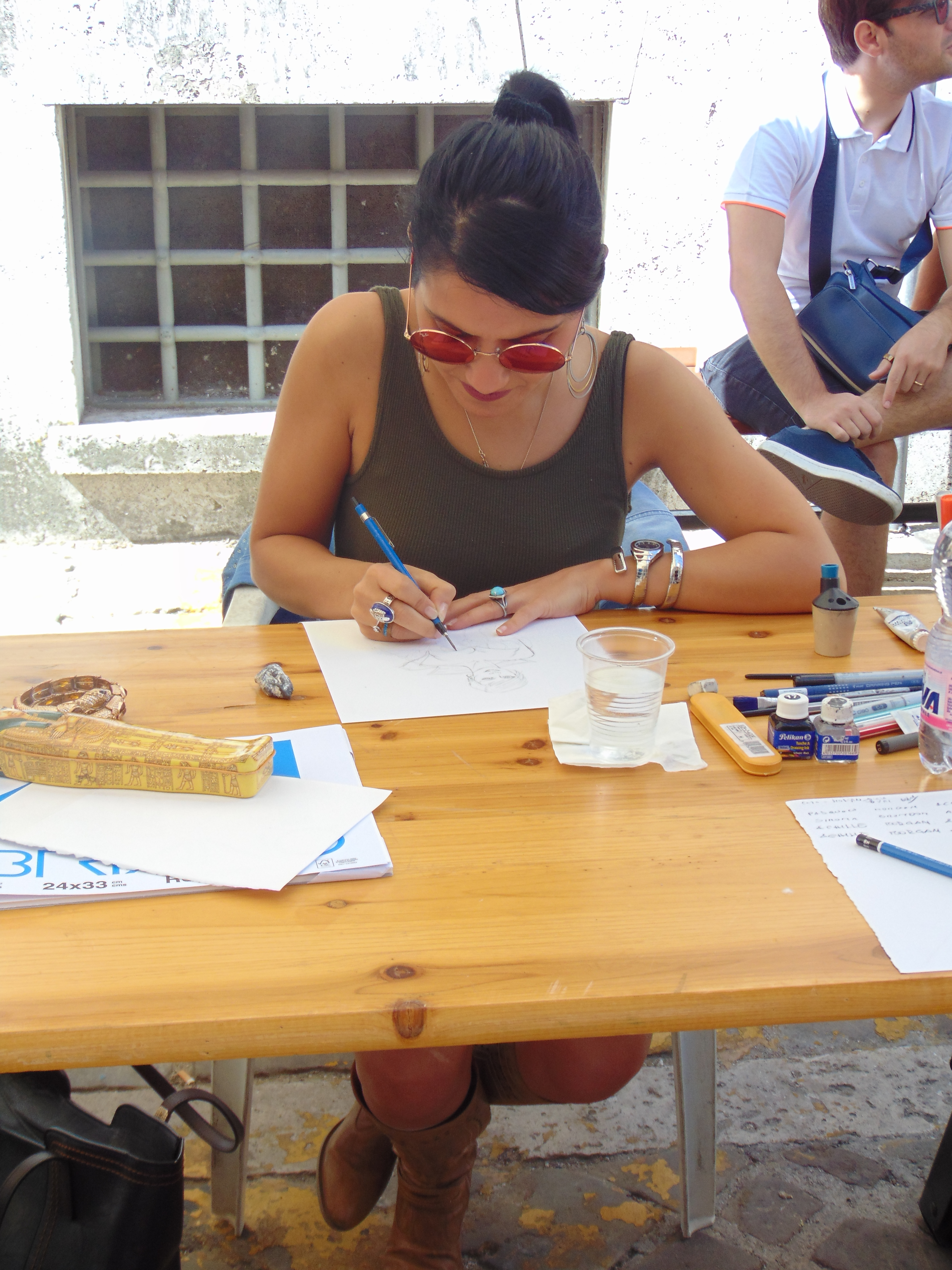
Val Romeo (2019)

=== Dylan Dog ===
- Chiara Caccivio (text), Valentina Romeo (drawings); "Tagli aziendali", in Dylan Dog Color Fest, no. 6, Sergio Bonelli Editore, May 2011.
- Pasquale Ruju (text), Val Romeo (drawings); "La vicina di casa", in Dylan Dog Gigante, no. 22, Sergio Bonelli Editore, November 2013.
- Giovanni Gualdoni (text), Val Romeo (drawings); "Romeo e Giulietta devono morire", in Maxi Dylan Dog, no. 28, Sergio Bonelli Editore, October 2016.

=== Morgan Lost ===
- Claudio Chiaverotti (text), Val Romeo (drawings); "La rosa nera", in Morgan Lost, no. 4, Sergio Bonelli Editore, January 2016.
- Claudio Chiaverotti (text), Val Romeo (drawings); "Killer clown", in Morgan Lost, no. 12, Sergio Bonelli Editore, September 2016.
- Claudio Chiaverotti (text), Val Romeo (drawings); "Le lacrime del diavolo", in Morgan Lost, no. 18, Sergio Bonelli Editore, March 2017.
- Claudio Chiaverotti (text), Val Romeo (drawings); "Origini", in Morgan Lost Dark Novels, no. 0, Sergio Bonelli Editore, November 2017.
- Claudio Chiaverotti (text), Val Romeo (drawings); "Il signore della morte", in Morgan Lost Dark Novels, no. 2, Sergio Bonelli Editore, January 2018.
- Claudio Chiaverotti (text), Val Romeo (drawings); "L'uomo che uccise Anna Freud", in Morgan Lost Dark Novels, no. 6, Sergio Bonelli Editore, May 2018.
- Claudio Chiaverotti & Roberto Recchioni (text), Val Romeo (drawings); "Incubi e serial killer", in Morgan Lost & Dylan Dog, no. 1, Sergio Bonelli Editore, December 2018.
- Claudio Chiaverotti & Roberto Recchioni (text), Val Romeo (drawings); "Londra in rosso e grigio", in Morgan Lost & Dylan Dog, no. 2, Sergio Bonelli Editore, January 2019.
- Claudio Chiaverotti (text), Val Romeo (drawings); "Le storie che non vogliono finire", in Morgan Lost – Black Novels, no. 6, Sergio Bonelli Editore, July 2019.
- Claudio Chiaverotti (text), Val Romeo (drawings); "Bloody Bunny", in Morgan Lost – Night Novels, no. 2, Sergio Bonelli Editore, January 2020.
- Claudio Chiaverotti (text), Val Romeo (drawings); "Il ritorno di Anja", in Morgan Lost – Night Novels, no. 5, Sergio Bonelli Editore, April 2020.
- Claudio Chiaverotti (text), Val Romeo, Giovanni Talami, & Matteo Mosca (drawings); "La mente di ghiaccio", in Morgan Lost – Night Novels, no. 8, Sergio Bonelli Editore, July 2020.

=== Nathan Never ===
- Antonio Serra, Michele Medda, Bepi Vigna, Stefano Piani, Stefano Vietti (text), Valentina Romeo, Romeo Toffanetti, Giancarlo Olivares, Ivan Calcaterra (drawings); "Memorie del passato", in Nathan Never, no. 231, Sergio Bonelli Editore, September 2010.
- Antonio Serra, Mirko Perniola (text), Valentina Romeo, Guido Masala, Gino Vercelli, Silvia Corbetta (drawings); "Le chiavi del futuro", in Nathan Never, no. 254, Sergio Bonelli Editore, August 2012.
- Alberto Ostini (text), Val Romeo (drawings); "Haiku", in Nathan Never, no. 258, Sergio Bonelli Editore, November 2012.
- Davide Rigamonti (text), Valentina Romeo (drawings); "Tracce di verità", in Nathan Never, no. 333, Sergio Bonelli Editore, February 2019.

=== Other publications ===
- Federico Memola (text), Val Romeo (drawings); "Le dimore silenziose", in Rourke, no. 2, Star Comics, June 2009.
- Federico Memola (text), Val Romeo (drawings); "Vite spezzate", in Rourke, no. 7, Star Comics, April 2010.
- Paola Barbato (text), Val Romeo (drawings); "Puntata 34", in Really-Web Comic, 15 March 2012.
- Moreno Burattini (text), Valentina Romeo (drawings); "Il lupo e la luna", in Maxi Zagor, no. 37, Sergio Bonelli Editore, September 2019.
- Luigi Mignacco (text), Val Romeo (drawings); "La prigioniera degli Huron", in Color Zagor, no. 13, Sergio Bonelli Editore, August 2021.
