= Volto Nascosto =

Volto Nascosto (Italian: "Hidden Face") is the title of an Italian short comic series written by Gianfranco Manfredi for Sergio Bonelli Editore. The first issue was published on 10 October 2007.

The miniseries is made up of 14 issues, meant to form a single, long graphic novel, as Manfredi already did with Magico Vento.

Among the artists working on the series there are Goran Parlov (the characters' graphic creator and first issue's artist), Massimo Rotundo (also the covers' author), Giuseppe Matteoni, Ersin Burak (a Turkish artist at his first experience with Bonelli), Roberto Diso, Giovanni Freghieri, Alessandro Nespolino, Leomacs and Gigi Simeoni.

== Plot ==
The story is set up towards the end of the nineteenth century and takes place among Rome, Ethiopia (the only African country that, in this period, resisted European imperialism) and Eritrea, Italian colonies in Africa.

The main character is "Volto Nascosto", a mysterious Islamic warrior and prophet whose face is covered with a silver mask and who, in the story, leads the resistance of Ethiopian people against foreign invaders. (His figure was based on real Islamic legends.) However, the series doesn't only revolve around Volto Nascosto, but deals with various characters, whose events continuously intertwine with each other. This multiplicity of voices is a rather innovative aspect of Bonelli's publishing house.

The characters playing around Volto Nascosto are:

- Ugo Pastore, an honest and loyal young man, skilful in the use of a pistol. After changing several jobs, he adapts himself to an accountant's role at a notary's office;
- Enea Pastore, Ugo's father and the owner of the Caput Mundi firm;
- Menelik II (a real historical figure), the King of Ethiopia and Taytu's husband;
- Taytu (a real historical figure), the Queen of Ethiopia and Menelik's wife;
- Vittorio De Cesari, Ugo's best friend, a cavalry lieutenant from a noble family, fond of adventure and beautiful women;
- Matilde Sereni, a Roman girl from a wealthy family, the victim of a nervous illness. Ugo is in love with her, but she loves Vittorio (who, however, doesn't return her feelings).

As it is clear from this short description, the series has a strong literary inspiration and deliberately merges elements from different genres, from classic adventure to historical novel and nineteenth century feuilleton. This last aspect is particularly evident not only in the choice of the serial formula, but also in the presence of some typical situations: the love triangle, the sensitive girl with a mysterious past, etc., which directly recall the topoi of nineteenth century novels and operas.

Another interesting feature of the story is the setting in late nineteenth century Italy, a not very well known period of Italian history and an unusual choice for a comic-book series.

== The issues ==
Volto Nascosto's adventures are published monthly, in the usual format of Sergio Bonelli's comic books (paperbacks 16x21 cm (6.3x8.3 in), with 96 pages).

The series is made up of the following issues:

Nr.	Title	Date	Story	Script	Art	Cover
1	I predoni del deserto ("The desert plunderers")	October 2007	Gianfranco Manfredi	Gianfranco Manfredi	Goran Parlov	Massimo Rotundo
2	Briganti ("Brigands")	November 2007	Gianfranco Manfredi	Gianfranco Manfredi	Massimo Rotundo	Massimo Rotundo
3	Amore e morte ("Love and death")	December 2007	Gianfranco Manfredi	Gianfranco Manfredi	Alessandro Nespolino	Massimo Rotundo
4	Amba Alagi ("Amba Alagi")	January 2008	Gianfranco Manfredi	Gianfranco Manfredi	Ersin Burak	Massimo Rotundo
5	La fortezza ("The fortress")	February 2008	Gianfranco Manfredi	Gianfranco Manfredi	Leomacs	Massimo Rotundo
6	Gli eroi di Macallé ("The heroes of Mek'ele")	March 2008	Gianfranco Manfredi	Gianfranco Manfredi	Roberto Diso	Massimo Rotundo
7	Il fantasma ("The ghost")	April 2008	Gianfranco Manfredi	Gianfranco Manfredi	Giovanni Freghieri	Massimo Rotundo
8	La strada per Adua ("The road to Adwa")	May 2008	Gianfranco Manfredi	Gianfranco Manfredi	Alessandro Nespolino	Massimo Rotundo
9	Pioggia di sangue ("Blood rain")	June 2008	Gianfranco Manfredi	Gianfranco Manfredi	Giuseppe Matteoni	Massimo Rotundo
10	Il presidio ("The garrison")	July 2008	Gianfranco Manfredi	Gianfranco Manfredi	Ersin Burak	Massimo Rotundo
11	Il prigioniero di Menelik ("The prisoner of Menelik")	August 2008	Gianfranco Manfredi	Gianfranco Manfredi	Ersin Burak	Massimo Rotundo
12	La liberazione ("The liberation")	September 2008	Gianfranco Manfredi	Gianfranco Manfredi	Alessandro Nespolino	Massimo Rotundo
13	Medaglia d'oro ("Gold medal")	October 2008	Gianfranco Manfredi	Gianfranco Manfredi	Gigi Simeoni	Massimo Rotundo
14	Dietro la maschera ("Behind the mask")	November 2008	Gianfranco Manfredi	Gianfranco Manfredi	Massimo Rotundo	Massimo Rotundo

== See also ==
- First Italo-Ethiopian War
