= Luigi Piccatto =

Italian comic artist (1954–2023)

- Born: 13 July 1954; Turin, Italy
- Died: 14 March 2023 (aged 68); Asti, Italy
- Occupation: Cartoonist

Luigi Piccatto (13 July 1954 – 14 March 2023) was an Italian comic artist and illustrator.

== Life and career ==
Born in Turin, Piccatto started his career in 1977, illustrating the series Chris Lean in Corrier Boy. He then collaborated with comics magazines such as Corriere dei Piccoli, Skorpio, and Lanciostory. In 1986 he entered Sergio Bonelli Editore, mainly collaborating on the Dylan Dog series, of which he illustrated 66 comic books of the regular series including the classic Golconda!, as well as the whole spin-off series Groucho and other special issues. Other Bonelli collaborations include Nathan Never, Magico Vento, Demian and Kent Darwin.

Piccatto opened a School of Comics in Asti, having among his pupils Marvel artist Andrea Broccardo, Diabolik illustrators Giulia Francesca Massaglia and Stefania Caretta, and Bonelli collaborator Cristiano Spadavecchia. He was also co-founder, quarterback and later coach of the Turin American football team Giaguari Torino, of which he created the team logo. He also served as president of the rugby union team Takatani. He died on 14 March 2023, at the age of 68.
