= Angelo Stano =

Italian comic book artist

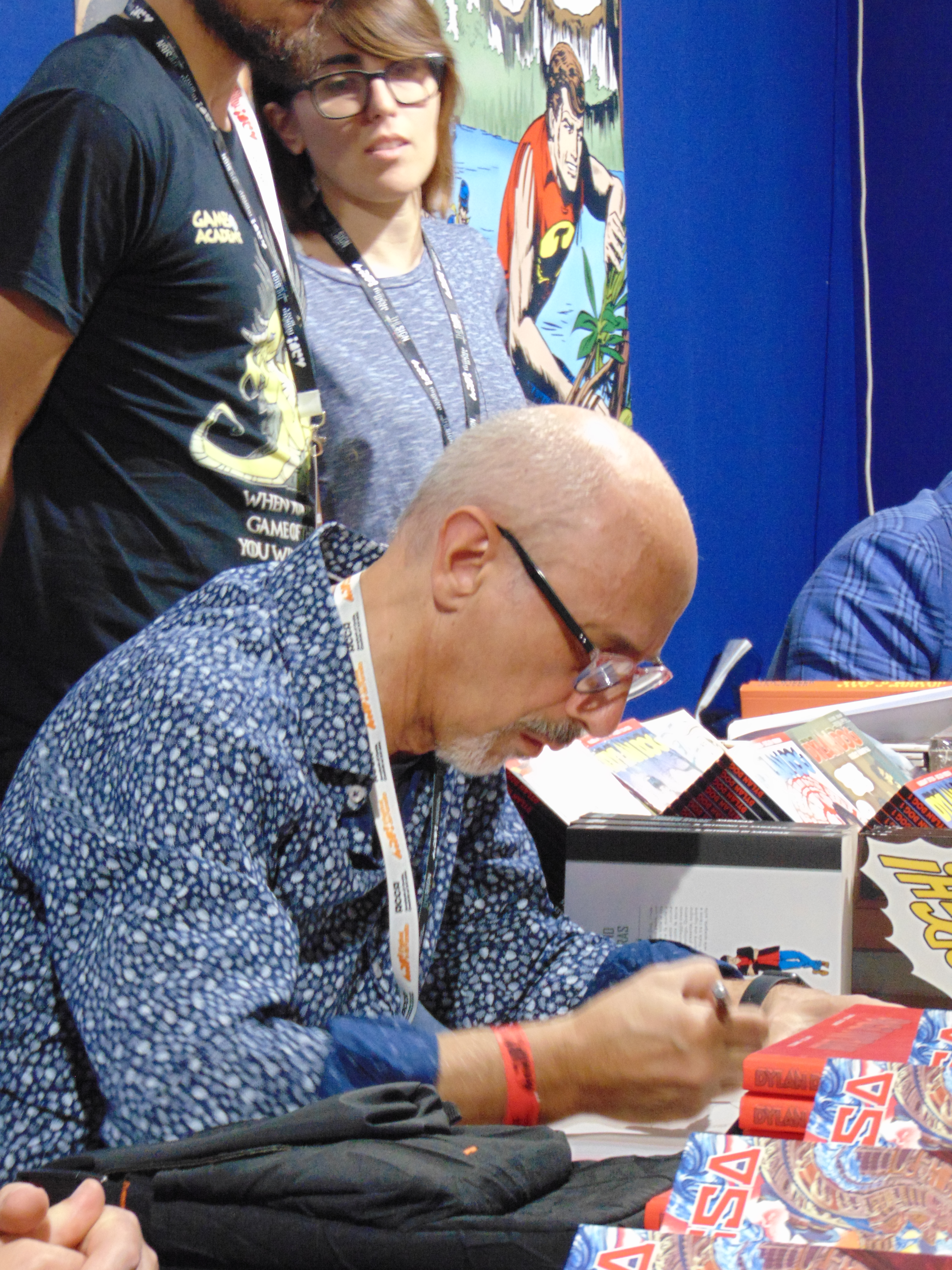
- Angelo Stano at ARF! Festival 2019 in Rome
- Born: 6 January 1953 (age 73); Santeramo in Colle
- Occupation: Cartoonist
- Writing career
- Genre: Comics
- Notable awards: Bonaventura Award, 1992; U Giancu's Prize, 2003

Angelo Stano (born 6 January 1953) is an Italian comic book artist. He provided drawings for Dylan Dog, including for the first story. He was, up to the issue no. 363, the series cover artist and was later replaced by Luigi Cavenago.

== Biography ==
Angelo Stano was born at Santeramo in Colle, in the province of Bari, in the south of Italy. In 1971, he moved to Milan.

His debut as a comic illustrator came in 1973 with a production of Jules Verne's From the Earth to the Moon. Two years later he produced several stories for Audax, published by Mondadori.

In 1975, he created stories for the weekly Audax, directed by Nino Cannata for Arnoldo Mondadori Editore, as well as brief episodes of war stories for Editorial Dardo.

After several collaborations with other publishers (Ediperiodici, Edifumetto, Staff di If, Corrier Boy, Universo), in 1985 he was chosen by Sergio Bonelli Editore to draw the first episode of Dylan Dog, written by Tiziano Sclavi. Stano drew it in a style partly inspired by artist Egon Schiele. Stano replaced Claudio Villa as cover artist for the series with #42.

In 1991, he illustrated the Tarot of Dylan Dog designed by Tiziano Sclavi. The work was published by The Beetle in Turin together with Interview with Dylan Dog, written by Giordano Berti.

In 1992, he was awarded the Bonaventura Award by Treviso Comix for reprints of paperboard Arnoldo Mondadori Editore dedicated to Dylan Dog.

From 1981 to 1999, he taught at the School of Comics in Milan.

Stano wrote and illustrated the Dylan Dog issue named "La legione degli scheletri" released in December 2012, in addition to the cover art.
