= Corrado Roi =

Italian comic book artist

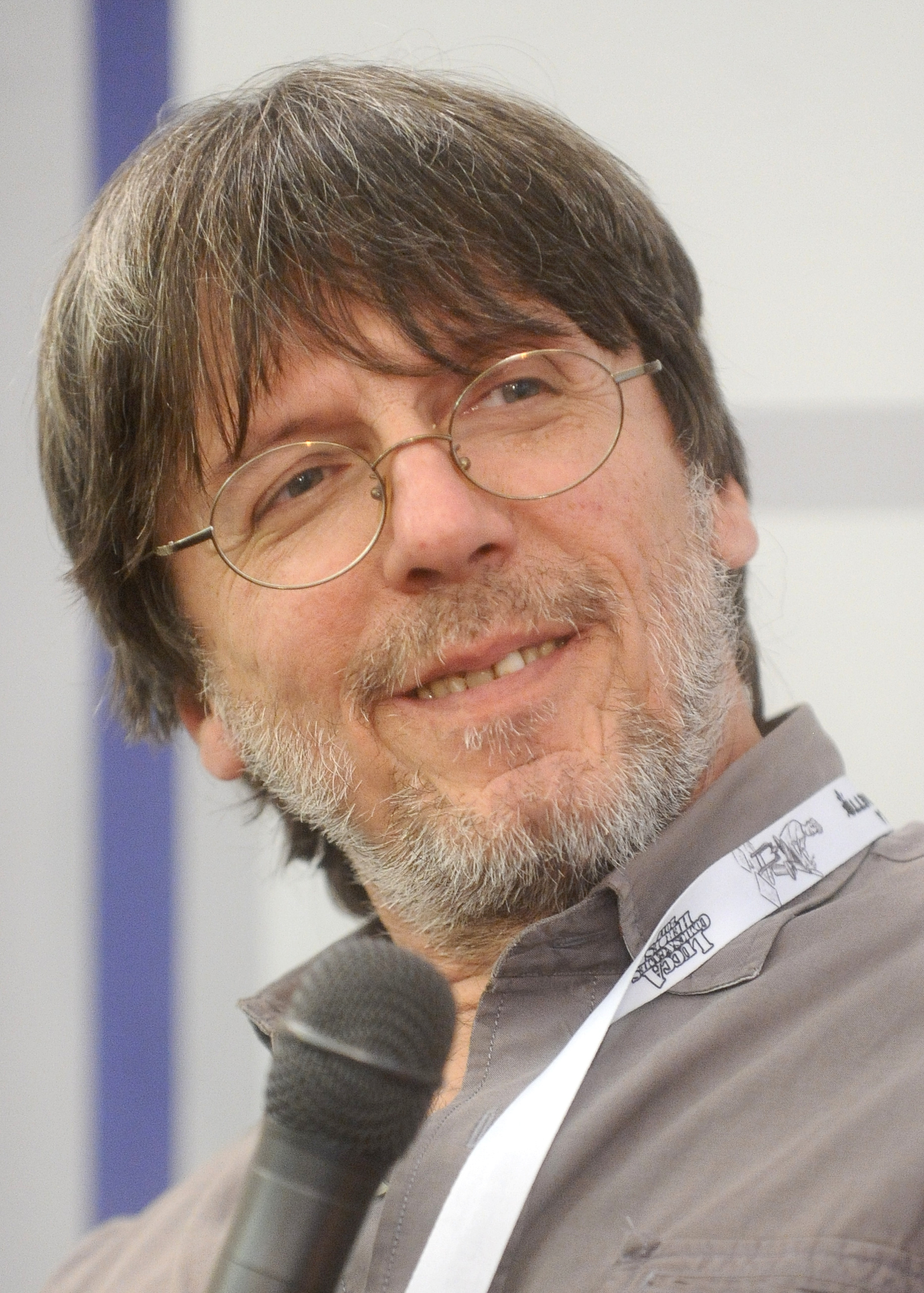
Corrado Roi

Corrado Roi (born February 11, 1958) is an Italian comic book artist.

Roi was born in Laveno Mombello, province of Varese, Lombardy.

He published stories for Il Monello and Staff di If until, in 1986, he became one of the artists working at Dylan Dog, for Sergio Bonelli Editore. The newborn horror series soon became the most sold in Italian comics, and imposed Roi's atmospherical, dark qualities in the field.

Roi also drew episodes and covers for the following Bonelli's series: Mister No, Martin Mystère, Nick Raider, Zona X, Julia, Magico Vento and Brendon.
