= Corrado Mastantuono =

Italian comic book artist

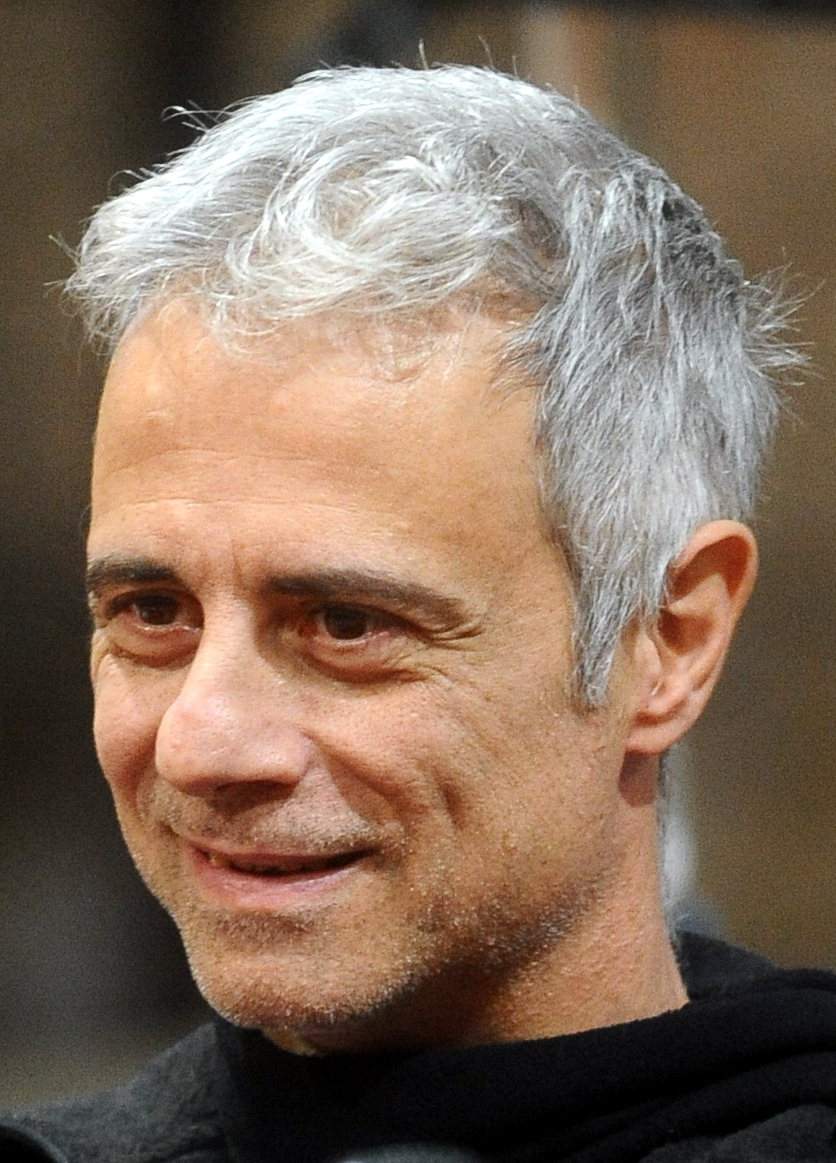
- Corrado Mastantuono
- Born: December 20, 1962 (age 63) Rome, Italy
- Area: Artist
- Notable works: Nick Raider; Magico Vento
- Awards: U Giancu's Prize, 2002

Corrado Mastantuono (born 20 December 1962) is an Italian comic book artist.

Born in Rome, Mastantuono worked in the animation field until 1989, and then started to work for the Italian magazine L'Eternauta. He subsequently worked on Disney comics with the Italian branch of Walt Disney Productions.

In recent times he collaborated extensively with Sergio Bonelli Editore, Italian comics main publisher, for series including Nick Raider and Magico Vento. In 2004 he released the fantasy Elias le maudit for Les Humanoïdes Associés.
