= Claudio Villa (comics) =

Italian comics artist (born 1959)

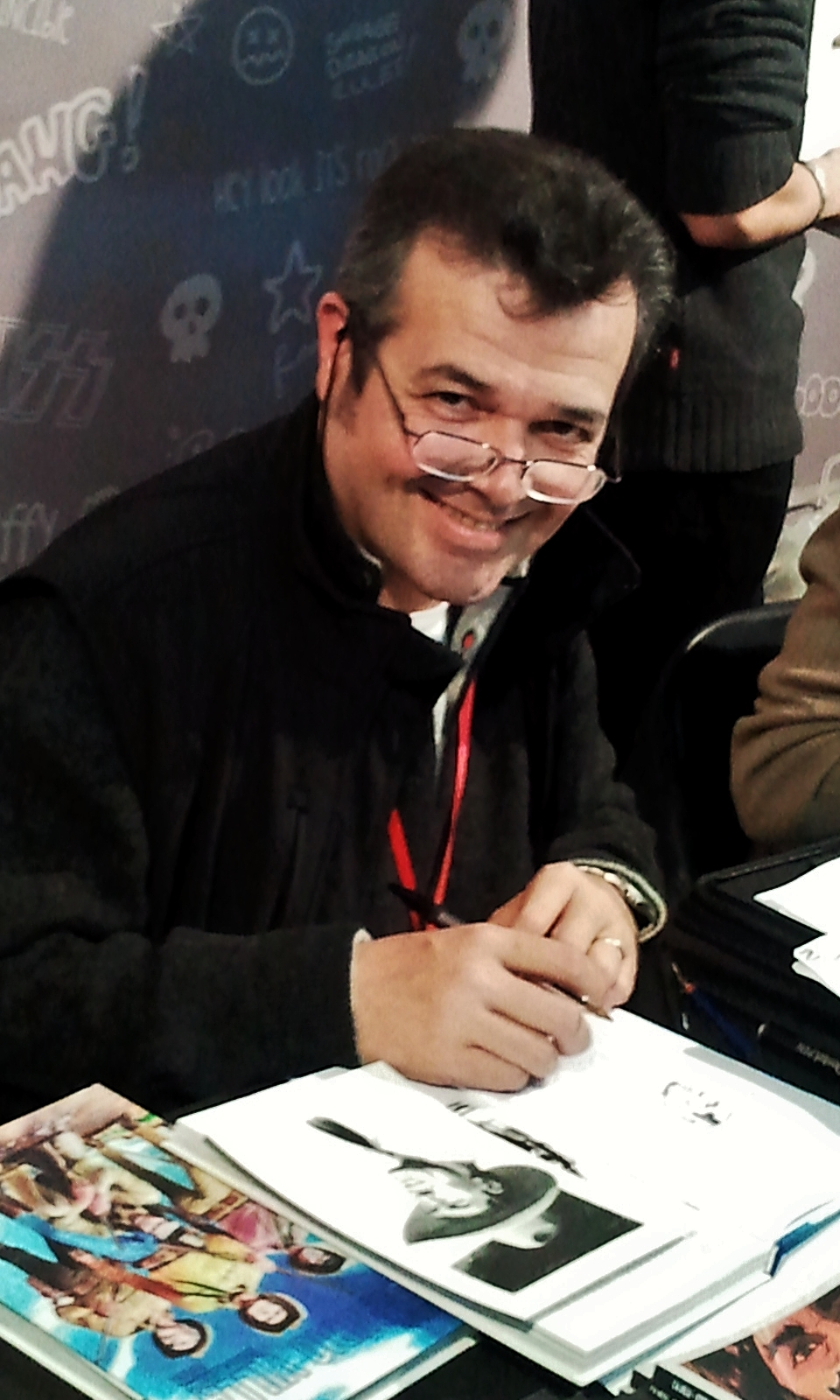
- Claudio Villa at Lucca Comics & Games, Lucca 2012
- Born: 31 October 1959 (age 67) Lomazzo, Italy
- Area: artist

Claudio Villa (born 31 October 1959 in Lomazzo, Lombardy) is an Italian comics artist who has primarily worked with Sergio Bonelli Editore, and is currently involved in illustrating several books in the Tex Willer comic series. He has mostly drawn covers since number 400th, but sometimes also draws stories, such as Tex #501 - 504.

== Career ==
Villa was hired by Sergio Bonelli in 1982 where he was sent to work with the staff responsible for Martin Mystère. After four episodes Villa was called to draw Bonelli's most famous character, Tex Willer. In 1986 he started drawing some covers for the Dylan Dog series, becoming the official cover illustrator until number 41, and for Nick Raider.
