= Paola Barbato =

Italian writer of comics and novels

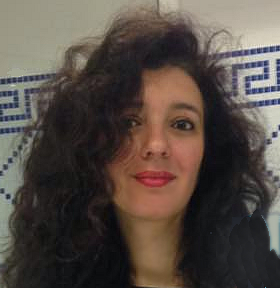
- Paola Barbato
- Born: 18 June 1971 (age 55); Milan, Italy
- Citizenship: Italian
- Occupation: Writer
- Writing career
- Language: Italian
- Genres: Novels, comics
- Notable awards: U Giancu's Prize, 2009
- Website: www.paolabarbato.it

Paola Barbato (born 18 June 1971) is an Italian writer of comics and novels. She is part of the writing staff of the Italian comic book Dylan Dog, published by Sergio Bonelli Editore.

== Career ==
Born in Milan, Barbato is part of the writing staff of Dylan Dog, an Italian comic, published by Sergio Bonelli Editore.

She has published three novels published by Rizzoli. She has also published Graphic novels, released by Bonelli.

She co-wrote for Filmmaster fiction In the Name of Evil with Fabrizio Bentivoglio, broadcast on Sky Channel in June 2009. In 2011 she debuted with an Italian comic-style shojo manga.

In 2012, she wrote the script for Il boia di Parigi, the first issue of the new series by Bonelli. The story is drawn by Giampiero Casertano.

Besides writing, Barbato is involved in social activities and philanthropy as president of Mauro Emolo, a non-governmental organisation that deals with people suffering from Huntington's Chorea.

== Bibliography ==
=== Novels ===
- Bilico (Rizzoli, 2006)
- Mani nude (Rizzoli, 2008)
- Il filo rosso (Rizzoli, 2010)

=== Comic books ===
- Dylan Dog n. 157 – Il sonno della ragione (1999)
- Dylan Dog n. 163 – Il mondo perfetto (with Tiziano Sclavi) (2000)
- Dylan Dog n. 167 – Medusa
- Dylan Dog n. 169 – Lo specchio dell'anima
- Dylan Dog n. 172 – Memorie dal sottosuolo
- Dylan Dog n. 175 – Il seme della follia (2001)
- Dylan Dog n. 183 – Requiem per un mostro
- Dylan Dog n. 185 – Phobia (2002)
- Dylan Dog n. 189 – Il prezzo della morte
- Dylan Dog n. 191 – Sciarada
- Dylan Dog n. 200 – Il numero duecento (2003)
- Dylan Dog n. 202 – Il settimo girone
- Dylan Dog n. 206 – Nebbia
- Dylan Dog n. 210 – Il pifferaio magico (2004)
- Dylan Dog n. 212 – Necropolis
- Dylan Dog n. 221 – Il tocco del diavolo (2005)
- Dylan Dog n. 228 – Oltre quella porta
- Dylan Dog n. 234 – L'ultimo arcano (2006)
- Dylan Dog n. 241 – Xabaras
- Dylan Dog n. 242 – In nome del padre
- Dylan Dog n. 245 – Il cimitero dei freaks (2007)
- Dylan Dog n. 279 – Il giardino delle illusioni (2009)
- Dylan Dog n. 292 – Anime prigioniere (2011)
- Dylan Dog n. 296 – La seconda occasione (2011)
- Dylan Dog n. 313 − Il Crollo
- Dylan Dog n. 338 − Ma più, ispettore Bloch
- Dylan Dog n. 346 − ...E cenere tornerai
- Dylan Dog n. 347 − Gli abbandonati
- Dylan Dog n. 349 − La morta non dimentica
- Dylan Dog n. 355 − L'uomo dei tuoi segni
- Dylan Dog n. 360 − Remington House
- Dylan Dog n. 363 − Cose perdute
- Dylan Dog n. 372 − Il bianco e il nero
- Dylan Dog n. 380 − Nessuno è innocente
- Dylan Dog n. 388 − Esercizio numero 6
- Dylan Dog n. 390 − La caduta degli dei
- Dylan Dog n. 391 − Il sangue della terra
- Dylan Dog n. 392 − Il primordio
- Dylan Dog n. 394 − Eterne stagioni
- Dylan Dog n. 397 − Morbo M
- Dylan Dog n. 398 − Chi muore si rivede
- Allegato a Dylan Dog Albo Speciale n. 12 – "Il cavaliere di sventura"
- Dylan Dog Albo Speciale n. 18 – La Scelta
- Dylan Dog Albo Speciale n. 19 – La Peste
- Dylan Dog Albo Speciale n. 24 – Il santuario
- Dylan Dog Almanacco della paura 2001 – Qualcuno nell'ombra
- Dylan Dog Albo Gigante n. 13 – Il senza nome
- Dylan Dog Albo Gigante n. 15 – La lunga note
- Dylan Dog Albo Gigante n. 16/4 – Il dogma
- Dylan Dog Albo Gigante n. 18/3 – Tueentoun
- Dylan Dog Maxi n. 4/1 – L'esodo
- Dylan Dog Maxi n. 6/1 – Il capobranco
- Dylan Dog Color Fest n. 2/2 – Videokiller
- Dylan Dog Color Fest n. 6/3 – La predatrice
- Series "Le Storie" – n.1 "Il boia di Parigi"
- Davvero n. 1 – Cambiamenti
- Davvero n. 2 – Troppi cambiamenti
- Davvero n. 3 – Scherzare col fuoco
- Black Death n. 4 - Into the Black
- Black Death: Saga Completa (Editora Lorentz)

=== Graphic novels ===
- Romanzo a fumetti Bonelli n. 3 – "Sighma" (2008)
- Romanzo a fumetti Bonelli n. 7 – "Darwin" (2012)
