= Eugenio Sicomoro =

Italian comic book artist

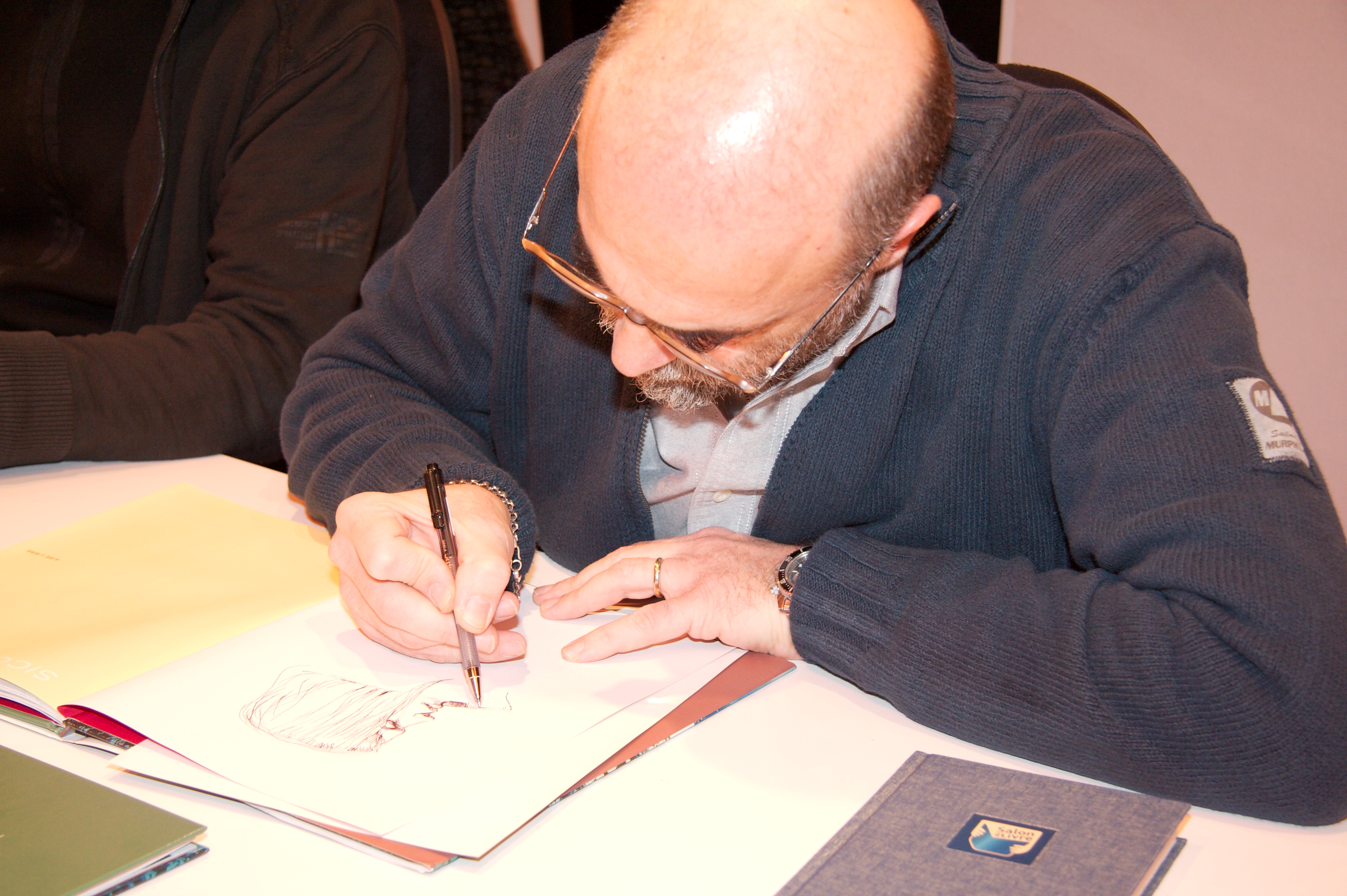
Eugenio Sicomoro at Salon du livre 2008 (Paris, France)

Eugenio Sicomoro, byname of Bruno Brunetti (born 16 September 1952) is an Italian comic book artist.

Born in Rome, Sicomoro made his debut in the late 1970s on the Italian magazine Lanciostory. Later, together with Claude Moliterni, he created the series Rouletabille (also Marc Jourdan) for the Franco-Belgian comics magazines Pilote and Charlie Mensuel. He is also the creator of Sida Connection, a single-issue story about AIDS, and the mini-series Lumière Froide, both with Pierre Makyo. Among other works, especially in the illustration field, he recently pencilled some issues of Magico Vento for Sergio Bonelli Editore.
