= Massimo Rotundo =

Italian comics artist (born 1955)

- Born: 11 April 1955 (age 71) Rome, Italy
- Areas: Artist, writer
- Notable works: Volto Nascosto; Prediction
- Awards: Yellow Kid (1990), Gran Guinigi (1990), F.M. Trani (1992)

Massimo Rotundo (born 11 April 1955) is an Italian comics artist.

== Biography ==
After attending the Academy of Fine Arts, Rotundo made his debut as comics artist in 1978 in collaboration with Eura Editoriale. Later he worked for other publications, like L'Eternauta, Comic Art, Orient Express, Heavy Metal and Ècho des Savanes. In particular, Rotundo stands out for his erotic comics, with the series Ex Libris Eroticis, which recalls the tradition of illustrated erotic literature from the early 1900s. His growing reputation in the erotic comics genre led him to work in the French market as well, where he is well known and appreciated.

Rotundo is also widely appreciated for his adaptation of literary masterpieces, like Honoré de Balzac’s novel La peau de Chagrin, Pasolini (based on Jean Dufaux's script) and Luciano De Crescenzo's The Greek Myths.

In Italy, Rotundo's work includes several projects with Sergio Bonelli Editore, starting with his drawings for the comic book Brendon. He became the official cover artist of Bonelli, from the 45th issue of the series. In 2007, he worked as comics and cover artist for the mini-series Volto Nascosto, also published by Bonelli. He drew for Bonelli Editore Tex "Storm on Galvestone" for the editorial series Albo Speciale "Texone". He collaborated with the writer Giuseppe Ferrandino as comics artist for Nero, Sandokan and Sera Torbara. He also worked with the French publisher Delcourt on the comic book Prediction with a script by Pierre Makyo.

Rotundo is one of the founders, as well as a teacher in, the comics academy Scuola Romana del Fumetto in Rome. He works regularly in cinema and theatre. As an illustrator, he has collaborated with the costume designer Milena Canonero in several films and plays. As a sketch artist he has worked on the films Crusade (never made) by Paul Verhoeven, Titus by Julie Taymor (Academy Awards nomination for costumes), The Wolfman by Joe Johnston and Gangs of New York by Martin Scorsese. He has also worked as a character designer for animation films, like the series Ulysses (Premio Kineo-Diamanti Cartoon On The Bay in Venice - Venice International Film Festival 2012), produced by Rai (the State-owned Italian national broadcasting company) and The Animation Band.

Rotundo has several awards, such as The Yellow Kid (1990), as best Italian comics artist, the Gran Guinigi from Lucca in the same year, and the F. M. di Trani, City of Foiano award (1992).

In 2018, Rotundo won the Golden Romics for his career.
