= Bruno Brindisi =

Italian comic book artist

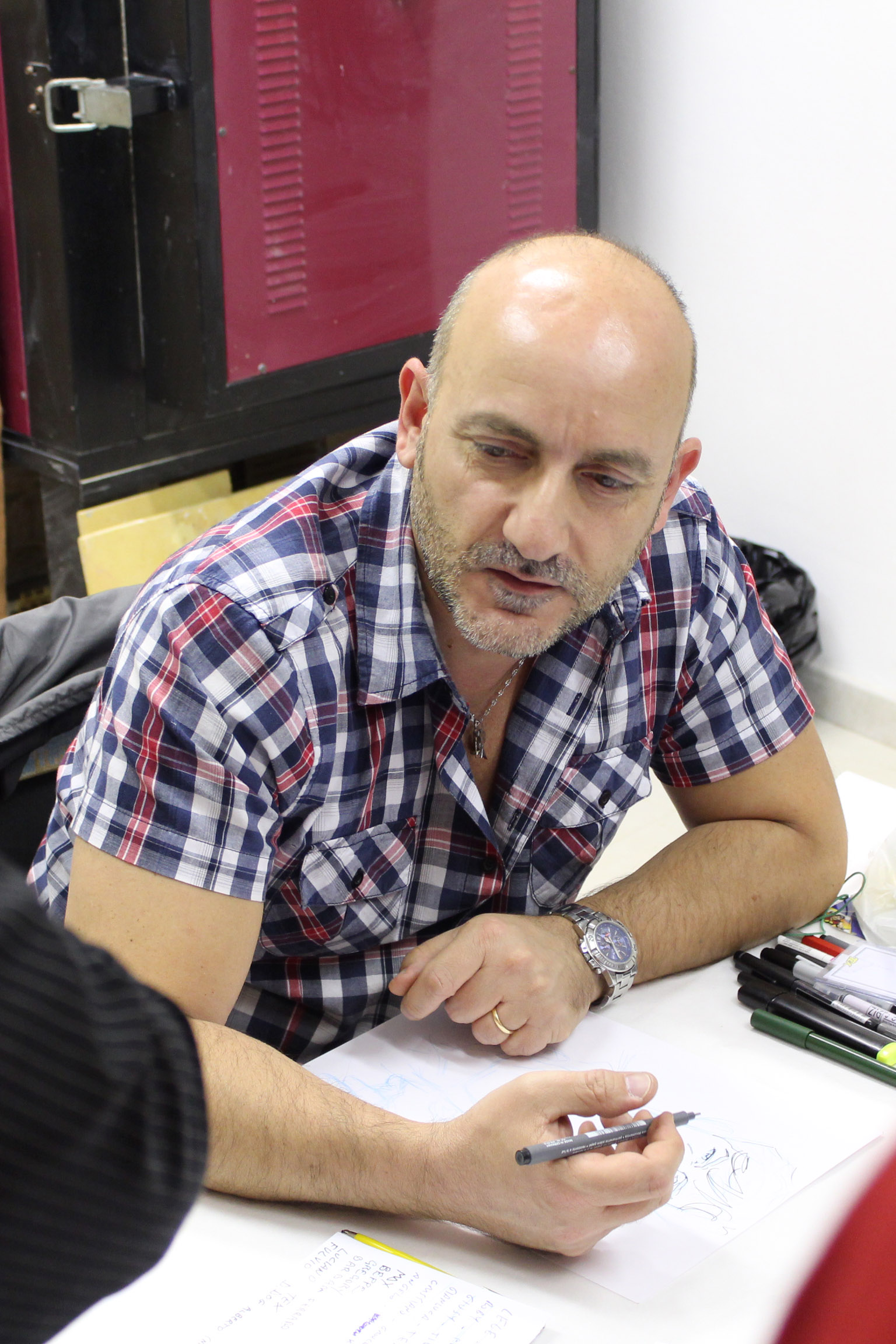
- Bruno Brindisi in 2013
- Born: 3 June 1964 (age 62) Salerno
- Areas: Penciller, Inker
- Awards: U Giancu's Prize, 2011

Bruno Brindisi (born 3 June 1964) is an Italian comic book artist.

== Biography ==
Brindisi was born at Salerno, and debuted in the amateur publication Truemoon. Later, he started drawing erotic comics for Blue Press and Ediperiodici.

In 1991, he entered the regular staff of the horror series Dylan Dog, published by Sergio Bonelli Editore, debuting with #51, entitled "Il male". For the same publisher, Brindisi also realised episodes of Nick Raider and a special for Tex Willer (2002), written by Claudio Nizzi. For Dylan Dog, Brindisi was selected in particular as the artist for the 200th issue and for the 20th anniversary celebrative one. As of November 2014, Brindisi has drawn a total of 39 Dylan Dog stories, including regular and special series.

In 2005–2006, he drew two albums for the French series Novikov, with script by Patrick Weber.

In 2012, he drew for Astorina the comic book Il segreto di Diabolik. In December of the same year, again for Bonelli, he drew the one-shot La rivolta dei Sepoy, written by Giuseppe De Nardo for the series Le storie.

In 2013, he became the regular cover artist for Dylan Dog - Collezione storica a colori, a series reprinting Dylan Dog stories in colour.
