= Diana Manfredi =

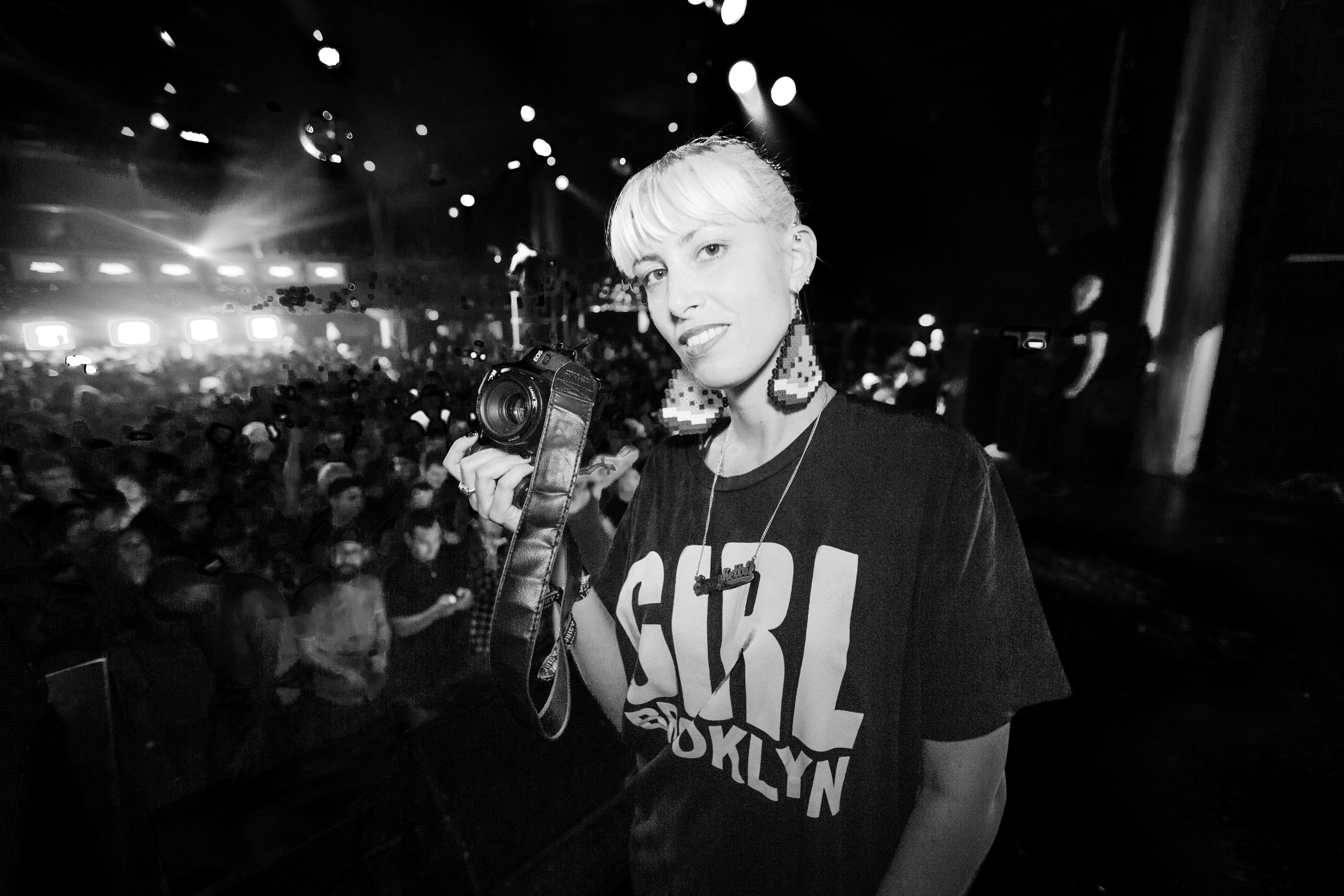
Photo of Diana "Spaghetto" Manfredi by Gianfilippo De Rossi

Diana "Spaghetto" Manfredi (born 1983 in Milan, Italy) is an Italian director, journalist, editor and animator. She is better known by the name Spaghetto.

== Early life and education ==
Her father is the Italian writer, singer and actor Gianfranco Manfredi. She started as a filmmaker in the late 1990s filming punk shows and editing skateboarding videos. After earning her BA in video art and History of art at Brera Academy, in 2001 she directed her first documentary Skaterz which sold out theaters in Milan and won the Human Landscape grant. She then moved to Barcelona, Spain where in 2002 she earned her master's degree in Direction of Documentaries and co-directed the feature-length documentary Entrada de Servicio.

== Career ==
In 2003 she traveled to South Africa to produce and direct her third documentary District Six – Time To Return Home, which was released in 2005 and was invited to many film festivals across Europe and the US. After directing a few commercials for MTV and taking part to The Urban Edge Show, the first big European comprehensive street art exhibition, in 2006 she moved to San Francisco where she worked on many projects, directed two TV shows for Bonsai TV and won the Audience Award at the 7 Day Film Festival with the short film Talking to Mister Wall. In 2010 she started her own production company Spaghetto Productions, and in 2011 she moved to Los Angeles where she made a name for herself as a music video director. She has directed music videos for Dillon Francis, Brooke Candy, Casey Veggies, AraabMuzik, Cerebral Ballzy, and many more. In her videos she often uses a style of animation called rotoscoping. In 2011 she directed the short film Face-off featuring photographer Estevan Oriol that was premiered during the exhibition Art in the Streets at MOCA. She has worked with many labels and brands and her work has been featured in many international publications including Rolling Stone, Vanity Fair, Complex, VICE, Hypebeast, Beatport, MTV, Frank 151, Marie Claire, and many more. Her latest film is a documentary about twerking called #Twerkumentary that premiered at the Wiltern Theatre in Los Angeles on 10 June 2016. The film features among others Too Short, E-40, Big Freedia, Diplo, Kreayshawn, George Clinton, Khia and DJ Jubilee.
