= Cemetery Man =

1994 Italian horror film

- Italian film poster
- Directed by: Michele Soavi
- Screenplay by: Gianni Romoli
- Based on: Dellamorte Dellamore by Tiziano Sclavi
- Produced by: Tilde Corsi; Gianni Romoli; Michele Soavi
- Starring: Rupert Everett; François Hadji-Lazaro; Anna Falchi
- Cinematography: Mauro Marchetti
- Edited by: Franco Fraticelli
- Music by: Manuel De Sica
- Production company: Audifilm
- Distributed by: Distribuzione Angelo Rizzoli Cinematografica (Italy); PolyGram Filmed Entertainment (France)
- Release date: 1994
- Running time: 100 minutes
- Countries: Italy; France; Germany
- Languages: Italian; English

Cemetery Man (Italian: Dellamorte Dellamore) is a 1994 zombie comedy horror film directed by Michele Soavi and starring Rupert Everett, François Hadji-Lazaro and Anna Falchi. It was produced by Tilde Corsi, Gianni Romoli and Soavi and based on the novel Dellamorte Dellamore by Tiziano Sclavi. Everett plays a beleaguered caretaker of a small Italian cemetery, who searches for love while defending himself from dead people who keep rising again. It is an international co-production between Italy, France, and Germany.

== Plot ==
Francesco Dellamorte is the cemetery caretaker in the small Italian town of Buffalora. He lives in a ramshackle house on the premises, constantly surrounded by death, with only his mentally disabled assistant Gnaghi for company. Young punks in town spread gossip that Dellamorte is impotent. His hobbies are reading outdated telephone directories, in which he crosses out the names of the deceased, and trying to assemble a puzzle shaped like a human skull. Gnaghi can speak only one word: "Gna".

The Latin inscription over the Buffalora Cemetery gate reads RESURRECTURIS ("For those who will rise again"), and indeed, some people rise from their graves as aggressive zombies within seven nights following their deaths. Dellamorte destroys these creatures, which he calls "Returners", before they overrun the town. Buffalora's mayor is so fixated on his reelection campaign that he does not register Dellamorte's pleas for an investigation. Being an outcast in the village and almost illiterate, Dellamorte does not want to lose his job. He opens up to his only friend, Franco, a municipal clerk, but does not file the paperwork to get assistance. He explains, "It's easier just to shoot them."

At a funeral, Dellamorte falls in love with the young widow of a rich, elderly man. She is won over when Dellamorte tells her about the ossuary, which she adores. While consummating their relationship by her late husband's grave, the undead partner arises and bites her. She seems to die, but the coroner claims it was a heart attack. Fearing the worst, Dellamorte stays near her corpse, and shoots her when she rises.

Gnaghi becomes infatuated with the mayor's teen daughter, Valentina, but she is tragically decapitated in a motorcycle accident. Undeterred, Gnaghi digs up her reanimated head and begins an innocent romance. The relationship is cut short, however, when the mayor finds out and Valentina rips out his throat with her teeth, forcing Dellamorte to shoot her. The young widow also rises again, causing Dellamorte to believe she was not really a zombie when he first shot her, in which case it was he who killed her. He plummets into a depression and is visited by the leering figure of Death, who tells him to "Stop killing the dead" and suggests shooting the living instead. His grip on reality slipping, Dellamorte heads into town at night and kills the punks who have made fun of him for years.

Dellamorte encounters two more unnamed women, identical in appearance to his now-dead lover. The first is an assistant to the new mayor. She confesses to Dellamorte that she is terrified of sexual penetration, so Dellamorte demands to have his penis removed by the local doctor. Refusing to do so, the doctor instead gives him an injection to induce temporary impotence. Meanwhile, the woman, following being raped by and falling in love with her employer, has lost her phobia. She plans to marry her rapist and discards the cemetery man.

He encounters a third manifestation of the woman he loves, and they go to bed together, but when he later learns she is a prostitute, he kills her and two other women by setting their house on fire. Franco is accused of these murders after killing his wife and child, and attempts suicide. Dellamorte goes to visit Franco in the hospital. Sitting by the hospital bed, he casually murders a nun, a nurse, and a doctor. Franco claims to not recognize him. Distraught and confused, Dellamorte screams out a confession, but is ignored.

Gnaghi and Dellamorte pack up their car and leave Buffalora. Gnaghi's head is injured when Dellamorte slams on the brakes. They exit the vehicle and walk to the edge of the road, where it drops into a chasm. Gnaghi begins to seize and collapses to the ground. Dellamorte realizes that the rest of the world does not exist. Fearing his assistant is dying, he loads a gun with two dumdum bullets to finish them both off. However, Dellamorte cannot bring himself to shoot his friend. Gnaghi wakes up, drops the gun off the cliff, and asks to be taken home, speaking clearly for the first time. Dellamorte replies: "Gna." As the credits roll, the camera zooms out to reveal the two men standing in a snowglobe.

== Cast ==
- Rupert Everett as Francesco Dellamorte
- François Hadji-Lazaro as Gnaghi
- Anna Falchi as She
- Mickey Knox as Marshall Straniero
- Anton Alexander as Franco
- Fabiana Formica as Valentina Scanarotti
- Clive Riche as Dr. Vercesi
- Stefano Masciarelli as Mayor Scanarotti
- Alessandro Zamattio as Claudio
- Katja Anton as Claudio's girlfriend
- Barbara Cupisti as Magda
- Patrizia Punzo as Claudio's mother
- Renato Doris as She's husband
- Derek Jacobi as Death

== Production ==
The film is based on Tiziano Sclavi's novel Dellamorte Dellamore, written in 1983 but published in 1991. In 1986, Sclavi created the comic character Dylan Dog, who not only shares some characteristics with Francesco Dellamorte but was visually based on Rupert Everett (as an in-joke, the film cast Everett and costumed the character in a fashion deliberately reminiscent of Dylan Dog). Previous to the novel's publication, Sclavi had reused its plot in an issue of Dylan Dog guest-starring Francesco. The filmmakers were aware of this as well in casting Everett and alluding to the links between the two characters. In view of the above, and in terms of its plot, melancholic themes and use of Sclavi's trademark black humor, Cemetery Man is closer to an adaptation of Dylan Dog than the later 2011 adaptation starring Brandon Routh.

== Release ==
Cemetery Man was first released in 1994. American distributor October Films changed its title to Cemetery Man and released it on April 26, 1996.

Anchor Bay Entertainment released the film on R1 DVD in 2006 under the American title Cemetery Man. In May 2024, Cemetery Man was released on 4K-UHD and Blu-ray by boutique distributor Severin Films.

== Reception ==
Rotten Tomatoes, a review aggregator, reports that 63% of 32 surveyed critics gave the film a positive review; the average rating is 6.20/10. The site's consensus reads: "Cemetery Man will frustrate viewers seeking narrative cohesion or coherence, but this surreal brand of humor and horror should satisfy B-movie fans in the mood for quirk". Stephen Holden of The New York Times wrote that the film is unconventional but becomes repetitive as Everett dispatches shallow metaphors for fascism. Bob Stephens of The San Francisco Examiner wrote that the film suffers from an uneven tone but "is redeemed by his uncommon visual imagination". Deborah Young of Variety wrote, "A hip, offbeat horror item floating on a bed of dark philosophy, Dellamorte Dellamore is a deceptively easy genre picture with hidden depths." Mick LaSalle of the San Francisco Chronicle wrote, "It aims high and misses, but it does hold interest with visual flash, wry humor and a couple of sex scenes that can make steam come out of your ears." In more modern reviews, Bloody Disgusting rated it 5/5 stars and called it "one of the greatest cult films of the last twenty years". Joshua Siebalt of Dread Central rated it 4/5 stars and wrote that Soavi's direction and film's humor make it different and memorable.

Director Martin Scorsese called Dellamorte Dellamore one of the best Italian films of the 1990s.

== Sequel ==
In January 2011, Fangoria reported that director Michele Soavi was planning a sequel. Soavi planned to shoot the film sometime near the end of 2011 or early 2012.

== Bibliography ==
- Curti, Roberto (2016). Diabolika: Supercriminals, Superheroes and the Comic Book Universe in Italian Cinema. Midnight Marquee Press. ISBN 978-1-936168-60-6.
