= François Hadji-Lazaro =

French actor, musician and producer (1956–2023)

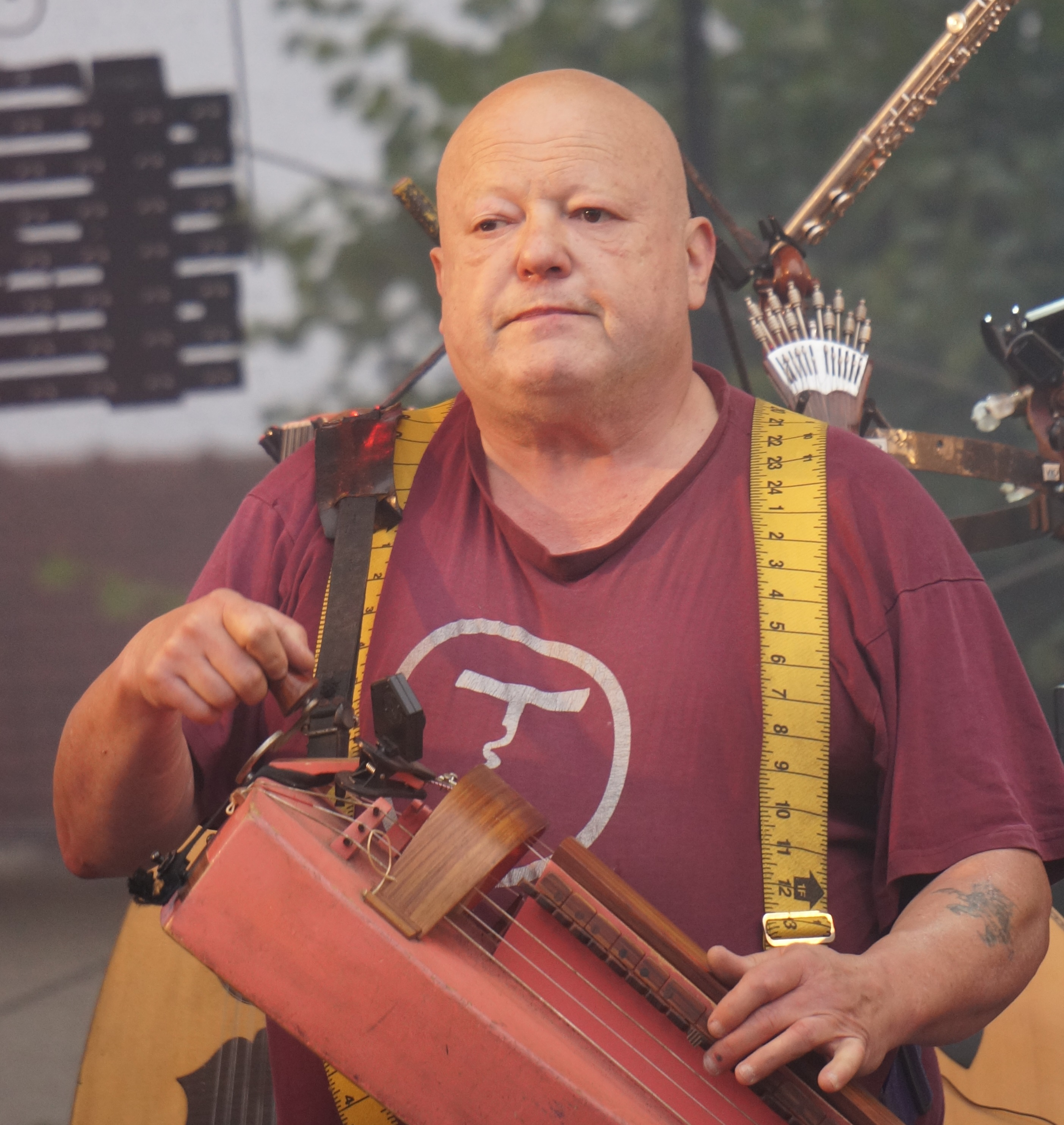
- Hadji-Lazaro, 2015
- Born: 22 June 1956; Paris, France
- Died: 25 February 2023 (aged 66)
- Occupation: Actor
- Years active: 1987–2023

François Hadji-Lazaro (22 June 1956 – 25 February 2023) was a French actor, musician and producer.

Hadji-Lazaro founded the French independent label Boucherie Productions (1985–2001) and played in many bands such as Les Garçons Bouchers (1986–1995) and Pigalle (1986–2018).

Hadji-Lazaro appeared in more than 20 films since 1987, including a lead role in Cemetery Man.

Hadji-Lazaro died on 25 February 2023, at the age of 66.

== Selected filmography ==
Year	Title	Role	Notes
1987	Beatrice		Credited as François Hadji Lazaro
1994	Cemetery Man	Gnaghi	
1995	The City of Lost Children	Killer	Credited as Francois Hadji-Lazaro
2001	Brotherhood of the Wolf	Machemort	Credited as François Hadji Lazaro
2002	My Voice	Bjorn	
2008	Dante 01	Moloch	
