= Magico Vento =

Fictional character

Magico Vento (Italian: Magic Wind) is the character of an Italian comic book Western of the same name, issued monthly by Sergio Bonelli Editore. Magico Vento's true name is Ned Ellis, a former member of the US Army who had become an Indian shaman. Graphically inspired to Irish actor Daniel Day-Lewis, Ellis is usually accompanied by Willy Richards, a journalist nicknamed Poe for his resemblance with the famous American writer.

The series was created in July 1997 by writer Gianfranco Manfredi. Horror and supernatural themes, often related to Indian legends and mythology, are also present.

The story is set in the United States, in the years after 1865, and is strongly connected to the American history of the period. Magico Vento, who had gained a strong reputation among the Sioux (Dakota) tribe who had housed him, often meets historical characters like George Armstrong Custer, Crazy Horse and Sitting Bull. He also took active part to notable events like the Battle of Little Big Horn.

Artists who worked on the series include José Ortiz, Ivo Milazzo, Eugenio Sicomoro, Corrado Roi, Darko Perović and Corrado Mastantuono.
