= Jonathan Steele (comics) =

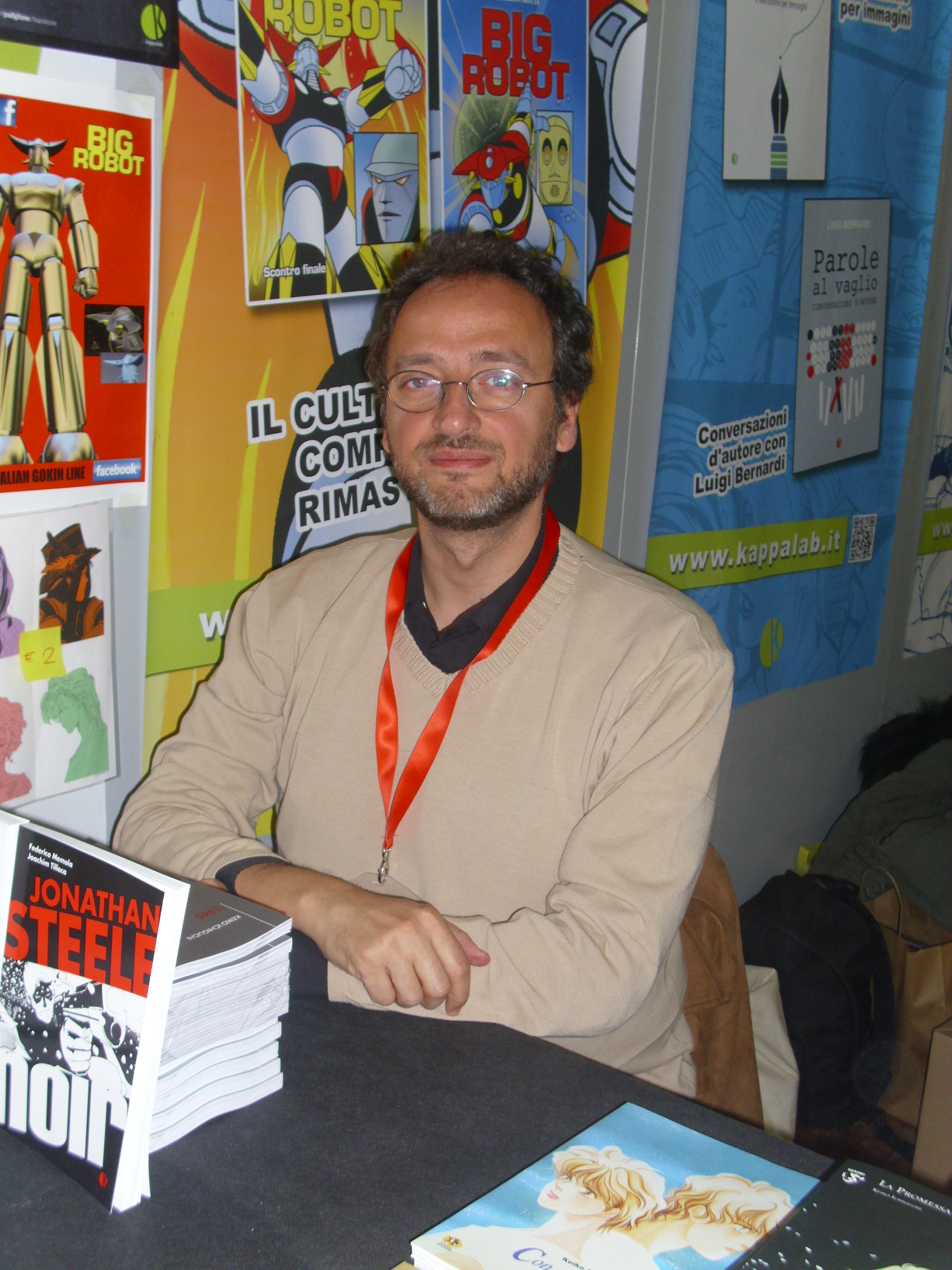
Federico Memola at Lucca Comics in 2014

Jonathan Steele is an Italian comic book series. It was published by Sergio Bonelli Editore from April 1999 to July 2004, for a total of 64 issues, and then by Star Comics, which restarted it from number 0. After 53 monthly issues and five annuals, it ended in 2009. Since 2012 a new series of graphic novels has started for Kappalab: Jonathan Steele Noir (2012), Jonathan Steele Rouge (2014), and Jonathan Steele Blanc (2016). Jonathan Steele was created and respectively written and primarily illustrated by Federico Memola and Teresa Marzia. Many other Italian artists have drawn the two monthly series, while the graphic novels are all illustrated by Joachim Tilloca.

The series' protagonist is Jonathan Steele, a detective who lives in 2020, in a world in which suddenly numerous people had turned into mutants and acquired magical powers. The second series was initially not directly connected with the first one, although Steele had some visions of adventures from the previous episodes. The new series is set in the present days, but in a world where magic has always existed. Jonathan is now an international thief who has left (perhaps) his old work to collaborate with the Enchantment Agency, run by the powerful mage Jasmine (whose appearance is inspired by the Canadian model Yasmeen Ghauri) and the half-fairy Myriam. The two girls are the main characters of the Jonathan Steele spin-off: The Enchantment Agency, published in five annuals (from 2005 to 2009) and currently available for free on Tapas (published from 2015 to 2019).
