= Dylan Dog =

Italian horror comics series

- Dylan Dog No. 62 cover by Angelo Stano

Publication information
- Publisher: Sergio Bonelli Editore
- Publication date: October 1986 – present
- No. of issues: 445
- Main character: Dylan Dog

Creative team
- Written by: Tiziano Sclavi; Paola Barbato; Claudio Chiaverotti; Pasquale Ruju; Michele Medda; Alessandro Bilotta; Barbara Baraldi; Mauro Aragoni
- Artist(s): Angelo Stano; Bruno Brindisi; Corrado Roi; Claudio Castellini

Collected editions
- Dylan Dog Casefiles: ISBN 1-59582-206-2

Dylan Dog is an Italian horror comics series created by Tiziano Sclavi and published by Sergio Bonelli Editore since 1986.

The series features the eponymous character, a paranormal investigator who takes on cases involving supernatural elements such as ghosts, demons, vampires, undeads, werewolves and other creatures, but also horrifying sociopathic criminals and serial killers. It subverts the traditional horror genre with a vein of surrealism and an anti-bourgeois rhetoric. Dylan is supported mainly by his sidekick Groucho (a Groucho Marx lookalike) who adds humour to Dylan's sombre temperament. The series is primarily set in London where the protagonist lives, though he occasionally travels elsewhere.

Dark Horse Comics has published the English version of Dylan Dog in the United States in 1999, 2002 and 2009; a new edition was published by Epicenter Comics as of 2017. Sergio Bonelli Editore also released a limited English variant edition in 2018. The series has sold over 60 million copies worldwide, and is the second best-selling comic book in Italy after the Tex series, another publication by Sergio Bonelli Editore, with over 120,000 copies sold each month.

The film Cemetery Man (original title: Dellamorte Dellamore, 1994) starring Rupert Everett, was loosely based on the comics, but its main reference was Tiziano Sclavi's novel Dellamorte Dellamore. A direct American film adaptation, Dylan Dog: Dead of Night, starring Brandon Routh, was instead released in 2011, although it was significantly different from the source material. As of 2019, a television series based on the comics was also in development.

== Publication history ==
Dylan Dog was created by Tiziano Sclavi, a comics and novel writer, while the graphic representation of the character was elaborated mainly by Claudio Villa, who was its first cover artist too, taking the inspiration from the English actor Rupert Everett, as he saw in the movie Another Country. The character was named for poet Dylan Thomas, while his surname derives from "Dog figlio di...", the Italian title of Mickey Spillane's 1972 book "Erection Set", which was the provisional name Scalvi gave to his characters during the creation phase of his books before completing them.

Dylan Dog series debuted in October 1986 with a comic book entitled "L'alba dei morti viventi" ("Dawn of the Living Dead"), plotted and scripted by Tiziano Sclavi and illustrated by Angelo Stano; it proved to be a huge publishing success in the years to come. May 2003 saw the publication of Issue 200, entitled "Il numero duecento" ("The Number Two-Hundred"), plotted and scripted by Paola Barbato and drawn by Bruno Brindisi. In August 2011, the series has reached the number 300, entitled "Ritratto di famiglia" ("Family Portrait").

=== Annuals ===
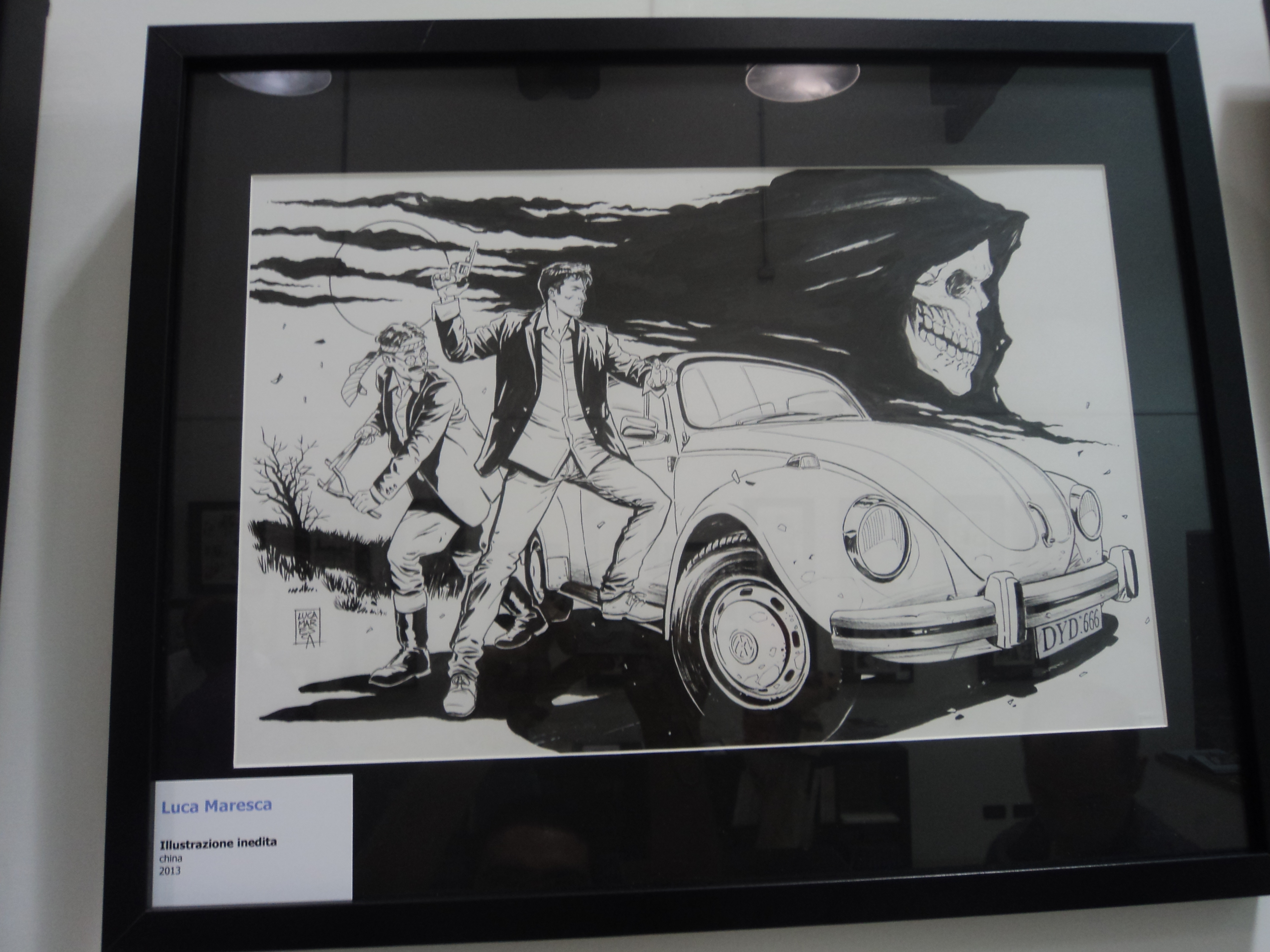
Dylan Dog alongside Groucho and his Beetle. Art by Luca Maresca.

In August 1987 a special annual release was added to the monthly series, called Numero Speciale (Special Issue), with one story longer than usual and, in addition, small extra books on various horror-related subjects.

Another annual release was added in March 1991, L'almanacco della paura ("The Almanac of Fear"): together with Dylan Dog stories, it includes articles and curiosities about film, literature, and other topics, all related to the horror theme.

January 1993 saw the appearance of a new annual book, the Dylan Dog Gigante ("Giant-Size Dylan Dog"), so called because it was much larger than the monthly book and because it contained more stories.

Dylan Dog maxi came out in July 1998. This was another annual release that collected together three previously unpublished stories.

=== Specials ===
In October 1990 an irregularly numbered issue came out: Dylan Dog e Martin Mystère – Ultima Fermata: l'incubo! (Dylan Dog and Martin Mystère – Last Stop: Nightmare!). It presented an unpublished story in which the nightmare investigator teamed up with another famous Bonelli character, Martin Mystère. Alfredo Castelli and Tiziano Sclavi wrote and plotted this story, and Angelo Stano did the drawings. The story had a sequel in 1992.

=== Reprints ===
The first reprint series came out in July 1990, the second in June 1991, and the third in June 1996, this time called Collezione Book (Collection Book); in October 2006 the bi-monthly reprint Grande ristampa was released.

February 1997 saw the release of the Super Book, a tri-monthly release that reprinted the special annual issues that had come out ten years before.

=== Dylan Dog Color Fest ===
In August 2007, a new annual was released. Containing 4 new stories, the new comic book was called "Dylan Dog Color Fest" because it contained only stories full colored and not black and white like the regular series. In 2010 it became bi-annual (coming out in April and August every year). By 2016, each album would contain 3 colored stories – even though some albums also contain one individual story – and it would get published each number every three months. In November 2018, the 27th album will be released.

== Colored issues ==
Dylan Dog (like all Sergio Bonelli comic books) is printed in black and white. However, there are some issues that came out full colored to celebrate certain anniversaries. These include numbers that are multiple of 100, decade anniversaries of the series and other rare occasions.

The first full colored issue was # 100, titled "La storia di Dylan Dog" ("The Story of Dylan Dog"), which told the final chapter of the adventure of Dylan. It was written by Tiziano Sclavi with drawings by Angel Stano. Color issue 121, "Finché morte non vi separi" (Till Death Do Us Part) celebrated the 10th birthday. Issue number 200 "Il Numero 200" ("The Number 200"), written by Paola Barbato with art by Bruno Brindisi, was also full colored and was the "sequel" of number 121 and the "prequel" of the very first issue ("Dawn of the Living Dead"). It tells what happened after Dylan's wife dies and how he became the "nightmare investigator". Issue 241 and 242 celebrated the 20th birthday of the series. Also in color was Sclavi and Brindisi's #250, "Ascensore per l'inferno" (literally "Elevator to Hell"). The next full colored issue would be #300, "Ritratto di famiglia" ("Family Picture"). Other coloured issues are number #131 "Quando cadono le stelle" ("When the Stars Fall", only final pages not in black and white), #224 "In nome del padre" (In Father's Name), #350 "Lacrime di pietra" ("Tears of Stone"), #361 "Mater Dolorosa" and #375 "Nel Mistero" ("To Mystery"), which celebrates the return of Tiziano Sclavi in writing the script.

The screaming bell at Dylan Dog's house. Indagatore dell'incubo is Italian for "Nightmare Investigator".

== Characterisation ==
Dylan Dog is a penniless "nightmare investigator" ("L'indagatore dell'incubo") who defies the whole preceding horror tradition with a vein of surrealism and an anti-bourgeois rhetoric.

His clothes are one of his defining characteristics: he always dresses the same way, in a red shirt, black jacket, and blue jeans; he bought twelve identical outfits after the death of his lover Lillie Connolly. Even during the worst weather, he never wears an overcoat or even carries an umbrella, since, according to him, an overcoat "would ruin his look", and he thinks that an umbrella is a "useless invention. Especially when it doesn't rain."

One of the principal supporting characters in the series is his assistant (or rather, comic relief), Groucho, a punning double of Groucho Marx. Another supporting character is Inspector Bloch, who was his superior when he worked at Scotland Yard and remains his father figure (in fact he calls Dylan "Old boy") even after Dylan struck out on his own to become a private investigator specializing in the supernatural.

Dylan lives with Groucho at 7 Craven Road in a cluttered apartment with a doorbell that screams. His hobbies include playing the clarinet (he only knows to play Devil's Trill, but plays it often) and constructing a model ship which he apparently never manages to finish; he has many phobias, including claustrophobia, fear of bats and acrophobia. Dylan is also particularly susceptible to motion sickness, which is one of the reasons why he rarely travels, and anyway never by plane. Once an alcoholic, he now never drinks. He is a vegetarian and animal rights supporter. Dylan cares little for many aspects of modern life. He hates cellphones and to record his memories, he still uses a feather-pen and an inkpot. Naturally, he loves literature (poetry in particular), music (his tastes range from classical to heavy metal), and horror films. Though perpetually penniless, he does not seem to be interested in money. In fact, the usual first piece of advice he gives to numerous clients who have found themselves in his study over the years is to go to a psychiatrist or psychologist. He does not believe in coincidences.

Dr. Xabaras is Dylan Dog's worst enemy.

He is also a hopeless romantic who loves and loses a new woman in nearly every issue. In fact, in a majority of his cases, his clients are women, with whom he often has a sexual relationship.

== Setting ==
The series is mainly set in London, where the protagonist lives, though he occasionally travels elsewhere, such as imaginary realms such as "La zona del crepuscolo" (Twilight Zone). His address is 7 Craven Road, London, in reference to director Wes Craven.

The Cafe at 7 Craven Road, Paddington, London, was renamed Cafe Dylan Dog in 2013. In 2012, the cafe offered "Dylan Dog Meal" with beef or pork included, even though Dylan himself is a vegetarian.

== Supporting characters ==
Groucho, Dylan's assistant, on the cover of a spin-off devoted to his solo surreal adventures.

- Inspector Bloch, Dylan's superior when he worked at Scotland Yard, remained his friend and father figure even after our hero quit the force. Bloch and Dylan often help out in each other's cases. Bloch is more rational and grounded than Dylan and often disregards supernatural explanations. He is an old but competent officer who dreams of retirement. Though Dylan causes enough trouble on his own, Bloch is also plagued by his hapless underling, Jenkins, whom he constantly threatens to sentence to a life of directing traffic. His graphic representation was inspired by English actor Robert Morley and is named for crime, horror and science fiction author Robert Bloch.
- Groucho was a Groucho Marx impersonator whose character became his permanent personality. Now he lives and works with Dylan Dog as his professional sidekick. Like his famous namesake, Groucho enjoys cracking puns and women, though he does not share his employer's luck with the ladies. Groucho's goofy, off-beat personality helps temper Dylan's moodiness. He also reminds his boss when their finances are in dire straits (almost always), shows up with a pistol in the nick of time and throws it in Dylan's hand right on time, and makes tea. At some point in every issue Groucho makes one or two jokes that annoy Dylan and the person listening to the joke (often a client of Dylan's). An example: "...once, I had a dog which could utter its own name. It was named Woof."
- Lord H.G Wells is an eccentric inventor who helps Dylan in some of his cases. Named after the author H. G. Wells.

== Crossovers ==
Some crossover stories combining Dylan Dog with characters from different comics were published, including, with Martin Mystere, Mister No, Ken Parker, Nathan Never, and Dampyr.

In October 2019, DC Comics and Sergio Bonelli Editori announced a crossover series between Dylan Dog and Batman. Issue #0 of the crossover, titled "Relazioni pericolose" ("Dangerous liaisons"), script by Roberto Recchioni with art by Gigi Cavenago and Werther Dell'Edera, was published in December 2019. As well as Batman, the series heavily features John Constantine. It was published in English by DC Comics on 12 March 2024.

== Cultural influence ==
Italian author Umberto Eco said: "I can read the Bible, Homer, or Dylan Dog for several days without being bored."

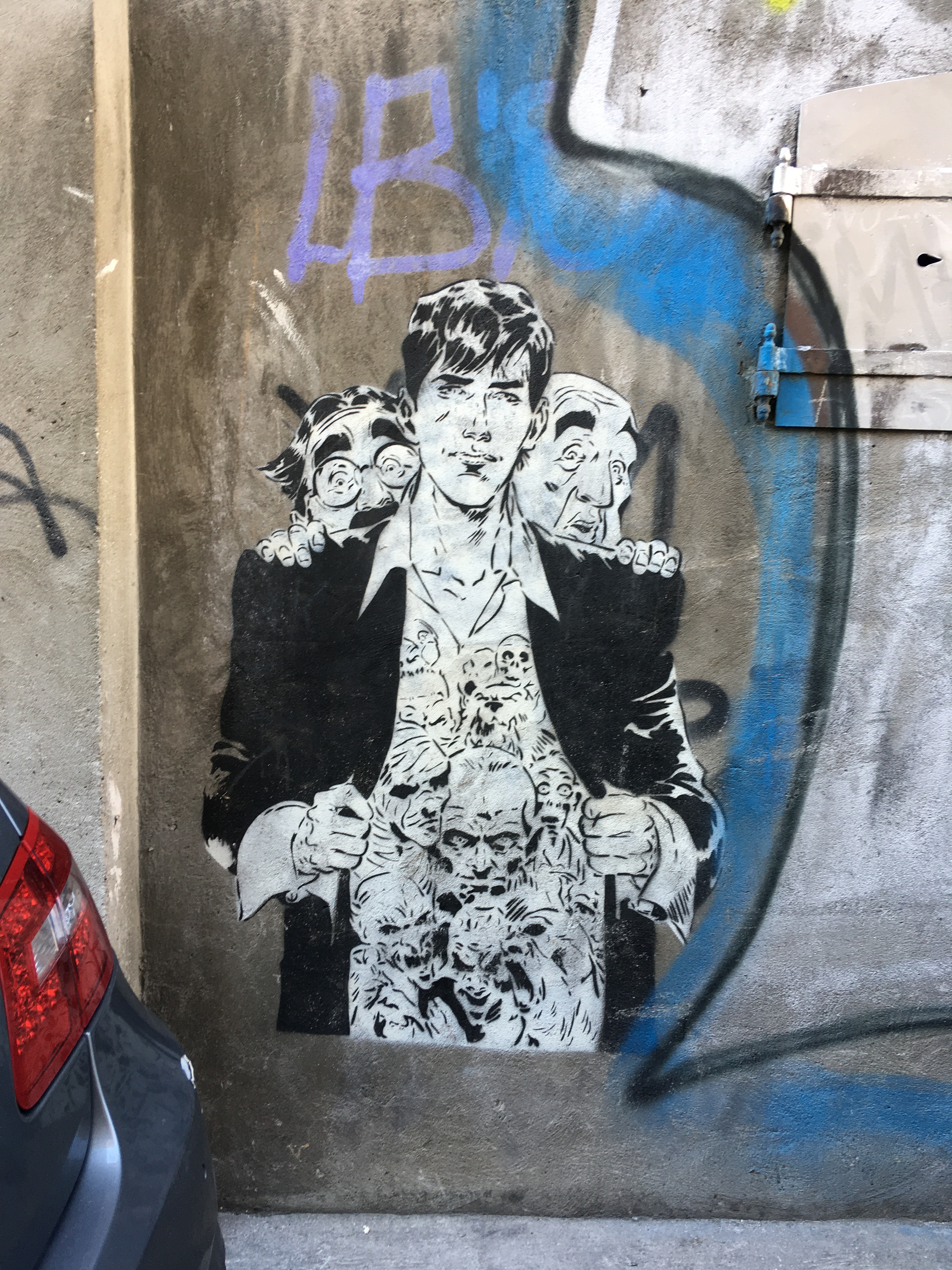
Dylan Dog stencil, Belgrade

== Sales ==
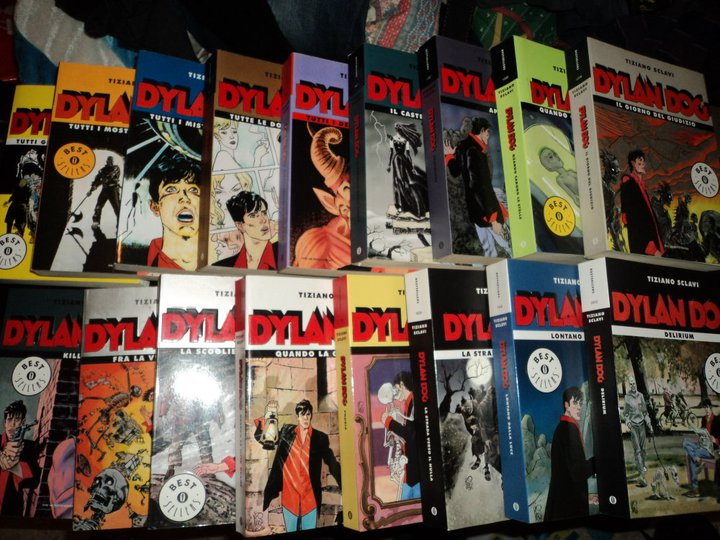
Some Dylan Dog stories re-published by Arnoldo Mondadori Editore

Dylan Dog is the second most widely sold comic book in Italy (the first one is another publication of Sergio Bonelli Editore, Tex): including both reprints and new stories, it sells over 120,000 copies each month. As of 2017, the series has sold over 60 million copies worldwide.

The series is also published in Croatia by Ludens, in Serbia by Veseli Četvrtak and Expik Publications, in North Macedonia by M-comics, in Denmark by Shadow Zone Media, in the Netherlands by Silvester, in Poland by Tore, in Spain by Aleta Ediciones, in Sweden by Ades Media, in Turkey by Rodeo and Hoz Comics, in Greece by Mamouth Comix, Jemma Press and Mikros Iros Publications and in Mexico by Panini Comics.

== English translation ==
American publisher Dark Horse Comics released an English translation of a selection of Dylan Dog stories in 1999. This six-issue miniseries was later completed by a one-shot released in 2002. To avoid legal complications regarding Groucho Marx's estate, the art was altered so that Groucho no longer sports the Marx brother's signature moustache, and was renamed "Felix". Every cover in the six-issue mini featured art by American comics artist Mike Mignola.

As of 2016, Epicenter Comics published a new English version of some Dylan Dog stories.

In 2018 and 2019, Sergio Bonelli Editore published a limited English variant edition. DC Comics published the Batman/Dylan Dog crossover series in March 2024.

=== Dark Horse ===
==== Six-Issue miniseries ====
- Dylan Dog No. 1 (March 1999) – Translated from "L'alba dei morti viventi" ("Dawn of the Living Dead"; Italian edition n°1, 1986)
- Dylan Dog No. 2 (April 1999) – Translated from "Johnny Freak" (Italian edition n°81, 1993)
- Dylan Dog No. 3 (late April 1999) – Translated from "Memorie dall'invisibile" ("Memories of an Invisible Man"; Italian edition n°19, 1988).
- Dylan Dog No. 4 (June 1999) – Translated from "il ritorno del mostro" ("The Monster Returns"; Italian edition n°8, 1987).
- Dylan Dog No. 5 (July 1999) – Translated from "Morgana" in (Italian edition n°25, 1988).
- Dylan Dog No. 6 (August 1999) – Translated from "Dopo mezzanotte" ("After Midnight"; Italian edition n°26, 1988).

==== One-shot ====
- Dylan Dog : Zed (November 2002) – Translated from "Zed" (Italian edition n° 84)

==== Collected edition ====
A 680-page volume, Dylan Dog Casefiles, was released in 2009 (ISBN 1595822062), to tie in with the movie Dylan Dog: Dead of Night. It reprinted the seven stories Dark Horse previously released. This volume also includes cover art by Mike Mignola.

=== Epicenter Comics ===
- Dylan Dog: Mater Morbi (July 2016)
- Dylan Dog: Mater Dolorosa (November 2017)
- Dylan Dog: The Long Goodbye (May 2018)
- Dylan Dog: Chess of Death (October 2018)

=== Bonelli's variant edition ===
- Dylan Dog: Dawn of the Living Dead (November 2018)
- Dylan Dog: After Midnight (November 2018)
- Dylan Dog: The Ghost of Anna Never (March 2019)
- Dylan Dog: Through the Looking-Glass (March 2019)

=== DC Comics ===
- Batman/Dylan Dog #1 (12 March 2024)
- Batman/Dylan Dog #2 (9 April 2024)
- Batman/Dylan Dog #3 (4 May 2024)

== Covers ==
The covers of the first 41 issues are by Claudio Villa, those of issues 42 to 361 were created by Angelo Stano. No. 362 had a completely white cover, therefore without an illustrator, while from issue 363 they are by Gigi Cavenago with the exception of issues no. 418-419-420 in which the front cover is by Fabrizio De Tommaso and the back cover is by Gigi Cavenago. From no. 421 the covers are entrusted to illustrators Gianluca and Raul Cestaro.

== Awards ==
- 2000: Nominated for the "Favourite comic" Eagle Award
- 2008: Nominated for the "Favourite European Comics" Eagle Award
- 2012: "Favourite European Comics" – Winner Eagle Award

== Adaptations ==
=== Films ===
==== Cemetery Man ====
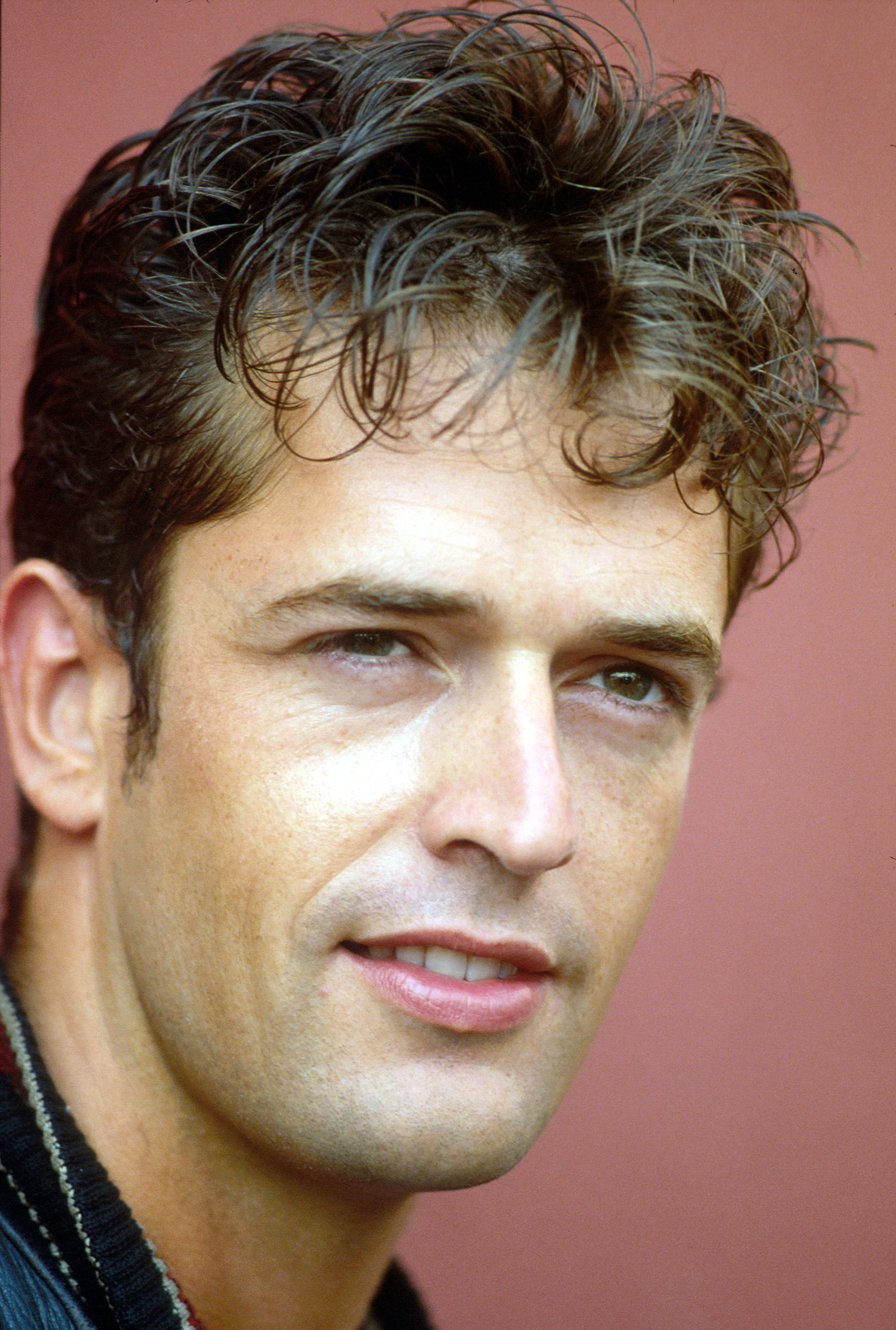
Rupert Everett

In 1994 Italian director Michele Soavi directed the film Dellamorte Dellamore (known abroad as Cemetery Man or Of Death and Love), with a screenplay written by Giovanni Romoli and based on Tiziano Sclavi's similarly titled novel. Francesco Dellamorte (his mother's surname was Dellamore) – a sort of Italian alter ego for Dylan Dog – appears for the first time in the third special issue of Dylan Dog, Orrore nero (Black Horror), released July 1989, in which he met the Nightmare Detective, but Sclavi's novel was written before the special issue.

Francesco Dellamorte also appears in a short (comic book) sequel to Orrore nero, entitled Stelle cadenti (Falling stars), where Dylan, Groucho, Francesco and Gnaghi are walking together during saint Lawrence's night, watching shooting stars and talking about life and death.

English actor Rupert Everett, who inspired Dylan Dog's design, played the protagonist, Francesco Dellamorte, while Italian model and actress Anna Falchi played the female lead. Although having Everett in the main role, the Dylan Dog character did not appear in the movie.

==== Dylan Dog: Dead of Night ====
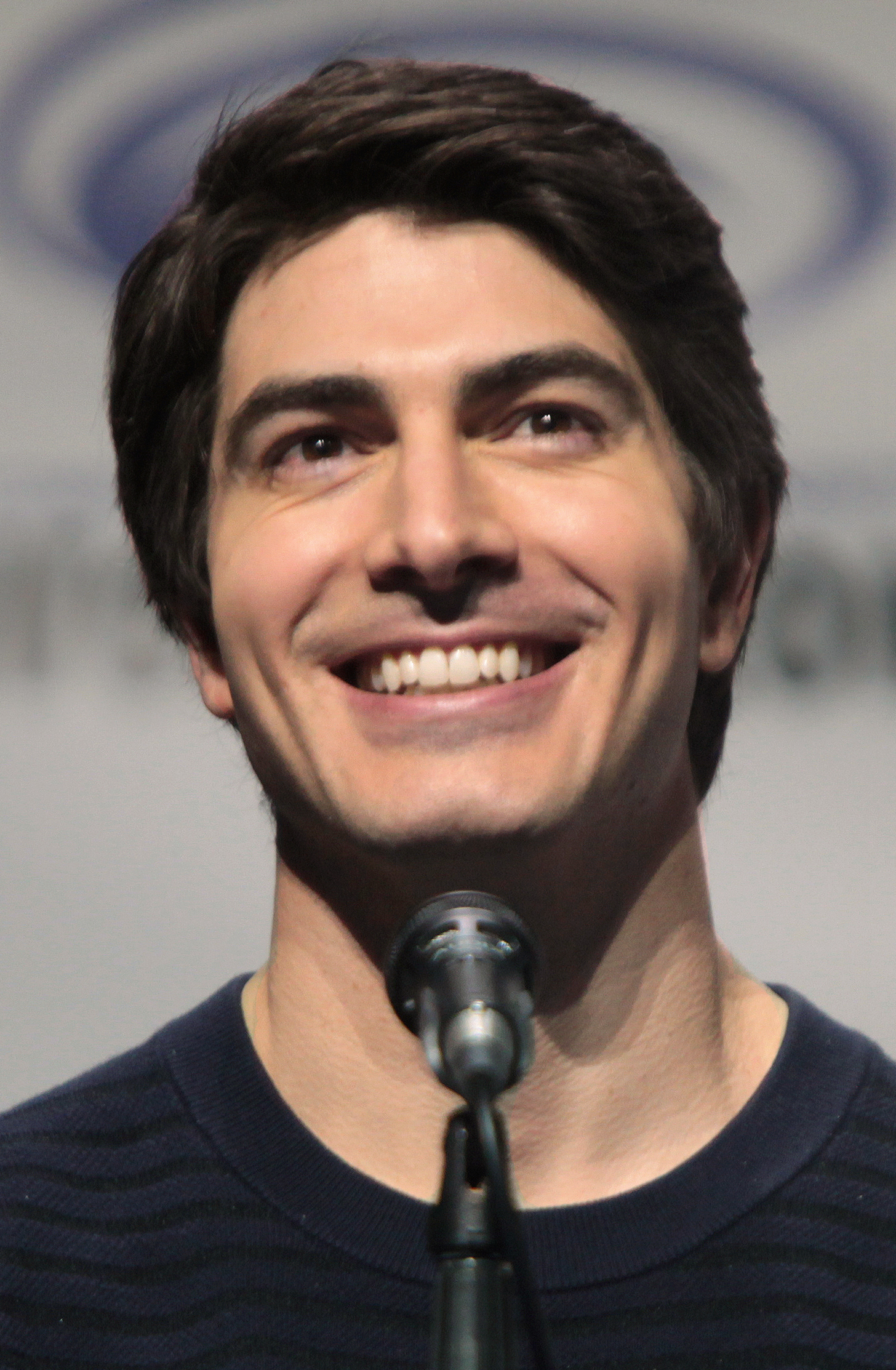
Brandon Routh

Kevin Munroe directed Dylan Dog: Dead of Night, an official American film adaptation of Dylan Dog starring actor Brandon Routh as the title character.

The film was originally going to premiere on Halloween 2010 in Italy but was later pushed back to a 29 April 2011 release. It was produced by the independent company Platinum Studios. The film received negative reviews from critics, and was a box-office bomb after grossing just $5.8 million on a $20 million budget. On review aggregate website Rotten Tomatoes, the film holds an approval rating of 5% based on 44 reviews, with an average rating of 3.43/10. The website's critics consensus called the film "an uninspired, feebly-acted horror/comedy that produces little scares and laughs." Italian critics, with more connection to the original comics, were slightly kinder to the film.

The film adaptation differs significantly from the original comic series. It relocates the setting from London to New Orleans, and replaces the character of Groucho with an undead sidekick named Marcus, due to the production’s inability to obtain the rights to use the Groucho Marx name and likeness. Dylan Dog's Volkswagen Beetle is depicted as black with a white hood, the reverse of its appearance in the comics. The film adopts a lighter tone and a more action-oriented style, omitting much of the comic’s surreal atmosphere, black humor, and underlying melancholy. The protagonist is reimagined as a scientist-adventurer reminiscent of Indiana Jones, rather than the romantic loner of the original series, and his physical portrayal is that of a muscular action hero rather than the slender figure seen in the comics.

=== Television series ===
A television series based on the comics, produced by James Wan and his production company Atomic Monster, was announced by Sergio Bonelli Editore in August 2018. In December 2022, Wan stated that the series was still in development, and that he was also working with the publishing house to find investors. On 2 June 2023, Michele Masiero, editorial director of Sergio Bonelli Editore, said that the series will be faithful to the comics, and that they were preparing the casting.

=== Video games ===
Dylan Dog has featured in a number of video games across various formats including:

- Dylan Dog: The Murderers (Gli Uccisori) - 1992 - Amiga and Commodore 64
- Dylan Dog: Through the Looking Glass - 1993 - Amiga

== See also ==
- Dylan Dog Books out of series
