= Martin Mystère =

Italian comic book series

Cover of Martin Mystère #315, featuring the title character and Java

Martin Mystère is an Italian comic book whose protagonist is Martin Mystère. Created by writer Alfredo Castelli and artist Giancarlo Alessandrini, it was first published in Italy by Sergio Bonelli Editore in 1982.

Dark Horse Comics has published the English version of the series in the United States. It is still published in Italy and has been translated in many other languages, sometimes with the name changed (e.g., in Germany, the series is named Alan Dark; in the United States, Martin Mystery; in Croatia, Martin Mystery/Martin Mystère; in Serbia, Marti Misterija; in Turkey, Atlantis; and in Tamil Nadu, Marma Manithan Martin).

The series is one of Bonelli's most popular comic books in Italy, selling over 20,000 copies each month. It has been adapted to various other media, such as an animated television series, video games, and books.

== Overview ==
Martin Mystère is an art historian, archaeologist, anthropologist, adventurer, writer, television producer and collector of unusual objects. Based in New York City, where he was born Martin Jacques Mystère, he spent much of his early life studying in Italy, where many of his adventures take place. After the unexplained deaths of his parents in a plane crash (1965), he started to devote his studies to the most enigmatic events and places of human history. He also helps the New York police and a United States secret government agency in their investigations, as well as anyone who comes to him for help and gets him curious. He is assisted in his adventures all around the world by Java, a mute and very strong Neanderthal man he discovered in the hidden City of Lucid Shadows in Mongolia.

== Characters ==
Java is Martin's closest friend and helper. He is a Neanderthal man found in a lost city of Neanderthals. He adapted to modern life. In the early series, he mostly followed or found people or things with his instinct or animallike sense of smell; later, he became more normal but lost effect on the stories. Now he mostly follows Martin everywhere, protects and helps him.

Martin Mystère's main opponents include the Men in Black, the controversial art patron Sergej Orloff and Mr. Jinx.

Two other antagonists of the series are Loki and Morgan Le Fay.

His companion is Diana Lombard, who is also his long-time fiancée, later his wife. Mystère is not a womanizer, but he has not always been faithful to Diana either. Diana is a social worker, angry with Martin because he often travels without letting her know in advance and he is surrounded by beautiful women.

Together with Sergej Orloff, he was educated by the guru Kut-Humi. Sergej and Martin were friends and after their education they received the weapons called Murchadna (ancient ray-guns from the lost Mu). However, their friendship ended after Sergej chose the evil path; his weapon can kill whereas Martin's Murchadna can only make the target faint when blasted. Murchadna lost its power later, but showed up a few times more.

The Men in Black are a secret group spreading over the whole world and their aim is to prevent people from learning the true history of the world. The group was founded by Adam--an Atlantean agent--after the great war between Atlantis and Mu. The main aim of the group was to protect mankind from such disasters. After centuries, the organization became corrupt and endeavored to keep the true history of man unknown. The group destroyed all traces of Atlantis and Mu to maintain "world order" (in line with schoolbook history).

Another secret group called "Elsewhere" is a United States secret government agency. This group was founded by Thomas Jefferson. Their aim is to save mankind and collect and hide secret and marvellous things. Sometimes they fight The Men in Black, but sometimes they work together. The main contrast between them and The Men in Black is, they don't destroy fantastic objects and beings. They protect and hide them, until mankind is ready to learn.

Kut-Humi is a wise man who has a relationship to Agarthi, which is "a city both in this world and not" (this can be explained as being a utopic city). He has taught Martin and Sergej on spiritual issues. He shows up when needed and guides Martin.

== Universe ==
In the true history of the world (according to the comic Before The Great Flood), two major civilizations emerged on two different continents, named Mu (a pseudo-Asiatic realm ruled by an authoritarian, collectivistic philosophy) and Atlantis (a proto-Aryan regime devoted to individualism and capitalism); despite their ideological differences, both had developed advanced civilizations, comparable to the 'Eighties' ideas of an early 21st century. As a result of their rivalry, a great war flared up after several proxy conflicts fought over Gondwana, which ultimately saw the employment of nuclear warheads and other final weapons; in the end the losing side triggered a doomsday machine, which plunged the world in a veritable cataclysm, destroying nearly every sign of the antediluvian civilization.

The Atlantis-Mu overarching storyline was very poignant in the early 1980s, when the comic was born, as the antediluvian holocaust represented a warning to mankind (then enveloped in the last throes of the USA-USSR arms race); it gradually lost importance during the nineties.

Martin Mystère exists in the same fictional universe with other Sergio Bonelli comics characters, including Zagor (which, in recent years, has continued, in its stories, the plot relating to the clash between the two ancient civilisations), Mister No and Dylan Dog, a universe which would eventually evolve into the science-fiction milieu of Nathan Never.

Also Martin meets Peter Pan in London. Peter explains the truth about Neverland. Neverland is located in the heart of London, the Lost Boys are late 18th-century British students influenced by the French Revolution and Captain Hook is an 18th-century pirate who rules Neverland with an iron fist. He and his crew came to Neverland during the late 1790s. Peter Pan is a student who was turned into a flying boy, after he discovered an ancient temple of Green Man which remained from ancient Celts. Also Tinker Bell is the fairy guardian of the temple.

Martin meets Merlin in Stonehenge and also visits Avalon and Tír na nÓg.

== Adaptations ==
=== TV series ===
The animated television series Martin Mystery (2003–2006) is very loosely based on Martin Mystère. It re-imagines the comic books' main characters Martin and Diana as 16-year-old step-siblings attending Torrington Academy, a high school in Sherbrooke, Quebec. They work for a covert organization known as "The Center", which covertly protects the people of Earth from supernatural threats.

On October 10, 2023, it was announced a new animated series is currently in the works.

=== Video games ===
A video game, also, was patterned on the comic series, Martin Mystère: Operation Dorian Gray, and a role-playing game was published (an offshoot of Dylan Dog as an RPG).

A video game based on the animated series, titled Martin Mystery: Monster Invasion, was produced by Ubisoft and released for Nintendo DS in 2008.
