= Nick Raider =

Comics character

- Cover to Nick Raider #29

Publication information
- Publisher: Sergio Bonelli Editore
- Publication date: June 1988 – January 2005
- Main character(s): Nick Raider

Creative team
- Created by: Claudio Nizzi, Giampiero Casertano
- Written by: Claudio Nizzi
- Artist(s): Giampiero Casertano

Nick Raider is a fictional comic detective whose series was published from 1988 to 2005 by Sergio Bonelli Editore in Italy. Graphically inspired by the American actor Robert Mitchum, it was created by writer Claudio Nizzi and artist Giampiero Casertano. His partner Marvin Brown was inspired by Eddie Murphy. Nick Raider's stories are set in New York City.

Writers who worked on the regular series include Gianfranco Manfredi, Stefano Piani, Tito Faraci and Gino D'Antonio; artists include Gustavo Trigo, Ivo Milazzo, Ferdinando Tacconi, Sergio Toppi and Luigi Siniscalchi.

In 2006, IF Edizioni published a 4-issue Nick Raider miniseries, also written by Nizzi.

In India, Prakash Publishers regularly feature the Nick Raider stories in their Tamil Comics brand, Muthu Comics starting from 1990s. He is christened as Detective Robin in their storylines.
