= Gianfranco Manfredi =

Italian singer-songwriter, writer and actor (1948–2025)

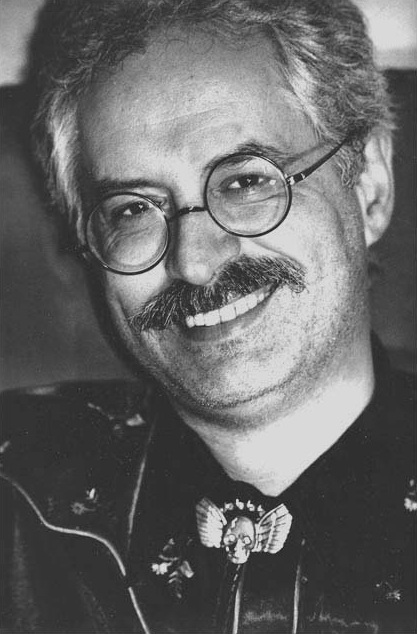
- Manfredi in 1993
- Born: 26 November 1948; Senigallia, Italy
- Died: 24 January 2025 (aged 76); Senigallia, Italy
- Resting place: Campo Verano, Italy
- Education: University of Milan
- Occupations: Singer-songwriter, composer, author, screenwriter, actor, cartoonist
- Awards: U Giancu's Prize, 2008

Gianfranco Manfredi (26 November 1948 – 24 January 2025) was an Italian singer-songwriter, composer, author, screenwriter, actor and cartoonist.

== Life and career ==
Born in Senigallia, Manfredi graduated in History of Philosophy at the University of Milan with a thesis on Jean-Jacques Rousseau.

Manfredi debuted as a singer-songwriter in 1972 with La crisi, an album filled with political and social themes. In 1973, he started working at the Italian Institute of History of Philosophy. Since 1974 he was also active as a songwriter for other artists, including Mia Martini, Mina, PFM, Wess & Dori Ghezzi, Drupi, Heather Parisi, Donatello.

Starting from the early 1980s, Manfredi almost completely abandoned music to focus on writing. He then published over a dozen novels and short stories, collaborated in various roles in several films, TV series, and plays, and created several comic series. He was also active as a musical critic and wrote essays on Adriano Celentano, Lucio Battisti, Enzo Jannacci and other Italian music artists.

Manfredi lived with his wife, Mirella, in Italy. His first daughter Diana Manfredi is a film director. He died on 24 January 2025, at the age of 76.

== Discography ==
Album

- 1972 – La crisi
- 1976 – Ma non è una malattia
- 1977 – Zombie di tutto il mondo unitevi
- 1978 – Biberon
- 1981 – Gianfranco Manfredi
- 1985 – Dodici (with Ricky Gianco)
- 1993 – In paradiso fa troppo caldo

== Novels ==
- Magia rossa, Milan, Feltrinelli, 1983. ISBN 88-07-04001-8; Rome, Gargoyle, 2006. ISBN 88-89541-12-1.
- Cromantica, Milan, Feltrinelli, 1985. ISBN 88-07-04007-7; Milan, Tropea, 2008. ISBN 978-88-558-0039-6.
- Ultimi vampiri, Milan, Feltrinelli, 1987. ISBN 88-07-01342-8; extended version, Rome, Gargoyle, 2009. ISBN 978-88-89541-35-7.
- Trainspotter, Milan, Feltrinelli, 1989. ISBN 88-07-01393-2.
- Il peggio deve venire, Milan, Mondadori, 1992. ISBN 88-04-35930-7.
- La fuga del cavallo morto, Milan, Anabasi, 1993. ISBN 88-417-3016-1.
- Una fortuna d'annata, Milan, Tropea, 2000. ISBN 88-438-0135-X.
- Il piccolo diavolo nero, Milan, Tropea, 2001. ISBN 88-438-0256-9.
- Nelle tenebre mi apparve Gesù, Milan, Tropea, 2005. ISBN 88-438-0500-2.
- Ho Freddo, Rome, Gargoyle, 2008. ISBN 978-88-89541-25-8.
- Tecniche di resurrezione, Rome, Gargoyle, 2010. ISBN 978-88-89541-51-7.
- La freccia verde, Milan, Mondadori, 2013. ISBN 978-88-04-62464-6.
