= International Cartoonists Exhibition =

Italian comics festival

Rapalloonia — International Cartoonists Exhibition Mostra Internazionale dei Cartoonists di Rapallo
- Status: Active
- Genre: Comics
- Frequency: Annual
- Venue: Villa Queirolo
- Location: Rapallo
- Country: Italy
- Years active: 1972–present
- Inaugurated: 1972; 54 years ago
- Founder: Carlo Chendi, Luciano Bottaro, Giorgio Rebuffi
- Most recent: Sept. 30, 2023 to Oct. 8, 2023
- Leader: Daniele Busnelli
- Organizer: Associazione Culturale Rapalloonia
- Website: www.facebook.com/rapalloonia

The International Cartoonists Exhibition, known familiarly as Rapalloonia, is an annual comics festival held in Rapallo, Liguria, Italy.

Founded in 1972, Rapalloonia is one of the oldest Italian exhibitions devoted to comics. Conceived in order to popularize and increase the importance of work done by comic authors, it was the first exhibition of its kind to display original artwork. It is one of the few comics festivals to have been founded and always directed by professional authors of the field — Carlo Chendi, Luciano Bottaro, and Giorgio Rebuffi. Other collaborators include the restaurateur Fausto Oneto, the artistic director Giovanni Nahmias and the association president Daniele Busnelli Since 1993, the festival has awarded U Giancu's Prize, given to a selection of accomplished comics creators.

Rapalloonia has not only been held in Rapallo, having traveled over the years and collaborated with other comics festivals in other places. The exhibition has twice moved to the site of Lucca Comics & Games and has collaborated with Strisce d'Africa ("Comic Strips of Africa"), dedicated to the European and American cartoons stories set in Africa and to those created by indigenous authors. The show has also collaborated in Venice with Venezia nel Fumetto ("Venice in comics").

For each exhibition, Rapalloonia produces catalogs/monographic publications based on that year's theme. The catalogs are between 70 and 120 pages in length, with large pages, either in color or black-and-white.

== Associazione Culturale Rapalloonia ==
Associazione Culturale Rapalloonia is a cultural association which pursues the promotion of comics, cartoons and related art forms, through channels of information and culture. The arms of Rapalloonia! were designed by the musician and actor Luigi Maio. Carlo Chendi, one of the association's founders, became honorary president in 2014, succeeded as president by Davide Caci. Rapalloonia! works with partners to promote comics as a form of expression and means of communication. Some of these non-profit organizations include Comune di Rapallo, Regione Liguria, Provincia di Genova and UNICEF.

== History ==
The International Cartoonists Exhibition was formed by Carlo Chendi (1933–2021), an Italian cartoonist and Disney Italy screenwriter, and the cartoonists Luciano Bottaro (1931–2006) and Giorgio Rebuffi (1928–2014), who founded Studio Bierreci. It was originally dedicated to two main categories: cartoonists and readers. The aim of the festival was to show how a comic page is born, illuminating the processes by which pictures are drawn by hand before being photographed and downsized, ready for print. The first exhibition, in 1972, showed the work of cartoonists from eight different countries. As with the 1973 show, no particular theme was selected for exhibition.

The 1974 exhibition, however, was given to the subject of women in comics, both as main characters and as authors. This show was an enormous success, drawing attention from the mass media. Special guests Oriana Fallaci and Natalia Aspesi wrote articles in their respective newspapers, and RAI (Italy's national public broadcasting company) reported on the exhibition on national television.

Later shows continued similarly, with various themes being chosen for the exhibition. One was dedicated to Corriere dei Piccoli; two to publishing house (Edizioni Alpe and Edizioni Bianconi), two to Cristoforo Colombo; three to comic schools: the Connecticut School (Mort Walker, Dik Browne and many others) and to Italian schools Strisce di Terra ("Strips of Earth") and Strisce di Mare ("Strips of the Sea"); one to the cartoon heroes of the western world; one to satire; one to the topic of Christmas, made in Milan and Rapallo, connected to fundraising for the charity Francesca Rava N.P.H. that helps children of Haiti and of other Caribbean countries; five dedicated to famous characters: Martin Mystère, Ken Parker, Paperinik, Julia, and Dylan Dog; two to the sea: Nuvole d’acqua salata ("Clouds of saltwater") and Mare a strisce ("Sea of comic strips"); one to Magie e Incantesimi ("Spells and Enchantments"); one to W.I.T.C.H.; and one to the music, with the title Note a fumetti (loosely "music to comics"). Finally, six shows were dedicated to different authors: Luciano Bottaro, Ivo Milazzo, Silver, Ro Marcenaro, and Carl Barks. For the first time, one was dedicated to Idee e Creatività ("ideas and creativity"), to demonstrate that without an idea, story, or screenplay, cartoons cannot exist: the four writers celebrated were Tiziano Sclavi, Giancarlo Berardi, Carlo Chendi, and François Corteggiani.

The 2022 edition celebrated the 50th anniversary of Rapalloonia. The 2023 edition, held 30 September to 8 October 2023, celebrated 30 years of the U Giancu Prize.

=== Editions ===
Exhibitions over the years have had different themes: below are the most appreciated and remembered editions:

2005

The 33rd edition of Rappoloonia was dedicated to Carl Barks: international guests included the Carl Barks Fan Club and Don Rosa, the natural heir of Barks.

2006

The 34th edition was held in November 2006, and it had as theme Comics Schools, in which the main Italian and foreign comics schools participated.

2010

The 38th edition, held from September 25 to October 10, 2010, was dedicated to women in comics. The focus was on the fictional criminologist Julia Kendall, created by Giancarlo Berardi, creator of the famous Ken Parker. Julia, who aesthetically resembles Audrey Hepburn, lives and works in Garden City, a fictional American metropolis. She is a criminology teacher at Hollyhock University but often assists the police with investigations that require her expertise. Given the importance of the theme, a debate on women was organized, including a lesson on stalkers, a real issue affecting women. For the first time, the Rapalloonia Prize was awarded to someone outside the comics world: Alessandra Bucci, the deputy superintendent of state police and head of the Homicide police headquarters in Genoa, for her parallel life with Julia.

2011

The 39th edition, held from October 1 to 16, 2011, was marked by a sad event: the death of Sergio Bonelli shortly before the exhibition. Bonelli was the editor of Dylan Dog and Tex Willer from 1986, originally created by his father, Gian Luigi Bonelli. This edition also paid tribute to Sergio Cofferati, former secretary of CGIL and current MEP, with a contribution to his literature. The exhibition concluded with a press review in honor of Bonelli, and it was named Happy Birthday, Dylan Dog after the main character of the horror comic Dylan Dog. Created by writer Tiziano Sclavi and inspired by actor Rupert Everett, Dylan Dog's stories are set in London, where he lives at 7 Craven Road.

In his career, Bonelli inherited Tex from his father, started Dylan Dog, and created two characters: Zagor and Mister No. Zagor is similar to Tarzan, featuring elements such as the West, mysterious forests, Indians, and wilderness; while Mister No shares Bonelli's traits as an avid traveler and dreamer, a Yankee who said no to war and progress, siding with the weak.

2012

The 40th edition, held from November 10 to 25, 2012, was one of the most significant. Despite a weather alert during that period, the opening day took place at the Teatro Auditorium delle Clarisse, with a special presentation by Rudy Zerbi and Luigi Maio, and the screening of a documentary by Giancarlo Sordi in memory of Sergio Bonelli, who had died a year earlier. The documentary was titled Come Tex nessuno mai. The significance of that edition didn't end there. It marked the 40th anniversary of the exhibition with displays of original drawings and classic comics from the first edition. It also celebrated 20 years of the perfect union between cartoons and the cuisine of restaurateur Fausto Oneto (U Giancu), 30 years of Martin Mystère, the "detective of the impossible" created by Alfredo Castelli, and 60 years of Carlo Chendi's career, featuring his works on Mickey Mouse, Donald Duck, and Pepito. During the exhibition, an important announcement was made: the city decided to honor Chendi's memory by naming a street or square after Walt Disney. Cartoons thus became part of Rapallo's place names, and the Rapallo castle was renamed Paperopoli. This edition of the exhibition was aptly named the Cartoonist's Celebration edition.

November 30 was a special day, as Carlo Chendi worked as a professor for a day. The exhibition and the teachers of the Chiavari School of Cartoons collaborated on a project. In local secondary schools, students were paired with some of Italy's most popular artists to explain how a comics story is created, from its initial idea to publication. For example, Egle Bartolini, the designer of Titti and Silvestro, participated. All these events aimed to continue the tradition in Rapallo, which is considered the capital of cartoons.

2014

The 42nd edition, held from September 27 to October 19, 2014, was named Sportoonia and was dedicated to sport. The main theme was the relationship between art and sport, which was not a random choice, as Rapallo was the European City of Sport that year. Additionally, sports activities are as integral to comics as they are to everyday life. For the first time, the exhibition included manga, since Japanese cartoons prominently feature sports themes, exemplified by titles such as Holly and Benji and Mila and Shiro.

2017

The 2017 edition, held September 30 to October 8, featured such guests as Alessandro Bilotta, Giuseppe Camuncoli, Mirka Andolfo, Corrado Mastantuono, Carmine Di Giandomenico, Enrico Marini, and Riccardo Burchielli.

2022

The COVID-19 pandemic prevented Rapalloonia from happening in 2019, 2020, and 2021; the festival returned in 2022 (from Oct. 1 to Oct 9) to celebrate its 50th anniversary. That year's exhibition was known as "A World of Comics – The Incredible Adventure of the Bierrecì Group."

== U Giancu's Prize ==
The annual awarding of U Giancu's Prize is closely tied to the International Cartoonists Exhibition, taking place on the same day as the exhibition's opening, though in a different location (the U Giancu restaurant). Cartoonists, authors, comedians, editors, actors, and fans gather for a big dinner at U Giancu, which resembles a cartoon museum. Every year, they eat, drink, laugh, draw, and chat late into the night, celebrating the U Giancu Prize.

U Giancu's Prize was created in the autumn of 1992. The name "U Giancu" comes from the restaurant where several people had gathered that night: Fausto Oneto, the owner of the restaurant U Giancu; his wife; Italian comics creator Luciano Bottaro; Bottaro's friend Piero Campana, who had historically assisted at the restaurant; and Claudio Bertieri. During their gathering, Bertieri proposed the idea of celebrating their mutual friend, the cartoonist Antonio Canale, who had died a few months earlier. They contacted Emanuele Luzzati, an Italian animator and illustrator, and asked him to create a small statue. Luzzati created The White Pulcinella, which became the symbol of the prize. (The term "U Giancu" is Genoese dialect for "the white.") To complete the work, Oneto decided to have the statue placed in an elegant olive wooden box.

In the beginning, the prize was given only to a realistic/adventure artist and to a humor artist: the first prize-winners were Aurelio Galleppini and Francesco Tullio Altan. When Chendi returned to Rapallo in 1996, he asked Oneto to associate the Prize with the exhibition, to move the famous cartoonists dinner from Wednesday to Saturday, and to also award a prize to a scriptwriter. As a result, in 1996, the first writer to win the prize was Sergio Bonelli for his stories of Zagor, Mister No, and Tex Willer. As a result, from 1996 to 2014, the U Giancu Prize was awarded annually to three individuals: a comic cartoonist, a writer, and an realistic/adventure cartoonist.

Special U Giancu's Prizes awarded in 2005 (to Umberto Virri), 2006 (to Paul Karasik), 2007 (to Maurizio Mantero and Valentina De Poli), 2008 (to Stefano Goria), 2009 (to Roberto Genovesi), and 2012 (to Alfredo Castelli).

In 2015, U Giancu's Prize was revised to reflect four categories: Writer, Humor Artist, Lifetime Achievement, and Promising Italian Talent (the last one known as the PaChenTo Prize).

There were no U Giancu's Prizes awarded in 2019, 2020, or 2021.

The 2023 Rapalloonia festival saw a celebration of 30 years of U Giancu's Prize.

=== U Giancu's Prize winners ===
YEAR	Writer	Realistic/Adventure artist	Humor artist
1993	N/A	Aurelio Galleppini	Francesco Tullio Altan
1994	N/A	Hugo Pratt	Guillermo Mordillo
1995	N/A	Milo Manara	Luciano Bottaro
1996	Sergio Bonelli	Jean Giraud	Benito Jacovitti
1997	Giancarlo Berardi	Paolo Eleuteri Serpieri	Quino
1998	Alfredo Castelli	Hermann Huppen	Silver
1999	François Corteggiani	Ivo Milazzo	Giorgio Cavazzano
2000	Tiziano Sclavi	Vittorio Giardino	Silvia Ziche
2001	Carlo Chendi	Sergio Toppi	Leonardo Ortolani
2002	Claudio Nizzi	Giancarlo Alessandrini	Corrado Mastantuono
2003	Tito Faraci	Angelo Stano	Ro Marcenaro
2004	Francesco Artibani	Alfonso Font	Sergio Staino
2005	Mauro Boselli	Carlo Ambrosini	Don Rosa
2006	Maurizio Nichetti	Fabio Celoni	Enrico Macchiavello
2007	Mario Gomboli	Giorgio Trevisan	Massimo Bonfatti
2008	Gianfranco Manfredi	Laura Zuccheri	Donald Soffritti
2009	Paola Barbato	Lorenzo Mattotti	Roberto Santillo
2010	Bruno Enna	José Antonio Muñoz	Massimo De Vita
2011	Pasquale Ruju	Bruno Brindisi	Bruno Bozzetto
2012	Antonio Serra	Massimo Giacon	Paolo Bacilieri
2013	Daniele Brolli	Igort	Andrea Freccero
2014	Claudio Chiaverotti	Gipi	Sandro Dossi

YEAR	Writer	Humor Artist	Lifetime Achievement	Promising Italian Talent
2015	Roberto Racchioni	Emiliano Mammucari	Mirka Andolfo	Sio
2016	Luigi Cavenago	Moreno Burattini	Daniele Caluri	Matteo De Longis
2017	Alessandro Bilotta	Federico Bertolucci	Giuseppe Camuncoli	Greta Xella
2018	Mino Milani	Claudio Sciarrone	Manuele Fior	Stefano Zanchi
2022	Giampiero Casertano	Stefano Turconi	Teresa Radice	Eli 2B
2023	Davide Barzi	Francesco D'Ippolito	Barbara Canepa	Yi Yang

== See also ==
- Lucca Comics & Games
- Yellow Kid Award
- Angoulême International Comics Festival
