= Laura Zuccheri =

Italian comic artist, illustrator and painter (born 1971)

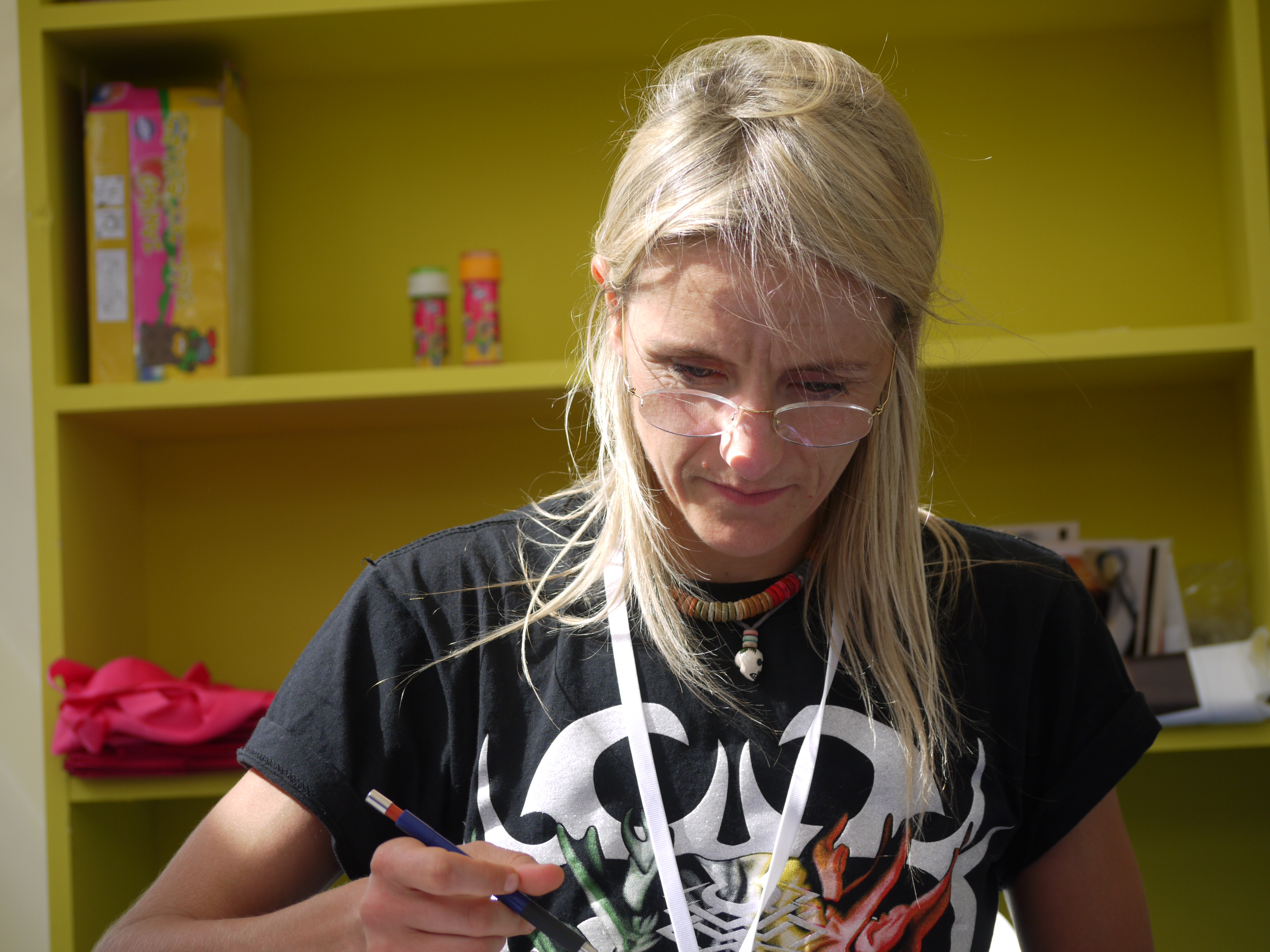
- Laura Zuccheri at the O Tour de la Bulle comics festival (Montpellier, 2019)
- Born: 4 October 1971 (age 55) Budrio, Bologna, Italy
- Areas: cartoonist; illustrator; painter
- Notable works: Ken Parker; Julia; Tex
- Awards: Gran Guinigi Award; U Giancu's Prize

Laura Zuccheri (born 4 October 1971) is an Italian comics artist, illustrator, and painter.

== Biography ==
Laura Zuccheri is the daughter of former basketball player and coach, Ettore Zuccheri.

She is a self-taught artist and debuted her work in 1992 in the Ken Parker Magazine by Giancarlo Berardi and Ivo Milazzo, which in 1993, was acquired by Sergio Bonelli Editore. In 1994, she drew, together with her colleague Pasquale Frisenda, the Ken Parker western adventure titled "I condannati", with a script by Giancarlo Berardi and Maurizio Mantero. In 1996, she made "Hardware", a comic published in Zona X. The following year, she entered the team of the detective comic, Julia-le avventure di una criminologa, created by Giancarlo Berardi.

In 2006, Zuccheri began her collaboration with the French writer Sylviane Corgiat drawing Épées de verre, a medieval fantasy genre comic made up of four albums, published in 2009 by Les Humanoïdes Associés. For this French publisher, she also made the science fiction comic, Retour sur Belzagor, with a script by Philippe Thirault (2017).

Zuccheri made a special album for Tex, published in 2019, being the first woman to draw this popular Western Italian comic.

She paints landscapes and portraits, in forms of watercolor, acrylic, tempera, oil on various types of paper and canvas.

== Awards ==
- Gran Guinigi Award for Best Art, Lucca Comics & Games, for Swords of Glass
- U Giancu's Prize (2008), International Cartoonists Exhibition
