= Sergio Toppi =

Italian cartoonist

- Born: October 11, 1932 Milan, Italy
- Died: August 21, 2012 (aged 79) Milan, Italy
- Areas: Artist; writer
- Notable works: Sharaz'de; Collector
- Awards: U Giancu's Prize (2001)

Sergio Toppi (11 October 1932 – 21 August 2012) was an Italian illustrator and comics creator.

== Career ==
Sergio Toppi was born in Milan, Italy. Initially enrolled as a medical student, Toppi started an artistic career in the 1950s, creating illustrations for the UTET Children's Encyclopedia. Alongside this project, he began collaborating on a series of animated advertising films with Pagot as well as working as a cartoonist for the satirical magazine Candido.

In 1966 he finished his first comic strip for Il Corriere dei Piccoli ("The Children's Gazette"), written by Carlo Triberti. The character was the Mago Zurlì ("Zurli Wizard"). For the same magazine Toppi produced numerous war stories .

Subsequently, Toppi worked mainly for one-shot titles, with the exception of the eccentric Collezionista ("Collector") of 1984. He produced adventure/historical titles for CEPIM's Un uomo un'avventura and, for the French publisher Larousse, some episodes of Histoire de France en bandes dessinées and La Découverte du Monde.

Later he collaborated with Il Corriere dei Ragazzi ("The Boys' Gazette"), and the Messaggero dei Ragazzi, the comics title of a popular Rome's newspaper, with historically set stories.

Toppi's works appeared in a host of titles in Italy and abroad, including Linus, Corto Maltese, Sgt. Kirk and Il Giornalino in Italy. His strips were collected in several books. He last worked with the French publisher Mosquito, with which he made 22 books since 1994.

He also made a series of Western and medieval paper soldiers. In 1972 the Corriere dei Piccoli became the Corriere dei Ragazzi, for which he illustrated series such as "Dal Nostro Enviato", "Comics-Truth", "Men Against", and "I Grandi nel Giallo". In the seventies he also worked for comic magazines for children such as Il Giornalino from 1976 until the nineties, and Il Messaggero dei Ragazzi from 1977 to 1979, while also continuing in illustration. He also worked with other Italian comic magazines such as Sergeant Kirk, Linus, Alter Alter and Corto Maltese, publishing dozens of stories and illustrations. For Bonelli he made the tenth volume of the series The Protagonists in 1975 and, between 1976 and 1978, three volumes for the series Un uomo un'avventura published by Cepim: "L'Uomo del Nilo", "L'Uomo del Mexico" and "The Man of the Marshes".

One of the best-known series was a comic-strip version of the Thousand and One Nights titled Sharaz'de, originally serialized on Alter Alter in 1979 and later also published in France and Spain. His illustrations appear in various periodical publications, newspapers and book covers: from Famiglia Cristiana to Selezione from Reader's Digest, from Il Messaggero to Corriere della Sera, from Einaudi books to those of UTET.

In the eighties he published the series Collector, the only permanent character of his career, for the series The Protagonists of Orient Express, as well as comic stories for historic Italian comic magazines such as L'Eternauta, Comic Art and Orient Express. For the French market in the early eighties he collaborated on the Larousse series "L'Histoire de France en Bande Dessinées" and "La Découverte du Monde En Bandes Dessinées." In the nineties the French publisher Mosquito published almost 40 volumes of his works, while in Spain, the publisher Planeta DeAgostini, published (1992) the volume "El Cerro de La Plata - La Leyenda de Potosí".

In 1986 he participated in the creation of Images of Sicily together with other important designers, with the story entitled "Verrà Orlando," published by the Grafema consortium on behalf of the Sicilian Region and the Messina Provincial Tourism Board. Also in the historical context is his contribution to Enzo Biagi's History of Peoples in Comics, drawing the American chapter of the History of Comic Peoples by Arnoldo Mondadori Editore. In 1989 he painted 22 pieces entitled Tarot of the Origins, published by Lo Scarabeo of Turin. In the nineties he collaborated again with Sergio Bonelli Editore, creating some albums of the Nick Raider, Julia, Martin Mystère, and Ken Parker Magazine series.

In the years 2000-2005 he created portfolios for various galleries.

In 2003 he created 12 black-and-white plates for the Leggende del Salento series, published in the limited edition volume Terre Foggiane - Spigolando in Capitanata (Edizioni GEMA).

In 2003 he began to collaborate with Edizioni Crapapelada (Spazio Papel), creating over a hundred large color illustrations in five years. All illustrations are inspired by different literary texts (sometimes written by the artist himself, sometimes suggested by the editor) collected in various portfolios: Legends Without time (2003), Other Legends (2004), Hayku (2005), The Four Elements (2005) - with Ivo Milazzo and Josè Muñoz, Ticonderoga (2006), Tomahawk (2007), Japanese Tales (2007), and The Return of the Samurai (2007).

In 2005 he did work for the American Marvel Comics.

He is known for his original compositions and layout, his wide-ranging choice of subject matter, and his handling of line and hatching.

Among the artists that Toppi has influenced are illustrator Adi Granov.
