= Carlo Ambrosini =

Italian comic book artist and writer (1954–2023)

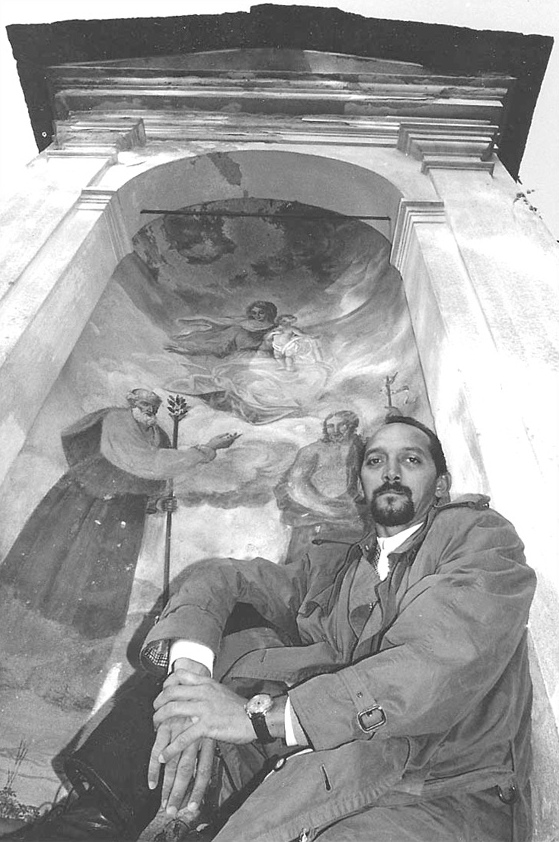
- Ambrosini in 1992
- Born: April 15, 1954 Azzano Mella, Lombardy, Italy
- Died: November 1, 2023 (aged 69)
- Areas: Cartoonist, Artist
- Notable works: Napoleone
- Awards: U Giancu's Prize, 2005

Carlo Ambrosini (15 April 1954 – 1 November 2023) was an Italian comic book artist and writer.

== Life and career ==
Born in Azzano Mella, near Brescia (Lombardy), he began to draw comics in 1976 for Dardo publisher with some war stories. Later, he collaborated with Editoriale Corno, Ediperiodici and Mondadori.

In 1980, he began his collaboration with Sergio Bonelli Editore, Italy's largest comics publisher, with some episodes of Ken Parker written by Giancarlo Berardi. In 1987 Ambrosini's art appeared on Dylan Dog, for which he also wrote a story in 1994.

In 1997, also for Bonelli, he launched the new series Napoleone, entirely produced by him. The series was stopped with #54 in 2006.

Ambrosini died on 1 November 2023, at the age of 69.
