= Giorgio Trevisan =

Italian comic artist (1934–2024)

- Born: 13 October 1934; Merano, Italy
- Died: 5 October 2024 (aged 89); Monselice, Italy
- Occupation: Comic artist

Giorgio Trevisan (13 October 1934 – 5 October 2024) was an Italian comic artist and illustrator.

== Life and career ==
Born in Merano, after his Liceo Classico degree Trevisan studied agricultural science at the University of Padua. An autodidact, he began his career collaborating with the graphic studio of Roy D'Amy; his first work was for the series Cherry Brandy racconta...

In the 1960s, Trevisan moved to Este and started collaborating with several major comic publications, notably Corriere dei Piccoli, often partnering with Mino Milani. He also collaborated with international publishers, including Fleetway Publications and Éditions Lug. In the 1970s he collaborated with Dardo, for which he created the series Medium with Romano Garofalo. In the late 1970s Montanari entered Sergio Bonelli Editore, collaborating with the series Storia del West, Ken Parker and Julia.

Trevisan died in Monselice on 5 October 2024, at the age of 89.
