= Franco Donatelli =

Italian artist (1924–1995)

Franco Donatelli (Alessandria, 13 March 1924 – Milano, 11 November 1995) was an Italian comic book artist and illustrator. Donatelli is best known as the regular artist on the Zagor series.

His first work was assisting Mario Faustinelli on Furio Almirante. Following that work, Donatelli took a job in a bank. From 1946 he finally dedicated himself to comics. He drew such comics like Mistero, Silver Scout, Pecos Bill and Radar. Donatelli was working for Sergio Bonelli Editore from the mid 1960s until the 1990s. He illustrated many stories of Zagor from #37 until #375 of regular series. In the 1970s he drew three stories of Mister No.
