= Fabio Civitelli =

Italian comic artist

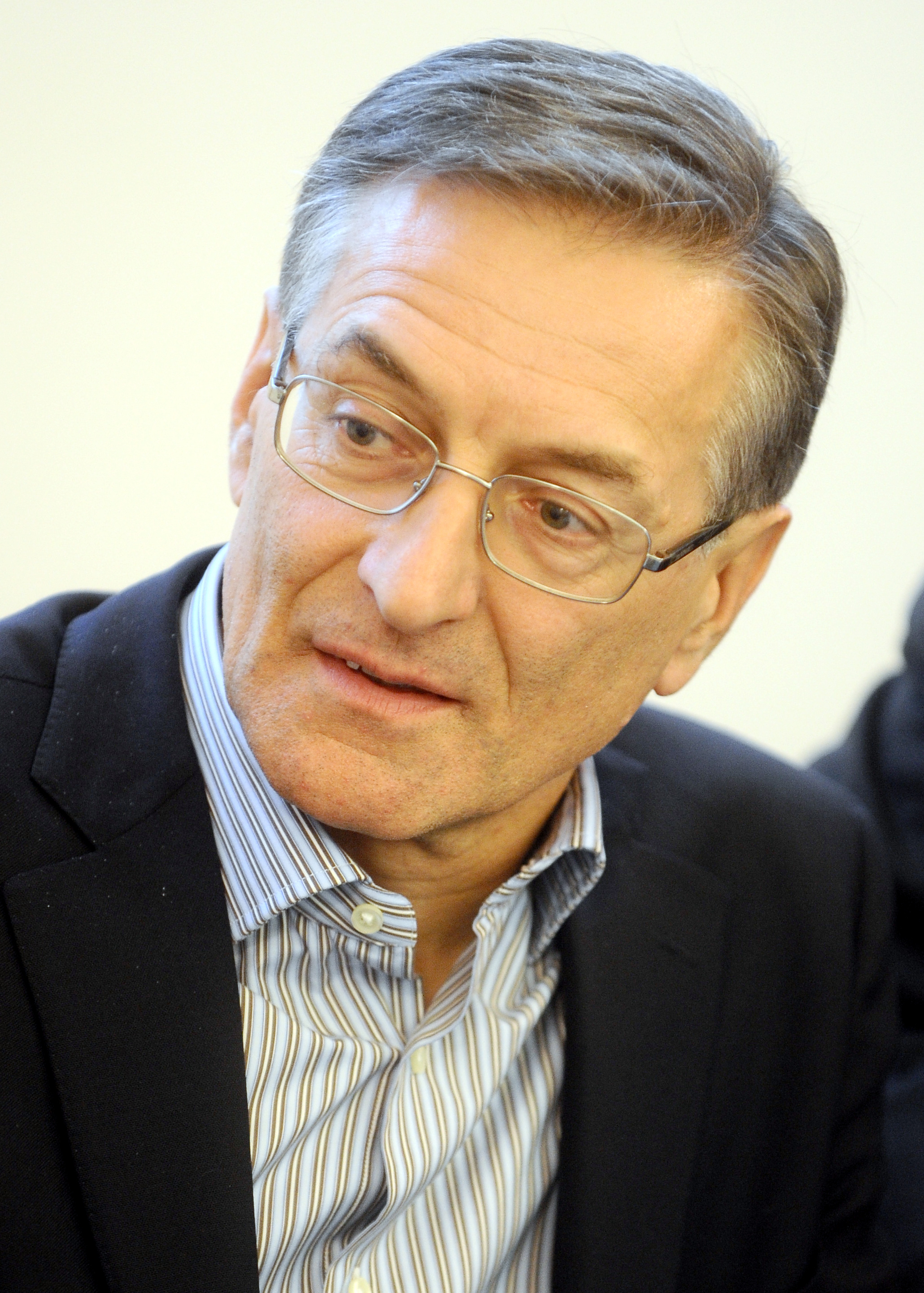
Fabio Civitelli at Lucca Comics & Games 2014

Fabio Civitelli (born 9 April 1955 in Lucignano) is an Italian comic artist best known for illustrating stories for Tex Willer, a popular comic in Italy. Civitelli is often remarked as being highly skilled with ink drawings, which allows him to draw clean strips. His own interpretation of the character, Tex, respects the old tradition set by Aurelio Galleppini while being modern and pleasant. He often stated, in the past, that Marvel Comics authors, Gian Luigi Bonelli and Alex Raymond influenced his style of drawing.

Civitelli is skilled in drawing faces, often inspired by famous actors and celebrities, whose likeness he uses to represent some minor characters in the strips.
