= Lazarus Ledd =

Italian comic book

- Author: Ade Capone
- Illustrator(s): Giancarlo Olivares, Giulio De Vita, Sergio Gerasi, Alfredo Orlandi, Alessandro Bocci
- Current status/schedule: Concluded
- Launch date: 1992
- End date: 2017
- Publisher(s): Star Comics, Cosmo Editoriale
- Genre(s): Action, adventure, drama
- Original language: Italian

Lazarus Ledd is an Italian comic book in the science fiction-action genre, first published in Italy in 1993 by Edizioni Star Comics. It tells the story of a former secret agent, now turned taxi driver, who is forced to fight crime in New York by a mysterious organization.

The comics debuted with a #0 issued for the Lucca Comics event of 1992. The regular series started in July 1993, with 96-pages issues, lasting until november 2006 when #151 appeared. An "Extra" series with 128-pages books was also published from november 1994 to August 2009, for a total of 27 books. A #152 final issue was published by Comso Books in October 2017.

Authors who worked on the Lazarus Ledd include writers Ade Capone, Stefano Vietti, Marcello Toninelli and drawers Emanuelo Barison, Alberto Gennari, Giancarlo Olivares and Stefano Raffaele.

== Publication history ==
The character made his debut in a special issue numbered "no. 0" titled La fine della corsa (The End of the Race), presented at Lucca Comics in October 1992. The issue featured an 8-page story, which is chronologically set between issues 2 and 3 of the regular series, along with introductory material about the character and its creators.

This was followed by the launch of the main series: 96-page black-and-white issues published by Star Comics from July 1993 to November 2006, totaling 151 issues. Due to its success, a parallel line titled Extra was introduced, consisting of 128-page issues published from November 1994 to August 2009, for a total of 27 issues. Typically, two Extra issues were released each year—one in the summer and one in the winter.

In mid-2004, Ade Capone made the decision to switch the main series to a bimonthly schedule, beginning in March 2005. This change, made for various production reasons, ultimately proved unsuccessful; however, reverting to a monthly schedule was no longer feasible. As a result, the decision was made to end the series. The final issue of the main run, no. 151 – L’ultima battaglia (The Final Battle), was released in November 2006.

Nevertheless, both the publisher and Capone chose to continue the story of Lazarus Ledd, starting with Extra no. 23 – Il volo dell’Aquila (The Flight of the Eagle), released in July 2007. The final Extra issue, no. 27 – Le notti rosse (Red Nights), hit newsstands in August 2009, marking the definitive end of Capone’s nearly two-decade-long collaboration with Star Comics.

In October 2009, at Lucca Comics, Capone presented the true epilogue to his character’s saga with the special issue Arizona Moon.

Over the course of its publishing life, Lazarus Ledd was also the subject of numerous special and one-shot stories, released as promotional issues for conventions and festivals, featured in Star Comics event editions, or published by other companies. One notable crossover was a team-up with Sam Fisher from the Splinter Cell series, which was released digitally in collaboration with Ubisoft.

In May 2010, IF Edizioni reprinted the first twelve issues of the main series, along with several short stories, in six large-format volumes featuring new covers illustrated by Alessandro Bocci, a longtime artist and cover designer for the series.

At Lucca Comics & Games 2014, Editoriale Cosmo announced that it would publish the final story of the Lazarus Ledd saga in 2015. The release was eventually postponed until October 2017, when issue no. 152 was published, continuing the original numbering and using the same spine design as the main series. Titled THE END, the issue featured a story by Ade Capone and a conclusion written by Leo Ortolani, following the death of Capone, the character’s creator.

A distinctive feature of the series was the integration of music into its storytelling. Many story titles were drawn from songs or albums by both international and Italian artists, and songs by these musicians were referenced within the pages. A variant edition of the second Extra issue was even released with a cassette tape or CD titled Lazarus Ledd Soundtrack, featuring selected tracks used in the comic's stories and original compositions written specifically for the series by Ade Capone.
