= Capitanio =

Capitanio is an Italian surname. Notable people with the surname include:

- Aldo Capitanio (1952–2001), Italian comic book artist
- Bartolomea Capitanio (1807–1833), Italian saint
- Filippo Capitanio (born 1993), Italian footballer
- Giulio Capitanio (born 1952), Italian cross-country skier
