= Star Comics (Italy) =

Italian comic book publisher

- Status: Active
- Founded: March 1987; 39 years ago
- Founders: Sergio Cavallerin; Giovanni Bovini
- Country of origin: Italy
- Headquarters location: Perugia, Italy
- Publication types: Comic books, manga
- Official website: www.starcomics.com

Star Comics is an Italian comic book publisher founded in December 1987 that publishes Italian editions of manga and Italian comics in Italy. Until the establishment of Marvel Italia (now an imprint of Panini Comics) in 1994, it also published Italian editions of many Marvel Comics's comic books. Star Comics has twenty-eight publishing branches and as of 2007 has published a total of 316 manga series in Italy.

== History ==
=== Background ===
In the mid-1980s, the popularity of Marvel Comics superheroes in Italy was in sharp decline. After nearly fifteen years of publication by Editoriale Corno—and following a tremendous success in the previous decade—only one series featuring original stories remained (L'Uomo Ragno, second series), which came to an end with issue no. 58 in January 1984, coinciding with the bankruptcy of Editoriale Corno. This was followed by a complete publishing void that lasted about fifteen months.

In the autumn of 1985, a small publisher from Todi, Labor Comics, acquired the rights to publish two Marvel comic series: Alien (featuring material from the Epic imprint) and Collana Labor, which included stories from the Marvel Graphic Novel series (vol. 1). It was in the latter magazine that Marco Marcello Lupoi made his editorial debut in December 1985.

In 1986, Labor launched another magazine (titled Marvel) to showcase the regular superhero series by Stan Lee. It began with the now-classic "Proteus Saga", created by the duo Chris Claremont and John Byrne and taken from issues 123–126 of the American Uncanny X-Men series. However, the monthly publication shut down after just two issues, along with the publishing house itself.

=== Birth and Development ===
From the ashes of Labor Comics, Star Comics was born in 1987 through the efforts of Sergio Cavallerin and Marco Marcello Lupoi. The duo proposed to Giovanni Bovini (owner of a printing press in Bosco, a district of Perugia) the low-cost publication of L'Uomo Ragno. The proposal was accepted, and the project launched on 6 March 1987, with Cavallerin as editor-in-chief and Lupoi as editorial coordinator. Sales were initially slow, but eventually rose enough for Star Comics to turn a profit and launch other popular titles such as Fantastic Four, Gli incredibili X-Men, Captain America e The Avengers, Il Punitore, along with lesser-known series and special one-shots.

The arrival of Marvel Italia in 1994, which acquired all rights to Marvel's publications in Italy, prompted Star Comics to completely rethink its superhero line. The publisher had to relinquish the series previously managed by Lupoi (who immediately joined Marvel Italia), but managed to stay afloat thanks to a new editorial team recruited by Ade Capone and led by Paolo A. Livorati, with translations by Andrea Cotta Ramusino and Valerio Lanari. In this "new phase" (1994–1998), Star introduced Italian audiences to comics from Image Comics (including Spawn and Gen¹³) and several series from Dark Horse Comics, becoming Italy's main outlet for both major American independent labels. From mid-1995, due to the growing creative fragmentation of the Image consortium, Star focused on the WildStorm imprint, featuring characters created by Jim Lee.

At the same time, Star decided—under the guidance of the Kappa Boys—to expand beyond American titles and begin publishing manga (Japanese comics). This proved to be a fortunate move, coinciding with (and partly sparking) a boom in Japanese comics readership in Italy. Notably, with Dragon Ball, Star became the first publisher in Italy to release a manga in the original right-to-left reading format. The company also resumed popular series left incomplete due to the bankruptcy of Granata Press, such as Ranma ½ and Maison Ikkoku. Since 1999, the Japanese sector has been the driving force of the Perugia-based publisher, with major titles such as Saint Seiya, One Piece, Shaman King, Fairy Tail, Detective Conan, Le bizzarre avventure di JoJo, Sailor Moon, Vinland Saga, and the aforementioned Dragon Ball, Dragon Ball Super and Ranma ½.

Star Comics has also published original Italian comics. Among these is Lazarus Ledd, created by Ade Capone, who wrote nearly all of the approximately 200 stories of varying lengths starring the character. The regular series began as a monthly in 1993 and shifted to bimonthly in 2004, concluding in November 2006 with issue no. 151, titled L'ultima battaglia ("The Final Battle"). However, two or three special volumes per year are still planned. In August 2004, Star Comics also acquired and relaunched Jonathan Steele, created and written by Federico Memola, which had been discontinued in July of that same year by Sergio Bonelli Editore.

The USA comics sector was closed in December 1998 due to several concurrent factors, including the sale of WildStorm characters to DC Comics by Jim Lee, a reduction in WildStorm's output, and internal disagreements regarding editorial direction.

In 2004, Star Comics returned to American comics with the launch of the anthologies Star Magazine New and Star Book under the supervision of Dario Gulli. However, the decision to distribute the magazines only through specialty comic shops failed to yield the expected results, and both publications were discontinued within two years due to low sales. Likewise, the magazine Star Fantasy, overseen by Ade Capone, ended after just a few issues.

After a failed attempt to expand into the television magazine sector, the Perugia-based publisher decided to focus entirely on manga and Italian comics, launching the self-produced miniseries Nemrod and Khor in 2007.

In 2009, Star Comics published Rourke by Federico Memola, continuing its investment in original Italian titles.

Thanks to the success of these Italian comic series, Star Comics has increased its investment in local projects since 2010. Notable titles released after that year include Factor V, Valter Buio, Pinkerton S.A., The Secret, Dr. Morgue, Kepher, and San Michele: I Sigilli della Folgore.

On the manga front, 2009 was a pivotal year: in the early part of the year, Star Comics ended its long-standing collaboration with the Kappa Boys, who had served as consultants and talent scouts. Although the publisher attributed the split to a "divergence of objectives", the Kappa Boys never made a direct statement, though they implied—without going into detail—that there may have been some contractual breaches.

2013 marked the debut of Suore Ninja, a humorous comic scripted by Davide La Rosa and illustrated by Vanessa Cardinale, produced following the success of their previous self-published work, Zombie Gay in Vaticano.

From January 2014, supervision of the Western comics division was entrusted to Davide G.G. Caci, appointed as publishing manager after several prior editorial experiences. In September 2016, Cristian Posocco—formerly head of Flashbook Edizioni for a decade—was also brought in as publishing manager, but for the manga and Eastern division.

In February 2021, the publishing house announced a new logo and the creation of two labels: Star (for manga, managed by Posocco) and Astra (for Western comics, managed by Caci).

=== Mondadori Era (since 2022) ===
On 6 June 2022, it was announced that the Mondadori Group had acquired 51% of the share capital of the Perugia-based publisher Star Comics, in a deal estimated to be worth €15 million. The agreement stipulated that CEO Simone Bovini and editorial director Claudia Bovini would retain their respective managerial roles, as would the majority of their editorial staff. The headquarters of Star Comics remained in Bosco, and Mondadori also acquired 100% of Grafiche Bovini S.r.L., the company previously responsible for printing and distributing Star Comics titles.

Mondadori's CEO Antonio Porro praised Star Comics' development and diversification of formats and genres, which contributed to the continual expansion of its catalogue. The Milan-based publishing giant saw the acquisition as a strategic step to expand into the growing comics market by aligning with the Bovini family's publishing house, which had become a central player not only in newsstands but also in bookstores and comic book shops across the country.

"The comics segment has, in recent years, been a significant driver of growth for the entire book industry, thanks to the strong innovation in its offerings and its extraordinary ability to engage new readers."

For Star Comics, as stated in official remarks by Claudia Bovini, the opportunity to join Italy's leading publishing group opened a new path toward affirming comics as a mainstream cultural product, similar to what had already happened in other European countries.

A direct consequence at the sales level was that Mondadori/Star Comics achieved over 30% of the comics market share in the bookstore circuit, becoming the leading comics publisher in Italy within that sector. Star Comics thus gained a leadership position in bookstores, which have emerged as the fastest-growing retail outlets for comics internationally during the 2020s. The publisher positioned itself ahead of other major players such as Sergio Bonelli Editore, Edizioni BD, and Panini Comics.

This strategic move reflects broader trends in the Direct Market of the United States, widely considered the reference point for the Western comics industry. In fact, 2021 marked the best year ever for U.S. comics sales, reaching over $2 billion in total revenue. This record holds even when adjusted for inflation, going back to the 1950s. There was a stunning 62% increase in sales compared to 2020, and a 70% increase over 2019. The bookstore market led this surge, generating $1.165 billion in revenue. Comic book shops—once the main distribution channel (since the modern era began in 1992)—ranked second with around $700 million in sales. Digital comics came in third with $170 million, while other channels (such as newsstands and drugstores) accounted for just $35 million.

On September 5, 2023, Star Comics announced that it would be the new Italian publisher of Frank Miller's works, meanwhile from 2024 succeeds to Magic Press as Italian publisher of Hellboy comics.

On March 3, 2025, Mondadori's stake will rise to 75.5%.

== Publishing branches ==
1. Action
2. Amici
3. Anime comics
4. Dragon
5. Dragon Quest
6. Express
7. Fan
8. Ghost
9. Greatest
10. Gundam universe
11. Hot
12. Kappa extra
13. Kappa magazine
14. Kappa magazine speciale
15. KM Presenta
16. Must
17. Mitico
18. Neverland
19. Point break
20. Shot
21. Starlight
22. Storie di kappa
23. Techno
24. Turn over
25. Up
26. Up Speciale
27. Young
28. Zero
29. Albi fuoriserie
