= Tex Willer =

Fictional character

Publication information
- Publisher: Sergio Bonelli Editore
- First appearance: Tex #1 (30 September 1948)
- Created by: Gian Luigi Bonelli; Aurelio Galleppini

In-story information
- Notable aliases: Aquila della Notte (Eagle of the Night)

Tex Willer is the main fictional character of the Italian comics series Tex, created by writer Gian Luigi Bonelli and illustrator Aurelio Galleppini, and first published in Italy on 30 September 1948. The series is among the most popular Italian comics, with translations into numerous languages around the world. The fan base in Brazil is especially large, but it is also very popular in Finland, Norway, Greece, Turkey, Croatia, France, India, Serbia, Bosnia-Herzegovina, Israel and Spain. Issues have also been published in the United Kingdom and the United States.

The Tex series is an Italian-made interpretation of the American Old West, inspired by the classical characters and stories of old American Western movies, and occasionally by American history. Galleppini also took inspiration from Sardinia, where he grew up.

Tex is depicted as a tough man with a strong personal sense of justice, who becomes a Texas ranger (even if living in Arizona) and defends Native Americans and any other honest character from the greed of bandits, unscrupulous merchants and corrupt politicians and tycoons.

Native Americans are portrayed in a complex way, emphasizing positive and negative aspects of their culture. The same can be said of the American authorities, such as the U.S. Army, politicians, businessmen, sheriffs or the Bureau of Indian Affairs. Tex had a son, Kit (who also became a ranger), with a Native American woman, Lilyth, the daughter of a Navajo chief; Lilyth died of smallpox early in the series, but remains a recurring character in flashbacks. Later, Tex himself went on to become the Chief of the Navajo tribe.

Tex is not only featured in a monthly comic book series, but also in a special series called Tex Albo Speciale (sometimes called Texone, meaning 'big Tex', because of their bigger size). The Texone comic books have around 240 pages and some artists known outside the Tex universe have been involved, like Jordi Bernet, Joe Kubert and Ivo Milazzo.

== Fictional character background ==
Tex Willer's first adventure appeared on 30 September 1948, as a comic strip. The "first" Tex is an unwilling outlaw with a strong code of honour: he kills only for self-defence. Almost immediately, however, Tex becomes a ranger. Because of his marriage with the beautiful Navajo woman Lilyth, he becomes Chief of the Navajos, known as Aquila della Notte (Eagle of the Night), and a defender of Native American rights. He also becomes the respected Indian agent of the Navajo tribe. Tough, loyal, a skilled shot, and an enemy of prejudice and discrimination, Tex is very quick and smart and has a marked disregard for strict rules; however, he has no pity for criminals of any stripe, nor regard for their rights if they do not immediately cooperate with the law.

Tex's closest friend in almost every adventure since becoming a ranger, is Kit Carson, loosely inspired by the historic figure of the same name. A main role has been held by Tex Willer's son, Kit Willer, and by the Navajo warrior Tiger Jack; though the importance of the last two has diminished. Other recurring characters include El Morisco (a kind of warlock-scientist of Egyptian origin, living in north-eastern Mexico), the Mexican Montales (originally a bandido who fought against a corrupt government, and afterwards a successful politician), the Canadian trapper Gros-Jean, the Irish boxer Pat Mac Ryan, the Mountie Colonel Jim Brandon, San Francisco Police Department Captain Tom Devlin, the Apache chief Cochise, and the Navajo wizard Nuvola Rossa (Red Cloud).

Tex Willer's nemesis is Mefisto, an evil magician and illusionist. Other enemies include Yama (Mefisto's son), The Black Tiger (a Malay prince who hates the white race and wants its annihilation in the United States), and Proteus (able to shapeshift his own face, and impersonate other people).

During the American Civil War Tex fought for the Union, although his home state, Texas, sided with the Confederacy. He participated in the Battle of Glorieta Pass and briefly served in the 7th Regiment Kansas Volunteer Cavalry.

== Characters ==
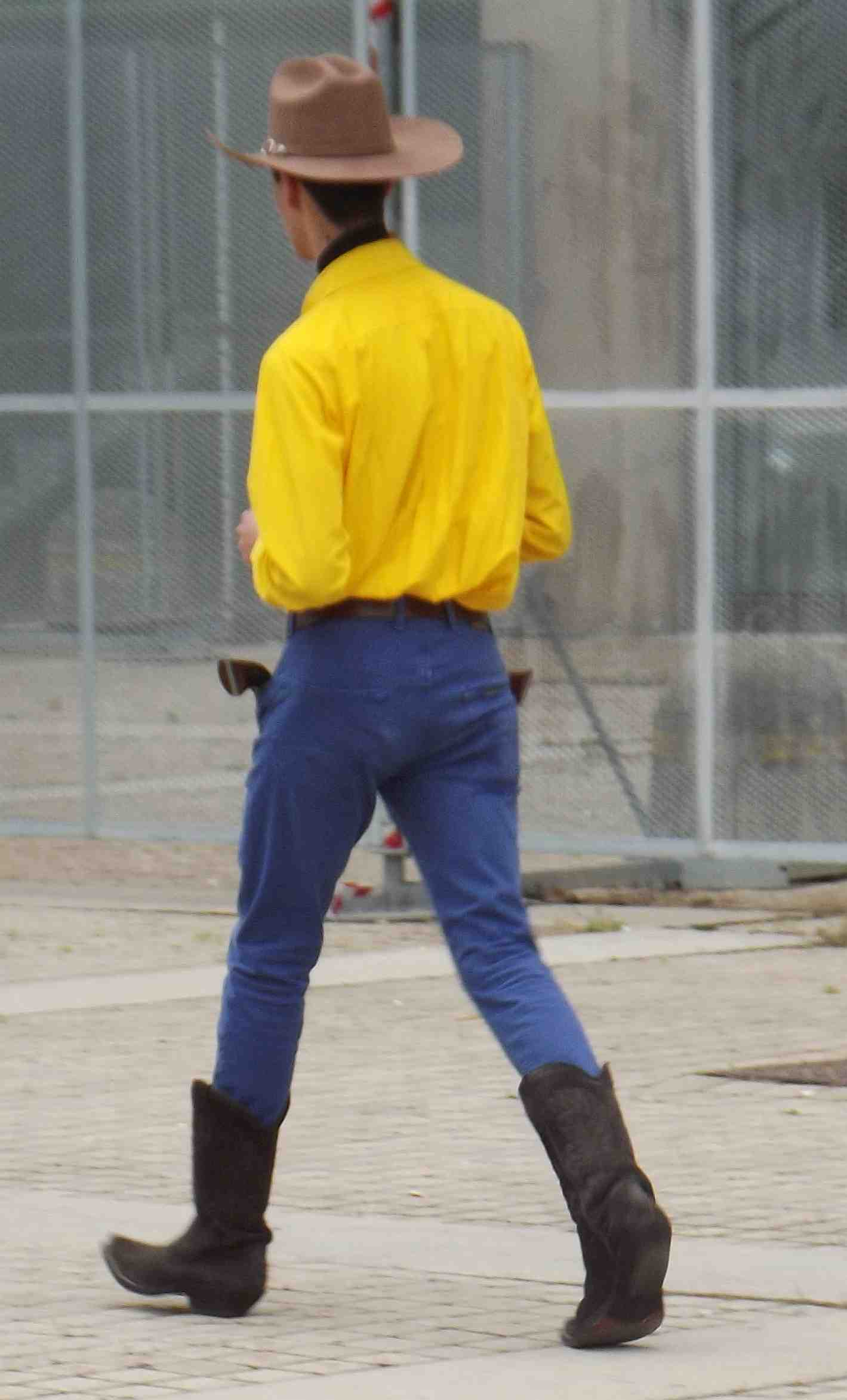
A Tex Willer cosplay at the Torino Comics 20th edition

The following are the characters of the series:

=== Main characters ===
- Tex Willer, the protagonist, a Texas ranger, chief of the Navajo tribe and also the Bureau of Indian Affairs agent of the Navajo Reservation. Born in the Nueces Valley in Texas, Tex grew up in a ranching family with his father Ken and younger brother Sam. His mother Mae died when Tex and Sam were children. Tex lost his father Ken to a gang of cattle thieves, and becomes an outlaw when he follows the thieves to Mexico and kills them. He later sells his part of the ranch to his brother and leaves. Sam later sells the ranch and moves to Culver City, planning to buy a bigger ranch; he is then killed by the town's lordling, Tom Rebo. Before becoming a Texas ranger, Tex officially lives as an outlaw but avoids committing any crime if not for self-defense, trying to clean up his name. Tex Willer is physically modeled after actor Gary Cooper.
- Kit Carson, Tex's best friend and mentor as a ranger, loosely based on the historical Kit Carson. He is older than Tex (his real age is never revealed, but he is described and depicted as being around 55 years old) and a famous frontiersman, respected both by Americans and Native Americans – the latter know him by the name Capelli d'Argento (Silver Hair) because of his grey hair. He has lifelong experience as an explorer and pioneer of the Western frontier, but he has travelled nearly the entire U.S. territory and has a deep knowledge of its Native people and geography, which makes him a sort of living legend. As a former military man, he is also the tactically most skilled among the main characters.
- Kit Willer, Tex's son, named after his godfather Kit Carson. He is around 25 years old. He was born in the Navajo village where Tex resides and his father sent him to a Christian mission near the Navajo reserve. Initially, Tex wants him to attend a military academy, but as Kit wants to live freely among the Natives, Tex and Tiger Jack teach him frontier life and how to deal with guns and outlaws. Later, Kit becomes a Texas ranger himself. He is young and sometimes reckless, but also the most learned among the characters: for example, he recognizes the Greek 'pi' (π) used by a criminal as his sign and connects it to the name of the Greek god Proteus.
- Tiger Jack, the most respected Navajo warrior and the second-in-command of the Navajo people, after Tex. He is a brave warrior, proud of his origins and faithful to the Navajo people's traditions and culture. He is the greyest of the main characters: he is the only one who, in the entire series (supplements included), knowingly opens fire towards an unarmed enemy, and it has repeatedly been implied that he would torture or kill women if needed — something neither Tex nor Kit Carson nor Kit Willer would do. Born in a village in the Navajo mountains, before becoming Tex's friend Tiger has a girlfriend, Taniah, kidnapped by a Mexican outlaw, and who eventually takes her own life during captivity.

=== Friends and allies ===
- Montales (full name: Miguel Ángel Montales) is a former Mexican bandido, soldier and official of a rebel revolutionary army fighting against the Mexican regime, and current governor of the state of Chihuahua and vice-president of Mexico. Montales is a character created by Giovanni Luigi Bonelli and visually realized by Galep. He is one of the protagonist Tex's most trusted friends. He lost his parents and his wife following the destruction of the family hacienda. From being initially a man of action, Montales later becomes decisive thanks to his Mexican political connections, and more than once he manages to get the rangers out of trouble - trouble, moreover, in which they were most often involved by Montales himself. In the most recent episodes in which he appears, Montales partially returns to action.
- El Morisco (real name: Ahmed Jamal) is a warlock, scientist, naturalist, and doctor from Memphis, Egypt, who lives in Pilares, Mexico, in a house with a rather sinister facade, together with Eusebio, his grim but faithful and devoted general assistant of Aztec origin. El Morisco is a scholar expert in various subjects, both scientific and humanistic (including, just to name a few, biology, mineralogy, and the history of pre-Columbian civilizations); he also has a particular interest in anything connected with the supernatural. On the other hand, he is of no help as a man of action (because of his rather corpulent build and inability to handle any kind of firearms). Although a pure scholar and not a man of action, he is Tex's main ally and consultant when the ranger has to face occultism, black magic, and necromancy. El Morisco is altruistic and completely devoted to his research, but the people of Pilares fear him and call him "el brujo", "the Sorcerer".
- Eusebio is a Mexican of Aztec origin and the grim assistant of El Morisco. He makes his first appearance in the same issue in which his master appears (no. 77, The Treasure of the Temple). On more than one occasion he risks his life for the scholar of Pilares, to whom he is deeply devoted, disobeying his orders only once, by burning a letter entrusted to him by Tex and thus risking putting the ranger in serious trouble. Eusebio assists El Morisco in his scientific experiments and follows him on his study journeys. When necessary, he is able to use firearms, unlike his master. He does not always readily accept that El Morisco accompanies the four Pards, being aware that their proximity can seriously endanger his master's life.
- Gros-Jean, a Canadian métis French-Canadian, former outlaw and current trapper by profession, working in Canada. Because of his size, he is endowed with remarkable strength but not with particular intelligence (so much so that, in one of the first stories in which he appears, he causes a saloon to collapse and ends up buried under the rubble). On the other hand, he is a generous and loyal companion and is therefore well liked by Tex and the Pards, who promptly come to his aid. His only flaw is a tendency towards alcohol drinking. The stories in which he is the protagonist are almost always set in Canada or Alaska, and therefore the landscapes and the stories themselves depart from the classic Western pattern typical of the comic. In the same issues, another trusted friend of the ranger is often present, the colonel of the Redcoats, Jim Brandon.
- Jim Brandon, a Colonel of the Royal Canadian Mounted Police in Canada. Brandon was initially a simple sergeant, very skilled with firearms and who, thanks to his abilities, quickly rises through the ranks. He often contacts Tex to resolve delicate matters he encounters, even if at times he struggles to accept Tex's blunt methods, especially because of his own strong sense of duty. From his first appearance, he nevertheless becomes a great friend of the ranger and, together with his compatriot Gros-Jean, the protagonist of many stories set in his home country.
- Cochise, chief of the Chiricahua Apache tribe, loosely based on the historical figure. He is always ready, with his people, to come to the aid of his friend Tex, himself the Native chief Eagle of the Night, whenever the rights of the Navajo are at stake. He has "buried the hatchet" against the so-called bluecoats (that is, the United States Army), but this has not diminished his prestige among his warriors.
- Tom Devlin, a police captain in San Francisco, California, as well as a trusted friend of Tex. Later, Devlin is the chief of police of San Francisco. Thanks to the friendship between the two, the police chief of the turbulent city repeatedly benefits from the help of Tex and his companions, whose intervention is always decisive in cleaning up the city.
- Pat MacRyan, an Irish "giant" boxer endowed with remarkable strength, because of which he often starts colossal brawls, especially if someone dares to mock his native country. Not gifted with particular intelligence and absolutely incapable of using firearms, he is nevertheless well liked by Tex and his Pards, who frequently step in to get him out of the trouble he gets himself into rather often. Over the years it is revealed that he has worked at many different jobs, including, for example, trapper and lumberjack.
- Lefty Potrero is the burly owner of a gym and health club in San Francisco. Potrero, together with his gym's regulars (including Angelo, a sort of English gentleman who uses his walking stick in an "unusual" way), helps Tex on more than one occasion to wipe out entire Chinese gangs.
- Nat MacKennet, the sheriff of a turbulent New Orleans, perpetually plagued by Afro-Cuban criminal gangs.
- Ely Parker, head of the American Bureau of Indian Affairs from 1869 to 1871. This character's creation was inspired by the historical figure of the same name.
- Ulysses S. Grant, General of the US Army and President of the United States from 1869 to 1877.
- Nuvola Rossa (Red Cloud), a Navajo shaman.
- Lilyth, Tex's deceased Navajo wife and Kit's mother. She was daughter to Freccia Rossa (Red Arrow), Navajo's chief at the time when Tex met Lilyth. Lilyth met Tex in a dramatic situation: the ranger was about to be executed at the torture stake; it was Lilyth's intervention that saved him, by proposing a marriage between the two. The ranger consented for reasons of necessity, but soon a genuine romantic relationship developed between the hero and the young woman; from their union, Kit was born. By marrying her, Tex became a member of the tribe, taking on the name Eagle of the Night (a name derived from the disguise he used at that time). Lilyth died prematurely, among the last victims of a smallpox epidemic unleashed by two shady businessmen from Denver, Fred Brennan and Jim Teller. Tex had them arrested at the end of the very adventure in which he met her, destroying the organization they had created to sell weapons to the Native Americans in order to provoke a war. Lilyth could have escaped the scourge had she gone with Tex to the missions of Taos - where the ranger had taken his son Kit to receive medical treatment - but she preferred to remain by her father's side, allowing her husband to be accompanied by the squaw of a certain Black Wolf. The ranger took revenge thanks to his wife's insight: it was she who suggested the connection between the spread of the disease and the delivery to the reservation of some blankets by men whose faces were "pockmarked", that is, scarred by smallpox pustules, to which they had survived. From the direct perpetrators, Tex managed to trace the names of the instigators, thus fulfilling the solemn oath sworn on Lilyth's grave. Although Lilyth disappears after only a few issues and returns only in rare flashbacks, she remains a key figure in the entire saga. She is the only woman ever loved by the hero, the protagonist of some of the comic's more romantic moments, and is still present "indirectly" through their only heir. In 2008, on the occasion of the comic's sixtieth anniversary, the celebratory color issue no. 575, titled On the Trail of Memories, was published, written by Claudio Nizzi and illustrated by Fabio Civitelli: after many years it presents a story centered on Lilyth, set during the brief period of her marriage. In 2018 the young Navajo woman appears again in The Secret of Lilyth, a short story by writer Mauro Boselli and artist Fabio Civitelli published in Tex Magazine 70 anni.
- Freccia Rossa (Red Arrow) is the father of Lilyth and Tex's father-in-law, as well as his predecessor as leader of the Navajo tribes. He meets his future son-in-law in circumstances that are anything but pleasant: his warriors nearly execute him at the torture stake. However, he readily consents to the Native marriage between this unknown pale face and his beloved daughter, and welcomes him into his village. The bond between the two is marked by the utmost respect and, in the absence of Eagle of the Night, the good Freccia Rossa takes care of his grandson Kit. He soon disappears from the saga: his death is revealed in issue no. 16 (The Fire). He returns only in rare flashbacks: in particular, it is worth recalling the one featured in The Oath.
- Dinamite is, for many issues, Tex's horse, endowed with great speed and intelligence. Tex encounters him, still wild, after entering the Corlis Rodeo in San Antonio; after taming him, he keeps him as his horse. Although in the early years he is a constant presence in the comic, at a certain point Dinamite is set aside and Eagle of the Night thus stops calling his mount by name. His fate is told only in 2018, on the occasion of Tex's seventieth anniversary. Another four-legged companion had less fortune, a dog named Satan, who makes a brief appearance in the very first issues.
- Lena and her daughter Donna Parker: Lena is a singer and dancer in the saloon of Bannock, Montana, about twenty-five years before the events of the Tex saga. She now runs an inn in Heaven, Nevada. She is a former love interest to Kit Carson and it is implied that her daughter Donna – who she raised alone for twenty years – may in fact be Kit Carson's daughter. When Kit Carson destroys The "Innocents" band (see below), Lena flees Bannock and disappears, only to return to the mine and live there for the next two and a half decades. She later opens an inn in Heaven, Nevada (nos. 463–465). Donna is a love interest to Kit Willer. She was also the co-owner of a mining claim together with the then sheriff of Bannock, Ray Clemmons (nos. 406–408). She appears to be in a relationship with Tex's son, Kit.
- The "Innocents": loosely based on the criminal gang of the same name, the Innocents steal gold in Montana during the gold rush and are responsible for the killing of many miners. A young Kit Carson is sent to investigate. Although the gang is eventually destroyed by Carson, the plot line is a recurring one in Tex.
- Fiore di Luna is the daughter of the Ute chief Naso Piatto (Flat Nose). Luna saves Kit Willer by pulling him from the Little Colorado River, where he had fallen following a clash with bandits, losing his memory. The love that blossoms between the two young people is short-lived: Luna sacrifices her life to save that of her Kit.
- Manuela Montoya: in the story in which she appears, Manuela Montoya falls in love with Kit Willer, who has saved her from the charge of a herd. The two young people wish to marry, but the girl - the daughter of the wealthy rancher Carlos - is promised to a certain Pedro Cortez, of the same social class, athletic build, and a small hidalgo mustache. To prevent the marriage, the latter has her kidnapped, and her rescue is naturally carried out with the help of the Pards. Despite the "happy ending" of the affair, the paths of the two young people inevitably part.
- Phil Davis is a general in the United States Army and one of the few high-ranking officers respected by the ranger. He usually appears in delicate situations between Native Americans and the army, such as in the matter of the Sioux lands; Tex in fact asks him for help to avoid armed conflicts and to rein in "hot-headed" officers.
- Mac Parland is a senior official of the Pinkerton detective agency.
- Manuel Doberado is a scientist and a friend of El Morisco. He appears in two different episodes of the series: in the first he is the victim of the shady plans of his colleague Juan Velarde; later he helps the Pards on a remote island in the Gulf of Mexico.
- Mike Tracy is a former police officer and the owner of the Alameda hotel, an establishment in San Francisco.
- Bingo is one of the sturdy habitués of Lefty Potrero's gym. He is married to a kind young woman who is no less strong and quick with her hands than her husband.
- Gentry is an elderly trapper with a fear of water who assists Tex in the fight against Mefisto and the Hualpai in The Tragic Bridge. He dies in the same story, struck by the spear of the chief Thopai.
- The Ladies of the Holy League (Le Dame della Santa Lega) are robust, muscular, and forceful women devoted to the prohibitionist struggle against alcohol in San Francisco. Led by Bingo's wife, they smash a saloon that serves as a meeting place for a gang of criminals, along with its owners and patrons.
- The Sasquatch is a mysterious wild man of the woods with thaumaturgic powers who, in the story of the same name, saves Tex, Tiger, and a friend of theirs who is an archaeologist from the fury of the sorcerer of the Klamath, Kaasda, while allowing him to take revenge on the true culprits, two students of the same archaeologist.
- Juan Raza is a former comanchero who later joins the ranks of the Rangers; he has a Mexican father and a Comanche mother. He is one of the few figures in the long Tex saga to display a certain psychological complexity. Tex and Kit Carson meet him when, together with the ranger Jesse Hawks, Morisco and his faithful servant Eusebio, they set out on the trail of Miguel and Juanita De La Serna, two Mexican youths kidnapped by Raza on behalf of a sect of Egyptian fanatics, the Sons of Horus, who intend to sacrifice them to awaken the mummy of the priest Akhran, of whom the two unfortunate youths are descendants on their mother's side. At the crucial moment, on the verge of the macabre ritual, the comanchero reveals an unexpected underlying honesty, allying himself with Tex and his companions to save the youths' lives; once the affair is concluded, he allows himself to be persuaded by Jesse Hawks to join the Rangers. A few years after joining the Rangers, Juan Raza is accused, with seemingly irrefutable evidence, of murdering a colleague and robbing a shipment of gold. His subsequent disappearance appears to be an admission of guilt, and the only ones to believe in his innocence are Tex and Carson, who, after thorough investigation, discover that Raza has simply been framed by a traitorous ranger, Vance Daniels, who tricks him into falling into the hands of a band of desperados. Tex, Carson, and Jesse Hawks, however, together with several other rangers, manage to penetrate the gang's hideout in time to prevent Raza's death, but at a high price: to prevent Daniels from killing Juan, the elderly Jesse steps between the two, taking the bullet meant for his friend and dying in his place. After taking revenge, deeply shaken by Jesse's loss, Raza expresses the desire to leave the Rangers and remain alone for some time, neither with the law nor against it. Juan's father, Pedro Raza, made his debut in 2023 in the series Tex Willer.
- George Morrow is an army officer who first appears in The Lost Patrol (Bandoleros, The Deserter, Dangerous Allies, nos. 271–273), at that time holding the rank of lieutenant. Tex and the Pards, caught in a snowstorm, first encounter his brother, Sergeant Clark Morrow. Morrow's patrol is wiped out by hired killers, and only the sergeant survives, confessing to the Pards that his brother is a weapons expert and the designer of a revolutionary repeating rifle which, disappointed at seeing the project rejected by the War Ministry under pressure from industrialists, he decides to desert and sell to the Mexicans - the reason for the attack in the mountains. Tex and Tiger track George down in Pequeño Paraíso, a village of outlaws just beyond the border, and persuade him to retrace his steps. The Mexicans, angered by Morrow's decision, besiege the shack where the lieutenant is with Tex and Tiger Jack with rifle and cannon fire. The three men are saved by the band of the outlaw Manuel Pedroza, leader of the village. Lieutenant Morrow is later promoted to captain and transferred to Arizona, from where (Desperados!, in The Night of Ambushes, The Legend of the Old Mission, The Curse of Escondida, nos. 333–335) he contacts Tex to inform him that Manuel Pedroza - who, after saving Tex, Morrow, and Tiger, had fled with the twenty thousand dollars Morrow had obtained by selling the rifle - has resumed raiding the mining villages in the area before retreating across the border. Morrow's third appearance, now as a major, occurs in the story Young Assassins (nos. 640–642), in which he informs Tex of Kid Rodelo's escape from the prison of Yuma.

=== Main enemies or recurring ===
- Lily Dickart makes her first appearance in issue no. 3 of Tex, titled Outlaw, alongside her brother Steve (Mefisto), where she performs her first role as a spy in the arms trade with Mexico that the two managed under the cover of their artistic activity. The continuous exchange of weapons soon led to a guerrilla conflict in which Tex intervened, causing the two siblings to flee and placing the blame for one of their crimes on the Ranger. Tex soon manages to recapture the two and hand them over to justice, which has them imprisoned. In issue no. 501, titled Mefisto!, much later, Dickart reappears in Paris, alongside a singular aristocrat, half refined decadent and half unpredictable adventurer, Count Boris Leonov. Lily becomes acquainted with an Indian master of occult arts, capable of bringing the dead back to life, and asks him to resurrect her brother Mefisto so that he may finally take revenge on Tex and his Pards. After bringing him back to life, Lily is ultimately arrested again, but she manages to help her brother escape.
- La Mano Rossa (The Red Hand), a criminal cartel of five people, and the first enemies faced by Tex. Its members are called Stone, Burke, Welles, Topler, and Randall; Mr. Bannion, a banker, is their informant.
- Fred Brennan and Jim Teller, two Arizonian businessmen who used to sell guns and whiskey to Navajos; seeking revenge upon Tex for having taken down their business, they send smallpox-infected blankets to the Navajo village, killing tens of people. As Tex himself is absent from the village with his young son Kit, the two Willers avoid the infection, but the disease kills Lilyth, Tex's wife.
- Mefisto (real name: Steve Dickart): originally an illusionist and a trickster, and secretly a spy working for Mexico, he later forms an alliance with evil powers and underworld demons and becomes a warlock. He has a sister, Lily, and a son, Blacky, later a warlock himself and known as Yama. He is Tex's nemesis and the longest-running antagonist of the entire saga, having debuted (as a mere illusionist) in volume 3 (Fuorilegge, "Outlaw", 1964) and having appeared for the eleventh time in volumes 738 to 744 (all published in 2022).
- Yama (real name: Blacky Dickart) is a powerful warlock, the son of Mefisto, Tex's bitter enemy. Seen four times, Yama inherits his father's powers in volume 125, "Il figlio di Mefisto" ("The Son of Mefisto"), and becomes one of the main antagonists in the saga. Yama is visually presented with a sinister face, little hair, a goatee, and an appearance quite similar to that of his father. He first appears in issue no. 125, titled The Son of Mefisto; in this story his father, buried beneath the ruins of the castle of Baron Samedi and at the mercy of hungry rats, manages to track down his son Blacky - born in the past from a relationship with the fortune-teller Myriam - through his demonic crystal ball. He leaves him the books in which the secrets of his diabolical powers are contained, in exchange for the promise to avenge his death by killing his mortal enemies, namely Tex Willer and his Pards, the ultimate cause of his misfortunes and his imminent and tragic end. Despite the opposition of his mother, with whom he lived, Blacky accepts, taking the pseudonym Yama. After many clashes, Yama is finally defeated by the Pards; however, he is saved by his father's spirit before he can die.
- Proteus (real name: Perry Drayton) is a criminal master of camouflage. He uses his ability to rob trains and banks.
- El Muerto (real name: Paco Ordoñez) is a Mexican pistolero. His face is horribly scarred as a consequence of having been burned by in a fire, which gains him the nickname El Muerto (Spanish for 'the Dead [one, man]'). El Muerto takes revenge on Tex because, in the past, the ranger killed his older brothers, both outlaws, robbers and killers.
- Ruby Scott is a character created by Giovanni Luigi Bonelli and visually by Galep. He is famous for being, in seventy years of the character's history, the only one to have defeated the protagonist in a duel, although this happened thanks to a trick. Issues 98 (in the episode Silver Bell, a story that follows The Raiders) and 99 (The Defeat) of Tex show the hero struggling against Freddie Baker, the young scion of the rich owner of a ranch located near Silver Bell. In issue no. 99 Scott makes his true debut. The Bakers, struck by Tex, intend to make the ranger pay, who in the meantime has eliminated all the gunmen in their service. In order to make Tex pay for the affront, they therefore decide to hire a new gunman, the half-breed Ruby Scott, who fights the duel using a trick: revolving holsters. In practice, he can shoot without drawing his pistols. With this unfair ruse Scott defeats Tex, seriously wounding him. But after recovering, the ranger, who has now understood the trick, confronts and kills his rival. Once the curtain falls, Scott's Native companion eliminates Freddie Baker, and Baker senior, devastated by his son's death and driven mad, sets fire to the ranch and dies in the blaze.
- La Tigre Nera (alias: Prince Sumankan) is an exiled Malay prince from Borneo. His main goal is to collect enough money and an army to reconquer his reign, which was stolen by European colonialists. Tigre Nera is a cunning and ruthless man who, having lost his wealth because of the whites, emigrates from his native Malaysia to the United States to fight them, helped by Chinese, Black people, and wealthy corrupt whites. Tex and the Pards are summoned to Leadville by the Pinkerton agent Mac Parland to confront the Tigre Nera, who is defeated but escapes together with the beautiful Lohana, swearing revenge. The Tigre Nera returns in issue no. 587, titled The Tiger's Claw. This time Prince Sumankan settles in San Francisco, where he runs a large opium trafficking operation. The police chief, Tom Devlin, calls his friends Tex and Carson, because he intends to immediately track down all the dealers. From the first clues it is immediately discovered that the organization is led by the Tigre Nera, determined to take revenge on the rangers once and for all. In issue no. 588, titled The Black Castle, Tex and Carson, after an ambush, find themselves separated. The Tigre Nera engages in hand-to-hand combat with Tex on the top of a cliff and seems to have the upper hand. Struck by a rifle shot fired by the arriving Devlin to save Tex, it is instead Sumankan who falls from the cliff and apparently loses his life. Some of the Tigre Nera's Chinese allies flee, while others surrender to the police. Tex asks Devlin to be merciful toward Lohana, who is sent back to Florida. However, the Tiger never died, and after re-establishing contact with Lohana, the sorcerer Omoro, and Jeffure, he again causes many problems for the rangers, summoned by Mac Parland and Nat Mac Kennet. The Tiger kidnaps Kit Willer, who becomes friends with Sumankan's son. Omoro and Jeffure die, and after two more issues Lohana sacrifices herself for her master, who then dies at the hands of the foreign usurper, revealing that Tex is the better man.
- Il Maestro (real name: Andrew Liddell) is a mad scientist and a chemical genius, who tries to blackmail the cities of San Francisco, New Orleans, and New York, under the menace of a lethal poison he develops. After his first battle against Tex, he is infected with his own poison, leaving him scarred for life.
- Jack Thunder, a blind gunslinger who leads a group of psychotic killers to Heaven, where Lena and Donna Parker reside.
  - Jack Thunders' Family: Thunder, a loner and a former Confederate soldier, has a gang which he refers to as his "Family": Jeremy Monk, a hunchback and a former schoolteacher; Hammer, a giant black man who wields a huge hammer; Lizard, a trapper, and his two cannibalistic Molossus dogs; Firebird, a Native (of an unspecified tribe) and a pyromaniac; No-Face, a mysterious man, mute and deaf, who covers his face with a leather mask; and Kid Rodelo, a seventeen-year-old pistolero and serial killer.
- Zhenda is a witch who in the past belonged to the Navajo tribe, but was banished from the tribe by Tex for drugging young Navajos in order to subjugate their will. It is said that Zhenda has been the lover of Red Arrow, and that her son Sagua was born from this relationship and consequently is the legitimate claimant to the role of tribal chief. Her appearance is narrated in issue no. 70, in the episode Sinister Omens (a story that follows The Last Charge); in this story, Zhenda demands from the outset to make her son Sagua chief of the Navajo tribe and to do so is even willing to kill. After killing her son's wife, Zhenda is defeated by him, but the two reconcile and withdraw into exile in the mountains.
- The Arctic People are a mysterious, primitive and cannibalistic tribe of people who live in the Arctic circle; insofar, they are confirmed to live in Alaska and in the northern territories of Canada.

== Powers and abilities ==
Tex Willer has no superpowers, but he possesses physical abilities such as exceptional endurance and recovery capacity from wounds. A hero with notable hand-to-hand combat skills, he is also endowed with unfailing aim, both with his preferred Colt .45 revolvers and with Winchester rifles.

=== Physical abilities ===
He possesses exceptional toughness which, among other things, allows him to endure torture without complaining; he has been struck innumerable times, mainly grazing wounds to the head and upper limbs, but without suffering serious consequences and usually recovering in a very short time.

Skilled in wrestling and boxing, he is able to face opponents physically stronger than himself in frequent brawls. He is also a true champion in Indian duels with knife or hatchet (which he nevertheless tends to conclude, if possible, without bloodshed, instead knocking the opponent down with punches) and is extremely adept at learning new combat techniques.

=== Tactical skills and use of weapons ===
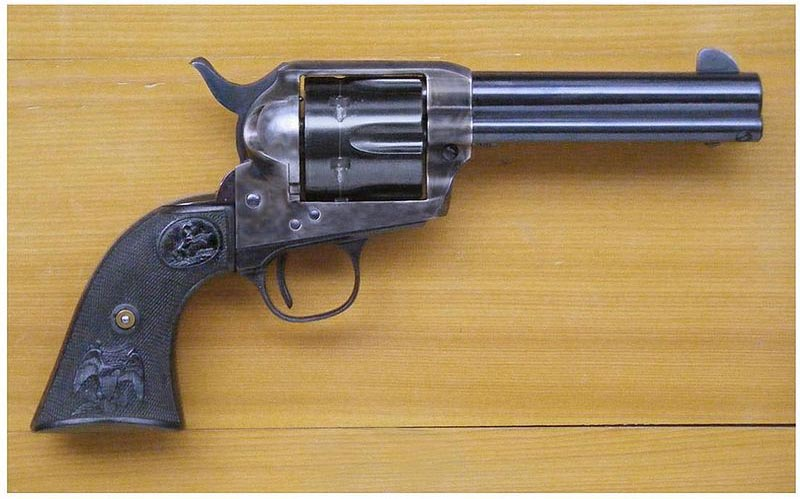
Colt Peacemaker in use in the period in which the comic is set

Despite having no superpowers, he is an unbeatable gunman, and the weapons he usually employs are the following:

- two Colt .45 revolvers, handled with equal skill as he is ambidextrous, which he uses in duels and close-range gunfights. Although practically invincible, even against multiple opponents, he was once defeated in a duel by Ruby Scott; however, the opponent resorted to a trick, having a rotating holster ("swivel") and therefore being able to fire without drawing the pistol. After recovering from his wounds, Tex faced Ruby Scott again and defeated him.
- a Winchester rifle, which he uses to hit targets even at great distance, always with exceptional accuracy.
- a knife, kept in a sheath behind his belt or on his back, hidden under his shirt, used in close combat and often thrown with notable precision; for emergencies, such as cutting the ropes binding his wrists, he keeps a blade in the heel of his boots.
- a bow and arrows, whose use, although occasional, he demonstrated skill in even before meeting the Navajo, from whom he also learned to throw the tomahawk.

Less frequently, when necessary, Tex has used Howitzer cannons, Gatling machine guns, and especially sticks of dynamite. A skilled strategist, despite not having attended military academies, in several situations he shows notable competence in preparing strategic plans and organizing traps or ambushes; however, rather than formal military tactics he tends to rely on guerrilla techniques learned in the field from Native Americans, from whom he also learned other skills such as recognising tracks and animal calls.

=== Other abilities ===
The character is a horseman, also thanks to having learned Navajo techniques: he is able to ride and shoot simultaneously and can tame any horse; one of these, Dynamite, would become his faithful mount for many years. He is also a skilled poker player.

== Authors ==
- Giancarlo Berardi
- Gian Luigi Bonelli
- Sergio Bonelli
- Mauro Boselli
- Decio Canzio
- Tito Faraci
- Gianfranco Manfredi
- Michele Medda
- Claudio Nizzi
- Pasquale Ruju
- Antonio Segura

== Illustrators ==
- Jordi Bernet
- Jesús Blasco
- Guido Buzzelli
- Renzo Calegari
- Aldo Capitanio
- Raul and Gianluca Cestaro
- Fabio Civitelli
- Franco Crivelli
- Víctor de la Fuente
- Pasquale Del Vecchio
- Raffaele Della Monica
- Roberto Diso
- Lucio Filuppucci
- Alfonso Font
- Fernando Fusco
- Aurelio Galleppini
- Francesco Gamba
- Ernesto García Seijas
- Alarico Gattia
- Alberto Giolitti
- Joe Kubert
- Guglielmo Letteri
- Carlo Raffaele Marcello
- Ivo Milazzo
- Vincenzo Monti
- Virgilio Muzzi
- Erio Nicolò
- José Ortiz
- Goran Parlov
- Roberto Raviola
- Miguel Angel Repetto
- Rossano Rossi
- Massimo Rotundo
- Manfred Sommer
- Erasmo Dante Spada
- Giovanni Ticci
- Mario Uggeri
- Claudio Villa
- Colin Wilson
- Sergio Zaniboni
- R. M. Guéra

== Publishing history ==
The character debuted in a self-titled series published by Edizioni Audace in the strip format (16.5 × 8 cm) typical of the period within the Collana del Tex, of which a total of 973 issues were published, divided into 36 series, with weekly periodicity from 1948 to 1967.

The series of unpublished stories continued in a collection in the "Gigante" format, which included three strips per page, debuting in 1958 by fully reprinting the episodes published in the strip series — which was still being published at the time — and then beginning to publish new stories, as the growing success of the collection convinced the publisher to focus on this format, abandoning the strip format.

Meanwhile, from issue no. 22 the publication changed its name from Serie gigante to Collana Tex gigante and, from issue no. 162, it assumed the definitive title Tex.

Since 2018, the publisher has released a new series of unpublished stories dedicated to the character’s past in the series Tex Willer.

=== Foreign versions ===
Tex Willer as he appeared in Lion Comics.

In Brazil, Tex has been published uninterruptedly since 1971. Currently, it is published by Mythos Editora.

In Finland, Tex Willer was published from 1953 to 1965. After a break of five years, Tex Willer has been published continuously since 1971. The series is still popular and 16 issues are published a year.

In India, Tex was published in the 1980s by the South Indian Tamil Comics publisher Lion Comics. The series is regularly published in Lion Comics due to its wide popularity across generations.

In former Yugoslavia, Tex was published in the late 1960s, 1970s, 1980s and early 1990s, and was very popular among other Bonelli characters such as Zagor. In the 1990s after the break-up of Yugoslavia, Tex Willer began to be published in Croatia, Serbia, and Slovenia.

In Turkey, Tex was published by a large number of publishers and it is still being published in irregular hardcover book formats. Ceylan Yayınları (1961–1969, 1978–1986), Zuhal Yayınları (1970–1978), Inter, Alfa Yayıncılık (1991), Galaksi Yayıncılık, Doğan/Egmont (AD, DE – 1996), Aksoy Yayınları (2000), Maceraperest (200? - ), and Oğlak Yayınları are the series' Turkish publishers.

In the United Kingdom, fourteen Tex Willer albums have been published monthly since 1971 by Top Sellers Ltd.

In the United States, Tex Willer appeared in an original book called The Four Killers, later published as Tex: The Lonesome Rider, written by Claudio Nizzi and illustrated by American comic artist Joe Kubert; it was published by Dark Horse Comics and Strip Art Features. Additional issues were also published in the USA by Epicenter Comics, with the stories and graphic novels Tex: Patagonia in 2017, Tex: The Magnificent Outlaw, Tex: In the Land of the Seminoles and the Zagor crossover Tex & Zagor: Bandera in 2022, and Tex: Captain Jack in 2023.

== Other media ==
Attempts had been made to adapt Tex into a film in the late 1960s and early 1970s in Italy. The film was eventually made in 1985 by director Duccio Tessari as Tex and the Lord of the Deep. The film was adapted from three Tex comics: El Morisco, Sierra Encantada and Il signore dell'abisso. The film was intended as a pilot for a television series, but poor critical and box office reception of the film led to no television series being produced.

== Future developments ==
On two separate occasions, passages suggesting a possible epilogue to the Tex saga have been proposed. The first hypothetical version is presented in the novel Tex Willer – Il romanzo della mia vita, which recounts an interview with Tex, now aged 61, conducted in 1899 by the journalist Jack Granger, who travels to the Navajo reservation to hear the ranger’s story directly from him. It is revealed that alongside Lilyth now rests his friend Kit Carson, and that Tex is about to join his son Kit together with Tiger Jack for a new adventure. Aquila della Notte avoids some of Granger’s questions concerning the fate of Mefisto, Montales, El Morisco, and Jim Brandon, promising that he would mention them on a future occasion.

The second version is presented in the out-of-series volume L'eroe e la leggenda, in which a supposedly still-living Carson appears, but very elderly: the setting is in fact the twentieth century. The self-proclaimed Carson is a guest in a retirement home in New York and recounts to a writer, whose surname is Bonelli, the anecdote of his first meeting with his friend. It is incidentally revealed that Tex is supposed to have died, although Carson does not explain anything about the event. Nor are the reasons revealed that led the old ranger so far from Arizona, or what became of the other two pards with whom he had lived for years.

== See also ==
- Morgan Kane
- For a non-exhaustive list of Italian authors, see List of comic creators
- For a non-exhaustive list of Italian comic books, see List of comic books

== Bibliography ==
- Cecchini, Denny (1993). Tex: dalla a alla zeta. Salerno: Alessandro Tesauro Editore.
- Brunoro, Gianni (1994). Tex e il sogno continua. Alberto Gedda; Giovan Battista Verger. Torino: Edizioni d'Arte Lo Scarabeo. ISBN 88-86131-11-9.
- Curti, Roberto (2016). Diabolika: Supercriminals, Superheroes and the Comic Book Universe in Italian Cinema. Midnight Marquee Press. ISBN 978-1-936168-60-6.
- Detti, Ermanno (1994). Storia e storie di Tex. Daniela Parolai. Edizioni Anicia. ISBN 88-7346-098-4.
- Plazzi, Andrea (1996). Al servizio dell'Eroe. Il Tex di Magnus. Edoardo Rosati. Bologna: Editrice Punto Zero. ISBN 88-86945-00-0.
- Lillo Gullo, Profumi trentini nell'America di Galep, in AA.VV., I cinquant'anni di Tex, Omaggio ad Aurelio Galleppini (Presentazione di Sergio Bonelli), Trento, Comune di Trento, 1998
- Mantegazza, Raffaele (1998). Io sparo positivo. Istruzioni per l'uso di Tex Willer. Brunetto Salvarani. Milano: Unicopli. ISBN 88-400-0473-4.
- Scaringi, Carlo (1998). Tex Superstar. Napoli: Gremese Editore. ISBN 88-7742-258-0.
- Sangiorgio, Aurelio (1998). In viaggio con Tex. La geografia del Far West in cinquant'anni di avventure del piu famoso personaggio del fumetto italiano. Il Minotauro. ISBN 88-8073-041-X.
- Bono, Gianni (1998). Tex - Un eroe per amico. Leonardo Gori. Milano: Federico Motta Editore. ISBN 88-7179-166-5.
- Giuseppe Pollicelli (1998). CinquanTex. Torino: Edizioni Lo Scarabeo. ISBN 88-86131-53-4.
- Horn, Maurice (1998). Sotto il segno di Tex. Alessandro Tesauro Editore.
- Domenico Mercuri, Tex, i miei primi 50 anni, San Giovanni in Persiceto, Editoriale Mercury, 1998-2006. (9 volumi).
- Moreno Burattini; Francesco Manetti; Giovanni Battista Verger, Cavalcando con Tex. Cinquant'anni di personaggi e ambienti nelle avventure di Aquila della Notte, Torino, Edizioni Little Nemo, 1999-2001. (5 volumi)
- Sangiorgio, Aurelio (2001). Atlante di Tex. Roma: Il Minotauro. ISBN 88-8073-063-0.
- Tentori, Antonio (2003). Silenzio! Parla Tex. Massime, pensieri e filosofia del piu amato ranger del West. Roma: Castelvecchi. ISBN 88-8210-103-7.
- Paglieri, Claudio (2008). Non son degno di Tex. Vita morti e miracoli del mitico ranger (2 ed.). Venezia: Marsilio. ISBN 88-317-9204-0.
- Bonelli, Sergio (2008). Come Tex non c'e nessuno. Fausto Busatta. Milano: Arnoldo Mondadori. ISBN 88-04-58378-9.
- Fattori, Adolfo (2008). Carmine Treanni (ed.). Per il West, oltre il tramonto. Tex Willer e il suo immaginario. Cassino: Cagliostro ePress. ISBN 88-95114-10-8.
- Mondillo, Antonio (2008). Tex tra mito e storia. Battipaglia: Alessandro Tesauro Editore. ISBN 88-95479-15-7.
- Genovese, Renato (2009). L'avventurosa storia del fumetto italiano. Quarant'anni di fumetti nelle voci dei protagonisti. Roma: Alberto Castelvecchi Editore. ISBN 978-88-7615-346-4.
- Gaspa, Pier Luigi (2010). L'Audace Bonelli. L'avventura del fumetto italiano. Napoli: Comicon. ISBN 88-88869-23-9.
- Boselli, Mauro (2011). Tex Willer. Il romanzo della mia vita. Milano: Arnoldo Mondadori. ISBN 978-88-04-60856-1.
- De Falco, Raffaele (2013). Tex. Fiumi di china italiana in deserti americani. Battipaglia: Nicola Pesce Editore. ISBN 88-97141-21-8.
- Bargioni Rudi, Lucotti Ercole, Tex Willer, Gammalibri, Milano, 1979.
- Aurelio Sugliani, Tex Willer. Tra mito e archetipo, Amazon Editore, 2019.
- Giorello, Giulio (2020). La filosofia di Tex e altri saggi: Dal fumetto alla scienza. Mimesis. ISBN 978-88-575-7129-4.
