= Alessandro Bignamini =

Italian comic book artist

Alessandro Bignamini (born November 24, 1970) is an Italian comic book artist, mostly known for his work on Mister No, Brad Barron, Greystorm and Orfani series.

== Biography ==
Bignamini was born in Milan, northern Italy.

After the artistic high school, he attended the Comics college in Milan (Scuola del Fumetto di Milano). He began professional career in 1990, drawing for magazines Fumo di China and Comic Art. Starting from 1992 he collaborated with Intrepido, drawing several short stories. He also illustrated, four episodes of the "Orazio Brown" series.

He became a staff artist in Sergio Bonelli Editore in 1994, working on Mister No, Brad Barron (since 2005), Graystorm (since 2009) and Orfani (2013) series.
