= Gallieno Ferri =

Italian comic book artist (1929–2016)

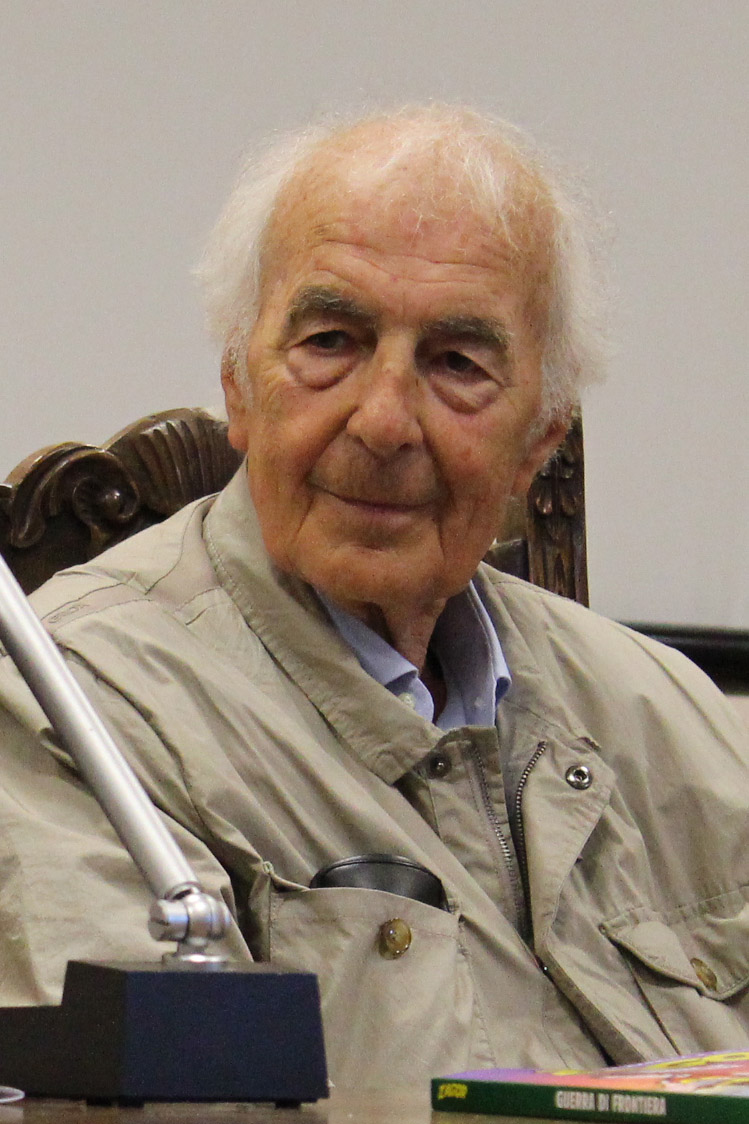
Gallieno Ferri, 2013

Gallieno Ferri (21 March 1929 – 2 April 2016) was an Italian comic book artist and illustrator. He was born in Genoa.

In 1960, Ferri met writer Sergio Bonelli and they created the comic book Zagor. Ferri illustrated Zagor from the first issue, drawing numerous stories. He also illustrated all the covers of the regular series.

In 1975, when another character, Mister No, was first introduced, also written by Sergio Bonelli, Ferri illustrated numbers #1 and #2 of the regular series, and designed the cover illustrations for numbers #1 through #115. Other characters created by Ferri include Maskar, Thunder Jack, Jim Puma and Capitan Walte.
