= Ade Capone =

Italian comic book writer

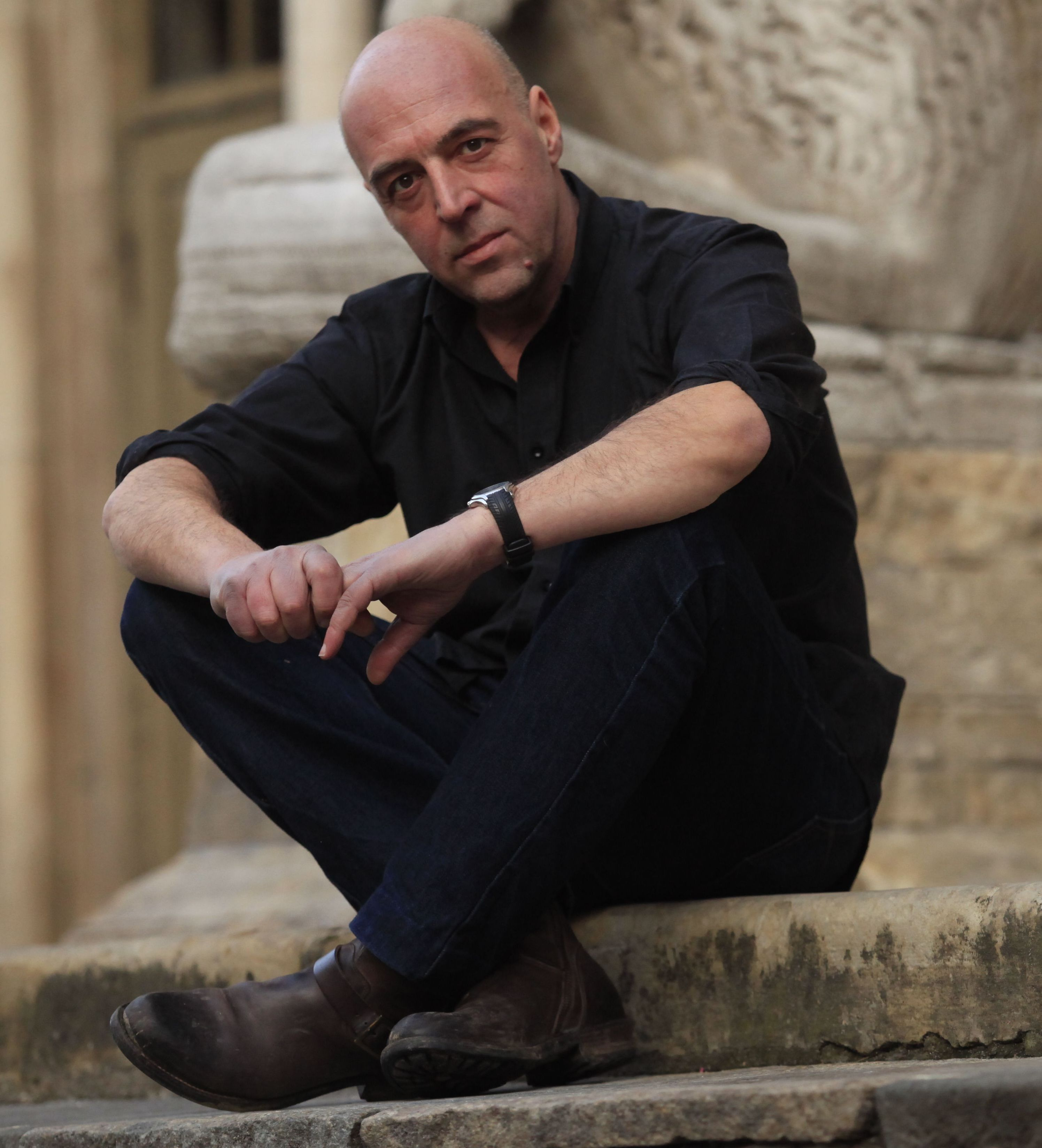
Ade Capone in 2013

Ade Capone (26 December 1958, in Piacenza – 4 February 2015, in Salsomaggiore Terme) was an Italian comic book writer. He is perhaps best known for having written many stories for the comic book Zagor and as the creator of the comic book Lazarus Ledd.

== Works ==
- Zagor # 263, 264, 265, 289, 290, 291, 294, 295, 296, 307, 308, 309, 310, 316, 325, 326, 327, 330, 331, 501, 502, 503, 519, 520, 521, Maxi 7, Maxi12, Maxi 19
- Mister No #128, 129, 130
- Martin Mystere #126, 127
