= Sergio Bonelli =

Italian comic book writer and publisher

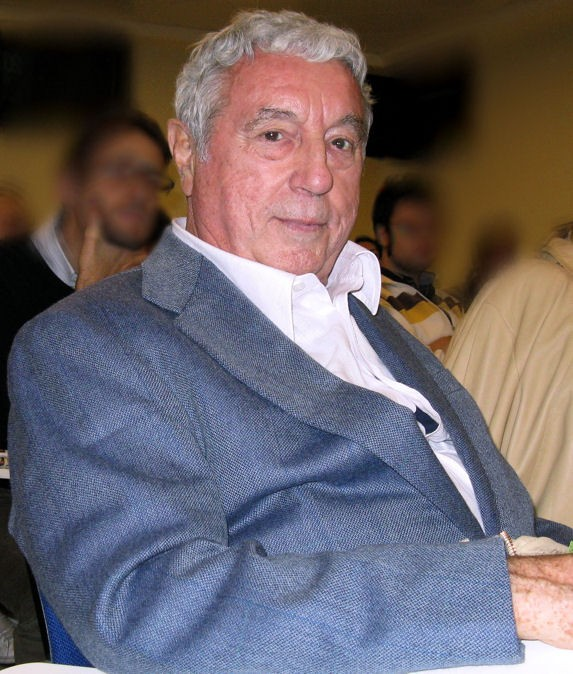
- Sergio Bonelli in 2009.
- Born: 2 December 1932 Milan, Italy
- Died: 26 September 2011 (aged 78) Monza, Italy
- Area: Writer
- Pseudonym: Guido Nolitta
- Notable works: Zagor; Mister No; Sergio Bonelli Editore
- Awards: U Giancu's Prize, 1996

Sergio Bonelli (2 December 1932 – 26 September 2011) was an Italian comic book writer and publisher. He is best known as the creator of Zagor (1961) and Mister No (1975), as well as a comics publisher through the publishing house Sergio Bonelli Editore.

He was born in Milan, the son of Gian Luigi Bonelli, the creator of Tex Willer and many other Italian comic strips. In order to distinguish himself from his father, he usually wrote his scripts under the pen name Guido Nolitta. He made his debut as a scriptwriter in 1957, with the translation into Italian of the Spanish series Verdugo Ranch, for which he wrote the final episode (artwork by Franco Bignotti). In 1958, Bonelli created his first character Un ragazzo nel Far West ('A boy in the Far West'), also illustrated by Franco Bignotti. In the late 1950s and early 1960s, he wrote several episodes of Piccolo Ranger.

In 1960, Bonelli wrote Il Giudice Bean, a mini-series of six adventures, illustrated by Sergio Tarquinio. In the same year, he met the illustrator Gallieno Ferri, with whom he created Zagor in 1961. Bonelli wrote almost all Zagor stories until 1980 (issue #182). In 1975, he created the Mister No series.

In 1977, Bonelli wrote the script of the book L'Uomo del Texas (illustrated by Aurelio Galleppini). He also wrote numerous Tex Willer stories, starting with issue #183 in the late 1970s. In 1990 he created the mini-series River Bill (artwork by Francesco Gamba).

He was chairman of Sergio Bonelli Editore (formerly known as CEPIM), one of Italy's major comics publishers (titles include Tex, Dylan Dog, Mister No and many others).

He died in Monza, on 26 September 2011, following a short illness.
