= Marcello Toninelli =

Italian comics writer (born 1950)

- Born: 25 June 1950 (age 76)
- Area: Writer
- Notable works: Zagor

Marcello Toninelli (born 25 June 1950) is an Italian comics writer, best known as main writer of series of Zagor between 1982 and 1993.

== Biography ==
Toninelli began a collaboration with Sergio Bonelli Editore in 1982, and worked on the Zagor series. Toninelli was the main writer of series from number #203 until #334 in 1993. He also wrote first 3 editions of Speciale Zagor. For Bonelli he also wrote and episodes of Piccolo Ranger, Dylan Dog, Nick Raider and Kerry il Trapper.

== Bibliography ==
Comics work includes:

- Zagor #203 204 205 212 213 214 215 216 217 218 219 220 221 223 224 225 226 229 230 231 232 233 234 236 237 238 239 240 241 242 243 244 247 248 253 254 255 256 257 258 260 261 262 263 265 266 267 268 269 270 271 272 273 274 275 282 283 284 285 286 287 288 289 291 292 293 296 297 298 299 300 301 302 303 304 305 306 307 313 314 315 316 317 318 321 322 332 333 334 Speciale Zagor 1 Speciale Zagor 2 Speciale Zagor 3
- Dylan Dog #21 and #44
- Nick Raider #42
