= Gian Luigi Bonelli =

Italian comic book author and publisher (1908-2001)

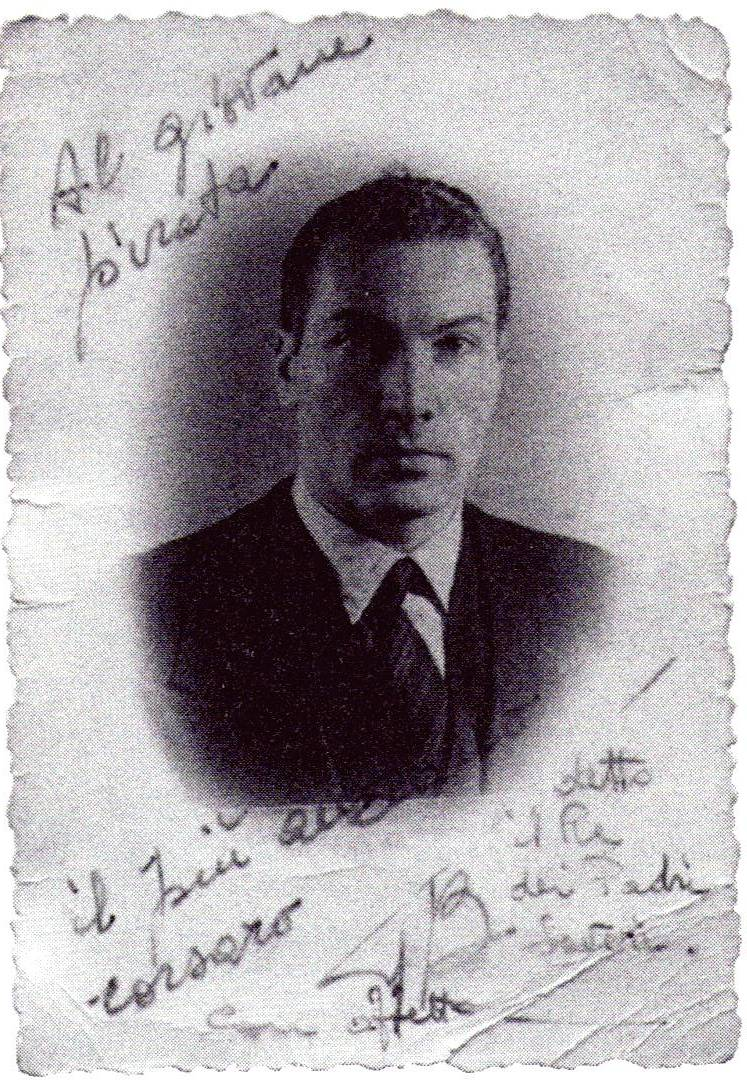
- Gianluigi Bonelli in 40s
- Born: Giovanni Luigi Bonelli; 22 December 1908 Milan, Italy
- Died: 12 January 2001 (aged 92) Alessandria, Italy
- Areas: Writer, Publisher
- Notable works: Sergio Bonelli Editore; Tex Willer
- Collaborators: Aurelio Galleppini
- Relatives: Sergio Bonelli

Giovanni Luigi Bonelli (22 December 1908 – 12 January 2001) was an Italian comic book author and publisher, best remembered as the co-creator of Tex Willer in 1948, together with artist Aurelio Galleppini.

== Career ==
Bonelli was born in Milan. He founded Casa Audace Editrice, later to be known as Sergio Bonelli Editore, in 1940.

In 1948, he created Occhio Cupo and Tex Willer (both drawn by Galleppini). Tex Willer is among the most popular characters of Italian comics, with translations into numerous languages all around the world.

He wrote several early episodes of Zagor (issues #6–10, 13–14). Bonelli remained to supervise the production of Tex until his death in Alessandria. His son Sergio Bonelli (1932–2011) was also a comic book writer, as well as a publisher of comics.
