= Aldo Capitanio =

Italian comic book artist

- Born: May 28, 1952 Camisano Vicentino (Veneto)
- Died: September 19, 2001 (aged 49)
- Area: Artist

Aldo Capitanio (May 28, 1952 – September 19, 2001) was an Italian comic book artist.

He was born in Camisano Vicentino (Veneto). After obtaining a degree at the Institute of Arts and Crafts in Padua, he debuted as artist in 1970 on the periodical Il Santo dei Miracoli. Two years later he was published on Luciano Secchi's Eureka, and, in 1973, he became a collaborator of Il Giornalino, for which he realized adventure stories. In the 1970s he also provided art for some episodes of Enzo Biagi's History of Italy in Comics.

In the 1980s he started to collaborate for Sergio Bonelli Editore, Italy's most important comics publisher. After several episodes of Nick Raider, he became part of the regular staff of Tex.

Capitanio was renowned for his taste for details and his love for Middle Ages settings. He died in 2001, aged 49.
