= Alessandro Bilotta =

Italian author of short fiction, comic books, graphic novels and films

- Born: Alessandro Bilotta; 17 August 1977 (age 49) Rome, Italy
- Area: Writer
- Notable works: Batman; Dylan Dog; Mercurio Loi; Gli Uomini della Settimana; Valter Buio; La Dottrina; Romano; Corsari di classe Y
- Awards: Gran Guinigi Award; Attilio Micheluzzi Award; Fumo di China Award

Alessandro Bilotta (born 17 August 1977) is an Italian author of short fiction, comic books, graphic novels and films. His works include the dystopian Futurism-influenced graphic novel La Dottrina, and the comic book series Mercurio Loi. Besides authoring many issues for Dylan Dog, he created his own spin-off series, Il Pianeta dei Morti.

In 2021 Bilotta wrote Ianus, a Batman story set in Rome, for Batman: The World, an anthology of Batman stories by international comic-book artists. Each of which will take place in their home countries.

== Career ==
=== Comics ===
Since the 90s Bilotta has created a plethora of comic-book series in Italy and in France. His twenty-year-old partnership with DC and Marvel artist Carmine Di Giandomenico led him to create the Italian steampunk comic book Le strabilianti vicende di Giulio Maraviglia, followed by Romano, published by 'Vents d'Ouest', and La Dottrina, republished in 2019 in a deluxe edition by Feltrinelli.

He is currently one of the main writers of Dylan Dog, the best-selling award-winning horror comic-book series, for which he created the Il Pianeta dei Morti spin-off. His first independent series, Valter Buio, about a shrink for ghosts who operates in the very heart of Rome, was followed by Mercurio Loi, a professor flâneur who solves all sorts of crimes apparently just by getting lost in Rome's alleys.

Mercurio Loi is the most award-winning Italian one-year run comic-book series ever. In a single run of just sixteen issues Mercurio Loi collected all the awards in the comic-book field: U Giancu, Micheluzzi, ANAFI, Boscarato, Gran Guinigi and the Golden Romics.

Mercurio Loi is a brilliant history professor, a Roman gentleman, and a flâneur, a dandy who wanders idly through the alleyways of 19th century Rome. Reminiscent of the spirit of G.K. Chesterton's Father Brown, Professor Loi ends up being involved in mysterious events, diabolical machinations and secret societies, whose convoluted charades he unravels with good-humoured acumen.

=== Film and screenwriting ===
Bilotta worked as a screenwriter and story editor for the Winx Club franchise, co-writing (uncredited) such films as The Secret of the Lost Kingdom (Rainbow 2007) besides story editing and writing for the fourth season of Winx and PopPixie.
