= Aurelio Galleppini =

Italian painter

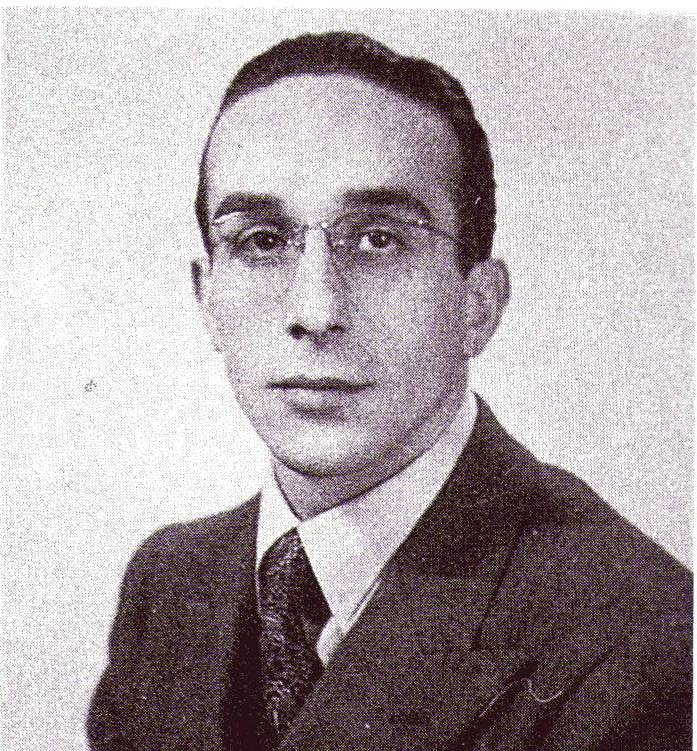
- Aurelio Galleppini, 1948
- Born: 28 August 1917 Casale di Pari, Italy
- Died: 10 March 1994 (aged 76) Chiavari, Italy
- Area: Artist
- Pseudonym: Galep
- Notable works: Tex Willer
- Collaborators: Gian Luigi Bonelli
- Awards: U Giancu's Prize, 1993

Aurelio Galleppini (28 August 1917 – 10 March 1994), better known with his nickname Galep, was an Italian comics artist and illustrator, best known as graphic creator of Tex Willer in 1948.

== Biography ==
Galleppini was born at Casale di Pari in Tuscany to Sardinian parents.

In 1948 Gallepini created Occhio Cupo and Tex Willer (both written by Gian Luigi Bonelli). Galep drew Tex Willer's adventures from 1948 until his death. Many other illustrators alternated with him on the pages of this popular comic book. He also illustrated all the covers of the regular series from the issue 1# in 1948 until issue #400 in 1994. In 1977 he drew episode of L'Uomo del Texas, which was written by Sergio Bonelli, for the series Un uomo, un'avventura ("A man, an Adventure").

He died at Chiavari in 1994.

== Tex Willer ==
- Galleppini drew Tex Willer issues #1–40, 42–90, 92–100, 103–106, 113– 117, 125–128, 134, 137–139, 154–156, 162–164, 175–176, 180–183, 190– 191, 200, 207–209, 223–226, 242–245, 265–268, 276–277, 287–289, 300, 312–314, 338–340, 377–378, 400; and Speciale Tex #3
