= Mister No =

Publication information
- Publisher: Sergio Bonelli Editore
- Created by: Sergio Bonelli; Gallieno Ferri

In-story information
- Alter ego: Jerry Drake

Mister No is an Italian comic book, first published in Italy in Spring 1975 by Sergio Bonelli Editore.

The character Mister No was created by writer Sergio Bonelli and artist Gallieno Ferri. Bonelli published under the pseudonym Guido Nolitta. The regular monthly series endured for 379 publications, and the last issue was published in December 2006. Three special issues were made from 2006 to 2009.

== General description ==
The first story is set in 1952, a few years after the end of the Second World War, and the last was set in 1969. Issue 295 featured a story set in Manaus during year 2000. The special issue number 8 featured a story with Martin Mystère.

Mister No's real name is Jerome Drake Junior, his father being Jerome Senior, and he was born c. 1922. He is a former soldier who served in the United States Army. After the Second World War he moved to Manaus, in the middle of the Brazilian Amazon Forest to escape from the horrors of the war. Half hero, half anti-hero, he fights for his own peace and tranquility which he hopes to gain in those wild territories.

He works as an aeroplane pilot and tour guide, flying his Piper. His best friend is the German Otto Kruger, whom he first met in São Luís. Otto was nicknamed Esse-Esse (S-S) by Brazilians because of his past as an officer in the Nazi German Army. Mister No, like Esse-Esse, is a lazy man who likes hanging around in Paulo Adolfo's cantina, drinking cachaça and flirting with girls, and he often gets involved in dangerous activities and trouble against his will.

Although many of Mister No's adventures take place in Brazil, some are set in other Latin American countries, North America, Europe, Africa and Asia.

Mister No is very popular in Italy, France, Turkey, Greece and the countries of the former Yugoslavia (especially Croatia, Serbia, Bosnia and Herzegovina, Montenegro, and North Macedonia) where the comic book is currently being published and distributed by Serbian edition Veseli Četvrtak, Croatian Strip-Agent and Libellus.

== Authors ==
Other than Bonelli and Ferri, many other artists and authors have contributed to the series. These include the writers Alfredo Castelli, Tiziano Sclavi, and Claudio Nizzi; and the artists Franco Bignotti, Roberto Diso, Marco Bianchini, Fabio Civitelli, Ferdinando Tacconi and Alessandro Bignamini.

In the last issue it was announced that the series will continue in the annual specials. But these have also been suspended after the issue of Spring 2009.
