= Zagor (comics) =

Italian comic book

Publication information
- Publisher: Sergio Bonelli Editore
- First appearance: 1961
- Created by: Sergio Bonelli; Gallieno Ferri

In-story information
- Alter ego: Patrick Wilding
- Notable aliases: Zagor, Za-Gor-Te-Nay, Spirit with the Hatchet
- Abilities: strength, agility, master acrobat, formidable gunfighter, infallible with hatchet

Zagor is an Italian comic book created by editor and writer Sergio Bonelli (pseudonym Guido Nolitta) and artist Gallieno Ferri. Zagor was first published in Italy by Sergio Bonelli Editore in 1961.

== Character ==
Zagor's real name is Patrick Wilding, the son of Mike and Betty. He is a western-tarzanesque character living in a fictional forest named Darkwood, located in Pennsylvania, north eastern United States. His name Zagor comes from his Indian name "Za-Gor Te-Nay", whose fictional meaning is "The Spirit with the Hatchet". Though the writers do not mention exact dates, Zagor is supposed to be active during the first half of the 19th century, or around 1825–1830. Zagor fights to maintain peace all over his territory, protecting the Indian tribes and hunting down criminals regardless of their skin color. Son of an army official retiring to live as a pioneer and trapper in the forests of the north-east, Patrick Wilding sees his parents die at the hands of a band of Abenaki Indians, led by Salomon Kinsky. Taken in by the middle-aged trapper nicknamed "Wandering Fitzy", the boy grows up with only one thought on his mind: revenge. Fitzy teaches him how to make a deadly weapon out of a hatchet, and when he is old enough to fulfill his vengeance, Patrick goes on to track down and mercilessly slay his family's assailants. As he is about to enact his revenge on defeated Kinsky, Patrick is presented with the evidence of his father's dark past. Lieutenant Mike Wilding was a ruthless leader of the force which massacred the Abenaki community on the banks of Silver Lake, an event which saw him dishonorably discharged from the army. The attack on the Patrick's home on the shore of Clear Water river was, in fact, a rightful retribution for commander Wilding's wrongdoings. As Kinsky is about to gun down confused and distracted Patrick, Fitzy arrives in time to save the life of his protégé but, in doing so, is mortally wounded and dies in Patrick's arms. The boy's understanding of the relativity of the concepts of good, evil and justice comes in question as he is devastated with pain, grief, confusion and the genocide of his own that mirrors the one committed by Mike Wilding years ago.

To atone for his father's sins, as well as his own, Patrick is compelled to transform himself (with his accomplices the Sullivans, a family of acrobats who are his image makers) into Za-Gor-Te-Nay, shortened to Zagor. He is a kind of avenger always ready to side with the weak and the oppressed, whether red, white or black, whoever they may be. Moving his shack to an island surrounded by quick-sand in a marshy area of Darkwood Forest, Zagor begins his work as a peacemaker. He takes Darkwood tribes under his wing earning himself a distinction of the Lord of Darkwood, beloved and respected by peaceful natives and trappers, and feared and hated by anyone who would endanger the peace between reds and whites. Zagor is not a typical western character, as his stories mix horror and science fiction by side with a bit of humour coming mostly from his sidekick Chico, a short, fat Mexican man who became his best friend. His full name is "Don" Chico Felipe Cayetano Lopez Martinez y Gonzales.

== Abilities ==
Zagor's abilities include almost superhuman strength, agility and endurance. His fighting prowess is extraordinary whether he finds himself in a gunfight or plain brawl. If needed, Zagor is more than capable of dealing with multiple opponents and is basically invincible in a one-on-one bout. In many occasions, he is also seen fighting North American wildlife (such as cougars, alligators and even bears) with nothing more than his hatchet or knife. He is infallible with his oval bladed hatchet, whether he uses it as a melee weapon or as a projectile. Zagor is also shown possessing an incredible speed that, paired with his almost catlike reflexes, often allows him to catch a traveling spear or even an arrow, a feats which usually leave Indians in an awe further solidifying Zagor's status of an emissary of the Great Spirit (a superstition that Zagor uses to his advantage). Zagor can quickly cover great distances using his trademark branch-to-branch way of traveling where he jumps from one treetop to another. His war cry seems to be a roar of an unidentifiable (and presumably horrific) creature. This is one of Zagor's calling cards, the one which usually leaves wrongdoers in a frantic state of mind.

Throughout the series, it is strongly suggested that Zagor, although not a demi-god that he claims to be, is indeed in Manitou's good graces and on more than few occasions he has served as a champion of heavens against the forces of evil drawing his strength from the divine intervention (best example being the storyline of Hellingen's Return - episodes #275 through #280). Later stories have also hinted that Zagor's great abilities could come from him being a descendant of an Atlantean royalty or perhaps a reincarnation of an ancient African deity.

Although capable of near-superhuman feats, there were rare instances when Zagor was bested by certain extraordinary individuals. In a contest of skill (trials of power, speed, reflexes, marksmanship, breath-diving and beast-fighting) against multi-talented villain Supermike, Zagor is forced into a seventh round tie-breaker - a life-or-death duel atop of a small platform surrounded by the garden of spikes and daggers (which he, eventually, wins convincingly while even managing to spare the life of an opponent).

== Allies and enemies ==
Notable allies:

Chico (Felipe Cayetano Lopez Martinez y Gonzales) - Short obese bumbling but kindhearted Mexican. He is Zagor's loyal companion and a comic relief throughout the series.

Tonka - Chief of Mohawk tribe and Zagor's blood brother.

Digging Bill - Treasure hunter.

Captain "Fishleg" - Commander of a whaler.

Colonel Norman Perry - Military doctor and influential person in the army brass.

Baron Icarus LaPlume (Feather) - An inventor obsessed with flying who always ends up victim of his own devices.

Drunky Duck - Indian postman whose unorthodox ways of delivering mail infuriate Chico.

"Doc" Lester - Trapper and former dentist. Has an elusive past.

Rochas - Trapper always engaged in fists challenges with Zagor.

Bat Batterton - Private detective who always fails the disguises.

Many Eyes - Shaman which embraces white people's medicine and technology. One of the few Indians to know Zagor's true identity.

Frida Lang - Austrian countess and Zagor's love interest.

Memorable enemies include:

Professor Hellingen - Mad scientist and Zagor's nemesis. Not only that he is capable of creating a doomsday devices but he has also managed to cheat death and return to the land of the living to wreak havoc not once, but twice.

Kandrax - Celtic druid who wields mystical powers.

Mortimer - Scheming genius and a conspirator. Inspired by A. C. Doyle's professor Moriarty.

SuperMike - Man of many talents and abilities and Zagor's evil counterpart.

The Alchemist (Robert Gray) - Terrorist with prosthetic arms and expert in chemical warfare. One of very few persons to defeat Zagor in a fistfight.

One-eyed Jack - Glass-eyed outlaw.

Baron Rakosi - Vampire.

== Popularity outside Italy ==
Even though Zagor is popular in Italy, it is even more popular in Croatia, North Macedonia, Bosnia and Herzegovina and Serbia, where it is being published to this day; his stories are also published in other former Yugoslav republics including Slovenia. In former Yugoslavia, Zagor was published by the Serbian publication Dnevnik in its Zlatna Serija edition from 1968. Although not as popular, Zagor comics are also published in Austria. Zagor has been published in India by Lion Comics in October 2022.

Zagor is one of the most popular comic heroes in Turkey since the 1960s. Two unofficial Zagor movies have been produced in Turkey in 1971, Zagor - Kara Korsan'in hazineleri and Zagor - Kara Bela. Zagor was also published in Greece and in Israel in the 1970s, where, during that time, Tex Willer was published as well.

Since 2015, Epicenter Comics released in the United States the English-language edition of Zagor comics, still ongoing in 2024. The first of the three-part story Zagor! Terror from the Sea was published in 2015, including extra essays, introduction texts and original covers with an exclusive Michele Rubini cover; in 2016, a second Zagor book in English was published, titled "The Red Sand", including essays and texts, with 400 pages and a Rubini cover. The third book "Voodoo Vendetta" was also published in 2016, with three essays. In 2017 a fourth book named "Zagor vs Supermike" was released with a poster celebrating Ferri. They also released a book called: "1000 Faces of Fear" with three different covers by Michele Rubini, Stefano Andreucci and Pasquale Frisenda. The next year was productive for Epicenter Comics, as they published "The Origins" containing comics about Zagor's childhood and young days: "Zagor Story", "Darkwood: Year Zero" and "Rainbow Bridge". Later that year was published: "The Lost World" which was completely drawn by Michele Rubini. It is a hardcovered, A4, B/W book with exclusive illustrations, essays, sketches and an interview with Rubini himself. It has two covers: Rubini's and Martinere's. In 2018 they published "Alien Saga" on more than 700 pages of classic Zagor stories. After "Alien Saga" Epicenter Comics published a new A4 book named "In The Jaws Of Madness". It is the longest single Zagor story ever made. It has three exclusive covers by Rubini, Ferri and Shy. Later they published a book "American Odyssey"; another classical comic book with two covers. Their next book was Donatelli's and Castelli's "The Great Conspiracy", funded with Indiegogo. It also had two special covers. This year they are going to publish another special Zagor book named "In The Shadow Of A Vampire" containing the first two Zagor stories with vampires. Epicenter Comics also published Magic Wind, Dylan Dog, Tex Willer, and Dragonero; it was founded in San Diego, CA by Igor Maricic.

A crossover with DC Comics character The Flash, titled The Flash/Zagor – La scure e il fulmine, was published on March 10, 2022.

== Authors ==
- Sergio Bonelli (pseudonym Guido Nolitta), inventor of the series, main writer of series from number 1 until number 182. He also wrote first 5 editions of Speciale Chico.
- Mauro Boselli, main writer (with Burrattini) of series from number 334
- Moreno Burattini, main writer of series (with Boselli), beginning with number 310
- Decio Canzio, writing for Zagor between numbers 139 and 212
- Ade Capone, writing for Zagor between numbers 263 and 331
- Alfredo Castelli, wrote many stories from number 76 until 229
- Maurizio Colombo, writing for Zagor between numbers 370 and 410
- Luigi Mignacco, writing for Zagor from number 451
- Tiziano Sclavi, wrote many stories from number 184 until 280, and Speciale Chico 6
- Marcello Toninelli, main writer of series from number 203 until 334. He also wrote first 3 editions of Speciale Zagor.

== Illustrators ==
- Gallieno Ferri, artwork creator of character Zagor. He illustrated all the covers of the series. He illustrates Zagor from number 1.
- Stefano Andreucci, illustrates Zagor from number 330
- Franco Bignotti, illustrated many stories of Zagor from number 26 until 247
- Gaetano Cassaro, illustrates Zagor from number 331
- Alessandro Chiarolla, illustrates Zagor from number 355
- Raffaele Della Monica, illustrates Zagor from number 353
- Franco Donatelli, illustrated many stories from number 37 until 375
- Francesco Gamba, illustrates Zagor from number 140. Also, Gamba illustrated many numbers of Speciale Chico
- Mauro Laurenti, illustrates Zagor from number 334
- Carlo Raffaele Marcello, illustrates Zagor from number 345
- Michele Pepe, illustrated many stories from number 247 until 416
- Massimo Pesce, illustrates Zagor from number 384
- Pini Segna, illustrated Zagor from number 141 until 222
- Marco Torricelli, illustrates Zagor from number 253
- Marco Verni, illustrates Zagor from number 253
