= Giancarlo Berardi =

Italian writer

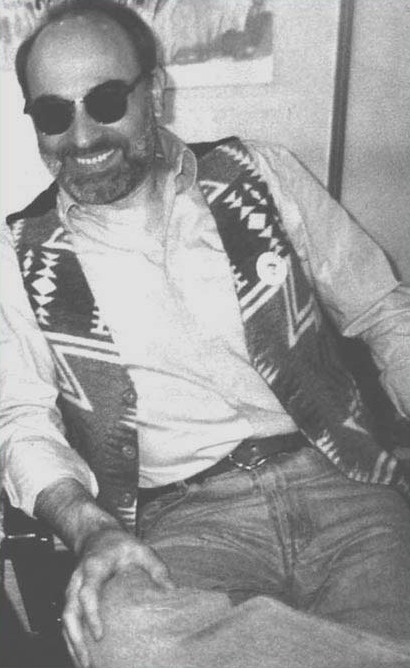
- Giancarlo Berardi in 1992, photo by Joezarrere.
- Born: November 15, 1949 (age 77) Genoa, Italy
- Area: Writer
- Notable works: Ken Parker; Julia
- Awards: U Giancu's Prize, 1997

Giancarlo Berardi (born 15 November 1949) is an Italian comic book writer. Born in Genoa, he is most famous as creator of comics Ken Parker (1977) and Julia (1998).

In 1977, he collaborated with artist Ivo Milazzo to create the Western series Ken Parker. The series is highly regarded for reinventing the traditional Western genre, bridging the gap between popular serial comics and highbrow auteur works by shifting the focus to more nuanced, psychologically grounded, and realistic storytelling. It achieved widespread critical and commercial acceptance in Italy and across international markets, including France and Spain.
