= Ivo Milazzo =

Italian comic book artist

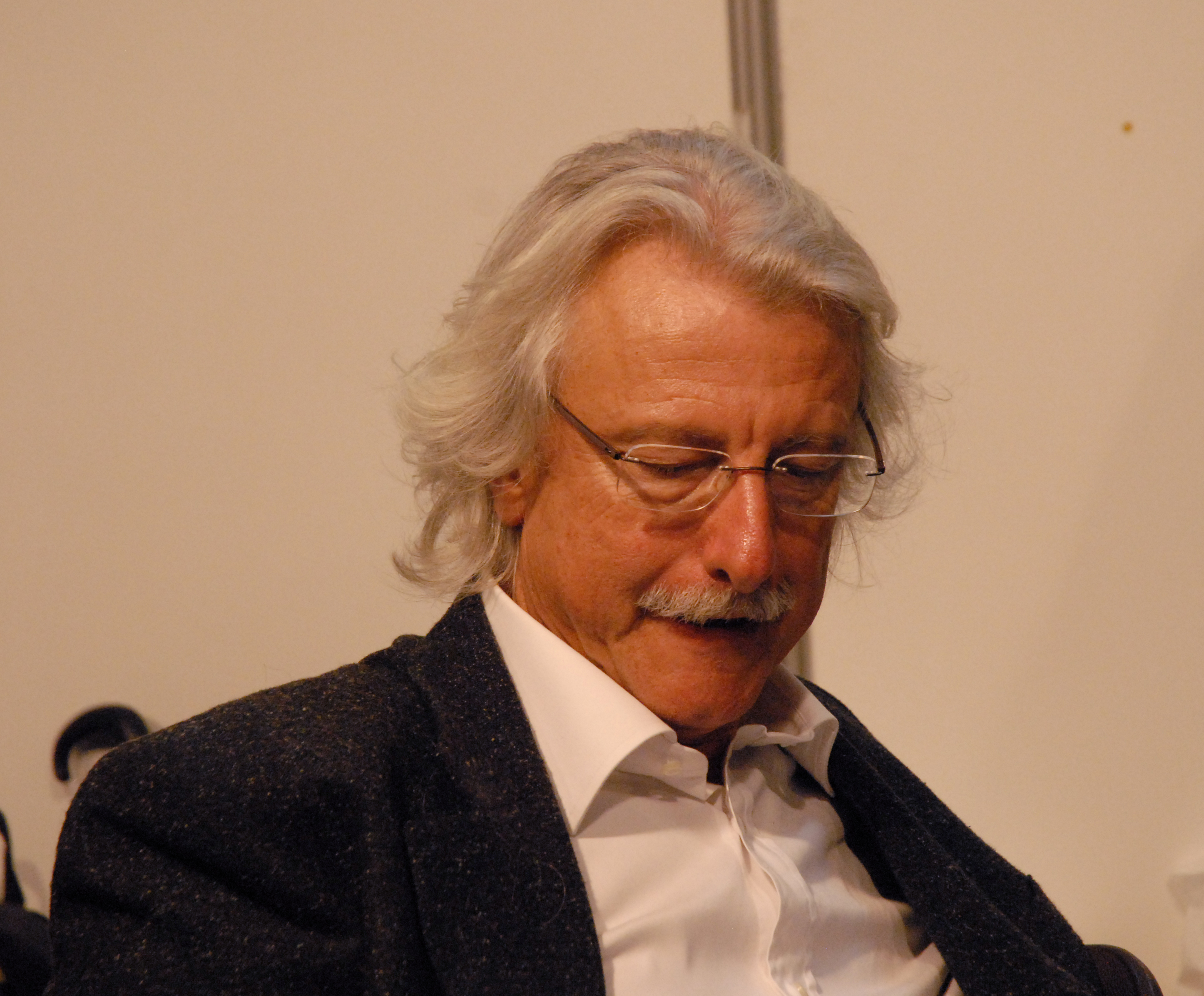
- Milazzo at Lucca Comics & Games 2010
- Born: June 20, 1947 (age 79) Tortona, Italy
- Area: Artist
- Notable works: Ken Parker
- Collaborators: Giancarlo Berardi
- Awards: U Giancu's Prize, 1999

Ivo Milazzo (born 20 June 1947) is an Italian comic book artist.

Born in Tortona, Milazzo worked mainly for Sergio Bonelli Editore. He debuted in 1971, drawing some Tarzan stories for the French market. Together with his friend, writer Giancarlo Berardi, he created a number of characters, including in 1974 Ken Parker, one of the most appreciated western characters of European comics.

His style is somewhat reminiscent of that of Hugo Pratt.
