= Julia (comics) =

Italian comic book series

Julia- le avventure di una criminologa
- No. of issues: 325 (ongoing)
- Page count: 128 pages
- Publisher: Sergio Bonelli Editore

Creative team
- Writers: Giancarlo Berardi; Lorenzo Calza; Maurizio Mantero
- Artist: Marco Soldi (cover artist, number 1-157); Cristiano Spadoni (cover artist, number 158-)
- Creator: Giancarlo Berardi

Original publication
- Date of publication: 1998
- Language: Italian

Julia - le avventure di una criminologa (Italian: Julia, adventures of a criminologist), known simply as Julia, is an Italian comic book series created by Giancarlo Berardi and edited by Sergio Bonelli Editore.

The protagonist, Julia Kendall, is a criminologist, and the stories are usually in the crime fiction genre.

== Creation ==
The comic series was created in 1998 by Berardi (already author of Ken Parker) and it was born of Sergio Bonelli Editore's wish for a purely detective series, as well as by request of Ken Parker's fans, after its end, for a new comic.

Berardi has attended criminology classes at Genoa's Istituto di Medicina Legale (Institute of Legal Medicine) to better prepare the new series. He also read various texts about psychology, sociology, psychiatry, criminology, ballistics, crime news articles, as well as crime novels, films and documentaries.

Julia Kendall's character is physically inspired by Audrey Hepburn, one of Berardi's favorite actresses. Choosing a female protagonist -an ordinary, easily relatable woman- had the series have a large following of woman readers, unusual for a crime fiction comic.

Issues of Julia have 128 pages instead of the usual 96 pages of Sergio Bonelli's comic series. Berardi has justified it saying that a bigger number of pages is better to develop the characters and manage the narrative's pace. The pages were later reduced to 116.

The first album in the series, titled Gli occhi del abisso ("The Eyes of the Abyss") was published in October 1998. On January 3, 2007, Julia reached the 100th issue with a fully colored album.

== Plot ==
The series tell the stories of Julia Kendall, a young criminologist from the fictional Garden City in New Jersey. She works as a professor at Hollyhock University and as a freelance consultant to the local police, helping them to solve crimes.

The cases Julia deals with put her in extremely dangerous situations, as her skills in psychology and her relations with Garden City Police Department lead her on the trail of vicious serial killers (above all the ruthless Myrna Harrod, a recurring character in the series) and unscrupulous criminals. Other cases involve her in classic whodunnit scenarios.

Alongside her in their investigations are the surly lieutenant Alan Webb and the friendly sergeant "Big" Ben Irving, as well as his friend and private investigator Leo Baxter.

Characteristic of the series is the extensive use of Julia's diary, where the protagonist writes her thoughts and impressions about the cases, working as a first-person narration. In some albums, the storytelling is done by other characters in the series (like Myrna Harrod or sergeant Irving).
