= Ken Parker (comics) =

Fictional character

Publication information
- Publication date: 1974 (in magazine), 1977 (in album form)

Ken Parker is a fictional character from a series of eponym Italian comics created in 1974 by Giancarlo Berardi and Ivo Milazzo. He is a widely appreciated character in Italy and all over former Yugoslavia. It was also published in Turkey under the title Alaska but failed to become as popular as Zagor though while it was in publication it was ranked above Tex.

First issue of the series, "Lungo fucile" ("long rifle") was published by the Italian publisher CEPIM. Ken Parker, however, had been created three years earlier on a magazine of the same publisher. The series ran for 59 numbers. New issues appeared in the following years, and are constantly under reprint in Italy.

Ken Parker is a western anti-hero, graphically inspired by Robert Redford of Jeremiah Johnson. Like Johnson, he is a trapper who had decided to escape from the first city to have appeared in the United States. His stories are mainly set in Northwestern states or, after Parker was forced to flee after his participation in some strikes in Boston (initially as a Pinkerton agent), along the Canadian frontier.

The themes dealt by the series are unusual for a western, including homosexuality, ecology, ghettoization, justice, the destiny of Man, and his relationship with God. Ken Parker is not a typical cowboy, a monolithic character like Tex Willer or John Wayne's heroes: he grows older since his first story (set in 1870) he commits errors and changes his ideas and ideals. He maintained: "I don't like to kill... not even when it is necessary".

Ken Parker regular publication ceased, but is still occasionally published by Sergio Bonelli Editore and Panini Comics.

== Sources ==
- Franco Fossati, I grandi eroi del fumetto, Gramese, 1990, pp. 131–132
- Domenico Denaro, La storia di Ken Parker, L'Arca Perduta, 1987
- Gianni Di Pietro, Ken Parker, il respiro del sogno, Del Grifo, 1989
