= List of Italian comics =

This is a list of Italian comics (fumetti).

== A ==
- Alan Ford by Max Bunker (author) and Magnus (artist)

== B ==
- La Bionda ("The Blonde") by Franco Saudelli

== C ==
- Calavera by Enrico Teodorani and Joe Vigil
- Il Gioco ("Click") by Milo Manara
- Cocco Bill by Benito Jacovitti
- Comandante Mark by Gianni Bono
- Corto Maltese by Hugo Pratt

== D ==
- Diabolik by Angela e Luciana Giussani
- Djustine by Enrico Teodorani
- Druuna by Serpieri
- Dylan Dog by Tiziano Sclavi

== F ==
- Fort Wheeling by Hugo Pratt
- Frigidaire, anthology

== G ==
- Geky Dor by Andrea Lavezzolo (writer) and Andrea Bresciani (artist)
- Gim Toro by Andrea Lavezzolo (writer) and Edgardo Dell'Acqua (artist)
- Giuseppe Bergman by Milo Manara
- Il Grande Blek by Editoriale Dardo

== I ==
- In Italia sono tutti maschi by Luca de Santis

== J ==
- Jesuit Joe by Hugo Pratt
- Julia by Giancarlo Berardi (writer)

== K ==
- Ken Parker by Giancarlo Berardi (writer) and Ivo Milazzo (artist)
- Kinowa by Andrea Lavezzolo (writer) and EsseGesse (artist)
- Klaus and Elmer by Massimo Perissinotto and Maurizio Ercole
- Kriminal by Max Bunker and Magnus

== L ==
- Lo Sconosciuto ("The Specialist") by Magnus

== M ==
- Magico Vento by Gianfranco Manfredi (writer)
- Martin Mystère by Alfredo Castelli (author) and Giancarlo Alessandrini (artist)
- Milady nel 3000 by Magnus
- Morgan by Hugo Pratt

== N ==
- Nathan Never by Michele Medda, Antonio Serra and Bepi Vigna (since 1991)

== P ==
- Il Piccolo Ranger by Andrea Lavezzolo (writer) and Francesco Gamba (artist)

== R ==
- RanXerox by Tanino Liberatore and Stefano Tamburini
- Rat-Man by Leo Ortolani

== S ==
- Satanik by Max Bunker and Magnus
- Sergeant Kirk by Hugo Pratt
- Sky Doll by Alessandro Barbucci and Barbara Canepa
- Sturmtruppen by Bonvi
- The Scorpions of the Desert (Gli scorpioni del deserto) by Hugo Pratt

== T ==
- Tex Willer by Gian Luigi Bonelli (author) and Aurelio Galleppini (artist)
- Tony Falco by Andrea Lavezzolo (writer) and Andrea Bresciani (artist)

== V ==
- Valentina by Guido Crepax

== W ==
- Wheela by Enrico Teodorani
- W.I.T.C.H. by Elisabetta Gnone
- Winx Club by Iginio Straffi

== Z ==
- Zagor by Sergio Bonelli
