= EsseGesse =

Italian team of cartoonists

EsseGesse was an Italian team of cartoonists, most famous for their Western comics, which were popular in the 1950s. The comics were translated to French, Serbo-Croatian, Turkish, Greek, Swedish, Danish and Norwegian.

Their name was taken from the Italian pronunciation of the first letters of their three surnames, Pietro Sartoris of Greek descent (Turin, 15 August 1926 - 27 July 1989), Dario Guzzon (Turin, 4 January 1926 – 3 May 2000), and Giovanni Sinchetto (Turin, 5 April 1922 - 19 January 1991). Some of their more famous series are Captain Miki, Il Grande Blek, Comandante Mark, Kinowa and Alan Mistero.

Kinowa by EsseGesse

In Turkey, three films were produced with the character Kinowa in the early 1970s.

== Early life ==
Dario Guzzon and Pietro Sartoris went to similar schools and obtained their diploma as primary school teachers. Guzzon attended the Art School and then the Academy of Fine Arts. Sartoris started up his publishing activity that eventually took him to the Taurina publishing house. He met Guzzon there. Guzzon himself was already publishing some of his cartoons in the magazine Piccina. When Taurina went bankrupt, the two men had already become close friends and passed to another publishing house, Edizioni Alpe, owned by Giuseppe Caregaro, where Guzzon designed some episodes of the strip "Cucciolo", while Sartoris edited the collection Tarman with a script by Amedeo Martini. Later on, at Torelli, they met the person who would become their soul mate in so many future cartoon adventures: Giovanni Sinchetto. Sinchetto made his début in the world of cartoons with the series entitled "Fulmine Mascherato" and then continued with "Carnera" published by Torelli. The first co-operation between the three young authors from Turin gave life to "Kinowa" in 1950, a cartoon built on texts by Andrea Lavezzolo and published by the Dardo press owned by Gino Casarotti.

== Captain Miki ==
The first character to be drawn and dramatized by the three authors, who by that time had started to sign themselves with the acronym EsseGesse, was published on 1 July 1951: the famous Capitan Miki (Captain Miki). The protagonist of the story is a sixteen-year-old boy alone in the world, who becomes a friend of a funny drunkard called Double Rum and joins up with the Nevada Rangers. After carrying out a number of successful missions where he shows all his bravery and firmness, young Miki is promoted, in spite of his young age, to the rank of captain. Captain Miki also has his own young fiancée, Susy, the daughter of the fort commandant, and in addition to Double Rum - based on the classic old man of westerns (interpreted by Walter Brennan in many film versions) - he makes friends with another funny character, Doctor Salasso, graphically reminiscent of the actor Thomas Mitchell (drunken Doc, the alcoholic, in "Stagecoach?"). These two characters gave the cartoon series a vein of comic relief, to counterbalance Miki's almost excessive maturity and conscientiousness.

Captain Miki by EsseGesse.

In 1953 EsseGesse had the first contacts with Tea Bonelli, the then wise guide of our Publishing House, and produced the art work for the "Cavaliere nero" dramatized from texts by Giovanni Luigi Bonelli. It was an album that recounted the adventures of Frisco Smith, a policeman serving for a western railway company. Dressed in a vaguely Mexican style, the hero of this serial is a skilful gunslinger usually assisted by a young Native American called Piccolo Corvo.

== Il Grande Blek ==
"Il Grande Blek" was published on 3 October 1954 by Casarotti: the story is set during the American Revolution and Blek is the leader of a group of trappers who fight against the cruel Redcoats, the symbol of colonialist oppression. Blek's faithful buddies in adventure are his stepson Roddy and the ingenious professor Occultis. It was published during 650 parts until 1967 before a dispute sets the authors to the publisher. It is Lug who would publish the whole adventures of Blek in France. First in black and white in Kiwi, then in its own name magazine, republishing its adventures in colors. Numerous covers were realized by Jean Frisano. When the original stories were exhausted, new ones were created by Carlo Cedroni or Nicola del Principe, but also in France by Jean-Yves Mitton, André Amouriq or Ciro Tota.

Miki and Blek were both achieved enormous success and were created up until 1965, and would later be continued abroad with artwork by French illustrators.

Il Grande Blek by EsseGesse.

== Alan Mistero ==
In 1965 there appeared "Alan Mistero", whose protagonist was a sturdy fiery red-haired hero capable of the most astonishing disguises and also a very skilful gunman, flanked in his adventures by two comic foils: the sophisticated Conte and the greedy Polpetta. This series originally appeared in a collection of weekly albums published by its own creators, but failed to achieve success and the series was soon after transferred by the three Torino authors to the publishing house Araldo, owned by Sergio Bonelli, which published it in the appendix of the Collana Araldo.

== Comandante Mark ==
In September 1966, Comandante Mark was finally born. Once the regular January 1990 series was finished, the reprinting of the whole series Tutto Mark was published the very next month, and starting from the summer of that same year the Specials were also published, reaching their thirteenth annual publication by the summer of 2000.

Commander Mark by EsseGesse.

Against the background of the American Revolutionary War, Comandante Mark is presented to readers as a physically strong and confident young man, notable for lacking the aloofness or sense of superiority sometimes associated with protagonists of the genre. Mark is depicted as having gained extensive experience through repeated hard-fought engagements against the forces of George III, which he draws on to succeed. He is accompanied by the Ontario Wolves, a group of guerrilla fighters drawn from many different places, of all ages and social classes, united by a shared cause despite their differing personal histories.

After Sartoris and Sinchetto passed on in 1989 and 1991 respectively, Guzzon was the only one left capable of designing and supervising the stories of Mark and his Ontario Wolves in Special Albums; so the baton was completely handed over to the illustrator Lina Buffolente, another doyen of Italian cartoons, mainly known for her contribution to the "Piccolo Ranger" saga. The scripts were instead developed over the following years by Bonelli's new generation of authors, such Moreno Burattini and Luigi Mignacco and Michele Masiero. The passing away of Guzzon in May 2000 finally marked the end of EsseGesse.

== Sources ==
- "Big Blek". Deadlicious. May 26, 2007. Archived from the original on Dec 20, 2011.
- "The Creators of Marks". Sergio Bonelli Editore. Archived from the original on Jul 24, 2009.
- "Zagor". Fantasy-world. Archived from the original on Sep 29, 2018.
