= Lists of comics =

Comics are a medium used to express ideas with images, often combined with text or other visual information. It typically takes the form of a sequence of panels of images. Textual devices such as speech balloons, captions, and onomatopoeia can indicate dialogue, narration, sound effects, or other information.

== General ==
- List of comic books
- List of comic strips
- Lists of webcomics
- List of comic books on CD/DVD
- List of comics and comic strips made into feature films
- List of comics solicited but never published
- List of feminist comic books
- List of limited series
- List of comics awards
- List of best-selling comic series
- List of wrestling-based comic books

== By country ==
- List of American comics
- List of Franco-Belgian comics series
- List of Indian comics
- List of Italian comics
- Lists of manga
- Lianhuanhua listed by year
- List of manhua
- List of manhwa licensed in English
- List of Philippine comics
- List of Spanish comics

== By genre ==
- List of dystopian comics
- List of fantasy comics
- List of furry comics
- List of romance comics

== By work ==
- List of comics based on fiction
- List of comics based on films
- List of comics based on television programs
- List of comics based on video games
- List of comics based on unproduced film projects
- List of Star Wars comic books

== See also ==
- Lists of books
- Lists of films
- Lists of television programs
- Category:Lists of comics
