= Sciuscià (comics) =

Italian comic book series

Publication information
- Genre: Action/adventure
- Publication date: 1949-1966

Sciuscià is an Italian comic book series created by publisher and writer Tristano Torelli in tandem with illustrator Ferdinando Tacconi and also later developed by Gianna Arguissola and Renzo Barbieri as writers and Franco Paludetti and Gianluigi Coppola as artists. It originally run from 1949 until 1956.

== History and profile ==
The comics were inspired by the Vittorio De Sica's neorealist drama film Shoeshine, and the series itself has been described as a "neorealist comic". Set in Italy between the end of World War II and contemporary days, each issue was a self-contained episode and recounted the adventures of the young shoeshine Nico and of his friends. It debuted on January 22, 1949, and got an immediate success.

Initially filled with realistic elements, the stories gradually lost originality and believability, with the group of teenagers sent to missions in Africa, China or Canada, and both the quality and the commercial success of the series started to decline. Starting from September 1953, the issues were released without titles. Sciuscià officially ceased its publications in April 1955, while the series continued to be published in Il Piccolo Sceriffo until 1956.

The series was briefly resurrected in 1965 in the comic magazine Commandos, with new stories still written by Torelli and illustrated by Lina Buffolente. The comic book series also inspired a novel, Sciuscià (1952), written by Tristano Tirelli and Gianna Arguissola.

During the years the comic book series was republished several times.

== See also ==
Other comics series created by Tristano Torelli:

- Carnera (1947–1950)
- Il Piccolo Sceriffo (1948–1966)
