= Il Piccolo Ranger =

Italian comic book series

Cover of Il Piccolo Ranger, September 1976.

Il Piccolo Ranger (i.e. "The Little Ranger") is an Italian comic book series centered on Kit Teller, a character created in 1958 by writer Andrea Lavezzolo in tandem with illustrator Francesco Gamba and later developed by numerous authors; they were published in Italy by Edizioni Audace in the striped format in the series of the same name and later in a new series in the Bonelli format published from 1963 to 1985. The character belongs to a group of teenage heroes very popular in the fifties and sixties, such as Captain Miki, the Little Sheriff and others. These characters were young to facilitate their identification with potential young buyers, that being their peers, who could reflect themselves in the protagonists of comic stories. The series presents its own originality, giving life to a long and engaging comic epic with both tragic and humorous tones among the most successful of the western genre of the period. The series was also published in France, the former Yugoslavia (now in Slovenia, Croatia, Bosnia and Herzegovina and Serbia), Turkey, Greece, Spain, and Brazil.

A traditional western series addressed to a young audience, it debuted in 1958 and was published until 1985. Until 1963, Il Piccolo Ranger comic books also featured other characters in their appendix episodic stories, including works by Hugo Pratt, Guido Nolitta and Dino Battaglia. It was released fortnightly until 1971, then monthly until its cancellation. Between 1995 and 1996, a 13-volume paperback collection was published in a limited edition by Editrice Dardo.

== Biography ==
Kit Teller is the son of Mary Worth and Ted Moses Teller who emigrate from Wales to the United States in search of fortune. Once they arrive, they venture into the wild frontier territories in search of a job. During this trip, Kit was born in 1861 on the border of Missouri and Illinois. Eight months after Kit's birth, his mother died and little Kit fell ill. Saved by the Indians of the Red Bison tribe, Kit and his father stay with the Indians for almost a year and then leave to join the rangers and send Kit to a college in the east. Moses becomes a ranger and obtains permission from the commander to keep the little Kit at the fort until the child reaches reach college age. The Little Ranger series starts here. Kit's father deserts during a mission to go live with the Indians. For this reason he is considered a traitor. The fort's rangers intend to keep the fact from little Kit, who is well-liked anyway. The Little Ranger adventures in a wild land and faces outlaws, ferocious Indians, wise reptiles, extraterrestrials, and medieval warriors with know-how in the New World. Among the characters he meets, perhaps the most unusual are two Mormon, Italian-American vegetarians: SATURNINO and SALVATORE. They are experts of every art and science, endowed with strange powers. Among other things, they talk to animals, in a way not unlike what happens in the pages of the Tarzanesque Akim. They warn the two Tellers, father and son, to beware of the water on full moon nights. Such a warning will save them from several ambushes. At the end of each adventure, the young ranger finds his friends within the reassuring walls of the ranger fort. Among them the fiancée Claretta Morning, the maternal vivander of the strong Rosa Morning, mother of Claretta, the drunkard Brandy Jim, the Chinese cook and washerman Cin Lao, the sergeant O'Hara, Teeth Bill, Frankie Bellevan, Annie Four guns, and Ibrahim Bamboula.

== Editorial history ==
The character made his debut in the Collana Audace of the homonymous publishing house by Gian Luigi Bonelli in the classic striped format published in seven series from 15 June 1958 to 25 April 1971, for a total of 328 issues. The screenplays are by Andrea Lavezzolo and, to a lesser extent, by Guido Nolitta while the drawings are by Francesco Gamba and Birago Balzano. Subsequently, with the books not sold, the publisher re-proposed the Little Ranger series in a total of 69 collections, starting from no. 11 of the series Supplement to the Audace series. The collections do not have a periodicity and the price is 100 lire for the first volumes and 120 for the remaining issues. From 1963 the stories proposed in the strip format in the Audace series were reprinted in the Bonelli format in the series Gli albi del cowboy – Nuova serie up to page 55 of no. 89 when unpublished stories of the character began to be published. The publication ended in February 1985 after 255 issues. In the final publication, Kit, Frankie, and their friends finish their years with the Rangers uniform, retire to the countryside, and begin a new life as ranchers. The merit of the longevity of the series, however, must also be attributed to those who continued the work of Andrea Lavezzolo. Decio Canzio, while maintaining the spirit of the series, made the narrative more agile, updating it to the changing times. Giorgio Pezzin, Marcello Toninelli, and the If Staff also worked on the series. Note that Guido Nolitta wrote the last adventure of the series.

An unpublished, self-contained episode entitled "Secret document" was published as an appendix to no. 99 of Commander Mark in the Herald Series. In May 1992, a 148-page special issue was published entitled "The return of the Rangers," written by Mauro Boselli and drawn by Francesco Gamba. Finally, in 2006, the Editoriale Mercury published a new unpublished story entitled "Zoltan the Magician," written by Ermes Senzò and drawn by Luigi Merati. In February 2012, the Little Ranger was reprinted in an edition for newsstands by If Edizioni.

List of albums of the series "The books of the cowboy – New series"

Number	Original title	Title	Publication date
1	Il Piccolo Ranger	The Little Ranger	December 1963
2	L'indiano bianco	White Indian	January 1964
3	Il segno di Manitù	The Sing of Manitou	February 1964
4	L'uomo di ferro	Iron man	March 1964
5	Il padrone della folgore	The Master of Lightning	April 1964
6	Mani in alto!	Hands Up!	May 1964
7	Sepolto vivo!	Buried Alive!	June 1964
8	La casa del mistero	The House of Mystery	July 1964
9	Il morso del serpente	The Snake Bite	August 1964
10	Nuove reclute	New Recruits	September 1964
11	La bussola stregata	The Bewitched Compass	October 1964
12	Kit contro tutti!	Kit Against All	November 1964
13	Il totem d'avorio	The Ivory Totem	December 1964
14	Il pugnale malese	The Malay Dagger	January 1965
15	Il tranello	The Trap	February 1965
16	L'inferno verde	The Green Hell	March 1965
17	La stella del Nord	The North Star	April 1965
18	Formiche rosse	Red Ants	May 1965
19	La maschera di cera	The Wax Mask	June 1965
20	Le colline proibite	The Forbidden Hills	July 1965
21	Azione notturna	Night Action	August 1965
22	Rangers all'attacco	Rangers Attack	September 1965
23	Il Cavaliere Nero	The Black Knight	October 1965
24	Il terzo complice	The Third Accomplice	November 1965
25	Missione compiuta	Mission Accomplished	December 1965
26	Battaglia nel canyon	Battle in the Canyon	January 1966
27	Allarme al forte	Alarm at the Fort	February 1966
28	Fulmine Nero	Black Lightning	March 1966
29	Killer Jim	Killer Jim	April 1966
30	L'Orda Rossa	The Red Horde	May 1966
31	Spari nella notte	Shoots in the Night	June 1966
32	Colui che viene da Nord	He Who Comes From the North	July 1966
33	I negrieri dei Caraibi	The Caribbean Slavers	August 1966
34	La cascata della morte	The Waterfall of Death	September 1966
35	La voce nelle tenebre	The Voice in the Darkness	October 1966
36	Orme sul sentiero	Footprints on the Trail	November 1966
37	Segnali di fumo	Smoke Signals	December 1966
38	Bottino di guerra	Spoils of War	January 1967
39	L'invincibile	The Invincible	February 1967
40	La collana di smeraldi	The Emerald Necklace	March 1967
41	Il fantasma	The Ghost	April 1967
42	Un eroe ritorna	A Hero Returns	May 1967
43	Il sospetto!	The Suspect!	June 1967
44	Gli avventurieri	The Adventurers	July 1967
45	La lunga pista	The Long Trek	August 1967
46	La ribellione	The Rebellion	September 1967
47	Frontier Town	Frontier Town	October 1967
48	Nel campo nemico	In the Enemy Camp	November 1967
49	La Banda dei Cinque	The Gang of Five	December 1967
50	Veleno!	Venom!	January 1968
51	Rangers in agguato	Rangers Lurking	February 1968
52	Caccia all'uomo	Manhunt	March 1968
53	Malatierra	Malatierra	April 1968
54	Bandiera bianca	White flag	May 1968
55	La valle maledetta	The Cursed Valley	June 1968
56	Old Nick	Old Nick	July 1968
57	La legge di Lynch	Lynch's Law	August 1968
58	La caverna dell'oro	'The Cave of Gold	September 1968
59	Il cavallo d'acciaio	The Steel Horse	October 1968
60	Guerra indiana	Indian War	November 1968
61	Tragica fine	Tragic End	December 1968
62	L'albero della morte	The Tree of Death	January 1969
63	Il tesoro	The Treasure	February 1969
64	La valle nascosta	The Hidden Valley	March 1969
65	Sulla via di Austin	On the Way to Austin	April 1969
66	Ombra Rossa	Red Shadow	May 1969
67	L'assedio!	The Siege	June 1969
68	L'ultima beffa	The ultimate Bluff	July 1969
69	Senza tregua!	Without Respite	August 1969
70	Avventura in Messico	Adventure in Mexico	September 1969
71	Bande rivali	Rival Gangs	October 1969
72	Assalto a Valle Nera	Assault on Black Valley	November 1969
73	Il trionfo di Kit	Kit's triumph	December 1969
74	Verso l'Irlanda	Towards Ireland	January 1970
75	Lo spettro dello stagno	The Spectrum of the Pond	February 1970
76	Il castello maledetto	The Cursed Castle	March 1970
77	I naufragatori	The Shipwreckers	April 1970
78	L'isola in fiamme	The Island on Fire	May 1970
79	La gloriosa impresa	The Glorious Feat	June 1970
80	Terra bruciata!	Scorched earth!	July 1970
81	Oro!	Gold!	August 1970
82	"El Charro"	"El Charo	September 1970
83	La fine di un bandito	The End of a Bandit	October 1970
84	Il deserto non-perdona	The Desert Does Not Forgive	November 1970
85	Storia di un ribelle	Story of a Rebel	December 1970
86	La legione dei dannati	The Legion of the Damned	January 1971
87	Silver Lake	Silver Lake	February 1971
88	La regina delle tenebre	The Queen of Darkness	March 1971
89	La pietra della vita	The Stone of Life	April 1971
90	Quartiere cinese	Chinatown	May 1971
91	Le tigri del mare	'The Sea Tigers	June 1971
92	L'immortale	The Immortal	July 1971
93	Il diabolico barone	The Diabolic Baron	August 1971
94	Il libro rosso	The Red Book	September 1971
95	La parola di un ranger	The Word of a Ranger	October 1971
96	La banda degli evasi	The Gang of Escapees	November 1971
97	Luna di sangue	Blood Moon	December 1971
98	Il ragazzo selvaggio	The Wild Boy	January 1972
99	Bisonte Nero	Black Bison	February 1972
100	Lost Valley (a colori)	Lost Valley (in color)	March 1972
101	Kit è scomparso	Kit Has Disappeared	April 1972
102	Il Grande Vecchio	The Great Old Man	May 1972
103	Nel cuore della giungla	In the Heart of the Jungle	June 1972
104	La città morta	The Dead City	July 1972
105	Oltre il confine	Beyond the Border	August 1972
106	L'arma del delitto	The Murder Weapon	September 1972
107	Campesinos!	Campesinos!	October 1972
108	La casa sulla collina	The House on the Hill	November 1972
109	Uomini violenti	Violent Men	December 1972
110	La tenda gialla	The Yellow Curtain	January 1973
111	L'artiglio del mostro	The Monster's Claw	February 1973
112	Il solitario del Pecos	The Solitaire of Pecos	March 1973
113	Gli sbandati	The Stragglers	April 1973
114	L'oro del Sud	The Gold of the South	May 1973
115	"Agua Blanca"	"Agua Blanca"	June 1973
116	Un ranger a New York	A Ranger in New York	July 1973
117	Il Fantasma dell'Opera	'The Phantom of the Opera	August 1973
118	Gli angeli giustizieri	The Angels of Justice	September 1973
119	La città nella palude	The City in the Swamp	October 1973
120	Texas in fiamme	Texas on fire	November 1973
121	Il complotto	The Conspiracy	December 1973
122	La banda inafferrabile	The Elusive Gang	January 1974
123	Il vulcano spento	The Extinct Volcano	February 1974
124	L'iceberg della morte	The Iceberg of Death	March 1974
125	Nodo scorsoio!	Slipknot!	April 1974
126	Le mille e una trappola	The Thousand and one Trap	May 1974
127	Il professionista	The Professionist	June 1974
128	La roccia nel deserto	The Rock in the Desert	July 1974
129	Raffica mortale	Deadly Barrage	August 1974
130	Il fiume nascosto	The Hidden River	September 1974
131	Ku Klux Klan!	Ku Klux Klan	October 1974
132	La maschera del terrore	The Mask of Terror	November 1974
133	La belva umana	The Human Beast	December 1974
134	A mosca cieca!	A Blind Fly!	January 1975
135	Il terzo giustiziere	The Third Executioner	February 1975
136	Il monaco	The Monk	March 1975
137	Riserva Apache	Apache Reserve	April 1975
138	L'Olandese Volante	The Flying Dutchman	May 1975
139	La galleria della morte	The Gallery of Death	June 1975
140	Destinazione Tucson	Destination Tucson	July 1975
141	La legione degli invulnerabili	The Legion of the Invulnerables	August 1975
142	L'incredibile duello	The Incredible Duel	September 1975
143	La montagna incantata	The Enchanted Mountain	October 1975
144	La crociera dell'"Hispaniola"	The Cruise of the "Hispaniola"	November 1975
145	L'Isola dei Delfini	The Island of the Dolphins	December 1975
146	Duello sull'oceano	Duel on the Ocean	January 1976
147	La perla dell'Oklahoma	The Pearl of Oklahoma	February 1976
148	Sfida infernale	Infernal Challenge	March 1976
149	La febbre dell'oro	The Gold Rush	April 1976
150	La rupe della paura	The Cliff of Fear	May 1976
151	Il mostro del plenilunio	The Monster of the Full Moon	June 1976
152	La barriera invisibile	The Invisible Barrier	July 1976
153	Viaggio nella preistoria	Journey into Prehistory	August 1976
154	I rettili sapienti	The Wise Reptiles	September 1976
155	Mesa del Norte	Mesa del Norte	October 1976
156	Tiro al bersaglio	Target Shooting	November 1976
157	Il Dragone Nero	The Black Dragon	December 1976
158	Il volto dell'assassino	The Face of the Assassin	January 1977
159	L'ultimo agguato	The Last Ambush	February 1977
160	Il vendicatore	The Avenger	March 1977
161	Attacco al vagone postale	Attack on the Mail Car	April 1977
162	Il segreto dell'idolo	The Secret of the Idol	May 1977
163	Binario morto	Dead End Track	June 1977
164	Sfida nella città fantasma	Challenge in the Ghost Town	July 1977
165	I Cavalieri della Notte	The Knights of the Night	August 1977
166	La tana del diavolo	The Devil's Lair	September 1977
167	La Vedova Nera	The Black Widow	October 1977
168	Infamia!	Infamy!	November 1977
169	L'ultimo atto	The Last Act	December 1977
170	Winchester	Winchester	January 1978
171	Il ragno e la mosca	The Spider and the Fly	February 1978
172	Il mercante di Laredo	The Laredo Merchant	March 1978
173	Rintocchi di morte	Chimes of death	April 1978
174	La spia messicana	The Mexican Spy	May 1978
175	La sesta vittima	The Sixth Victim	June 1978
176	Traguardo all'inferno	Finish Line in Hell	July 1978
177	L'imboscata	The Ambush	August 1978
178	La maschera dell'odio	The Mask of Hatred	September 1978
179	La congiura dei potenti	The Conspiracy of the Powerful	October 1978
180	Un branco di lupi	A Wolfpack	November 1978
181	Il guerriero di ghiaccio	The Ice Warrior	December 1978
182	La nave vichinga	The Viking Ship	January 1979
183	Gli uomini condor	The Condor Men	February 1979
184	La miniera maledetta	The Cursed Mine	March 1979
185	L'assassino è tra noi	The Assassin is among us	April 1979
186	I Tre Serpenti	The Three Serpents	May 1979
187	I prigionieri del pueblo	The Prisoners of the Pueblo	June 1979
188	La tempesta di fuoco	The Firestorm	July 1979
189	Operazione Terrore	Operation Terror	August 1979
190	Gli artigli del falco	The Talons of the Hawk	September 1979
191	Lo Spirito dei Boschi	The Spirit of the Woods	October 1979
192	Sentiero di guerra	War Trail	November 1979
193	Luna di morte	Death Moon	December 1979
194	Il Signore delle Stelle	The Lord of the Stars	January 1980
195	L'uomo che non-poteva morire	The Man Who Couldn't Die	February 1980
196	La vendetta del faraone	Pharaoh's Vengeance	March 1980
197	Delitto perfetto	Perfect Crime	April 1980
198	La peste africana	The African Plague	May 1980
199	Lampi sul Messico	Lightning on Mexico	June 1980
200	Alto tradimento	High Treason	July 1980
201	La febbre della palude	Swamp Fever	August 1980
202	Khubai Khan!	Khubai Khan!	September 1980
203	La fuga	The Escape	October 1980
204	La pista dei Sioux	The Trek of the Sioux	November 1980
205	La Valle dei Teschi	The Valley of the Skulls	December 1980
206	Il mistero del tempio	The Mystery of the Temple	January 1981
207	Tragica magia	Tragic Magic	February 1981
208	Il mantello nero	The Black Cloak	March 1981
209	Markus!	Markus!	April 1981
210	Per un milione di dollari	For a Million Dollars	May 1981
211	Il messaggio	The Message	June 1981
212	Un uomo da salvare	A Man To Be Saved	July 1981
213	L'oro di Goldstone	Goldstone's Gold	August 1981
214	Orrore dall'ignoto	Horror From the Unknown	September 1981
215	Viaggio allucinante	Hallucinating Journey	October 1981
216	Lo Sparviero	The Sparrowhawk	November 1981
217	Il coltello sacro	The Sacred Knife	December 1981
218	Ai confini del Texas	On the Border of Texas	January 1982
219	L'accampamento segreto	The Secret Camp	February 1982
220	Lo stregone rosso	The Red Sorcerer	March 1982
221	Il genio del male	The Evil Genius	April 1982
222	Agguato nella prateria	Ambush in the Prairie	May 1982
223	Il pirata Barbanera	The Pirate Blackbeard	June 1982
224	I naufragatori dei Caraibi	The Shipwreckers of the Caribbean	July 1982
225	L'uomo dai due volti	The Man With Two Faces	August 1982
226	Tre giorni per morire	Three Days To Die	September 1982
227	Malinke!	Malinke!	October 1982
228	I diavoli delle montagne	The Devils of the Mountains	November 1982
229	La furia dei Wudog	The Fury of the Wudogs	December 1982
230	Il terrore di Black Valley	The Terror of Black Valley	January 1983
231	Allarme al castello	Alarm at the Castle	February 1983
232	Il villaggio dell'incubo	The Nightmare Village	March 1983
233	L'ombra inafferrabile	The Elusive Shadow	April 1983
234	I pascoli dell'odio	The Pastures of Hate	May 1983
235	La trama del delitto	The Plot of the Crime	June 1983
236	L'impero dei Mendoza	The Empire of the Mendoza	July 1983
237	Il risveglio del dinosauro	The Awakening of the Dinosaur	August 1983
238	Il ribelle	The Rebel	September 1983
239	Assedio al Picco Solitario	Siege of Lonely Peak	October 1983
240	Jack lo sterminatore	Jack the Exterminator	November 1983
241	Duello sul treno	Duel on the Train	December 1983
242	I morti viventi	The Living Dead	January 1984
243	Danza macabra	Macabre Dance	February 1984
244	Herr Doctor	Herr Doctor	March 1984
245	Il sosia	Twin	April 1984
246	Le grotte della paura	The Caves of Fear	May 1984
247	Tentato omicidio	Attempted Murder	June 1984
248	Uno sporco intrigo	A Dirty Intrigue	July 1984
249	Sangue sulla neve	Blood on the Snow	August 1984
250	Senza pietà	Without pity!	September 1984
251	Il re della frontiera	The King of the Frontier	October 1984
252	Il forte del disonore	The fort of dishonor	November 1984
253	Lotta di spie	Fight of Spies	December 1984
254	L'ultima avventura	The latest adventure	January 1985
255	Rangers, addio!	Rangers, goodbye!	February 1985

== See also ==
Other comics series created by Andrea Lavezzolo:

- Gim Toro (1946–1951)
- Tony Falco (1948–1949)
- Geky Dor (1949–1950)
- Kinowa (1950–1961)
