= Francesco Gamba =

Italian painter (1818–1887)

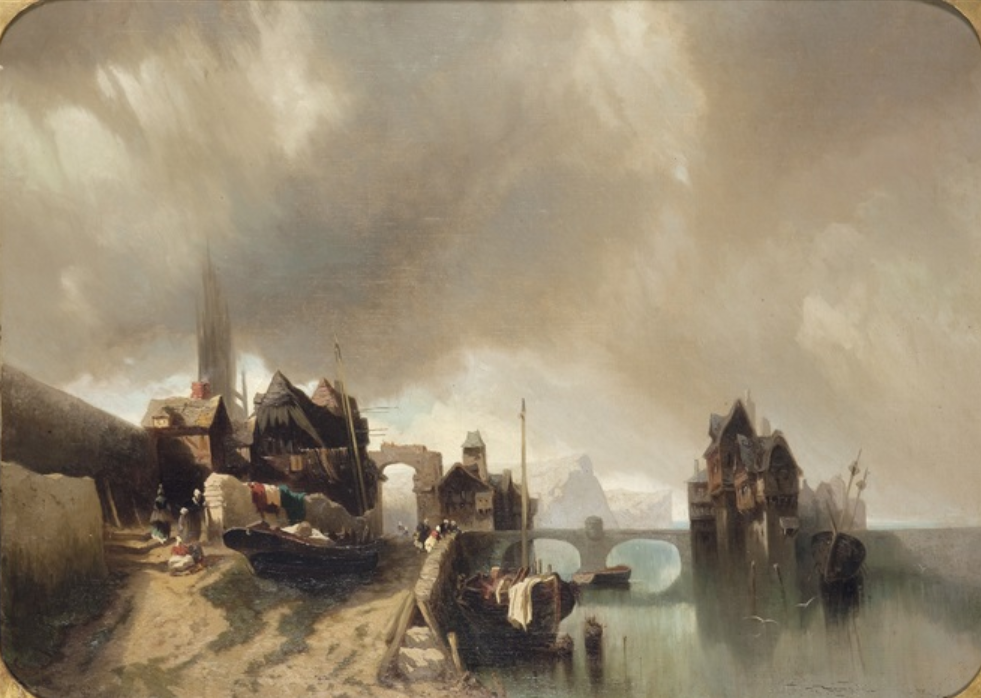
Cliffs in a Dutch Village

Francesco Gamba (December 21, 1818 – May 10, 1887) was an Italian painter, mainly of seascapes.

== Biography ==
He was born in Turin to Alberto, a main auditor for the Court of King Charles Albert of Sardinia. His father was named Baron in 1835. His mother was Marta Borgnis di Mannheim. Francesco's brother Enrico Gamba was also a painter; his brother Alberto, a doctor. Both became prominent academics in Turin. Francesco initially studied law, but soon quit his college studies to sail for months around the Mediterranean and Europe. He returned to Turin to enroll in the Accademia Albertina, and in 1842, he participated in the Promotrice exhibition in Turin.

At the exhibition of 1846, he submitted a dozen landscape paintings, reflecting his many trips. He continued to travel and paint throughout Europe, including France, Germany, Netherlands, Britain and Norway. Between 1845 and 1855 met the landscape artists of the Schools of Fontainebleau and the Düsseldorf, and was influenced by the seascape painters Andreas Achenbach and Hermann Mevius. He preferred to paint outside in the open air, much like the Macchiaioli painters. He was a friend of Ferdinando Arborio Gattinara di Breme. He participated in the reform of the Albertina in 1855. Among other works are The old channel of Annecy (1847), Ostend Beach (1852), Low tide along the dunes of Scheveningen (1855), and Storm coast of Normandy (1856). His Veduta di Moncalieri (1853) is housed in the royal Castello of Agliè.

He became director of the Royal Pinacoteca at the end of 1869. He wrote about the work of the painter Defendente Ferrari. Among his pupils were Angelo Beccaria, Carlo Piacenza, and Giuseppe Camino.
