= Carnera (comics) =

Italian comic book series

Publication information
- Genre: Action/adventure
- Publication date: 1947-1950
- No. of issues: 97

Carnera is an Italian comic book series created by publisher and writer Tristano Torelli and graphically rendered by illustrator Mario Uggeri. It originally run from 1947 until 1950.

== History and profile ==
The comics were inspired by the figure of Italian boxer Primo Carnera, who had already graphically inspired another comic character, Dick Fulmine. Set in the contemporary United States, each issue was a self-contained episode and recounted the imaginary life of the boxer, between sport successes and battles against the organized crime.

The comic book series debuted on April 15, 1947 and was published until March 25, 1950. Franco Paludetti, Camillo Zuffi, Nino Puglisi, Nini Segna, Piero Sartori, Dario Guzzon and Giovanni Sinchetto alternated as illustrators. Other series were presented in the appendix of each issue, including Mario Uggeri's Ravengart and Paolo Piffarerio's Carlin.

Starting from 1953 the series was translated into German.

== See also ==
Other comics series created by Tristano Torelli:

- Il Piccolo Sceriffo (1948–1966)
- Sciuscià (1949–1956)
