= Shoeshine (film) =

- Film poster
- Directed by: Vittorio De Sica
- Written by: Sergio Amidei; Adolfo Franci; Cesare Giulio Viola; Cesare Zavattini
- Produced by: Giuseppe Amato; Paolo William Tamburella
- Starring: Franco Interlenghi; Rinaldo Smordoni; Annielo Mele; Bruno Ortenzi; Emilio Cigoli
- Cinematography: Anchise Brizzi
- Edited by: Niccolò Lazzari
- Music by: Alessandro Cicognini
- Distributed by: ENIC
- Release date: 27 April 1946
- Running time: 93 minutes
- Country: Italy
- Language: Italian/English
- Box office: $34,677

Shoeshine (Italian: Sciuscià [ʃuʃˈʃa], from Neapolitan pronunciation of the English) is a 1946 Italian film directed by Vittorio De Sica. Sometimes regarded as his first masterpiece, the film follows two shoeshine boys who get into trouble with the police after trying to find the money to buy a horse. In 2008, Shoeshine was included on the Italian Ministry of Cultural Heritage’s 100 Italian films to be saved, a list of 100 films that "have changed the collective memory of the country between 1942 and 1978."

Shoeshine became the first film to win the Academy Award for Best International Feature Film at the 20th Academy Awards in 1947.

Film critic Pauline Kael summed up the power of the film by saying "if people cannot feel Shoeshine, what can they feel?" and equated it to music by Mozart had he written an opera set in poverty.

== Plot ==
Two friends, Giuseppe Filippucci and Pasquale Maggi, test-ride horses. They are saving to purchase a horse, although they are only living off their income from shining shoes in the streets of Rome.

One day Giuseppe's older brother, Attilio, visits the boys and tells them that Panza (a fence) has some work for them. Pasquale brings Giuseppe along to meet Panza, who gives them two blankets to sell. Giuseppe and Pasquale take the blankets to a fortune teller, who buys them. After the sale, Panza, Attilio, and another man burst into the fortune teller's house, posing as policemen. They accuse the fortune teller of handling stolen goods, and finding Giuseppe and Pasquale, force them out and pretend to take them into custody. Attilio tells the boys to go away and keep quiet, letting them keep the blanket money (2,800 lira) as well as 3,000 additional lira. With this money, the boys have enough to finally buy a horse.

After purchasing their horse and riding it, the boys return to the city. There the real police, accompanied by the fortune teller, bring them into the precinct for questioning. The police accuse the boys of stealing 700,000 lira from the fortune teller's home, which obviously was stolen by Panza and Attilio, posing as the policemen. The boys deny all charges and do not mention their knowledge of the three true con men. Giuseppe and Pasquale are sent to a juvenile detention center. On arrival, Giuseppe and Pasquale are separated.

The con men send Giuseppe a parcel filled with food and he shares it with his fellow inmates in his own cell. Another inmate, Arcangeli, finds a note in a piece of the bread Giuseppe shares. It is from Attilio's boss, and it instructs him not to expose his brother and comrades regarding the con. Giuseppe informs Pasquale; they agree not to divulge the truth.

Later, the boys are called into the police chief's office for questioning. Frustrated, the chief threatens to beat the information out of them. Another policeman takes Giuseppe into a side room to beat him. Hidden from Pasquale's view, Giuseppe is taken back to his cell but is not beaten. Instead, a policeman beats a sandbag with a belt, while another child pretends to be Giuseppe screaming in pain. Pasquale, to stop what he thinks is the beating of his friend, reveals the names of Panza and Attilio to the police chief.

Giuseppe discovers that Pasquale betrayed his brother, and he confronts Pasquale in front of the other inmates.

A file is planted in Pasquale's cell, and Pasquale is flogged. At their official court hearing, Giuseppe and Pasquale are respectively sentenced to one and two years in prison. Giuseppe commits to Arcangeli's escape plan. While a movie is being shown in the prison, they escape.

Pasquale tells the police chief where Giuseppe and Arcangeli went and leads them to where the horse is kept, but they get away on the horse. Pasquale runs off and finds Giuseppe and Arcangeli riding on their horse across a bridge. They dismount, and Arcangeli flees, but Giuseppe stays. Pasquale takes off his belt and starts to flog Giuseppe. Giuseppe falls off the bridge and hits his head on the rocks below and is apparently killed. Pasquale cries over his fallen friend's body as the police arrive and the horse trots off.

== Cast ==
- Franco Interlenghi as Pasquale Maggi
- Rinaldo Smordoni as Giuseppe Filippucci
- Annielo Mele as Raffaele
- Bruno Ortenzi as Arcangeli
- Emilio Cigoli as Staffera
- Maria Campi as Palmist (uncredited)

== Reception ==
Upon its release, Shoeshine received critical acclaim both in Italy and internationally. On the review aggregator Rotten Tomatoes, Shoeshine holds an rare approval rating of 100% based on 7 reviews, with an average score of 8.8/10.

James Agee's immediate response to the film was "Shoeshine is about as beautiful, moving, and heartening a film as you are ever likely to see."

== Legacy ==
Shoeshine is one of the early Italian neorealist films. In 1948, it received an Honorary Award at the Academy Awards for its high quality. This award was the precursor of what would later become the Academy Award for Best Foreign Language Film.

Pauline Kael, in a 1961 review published, commented: "Life, as Shoeshine demonstrates, is too complex for facile endings. Shoeshine was not conceived in the patterns of romance or melodrama; it is one of those rare works of art which seem to emerge from the welter of human experience without smoothing away the raw edges, or losing what most movies lose — the sense of confusion and accident in human affairs...The greatness of Shoeshine is in that feeling we get of human emotions that have not been worked-over and worked-into something (a pattern? a structure?) and cannot really be comprised in such a structure. We receive something more naked, something that pours out of the screen...Shoeshine has a sweetness and a simplicity that suggest greatness of feeling, and this is so rare in film works that to cite a comparison one searches beyond the medium — if Mozart had written an opera set in poverty, it might have had this kind of painful beauty...This tragic study of the corruption of innocence is intense, compassionate, and above all, humane."

Orson Welles said of Shoeshine: "What De Sica can do, that I can’t do. I ran his Shoeshine again recently and the camera disappeared, the screen disappeared; it was just life.”

The film inspired the comic book series Sciuscià, which ran from 1949 to 1956.
