= Lina Buffolente =

Italian cartoonist (1924–2007)

- Born: 27 October 1924; Vicenza, Italy
- Died: 6 March 2007 (aged 82); Milan, Italy
- Occupation: Cartoonist

Lina Buffolente (27 October 1924 – 6 March 2007) was an Italian cartoonist and illustrator.

== Life and career ==
Born in Vicenza, Buffolente graduated from the Brera Academy and started her career in 1941, collaborating with the cartoonist Giuseppe Cappadonia and illustrating short stories for the publisher Edital. In 1942 she created together with Leone Cimpellin her first comic strip series, Petto di Pollo, published by Edizioni Alpe.

After the war, Boffolente specialized in adventure and western comics, notably drawing the series Tom Mix, its spin-off Tom Bill, Hello Jim, Furio Mascherato. In 1948 she started an over twenty-year long collaboration with the publisher Editrice Universo, for which she realized various series including Liberty Kid for the magazine Intrepido and Fiordistella for Il Monello.

In the 1970s Boffolente illustrated Piccolo Ranger and created the series Gun Gallon, Homicron and Nick Reporter for the French market, and the series Reno Kid for the German market. Starting from 1990 she drew several Comandante Mark comic books.
