= Kinowa =

Italian comic book series

Publication information
- Genre: Western
- Publication date: 1950–1961

Creative team
- Written by: Andrea Lavezzolo
- Artist(s): EsseGesse

Kinowa is an Italian comic book series created by Andrea Lavezzolo and EsseGesse.

== Background ==
The Western comic series debuted in May 1950, with text by Andrea Lavezzolo (who signed the comics with the pen name A. Lawson) and artwork by the trio EsseGesse (Pietro Sartoris, Dario Guzzon and Giovanni Sinchetto), at their debut. When Essegesse passed to draw other comics - as Blek Macigno and Captain Miki - the stories of Kinowa were illustrated by Pietro Gamba. The main character of the series is Sam Boyle, a man that, scalped and left for dead after an attack on the convoy in which perished his wife and son, builds a duck skin mask with the likeness of the devil and, turned into the avenging spirit Kinowa, persecutes the descendants of his attackers.

The comics had a significant success in Turkey, where Kinowa became protagonist, between 1971 ad 1972, of three western-adventure films (Kinova - Demir Yumruk, Kara Seytan - Kinova 2 and Kam^ili Kadin - Kinova 3). It is considered as the initiator of the Italian western-gothic subgenre.

== See also ==
Other comics series created by Andrea Lavezzolo:

- Gim Toro (1946–1951)
- Tony Falco (1948–1949)
- Geky Dor (1949–1950)
- Il Piccolo Ranger (1958–1985)
