= Tanino Liberatore =

Italian comics author and illustrator

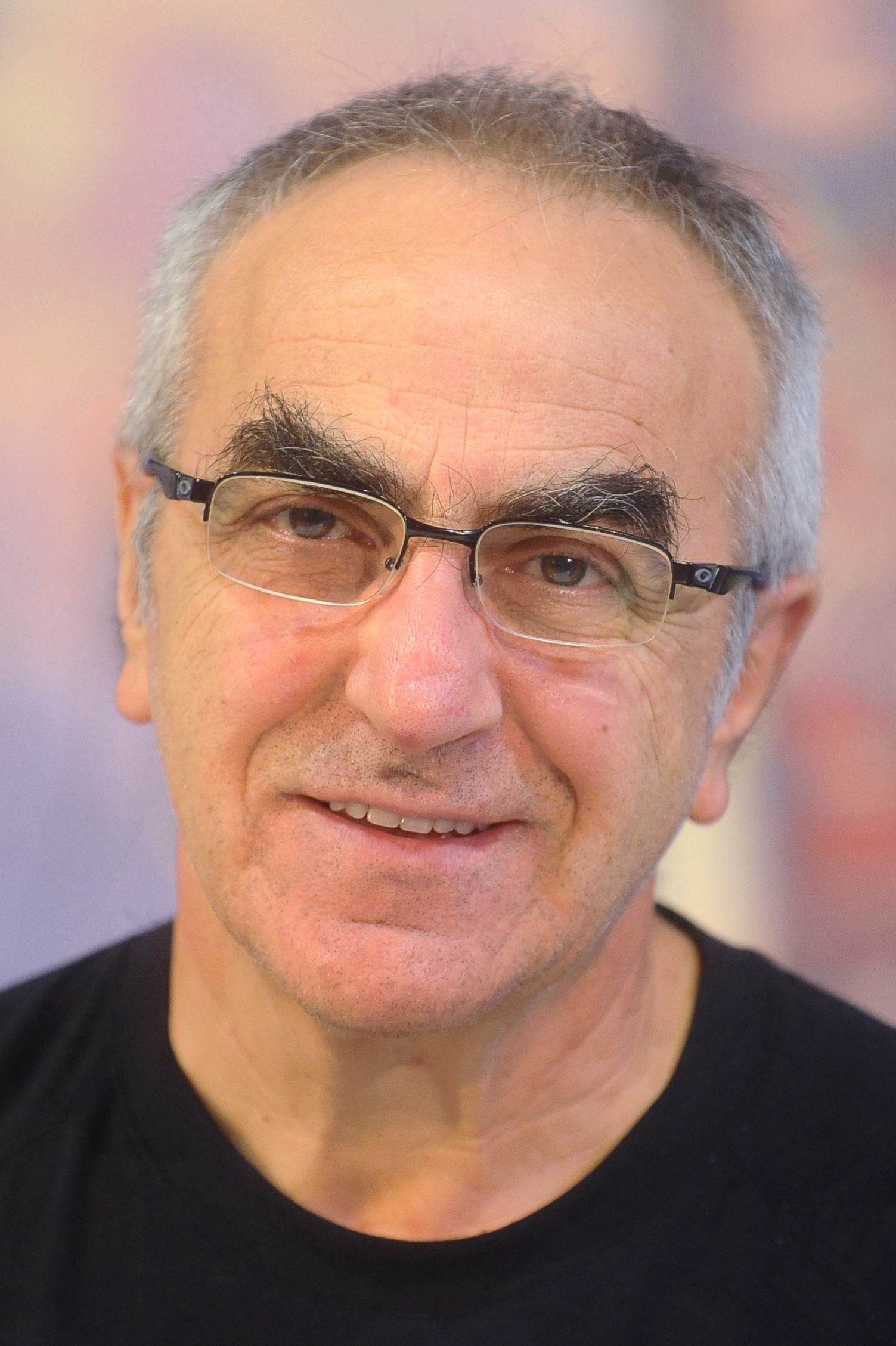
- Tanino Liberatore at Lucca Comics & Games 2015
- Born: Gaetano Liberatore; 12 April 1953 (age 73) Quadri, Italy
- Areas: Cartoonist, Writer, Artist, Publisher, Letterer
- Notable works: RanXerox
- Collaborators: Stefano Tamburini

Gaetano Liberatore (born 12 April 1953), better known as Tanino Liberatore, is an Italian comics creator. His best known fictional character is RanXerox.

== Life and work ==
Born in Quadri, Liberatore went to high school in Pescara where he met comics artist Andrea Pazienza. He later finished his architectural studies at the University of Rome. From 1974 to 1978, he designed record covers for RCA. In 1978 he met Stefano Tamburini and published his first work in Tamburini's comics magazine Cannibale. In 1978 RanXerox was born, a cyborg-punk, ultra strong creature created by Tamburini. Several stand alone hardcover albums ensued, translated in several languages. In 1980 he involved in the foundation of the magazine Frigidaire.

Liberatore's work has been republished in several international comics magazines (Transfert, Métal Hurlant, A Suivre, L'Écho des savanes, Chic). The cover of Frank Zappa's The Man from Utopia album features an illustration by Tanino Liberatore, showing Zappa as RanXerox. In 1984 he drew the album cover for Beat Up, the first 7-inch release by New York City based ska band The Toasters. During this time he also created a few 'one of a kind' pieces of art work for Toasters frontman Robert "Bucket" Hingley.

He has also done art direction for films.

== Bibliography ==
=== Comics ===
- RanXerox: Ranx in New York graphic novel
- RanXerox: Happy Birthday Lubna graphic novel
- RanXerox: Amen! graphic novel
- Liberatore: Video Clips graphic novel
- Savage Sword of Conan #97 [cover] (1974)
- Twisted Tales #7 (1982)
- Hustler Magazine: Honey Hooker comic (March 1984)
- Heavy Metal: Sax Blues + Cover (January 1985)
- Heavy Metal: Cover (March 1985)
- Batman: Black and White #3 (1996)
- Heavy Metal: The Full Monty (Fall 1999)
- Heavy Metal: Urban Legend (Fall 2000)
- Heavy Metal: Angel Dust (May 2001)
- Lucy L'Espoir (2007) Story of the prehistoric humanoid species Australopithecus afarensis found by Yves Coppens and named Lucy.

=== Art books ===
- Portrait De La Bete En Rock Star (Foreword by Frank Zappa, with fictional exploits written by Geof Darrow)
- The Universe of Liberatore
- Women of Liberatore
- Liberatore B&W
- Liberatore: Da Quadri a Parigi
- Liberatore: Penombre portfolio

=== Movies ===
- 24 Hours in the Life of a Woman (2002) Production Designer
- Asterix and Obelix Meet Cleopatra (2002) Costume Designer
- RRRrrrr!!! (2004) Art Department

=== Album covers ===
- Ivan Graziani – Agnese dolce Agnese (1978)
- Frank Zappa – The Man from Utopia (1983)
- Sal's African Rockers – Abel Lima (1984)
- The Toasters – Beat up (1984)
- Marsico – Funk Sumatra (1985)
- Szajner – Indecent Delit (1986)
- Gold – Laissez-Nous Chanter (1986)
- Destroy Man & JhonyGo – Egoiste (1987)
- Bijou – Lola (1988)
- Dick Rivers – Linda Lu Baker (1989)
- The Bloody Beetroots – Romborama (2009)
- The Bloody Beetroots – Hide (2013)
- La Femme – Mystère (2016)
