= Angelo Beccaria =

Italian painter (1820–1897)

Angelo Beccaria (May 1820 in Turin – 1897) was an Italian landscape painter active in the Piedmont.

Since the age of 18, he trained in the Accademia Albertina under Giovanni Battista Biscarra. As a young man he had a bout of visual loss, but continued to paint; the malady convinced him to abandon figure painting. A mentor in landscape painting was Massimo d' Azeglio. He was a colleague of Carlo Piacenza and Edoardo Perotti, and would travel to the mountains to paint outdoors. He served as a tutor for the Royal Family, including princes Amedeo and Oddone, and princesses Clotilde and Maria Pia. One of his pupils was Giuseppe Camino.

Among his works are Il mattino; La vita rustica; Passeggiata nel parco; Le Fienaiole di Val Sesia; Il approssimarsi del temporale; Il Guado; Il Crepuscolo; Betulle; and a number of watercolors.
