= Stefano Tamburini =

Italian graphic artist (1955–1986)

- Born: 18 August 1955 Rome, Italy
- Died: 1986 (aged 30–31) Rome, Italy
- Areas: Cartoonist, Writer, Artist, Publisher, Letterer
- Notable works: RanXerox, Snake Agent
- Collaborators: Tanino Liberatore

Stefano Tamburini (18 August 1955 – April 1986) was an Italian graphic artist, comics author and magazine publisher. Tamburini is primarily known as co-creator of the comic book character RanXerox, with Tanino Liberatore. Along with Andrea Pazienza, he is considered one of the most brilliant Italian comics authors from his generation.

== Biography ==
Born in Rome, Tamburini started writing in 1974. From 1975 to 1977 he worked for Stampa Alternativa, an independent publishing venture, designing books and leaflets. He also co-founded the magazines Combinazioni (1974), Cannibale (1977) and Frigidaire (1980).

Tamburini's first comics character, Fuzzy Rat, was published in Combinazioni. In 1978 Tamburini, together with artist Tanino Liberatore, created the comic book character RanXerox, a mechanical creature made from Xerox photocopier parts. Initially serialized in Frigidaire, RanXerox was eventually published as a graphic novel. Hailed as a highly innovative character embodying the spirit of the 1980s, RanXerox was eventually translated in English in 1983.

In 1983 Tamburini married the art gallerist Emi Fontana. He died in Rome in 1986 of a heroin overdose.
