= Andrea Bresciani =

Italian-born comics artist, illustrator, and animator

- Bresciani in 1966
- Born: Dušan Brešan; 29 January 1923; Tolmin, then Italy
- Died: 7 February 2006 (aged 83); Malvern, Victoria, Australia
- Occupations: Comics artist, illustrator, animator

Andrea Bresciani (29 January 1923 – 7 February 2006) was an Italian-born comics artist, illustrator, and animator of Slovenian origin. He was born Dušan Brešan in Tolmin (at the time part of Italy) and emigrated to Australia in 1950. Amongst his works were the Italian comic book series Geky Dor and Tony Falco and the widely syndicated Australian series Frontiers of Science. In the latter part of his career he worked as a film and television animator for Hanna-Barbera and Marvel Productions. Bresciani died in Malvern, Australia at the age of 83.

== Life and career ==
Bresciani was born Dušan Brešan to a Slovene family in Tolmino (at the time part of the Province of Gorizia in Italy but now a city in Slovenia). At the outbreak of World War II, his mother took Dušan and his two sisters to live near Milan. The family subsequently took the Italian surname "Bresciani", and he changed his first name to "Andrea". Entirely self-taught, Bresciani began his career as a commercial artist designing furniture for an architect in Milan while commuting from Pavia. After the war, he found a discarded Italian comic book on the train and decided to try earning extra money as a comics artist. After working for three months on a portfolio, he obtained work for the Milan-based comic book publisher Edizioni Alpe and began a full-time career as a comics artist. He then worked with Andrea Lavezzolo, illustrating Lavezzolo's comic series Tony Falco which ran from 1948 to 1949 and Geky Dor which ran from 1949 to 1950.

In late 1950 Bresciani emigrated to Australia, eventually settling in Sydney in 1951 where he worked for Atlas Publications, illustrating stories for Squire: A Man's Magazine and producing covers for their pulp fiction magazines and their comic books Flynn of the FBI and The Wraith as well as drawing whole issues of The Ghost Rider and Sergeant Pat of the Radio Patrol. The latter was based on two characters from the newspaper strip Radio Patrol. Bresciani went freelance after Atlas closed in the late 1950s. His work in the 1960s included illustrations for several pulp fiction magazines published by K.G. Murray. He also drew entire issues of the comic book The Adventures of Smoky Dawson, fictional stories with country-and-western singer Smoky Dawson as the protagonist. However, the work for which he was best known in this period was the daily strip Frontiers of Science which he drew from 1961 until 1970. Frontiers of Science was first published in the Sydney Morning Herald and was later syndicated to over 200 newspapers around the world.

In the early 1970s Bresciani, who had recently remarried, returned to Europe, working as a cartoonist and illustrator in Spain and Germany and extending his career to film. He worked as an animator, layout artist, and art director for Hanna-Barbera in Europe and later in Sydney when he returned to Australia. He also lived for a period in the Philippines in the early 1980s working at the Marvel Productions studio in Manila. Amongst his many film and television credits during this period were The New Scooby-Doo Movies (1972), Defenders of the Earth (1986), and Alice Through the Looking Glass (1987). In his later years Bresciani lived in the suburbs of Melbourne near his sisters and the children from his first marriage and devoted himself to sculpting horses. He died in his sleep at his home in Malvern at the age of 83.
