= Zanardi (comics) =

Comics character

Massimo Zanardi, known simply as Zanardi, is a comics character created by Andrea Pazienza, arguably his most famous creation.

He is the main actor in a series of graphic novels which appeared in installments on several Italian comics magazines between 1981 and 1988. Zanardi first appeared in Frigidaire magazine in 1981, in Giallo Scolastico ("High School Mystery"). The character quickly found an enthusiastic audience in the clique of young, artsy, new-waveish Italians who were disillusioned with the previous decade's political slant and were instantly hooked on the character's basic, hedonistic individualism and cynicism, tempered with cultural influences ranging from Joseph Conrad to Vladimir Mayakovsky.

The Zanardi graphic novels were reprinted several times in the decades following Pazienza's death, in original (black and white) and colored form. In 2018 Coconino Press has published Tutto Zanardi, collecting all the character's stories, with an introduction by Manuele Fior and an afterword by Oscar Glioti. Pazienza's original drawings were mostly colored by his wife, Marina Comandini, but some episodes have been coloured by unknown students in Bologna's Art School, to which Pazienza gave the original drawings on a whim.

== Character traits ==
Zanardi is a 21-year-old Italian high school student at the Liceo Scientifico Enrico Fermi in Bologna. He is a tall, blond, thin, and well-dressed son of a bourgeois family, and his distinctive physical feature is an exaggerated, prominent hooked nose. He is also a junkie. Beneath this façade, Zanardi is a schemer, who is always looking for either drugs or revenge, and always gets both in the end.

Zanardi is usually accompanied in his doings and wrongdoings by two schoolmates, Colasanti (full name: Roberto Colasanti) and Petrilli (full name: Sergio Petrilli, often in the endearing form Sergino, or "Little Sergio"), with whom he has established a sort of Clockwork Orange partnership. They serve as accomplices, foils, and occasional comic relief to Zanardi's archetypal amorality. It is worthy of notice that the three almost never address each other by name in conversation, resorting either to surnames (which automatically entails a sort of detachment in Italian) or to distortions of them, thus Zanardi becomes Zanna (fang); Colasanti becomes Colas; Petrilli becomes Pietra (literally stone or rock as a possible pun on drugs). It is also worthy of notice that although the three are almost always featured as spending a lot of their time together hanging out, they do not consider themselves as friends.

Colasanti is a very handsome, gym-sculpted cold boy who loves to hit on every girl he meets. But he is also an occasional rent boy who ruthlessly exploits his sexual power over men and women. In Giallo Scolastico, Colasanti helps Zanardi to blackmail a nerdy closeted schoolmate by sodomizing him while Zanardi photographs the act with a Polaroid stolen for the occasion, in order to force him to fetch compromising evidence from a teacher's house. Colasanti is usually Zanardi's helping hand in exacting revenge. At the same time, he suffers from his lack of culture and hipness and is prone to fits of rage every time his mates remind him he is "such an ignoramus".

Petrilli, while being the group's best-born and possibly best-educated member, is the eternal loser. He is constantly abused and humiliated by Zanardi and Colasanti, is often in love with some nameless and personality-less girl at the same high school he attends with Zanardi and Colasanti only to see her succumb to the charms of his hateful but more attractive friends, and always gets the short end of the stick in the shady dope deals Zanardi sets up. In fact, Petrilli dies a horrible death in the last story of the Frigidaire canon, Notte di Carnevale (Carnival Night), being burned alive in a Zanardi-staged prank arson of an all-female religious college that spirals out of control. Except the whole story is only a dream, to which Petrilli wakes in terror to run outside in the street and get run over by a truck. The character's death, however, only appears to be temporary, as in later stories Petrilli is still alive and being taken advantage of by his mates.

Many concepts and stories from Zanardi, along with Pentothal and some isolated vignettes, were adapted into a motion picture by Renato de Maria, Paz! (2002), which is more of an overall tribute to the work of Andrea Pazienza than an actual comic strip tie-in.

== Zanardi stories: Frigidaire canon (1981–1982) ==
- Giallo scolastico (High School Mystery)
- Pacco (Scam)
- Verde matematico (Mathematical Green)
- Notte di Carnevale (Carnival Night)

These stories originally appeared generally in black-and-white installments on Frigidaire magazine during 1981-1982, with the exception of Notte di carnevale that was conceived and published in colour. They were reprinted with colour by unknown Art School students in Zanardi, a collection published by Primo Carnera Editore in 1983, with a new black-and-white story tying the episodes together entitled La proprietà transitiva dell'uguaglianza (The Transitive Property of Equality). The volume was reprinted in 1998 by Baldini & Castoldi Editore as a "Critical Edition", with unreleased drawings and writings by Pazienza. The stories were re-coloured for the occasion by Marina Comandini. Giorno is considered as a prologue of sorts to Zanardi, in that it anticipates the storytelling conventions and some general themes, though neither Zanardi nor his mates appear in it.

== Zanardi stories: major non-Frigidaire episodes (1984–1985) ==
- Lupi (Wolves), colour by Andrea Pazienza, 1984
- La prima delle tre (The First Of The Three), black-and-white, 1985

These stories appeared on Corto Maltese magazine and alter alter, and represent significant developments in the Zanardi "universe", though removed from the original series which gained Pazienza nationwide success as a comics artist.

== Zanardi stories: scattered episodes (1983–1988) ==
- Massimo Zanardi, l'inesistente (The Nonexistent), 1983
- Zanardi (also catalogued as La cravatta), 1984
- Prologo (Prologue), 1986
- I modi: Cuore di mamma (The Ways: Heart Of Mother), 1986
- I modi: Cenerentola 1987 (The Ways: Cinderella 1987), 1987
- Zanna (Fang), 1987
- Zanardi at the war, 1987
- Zanardi medievale (aka Zanardi In The Middle Ages), 1987-88
- Storiella bianca (Little White Tale), 1988
- La logica del fast-food (The Logic Of Fast-Food), 1988

These stories appeared in Frigidaire and Comic Art magazines and various collections by Editori Del Grifo. They represent humorous, metaphysical or very crude extensions to the Zanardi character, which Pazienza continued to elaborate until his death in 1988.

* 'Storiellina inedita di Zanardi', published posthumously in ''Paz. Scritti, disegni, fumetti'', Einaudi, 1997
