= Pietro Fea =

Italian painter (1771–1842)

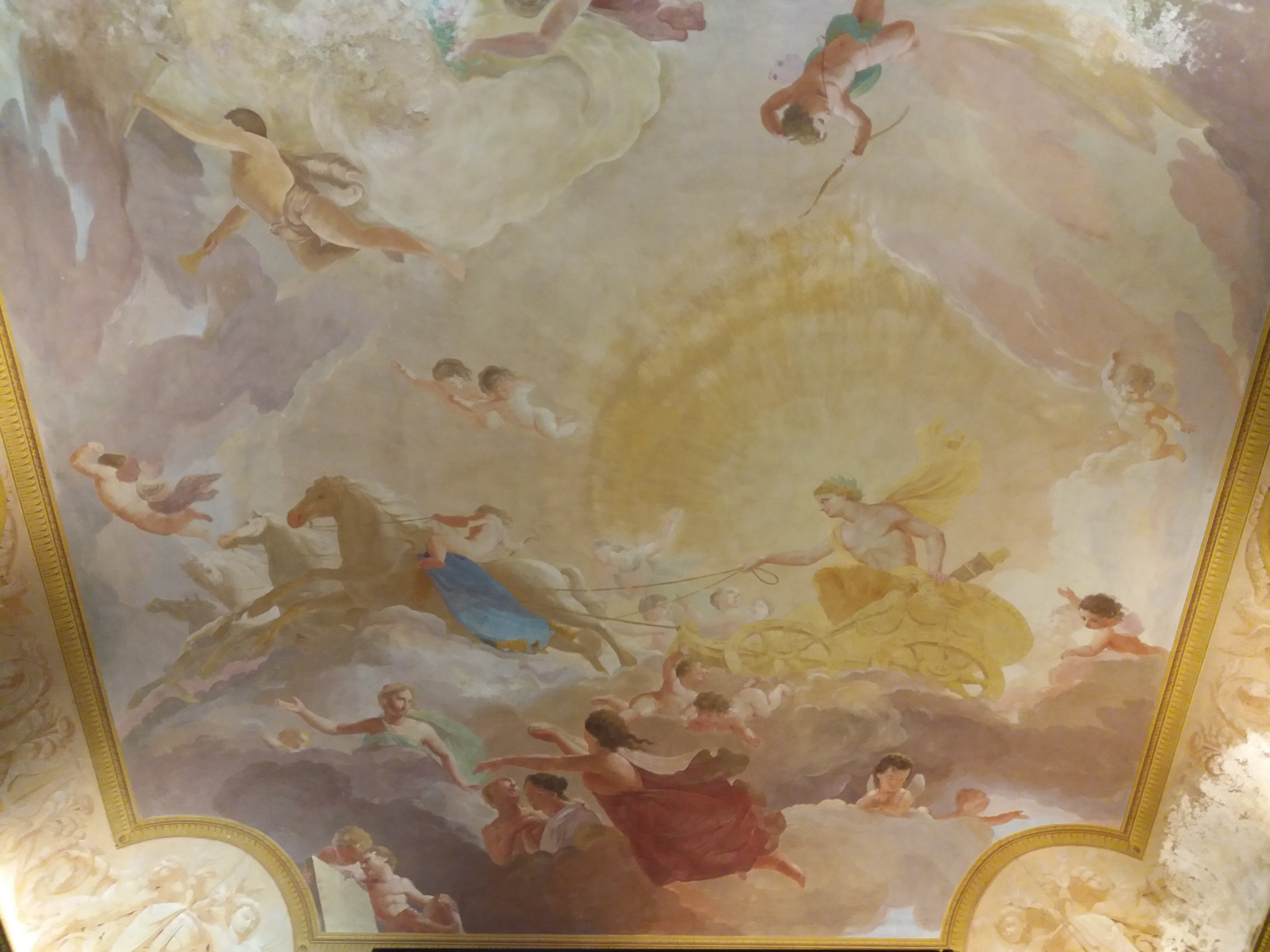
"Carro del Sole", Palazzo Doria-Tursi.

Pietro Fea (7 August 1771 – 15 April 1842) was an Italian painter.

He was born in Casale Monferrato to a town merchant; but orphaned at a young age, he apprenticed with Giovanni Galliari, who was active in painting at the Teatro Regio di Torino. He then became a pupil of Laurent Pêcheux in Turin. In 1805, he built an ephemeral celebration float for the visit of Napoleon to Turin. He gained patronage of the Savoy Court, including painting for the Royal Govone Castle and now-lost frescoes for the ball-room of the Royal Palace of Turin. In 1825, he decorated some rooms of the Palazzo Doria-Tursi in Genoa. He painted frescoes for the Palazzo del Pozzo in Moncalvo. In 1829, he painted frescoes for the church of San Lorenzo in Turin. That year, he was named professor of perspective for the Accademia Albertina. One of his pupils was Carlo Piacenza. He died in Casalborgone.
