= Frontiers of Science =

- Author(s): Stuart Butler, Robert Raymond
- Illustrator(s): Andrea Bresciani (1961–1970); David Emerson (1970–1987)
- Launch date: 1961
- End date: 1987
- Syndicate(s): Over 200 newspapers worldwide
- Publisher(s): University of Sydney (archive); softcover editions
- Genre(s): Science, Education

Frontiers of Science was an illustrated comic strip created by Professor Stuart Butler of the School of Physics at the University of Sydney in collaboration with Robert Raymond, a documentary maker from the Australian Broadcasting Corporation (ABC) in 1961. The artist was Andrea Bresciani. After 1970 the comic was illustrated by David Emerson.

It explained scientific concepts and recent research and in a 3 or 4 panel illustrated strip in an accessible and easily comprehensible way. The strip was syndicated to over 200 newspapers around the world for 25 years, from 1961 to 1987. It was also published as soft cover books. As of 2011, it "retains the record of being the longest-running newspaper science comic strip in the world."

The strips are archived at Rare Books and Special Collections in Fisher Library at the University of Sydney. The entire series is available for viewing online.

Strip sample from late 1960s illustrating ocean exploration with the future Ben Franklin (PX-15)
