= RanXerox =

Comic-book character

- Date: 1978–1993

Creative team
- Creators: Stefano Tamburini (writer); Tanino Liberatore (artist)

Original publication
- Language: Italian

RanXerox (also known as Ranx) is an Italian science fiction graphic novel series by writer Stefano Tamburini and artist Tanino Liberatore, two Italian comics creators who had worked on such magazines as Cannibale and Frigidaire. Conceived as a bizarre antihero, RanXerox is a mechanical creature made from Xerox photocopier parts.

The character first appeared as Rank Xerox in the June 1978 issue of the Italian magazine Cannibale. The name was based on Rank Xerox, a photocopier company formed by the Haloid Company and Britain's Rank Organisation. After Rank Xerox threatened legal action over the use of its name, the character was renamed Ranxerox in 1980. The renamed series appeared in Frigidaire that November.

Richard Corben said about the character:

Ranxerox is a punk, futuristic Frankenstein monster, and with the under-aged Lubna, they are a bizarre Beauty and the Beast. This artist and writer team have turned a dark mirror to the depths of our Id and we see reflected the base part of ourselves that would take what it wants with no compromise, no apology – and woe to the person who would cross us. But it is all done with a black, wry, satirical sense of humor.

Tanino Liberatore used Pantone markers and pencils in his comics artwork. He also created the artwork for the Frank Zappa album The Man from Utopia; the image of Zappa on the cover bears a strong resemblance to Ranxerox.

Ranx: The Video Game was released in 1990 by Ubisoft for MS-DOS, Amiga, and Atari ST.

== English-language publications ==
RanXerox was serialized in Heavy Metal from July 1983 through May 1984. The later story Amen! appeared in the July, September and November 1997 issues.

The three principal albums received the following English-language editions:

- RanXerox in New York — Catalan Communications, 1984; issued by Heavy Metal in 1996 as Ranx 1: Ranx in New York (ISBN 1-882931-30-0).
- Happy Birthday, Lubna — Catalan Communications, 1985; issued by Heavy Metal in 1996 as Ranx 2: Happy Birthday Lubna (ISBN 1-882931-31-9).
- Amen! — Heavy Metal, 1996, as Ranx 3: Amen! (ISBN 1-882931-32-7).

The three Heavy Metal paperbacks were subsequently reprinted in 2002–2003. In 2026, Heavy Metal issued a collected Ranx hardcover through its Heavy Metal Library campaign.
