= Jonny Logan =

Italian humorous comic book series

Publication information
- Genre: humor, adventure
- Publication date: 1971-1978
- No. of issues: 77

Creative team
- Written by: Romano Garofalo
- Artist: Leone Cimpellin

Jonny Logan is an Italian humorous comic book series, created in 1971 by Romano Garofalo as writer and by Leone Cimpellin (under the pen name "Ghilbert") as artist and was published monthly by Edizioni Dardo.

== Background ==
The comic series, similar in its structure to Alan Ford, featured a Milanese crackpot team of bounty hunters grappling with topical problems of the Italy of the time, such as terrorism, mafia infiltration in politics, abrogative referendum about divorce, taxes, and internal emigration. The comics achieved a large commercial success, with a circulation of over 100,000 copies per month and a number of fan clubs all over Italy. The series was also published in France, Greece and Jugoslavia.

The title character was inspired in his traits by the actor and comedian Lando Buzzanca, at the time at the peak of his popularity.

In the second half of seventies the success start to decline, and the series was interrupted in December 1978; seventy-seven issues were released in total.

In 2012, on the occasion of the 40th anniversary of the comic series, a special issue was published in digital form.

A series of animation shorts was produced for the RAI TV-series Supergulp.
