= Leone Cimpellin =

Italian comic artist (1926–2017)

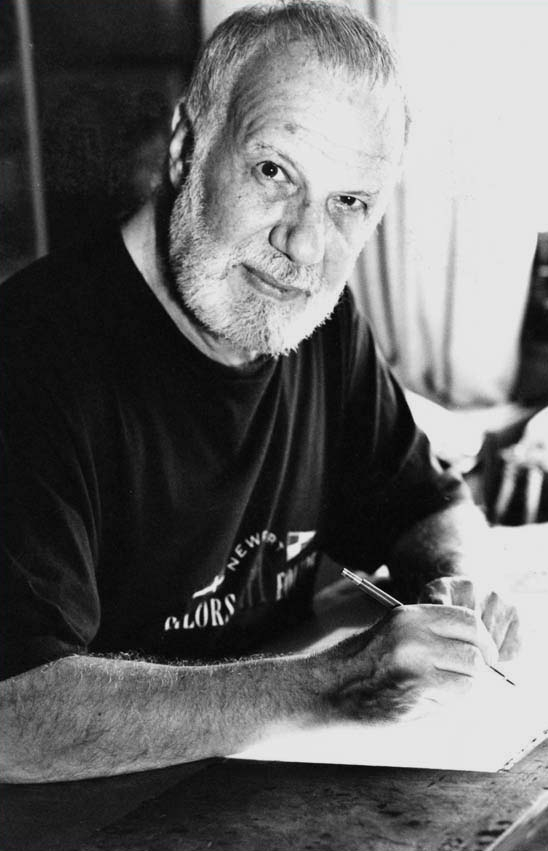
- Cimpellin in 1993
- Born: 6 June 1926; Rovigo, Italy
- Died: 27 March 2017 (aged 90); Milan, Italy
- Other names: Ghilbert
- Occupation: Comic artist

Leone Cimpellin (6 June 1926 – 27 March 2017) was an Italian comic artist. He was sometimes credited under the pen name Ghilbert.

== Life and career ==
Born on 6 June 1926, in Rovigo, Cimpellin spent his childhood in Milan and at very young age he started his career as assistant of Lina Buffolente, with whom in 1942 he created his first comic strip, Petto di Pollo, published by Edizioni Alpe.

After the war, Cimpellin started an autonomous career illustrating the Italo-produced comic books of Casey Ruggles (Red Carson in Italy) with scripts of Mario Uggeri and then drawing Gian Luigi Bonelli's Plutos. In 1953, after collaborating with Guido Martina for the series Pecos Bill and Oklahoma, he became part of the permanent staff of the children magazine Corriere dei Piccoli, for which he created dozens of series, notably Codinzolo, Gibernetta, Tribunzio, Charlie Sprint, Gigi Buzz.

In 1971, Cimpellin co-created with Romano Garofalo his best known work, the satirical comic series Jonny Logan, which run until 1978. After the series closed, he collaborated with several publications, including Corriere dei Piccoli, Gazzetta del Popolo, Più. He died on 27 March 2017, aged 90, in Milan.
