= Gianluigi Coppola =

Italian illustrator

Gianluigi Coppola (Chiavari, 16 April 1928 - Genoa, 24 August 2015) was an Italian illustrator and cartoonist.

== Biography ==
After completing art high school, in 1949 he moved to Milan where he began to illustrate for Goal, a comic book published by the Gazzetta dello Sport; he then collaborated with authors such as Ferdinando Tacconi in the Nat del Santa Cruz series and Franco Paludetti in the Sciuscià series.

He moved to England in 1956, where for over twenty years he worked as a draftsman creating various series such as Billy the Kid published in Sun, and others such as Scoop Donovan and Battler Britton.

In the early 1960s, he stopped working as a cartoonist to devote himself to the illustration of books for Penguin Books, as well as making covers for novels published by various publishing houses such as Corgi, Fontana, Collins, Pan, and Granada. He also dedicated himself to advertising collaborating with periodicals such as Forum, The Observer, and Psychology Today.

He returned to Italy in 1979 where he began collaborating with Arnoldo Mondadori with illustrations for classic novels for boys as well as covers of the Oscar series. He also collaborated with the magazines Playboy and Penthouse. Returning to work on comics in 1990, he realized for the Sergio Bonelli Editore some stories of the Dylan Dog and Martin Mystère series; after this experience, he returned to devote himself to illustration and painting.
