= Geky Dor =

Italian comic book series by Andrea Lavezzolo

- Cover of the first issue, 20 November 1949

Publication information
- Publisher: Edizioni Popolari Moderne
- Genre: Action/adventure
- Publication date: November 1949 – April 1950
- No. of issues: 20

Creative team
- Written by: Andrea Lavezzolo
- Artist(s): Andrea Bresciani

Geky Dor was an Italian comic book series created and written by Andrea Lavezzolo with illustrations by Andrea Bresciani. It was published weekly in 20 issues from 1949 to 1950.

== Background ==
Inspired by a newspaper story, the series recounts the adventures of Geky Dor, a youth who turns detective to clear the name of his father who had been wrongly accused of murder. Geky is accompanied in his adventures by Salvatore, a tramp whom he had befriended. A mysterious figure known only as "il fantasma" (the ghost) intervenes at various points to rescue the pair from danger. Geky Dor was the third major comic character created by Lavezzolo, and the second on which he and Bresciani collaborated. The first issue, published on 20 November 1949, was entitled Doloroso ritorno (Sad Return). The last issue and concluding episode, La vittoria del fantasma (The Ghost's Victory), was published on 9 April 1950. The series was republished in 1954 in the children's magazine, Il Giornalino di Lucky with the protagonist's name changed to "Teddy Len". The entire series was republished in facsimile and under its original name in 1978 by the Associazione Nazionale Amici del Fumetto.

== See also ==
Other comics series created by Andrea Lavezzolo:

- Gim Toro (1946–1951)
- Tony Falco (1948–1949)
- Kinowa (1950–1961)
- Il Piccolo Ranger (1958–1985)
