= Paolo Eleuteri Serpieri =

Italian comic book writer and illustrator

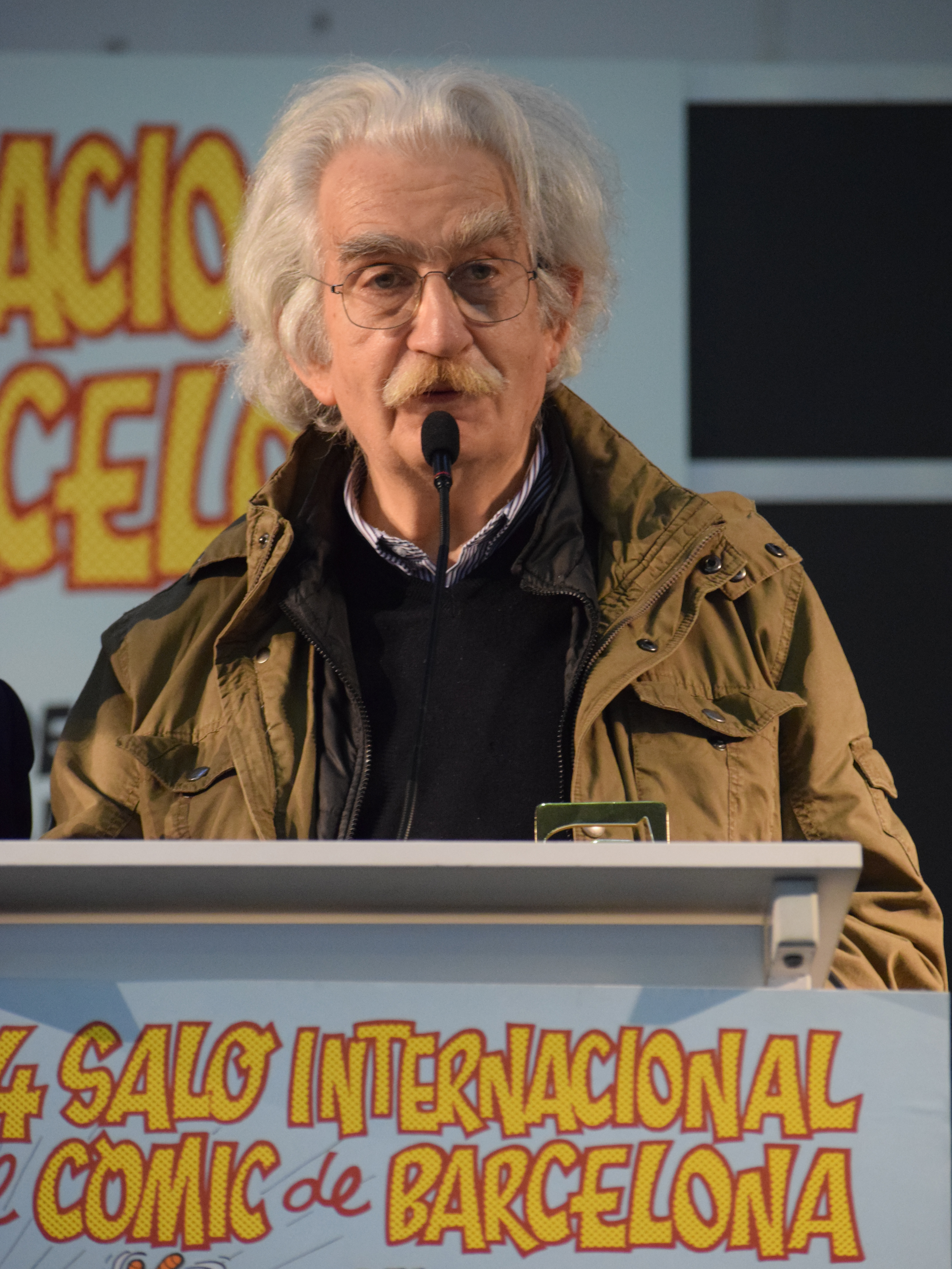
- Serpieri at the 2016 Barcelona International Comics Convention
- Born: Paolo Eleuteri Serpieri; 29 February 1944 (age 82) Venice, Italy
- Areas: artist, writer
- Notable works: Druuna saga
- Awards: Harvey Award, 1995

Paolo Eleuteri Serpieri (born 29 February 1944) is an Italian comic book writer and illustrator, noted for his works of highly detailed renderings of the human form, particularly erotic images of women. He is best known for his work on the Druuna erotic science fiction series.

== Early career ==
Paolo Eleuteri Serpieri was born on 29 February 1944 in Venice. He moved to Rome in his youth. He studied architecture and painting at Rome's Fine Arts Academy in Rome under Renato Guttuso, and began his career as a painter in 1966, but in 1975 he shifted his focus to comics. He produced work for the Italian comics magazine Lanciostory. A big fan of the American Old West, Serpieri co-created L'Histoire du Far-West (The Story of the West), a Western series about the history of the Old West, with writer Raffaele Ambrosio, which was published in the magazines Lanciostory and Skorpio. Some of the titles were L'Indiana Bianca (The White Indian) and L'Uomo di Medicina (Medicine Man). Beginning in 1980 Serpieri worked on collections like Découvrir la Bible, as well as short stories for magazines such as L'Eternauta, Il Fumetto and Orient Express.

== Druuna ==
In 1985, he published Morbus Gravis, the first work of the Druuna saga. The series is noteworthy and controversial for featuring realistic and explicit content including graphic violence and sexual content. These books have been very successful, selling more than a million copies in twelve languages. The English language translations are published by Heavy Metal.

Due to the interest in this series, Serpieri has also published numerous sketchbooks, such as Obsession, Druuna X, Druuna X 2, Croquis, Serpieri Sketchbook, Serpieri Sketchbook 2 and The Sweet Smell of Woman. Serpieri's highly detailed portrayals of well-endowed heroines have earned him the distinction of "Master of the Ass".

Serpieri is also credited with design work on the 3D video game Druuna: Morbus Gravis, based on his heroine.

== Awards ==
- 1995: Harvey Award for Best American Edition of Foreign Material
- 1997 U Giancu's Prize

== Selected bibliography ==
- Morbus Gravis (Severe Disease) (1985, Dargaud, ISBN 3-933187-69-9)
- Druuna (1987, Dargaud, ISBN 2-908406-63-2)
- Creatura (1990, Bagheera, ISBN 3-933187-71-0)
- Carnivora (1992, Bagheera, ISBN 3-933187-72-9)
- Mandragora (1995, Bagheera, ISBN 2-908406-32-2)
- Aphrodisia (1997, Bagheera, ISBN 2-908406-69-1)
- La Planète oubliée (The Forgotten Planet) (2000, Bagheera, ISBN 2-908406-60-8)
- Clone (2003, Bagheera, ISBN 2-908406-72-1)
- Anima (2016)
