= In Italia sono tutti maschi =

- 2008 edition
- Creator: Luca de Santis
- Date: 2008
- Page count: 173 pages
- Publisher: Kappa Edizioni

In Italia sono tutti maschi (In Italy All Are Males) is a 2008 graphic novel written by Luca de Santis, illustrated by Sara Colaone and published by Kappa Edizioni. The novel tells the story of gay people exiled under the fascist rule of Benito Mussolini.

In 2009, the novel won the Attilio Micheluzzi Prize at Napoli Comicon for "Best comic of the year". The novel has been translated into a number of European languages: the French, Belgian and Canadian French under the title En Italie il n'y a que vrais hommes, published by Dargaud, for the German market under the title Insel der Männer Schreiber und Leser Ed, for the Polish market under the title We Włoszech wszyscy SA mężczyznami Centrala Editions and for the Spanish market with the title En Italia son todos machos, Norma Editorial.

== Plot ==
It tells the story of the confinement of homosexuals during Fascist Italy and more precisely the last year of exile (1939–1940), of a group of men to San Domino in the Tremiti Islands archipelago. The story of the protagonist Antonio "Ninella" Angelicola during his confinement is intertwined in a second-floor time set in the late 80s with that of the young documentary filmmaker Rocco. The events recounted in the book and the characters are drawn from true stories and real people. In particular, the story is based on the life of Joseph B., ("Peppinella"), who was also interviewed by his real name in Gabriella Romano's docu-drama, Ricordare.
