= Gim Toro =

Comic book series

Creative team
- Written by: Andrea Lavezzolo
- Artist(s): Edgardo Dell'Acqua

Gim Toro is an Italian comic book series created by Andrea Lavezzolo and Edgardo Dell'Acqua. It was in syndication from 1946 until 1951.

== Background ==
Published in 1946 in an eponymous comic book series, the comics had an immediate success; in 1947 the main series was joined by the parallel series Gimtorissimo, still written by Lavezzolo but with illustrations by other artists. The success lasted until the beginning of 1950, and the series ended in 1951. It was republished several times until the second half of seventies. The main character, Gim Toro, is an Italian-American by the appearance of actor Tyrone Power.

== See also ==
Other comics series created by Andrea Lavezzolo:

- Tony Falco (1948–1949)
- Geky Dor (1949–1950)
- Kinowa (1950–1961)
- Il Piccolo Ranger (1958–1985)
