= Quadri =

- Comune
- Comune di Quadri
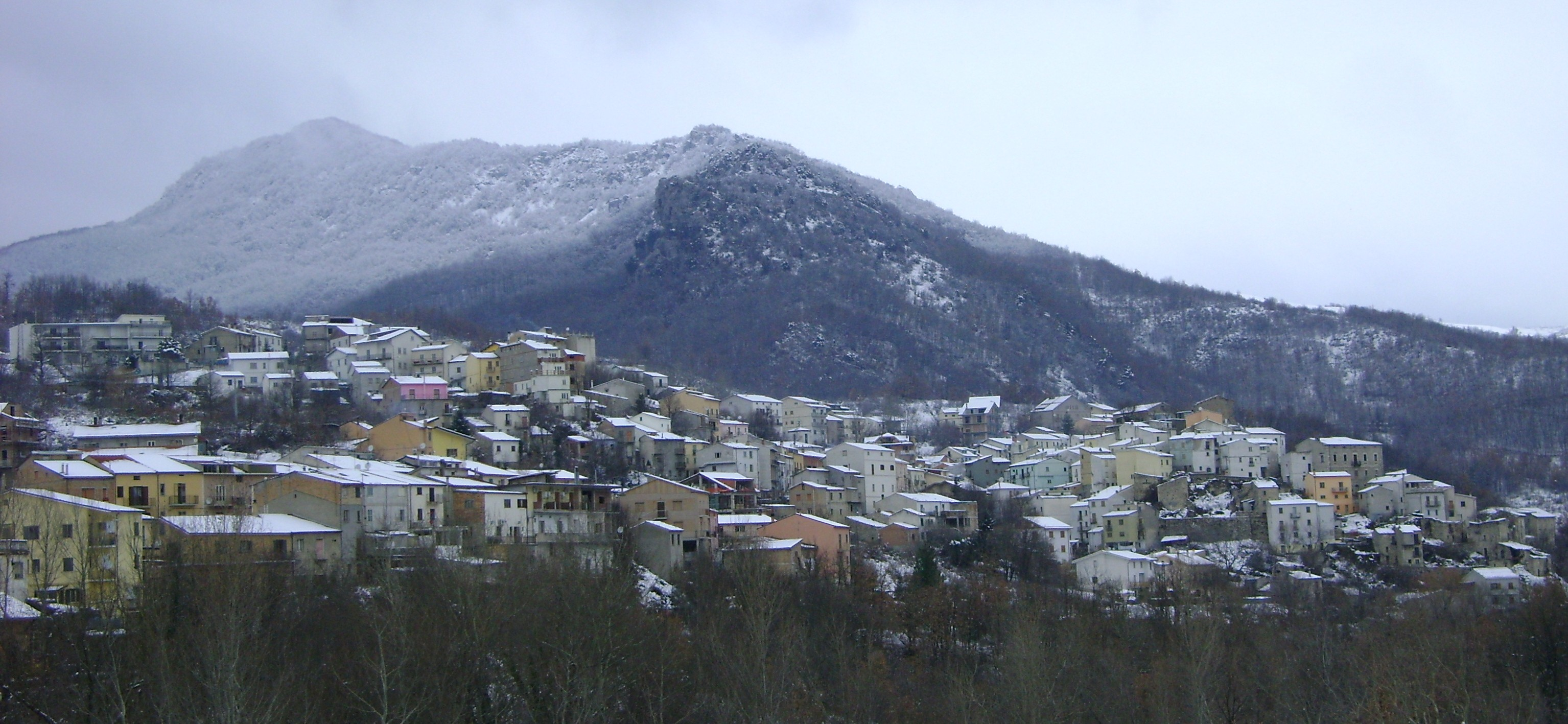
- View of Quadri

- Location within Italy Location within Abruzzo
- Coordinates: 41°56′N 14°17′E
- Country: Italy
- Region: Abruzzo
- Province: Chieti (CH)
- Frazioni: Mastarcangelo, Pamparièlle

Area
  - Total: 7.41 km^{2} (2.86 sq mi)
- Elevation: 590 m (1,940 ft)

Population (2021)
  - Total: 719
  - Density: 97.0/km^{2} (251/sq mi)
- Demonym: Quadresi
- Time zone: UTC+1 (CET)
  - Summer (DST): UTC+2 (CEST)
- Postal code: 66040
- Dialing code: 0872
- Patron saint: Saint Sebastian
- Saint day: 20 January
- Website: comune.quadri.ch.it

Quadri is a comune and town in the province of Chieti in the Abruzzo region of Italy.
