= Andrea Pazienza =

Italian artist (1956–1988)

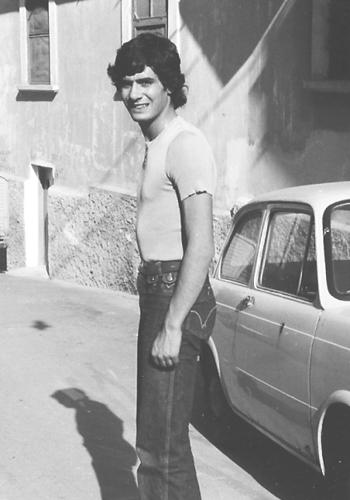
- Pazienza in 1974
- Born: Andrea Michele Vincenzo Ciro Pazienza; 23 May 1956; San Benedetto del Tronto, Marche, Italy
- Died: 16 June 1988 (aged 32); Montepulciano, Tuscany, Italy
- Education: University of Bologna

Andrea Michele Vincenzo Ciro Pazienza (Italian: [patˈtsjɛntsa]; 23 May 1956 – 16 June 1988) was an Italian comics artist and painter.

== Biography ==
=== Early life ===
Pazienza was born in San Benedetto del Tronto, Marche, in 1956. Growing up in his father's town of San Severo in Apulia, he enrolled in 1974 at the Department of Arts, Music, and Entertainment of the University of Bologna.

=== Career ===
He debuted in early 1977 in the magazine Alteralter, with his first comic story, "Le straordinarie avventure di Pentothal" (Pentothal's extraordinary adventures), a surreal, psychedelic story of an alter ego named after the sedative Penthothal. He later contributed to editorial projects, such as Cannibale, Il Male, and Frigidaire, of which he was one of the founders. In these publications, he created hundreds of comics, influenced by American underground comics and Walt Disney. He was especially fond of the character Goofy, which he appropriated for a humorous spoof on Italian hippiedom of the 1970s entitled Perché Pippo sembra uno sballato ("Why Goofy Looks Like a Pothead"), and a later, unfinished story entitled La leggenda di Italianino Liberatore ("The Legend of Italianino Liberatore", referring to his old friend Tanino Liberatore).

Pazienza developed a personal body of work, alternating between playful comic cartooning—at times politically charged–and much more elaborate, dark, disturbing graphic novels, often dealing with drugs and wanton violence, with a scattering of black humour throughout.

In 1980, he created the character Zanardi, which first appeared in Giallo scolastico and was later published in Frigidaire, in 1981. In 1983, Pazienza contributed stories to Linus, Alter Alter, Corto Maltese, and Comic Art. He also produced movie and theatre posters, scene designs, record covers, and advertising. He was extremely prolific through the 1980s, penning hundreds of single-panel cartoons as well as longer, intricate stories usually centred on Zanardi. Pompeo, his last graphic novel, which depicts the gradual downfall of a heroin addict (a largely autobiographical character) up to his eventual suicide, is generally considered his masterwork; the postface to this work testifies that Pazienza tried to start a new life and, for a while, quit drugs.

=== Death and legacy ===
Andrea Pazienza died at age 32 in Montepulciano from a heroin overdose.

The nonprofit association Centro Fumetto Andrea Pazienza was created in his honour to help young cartoonists develop their skills.

In 2011, Pazienza was named the first of 150 Italians, on a list of the country's most influential people, created for the 150th anniversary of Italian unification.

== Selected works ==
- Aficionados
- Andrea Pazienza (1981)
- Le straordinarie avventure di Pentothal (1982)
- Milo Manara e Andrea Pazienza (1982) – referring to Milo Manara
- Zanardi (1983)
- Perché Pippo sembra uno sballato (1983)
- Pertini (1983) – an homage to former President of the Italian Republic Alessandro Pertini
- Glamour Book (1984)
- Tormenta (1985)
- Cattive Compagnie (1985)
- Glamour Book 2 (1987)
- Pazeroticus (1987)
- Zanardi e altre storie (1987)
- Pompeo (1987)
