= Druuna =

- Druuna by Paolo Eleuteri Serpieri

Publication information
- Publisher: Dargaud
- First appearance: Morbus Gravis (1985)
- Created by: Paolo Eleuteri Serpieri

Druuna is an erotic science fiction and fantasy comic book character created by Italian cartoonist Paolo Eleuteri Serpieri. Most of Druuna's adventures revolve around a post-apocalyptic future, and the plot is often a vehicle for varied scenes of hardcore pornography and softcore sexual imagery. Druuna is frequently depicted as sparsely clothed or nude, and Serpieri's high quality renditions of her are often reproduced as poster prints.

Druuna starred in nine volumes of the Morbus Gravis (Severe Disease) series between 1985 and 2018. These stories were featured prominently in Métal hurlant and Heavy Metal magazines. Druuna has also been featured in Serpieri's numerous and popular sketchbooks, which have sold more than a million copies in twelve languages. Serpieri himself appears in many of the stories as the character Doc. (Although her character appears in Anima: Les Origines (2016), that book is not part of the Druuna series and is outside their narrative arcs.)

Druuna is the main character of a later prequel trilogy neither written nor drawn by Serpieri, which depicts the events leading up to Morbus Gravis. The first volume titled Druuna - Au Commencement: Espoirs was published in February 2022, the second one titled Druuna - Au Commencement: Genesis published in November 2023, and the third titled Druuna - Au Commencement: Diabolicus Morbus in February 2026.

== Morbus Gravis ==
=== Plot ===
During the more than thirty years of publication of Druuna's adventures in Morbus Gravis, the plot has evolved through several stages, differentiated with numerous jumps in the storyline, with some attendant inconsistencies.

In the first volumes in the series, the action unfolds in a place called The City, a futuristic but degraded urban environment. Humans live in a cramped, hostile, and decadent society, controlled by a religious oligarchy based on the knowledge of "Truth." In this society, books are banned and power is exercised by a corrupt and despotic militarized bureaucracy.

Although never clearly stated, this current era, known as the "Age of Man", is presumed to be the aftermath of a war. As told by the priests, an incurable, infectious disease called Evil has spread among the population that transforms people in a progressive and rapid fashion into amorphous, tentacled mutants. As a precautionary measure, all of the City's inhabitants are forcibly injected with a serum periodically distributed in overcrowded health facilities. Many believe that those found to be "healthy" will be sent to the City's upper levels, a place inaccessible to the majority but where those selected enjoy a better life free from want and hardship. Similarly, those infected with "Evil" are sent to the lower levels. Druuna and her lover Shastar exist in this environment.

After a series of adventures, Druuna discovers that the City is actually a giant spaceship which left Earth after an unspecified cataclysm and has drifted through space for centuries. At some point, Lewis, the ship's captain, delegated control to the computer Delta, which is responsible for creating the current state of affairs. (The Priests are actually androids operated by Delta.) Delta transformed Lewis into an immortal being, using organic parts from the healthy people who had been admitted to the upper levels of the City. Now, Lewis, tired of immortality, wants to die, which would eliminate Delta and destroy the City. This conflict is partially responsible for the gradual degradation of life on the ship/planetoid.

Druuna is recruited by Lewis to help him destroy Delta. Unaware of fact that it would mean destruction of the City and all its inhabitants, Druuna finds Delta and carries out Lewis's plan. At the end, Lewis reveals his true plan to destroy the City, but also confesses he fell in love with her and changes his mind about destruction. In turn, Lewis puts Druuna in a state similar to hibernation for centuries, waiting for an opportunity to improve conditions on the City. The story then introduces a man named Will, who commands another ship, similar to the City, which has become, thanks to the evolution of Evil, a super-organism. It is revealed that apart from the City, humanity is not entirely extinguished, but that other groups of humans survived, using genetic engineering to improve their abilities.

Embarking on Commander Will's spacecraft, Druuna discovers that the minds of Shastar and Lewis have been merged and transferred to the new ship's computer. The disease called Evil appears among the new ship's crew, so Will and Doc (author Serpieri's alter-ego) telepathically introduce Druuna into the mind of Lewis-Shastar, discovering the elements that make up the antidote serum. When Druuna gets trapped in the computer mind, Will enters it to rescue her. Discovering that they actually have no means to develop a cure for the disease, they decide to destroy the ship and crew (as well as the computer that houses the merged minds of Shastar and Lewis). Druuna, Will, and a few others escape in a rescue capsule, where they are all put into a state of suspended animation.

After the capsule crashes on an unknown planet, Druuna awakens alone. She is soon caught in a war between two alien species, one of which is composed of parasitic beings who need organic specimens as hosts, and the other of intelligent robots pursuing the objective of creating organic life. Apparently, the planet is Earth thousands of years after a war between men and machines resulted in the extinction of the former. The machines want to recreate their creators to try to understand humanity. Will briefly reappears and is kidnapped. Shastar also reappears, now working with the machines in their aim to recover the human species. Toward that aim, they decide to clone Druuna.

In Came From The Wind (2018) Druuna (in fact, Druuna's clone) finds herself, without memory, in what seems a new world or dimension filled with fields and occupied by Native Americans and the first European settlers, only to find out that not only does man's cruelty reign there, but a form of the "sickness" also seems to be present.

Druuna – Au commencement. Première partie – Espoirs (2022) seems to take place some time before the previous stories, and shows what we assume is Druuna, and several other well known characters, in a time before the events told in Morbus Gravis- she has a different lover and also seems to be a bit different. After being abused by men from the armed forces that rule the city, Druuna and her lover (who was selected to be moved away from the city) choose to run away together and have to deal with monsters, soldiers and escaped scientists. During their escape, Druuna learns not only that she will take any abuse to save the ones she loves but also that she has special abilities. The first volume of this new prequel series ends with Druuna making her way to a strange tower, her fate unknown.

Druuna - Au Commencement - Partie 2 - Genesis (2023) picks up where "Espoirs" ended. Druuna is suddenly left alone and her adventures follow from there in a somewhat different tone from the original stories. It's extremely graphical like some of the volumes drawn by Serpieri, but most of the complexity of Druuna's personality shown in the previous volumes seems to be gone. She loses her lover, cries for a minute, then moves on like nothing special had happened. Most of the narrative does not concern Druuna directly, but it's a tale of one of the last women on Earth, told to her by an A.I. in a story that seems a homage to the black-and-white pulp comics from the seventies/eighties. Druuna is then summoned to perform a special mission connected to the tale she heard... that apparently will be the theme of the last volume of this prequel trilogy.

=== Character ===
In most cases, Druuna's role is that of a willing sexual object, submitting to sexual advances of all kinds with little or no complaint, other than the occasional sad pout, though she has been raped on more than one occasion in the series. Serpieri claims that the character's approach to sexual pleasures is a challenge to Judeo-Christian mores on sexuality.

Druuna is usually depicted as a character that does not have much agency, basically being dragged around by other characters or going where someone says she should go, but even in the first Album (Morbus Gravis) - she clearly does anything she has to do in order to stay alive or help her loved one (even performing or being subjected to unwanted sexual acts), and she is also cunning (she lures her attackers to their ultimate demise) and a good soul that does not want to see anyone die (even if that person tried to harm her) and goes to great lengths to carry out her loved one's last request. In Carnivora, Druuna shows how well she can keep her cool under extreme pressure, and how resourceful she is, by learning, instantly, how to operate and aim a flame thrower (something that she apparently has never seen before), saving a stranger. She is extremely intelligent and quickly grasps the paradoxes of time traveling through different universes. She's also strong willed- she keeps going, even after being fatally wounded.

In the prequel stories (the "Druuna- Au commencement" story arc, not penned by Serpieri) she is somewhat different, still being the target of multiple unwanted sexual acts, but trying to offer resistance (as most people would) or being subdued because of threats. It seems implied that Druuna's personality was molded because of everything that happened to her, almost like she realized that (probably because of her looks) she would always be the target of the same kind of sexual violence and learned to make the best of it, using that as a tool for her survival, even openly exchanging sex for the drugs she needed.

She seems to have learned to deal with the stress of being the victim of sexual violence by overcompensating and trying to have sex with people she loves, repressing what would be a normal "shock response".

Across most of her adventures, Druuna seems to have multiple views about sex: it's something she enjoys doing with her loved one(s); it's something she has to perform or be subjected to, in order to achieve her goals; it's often something that she just loves doing, for the simple pleasure of it.

In the album Druuna X, Serpieri states that he styled Druuna as influenced by Valérie Kaprisky's appearance in the film La Femme publique, but because of the influence of the copious Western comics he had drawn at that point, in the first few pages of Morbus Gravis Druuna appeared to exhibit Native American facial features, compared to the later appearance to which she evolved.

== List of appearances ==
- Graphic novels
  - Morbus Gravis (Dargaud, 1985) ISBN 3-933187-69-9 - reprinted in Heavy Metal Magazine Vol. 10, #2 Summer 1986
  - Morbus Gravis, Part 2 (Dargaud, 1987) ISBN 2-908406-63-2 - reprinted in Heavy Metal Magazine Vol. 12, #1 Spring 1988
  - Creatura (Bagheera, 1990) ISBN 3-933187-71-0 - reprinted in Heavy Metal Magazine Vol. 16, #4 (magazine lists it as Vol. 17, #4) Nov. 1992
  - Carnivora (Bagheera, 1992) ISBN 3-933187-72-9 - reprinted in Heavy Metal: Software Special Edition Vol. 7, #2, 1993.
  - Mandragora (Bagheera, 1995) ISBN 2-908406-32-2 - reprinted in Heavy Metal Magazine Vol. 19, #4 Sept. 1995
  - Aphrodisia (Bagheera, 1997) ISBN 2-908406-69-1 - reprinted in Heavy Metal Magazine Vol. 21, #4 Sept. 1997
  - La Planète oubliée (The Forgotten Planet) (Bagheera, 2000) ISBN 2-908406-60-8 - reprinted in Heavy Metal Magazine Vol. 25, #2 May 2001
  - Clone (Bagheera, 2003) ISBN 2-908406-72-1 - reprinted in Heavy Metal Magazine Vol. 27, #5 Nov. 2003
  - Anima: Les Origines (Glénat BD, 2016) ISBN 2344013539
  - Venuta Dal Vento (Came From The Wind) (Lo Scarabeo, 2018) ISBN 978-88-6527-564-1
  - Druuna – Au commencement: Espoirs (2022)
  - Druuna - Au commencement: Genesis (2023)
  - Druuna - Au commencement: Diabolicus Morbus (2026)
- Serpieri sketchbooks
  - Serpieri Obsession: In Search of Druuna (Heavy Metal Magazine, 1993) ISBN 978-1-882931-23-1
  - Druuna X (Heavy Metal, Dec. 1993) ISBN 978-1-882931-03-3
  - Druuna X 2 (Heavy Metal, 1998) ISBN 1-882931-41-6
  - Serpieri: The Sweet Smell of Woman (Heavy Metal Magazine, 2000) ISBN 1-882931-60-2
  - Croquis (Serpieri Sketchbook)(Bagheera, 2001) ISBN 2-908406-36-5 - reprinted in Heavy Metal Magazine, 2001. ISBN 1-882931-14-9
  - Serpieri Sketchbook 2 (Heavy Metal, 2002) ISBN 1-882931-90-4

== In other media ==
The character has also appeared in the critically and commercially panned videogame tie-in Druuna: Morbus Gravis.

== Bibliography ==
- Ralf Georg Czapla, "Morbus Gravis (Druuna)". In: Lexikon der Comics. Werke, Personen, Themen, Aspekte. Loseblattausgabe. Begründet von Heiko Langhans, fortgeführt von Marcus Czerwionka. Corian Verlag, Meitingen. 33. Ergänzungslieferung März 2000 (in German).
