= Il Piccolo Sceriffo =

Italian comic book series

Publication information
- Genre: Western
- Publication date: 1948-1966

Il Piccolo Sceriffo (i.e. "The Little Sheriff") was an Italian comic book series created by writer Tristano Torelli with illustrator Camillo Zuffi and later developed by numerous authors. It originally ran from 1948 until 1966.

== History and profile ==
A western series featuring a teenage hero, it debuted on June 10, 1948 and got an immediate success. In 1951 Gianna Arguissola replaced Torelli as writer. Each issue was a self-contained episode of an unfolding story which recounted the adventures of the young orphan Kit Hodgkin, who after having captured the murderers of his sheriff father is acclaimed new sheriff.

In 1959, inspired by the success of Intrepido, the publication adopted a similar pocket format, changed its name in Il Nuovo Sceriffo ("The New Sheriff") and became a proper comic magazine presenting several additional adventure series, while the main series was renamed Kid lo sceriffo ("Kid The Sheriff"). In 1962 the magazine changed its name in Il Nuovo Sceriffo presenta Radar, and in 1963 it eventually split in two magazines, Radar and Sceriffo Gigante, with only the latter continuing to publish Piccolo Sceriffo series.

== Legacy ==
During the years the comic book series was republished several times under different titles, including Albo dello Sceriffo, Raccolta del Piccolo Sceriffo, Racconti dello Sceriffo and Sceriffo Kit.

The comic book series inspired two novels, Il Piccolo Sceriffo (1951) and Artiglio nero (1952), written by Tristano Torelli and Gianna Arguissola, with illustrations by Ferdinando Tacconi, and an erotic photonovel series, published in the magazine Caballero in 1972. The comic was also adapted in a 1950 medium-length film with the same name, directed by Vittorio Sala and presented at the 11th edition of the Venice Film Festival.

== See also ==
Other comics series created by Tristano Torelli:

- Carnera (1947–1950)
- Sciuscià (1949–1956)
