= Tony Falco =

- Cover of the first issue, 11 December 1948

Publication information
- Publisher: Editoriale per Ragazzi
- Genre: Action/adventure
- Publication date: December 1948 – November 1949
- No. of issues: 48

Creative team
- Written by: Andrea Lavezzolo
- Artist: Andrea Bresciani

Tony Falco was an Italian comic book series created and written by Andrea Lavezzolo with illustrations by Andrea Bresciani. It was published weekly in 48 issues from 1948 to 1949.

== Background ==
Tony Falco was the second major comic character created by Lavezzolo, and was reputedly his favourite. Each issue was a self-contained episode of an unfolding story which recounted the adventures of Tony Falco, an Italian engineer working in Egypt. The first issue, published on 11 December 1948, was entitled I misteri della Casbah (The Mysteries of the Kasbah). The last issue, published on 5 November 1949 was entitled Il rogo sul mare (The Burning Sea). The entire series was republished in facsimile in 1975 by the Associazione Nazionale Amici del Fumetto.

== See also ==
Other comics series created by Andrea Lavezzolo:

- Gim Toro (1946–1951)
- Geky Dor (1949–1950)
- Kinowa (1950–1961)
- Il Piccolo Ranger (1958–1985)
