= Giuseppe Camino =

Italian painter (1818–1890)

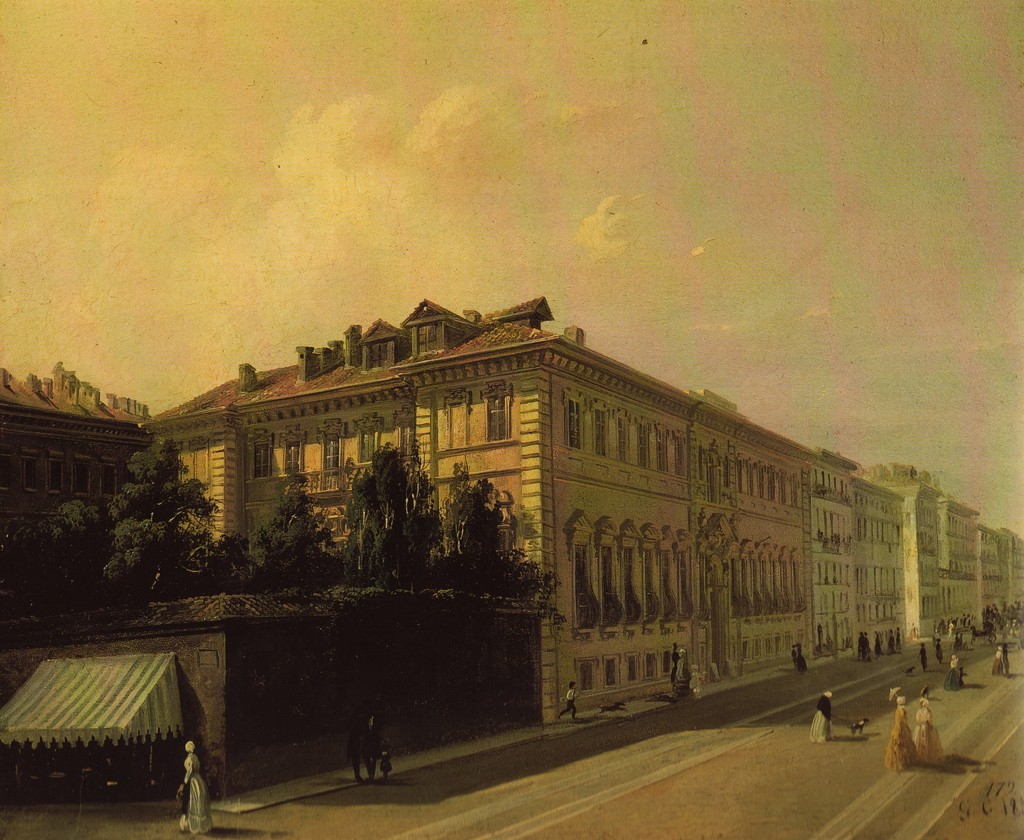
The Palazzo d'Azeglio in Turin

Giuseppe Camino (1818 – 1890) was an Italian painter, mainly of landscapes and vedute.

== Biography ==
As a young man he painted an altarpiece for the church of Rocciamelone depicting St Vincent of Paoli and a Via Crucis for the Convent of the Visitation in Turin. He trained under Giuseppe Bogliani and Angelo Beccaria. He worked on scenography for the Teatro Regio of Turin. He painted landscapes of the Roman Campagna (circa 1845), views of Paris and London (1851), and many alpine landscapes of this native Piedmont. Many of his works are exhibited at the Ducal Castle of Agliè.
