= Frigidaire (magazine) =

Italian comics magazine (1980–2008)

- Categories: Comics magazine
- First issue: November 1980
- Final issue: December 2008
- Country: Italy
- Based in: Rome
- Language: Italian
- Website: Frigidaire

Frigidaire was a comics magazine published in Rome, Italy. The magazine had significant effects on graphic design, illustrations and written speech in the country during the 1980s. In 2008 it folded, and in 2009 it became a supplement of Liberazione, a now defunct communist newspaper.

== History and profile ==
Frigidaire was established in 1980. The first issue appeared in November. The founders were Vincenzo Sparagna, Stefano Tamburini, Filippo Scòzzari, Andrea Pazienza, Massimo Mattioli, and Tanino Liberatore. The magazine had its headquarters in Rome.

In addition to cartoons Frigidaire featured avant-garde reportages and interviews and covers articles on visual art. It also included investigative reports. Over time the magazine became a mouthpiece for left-wing counterculture in the country.

At the beginning of the 2000s the frequency of Frigidaire was switched to bi-monthly. In 2003 Vincenzo Sparagna sold the publisher of the magazine, which was temporarily ceased publication from April–May 2003 to 2006.

In 2005, Sparagna moved the magazine's headquarters from Rome to a rural area near Giano dell'Umbria. The estate, dubbed the 'Republic of Frigolandia', housed the magazine's museum. The estate acted like a micro-country, and was established with a constitution that values inclusion.

On 25 April 2009, the magazine began to be published as an insert of Liberazione, a communist daily.

In September 2002, the covers and some selected pages of the magazine were exhibited at the 7th Athens International Comics Festival. Frigidaire's archives are housed at Yale's Beinecke Rare Book & Manuscript Library.

In 2020, a local right-wing party attempted to evict Sparagna from the Republic of Frigolandia, threatening the museum and its archives.

== See also ==
- List of avant-garde magazines
- List of magazines in Italy
