= Captain Miki =

Italian comic book created by EsseGesse

Capitan Miki

Publication information
- Genre: Western
- Publication date: 1951–1967
- Main character(s): Capitan Miki, Salasso, Doppio Rhum

Creative team
- Created by: EsseGesse

Capitan Miki (translation: Captain Miki) is an Italian comic book, created by the trio EsseGesse. The series was first published in Italy on 1 July 1951. It gained a great commercial success, selling over 500,000 copies per week and launching the careers of its three authors.

== Plot ==
Miki is a young boy who, after carrying out a number of successful missions is promoted, in spite of his young age, to the rank of captain of rangers in Nevada. Miki has a young fiancée, Susy, the daughter of the fort commandant. His best friends are Doppio Rhum (Double Rum) and Dottor Salasso (Doctor bloodletting). Doppio Rhum was inspired by the actor Gabby Hayes in many western films of the 1930s and 1940s, and Dottor Salasso by the drunken Doc, portrayed by Thomas Mitchell in the classic western film Stagecoach (1939).
