= Carlo Piacenza =

Italian painter (1814–1887)

Carlo Piacenza (December 3, 1814 in Turin – 1887) was an Italian painter, mainly of Genre landscape scenes of the Piedmont.

At the age of 20 years abandons his father's business, and becomes a pupil at the Accademia Albertina under Giovanni Battista Biscarra. He then apprentices with Pietro Fea. In 1840 he exits the academy. When Ernesto Allason became ill, he substituted for some time as tutor to the Savoyard princess in Turin. Among his works are:

- Morning in autumn
- Veduta presso Giaveno
- Return of the Hunters
- Veduta Valle d'Aosta
- Lanterna di Genova
- La tranquillita campestre
- Riposo di contadini
- Mattino a Gressoney
- Veduta di Locana
- Veduta di Pont
- Studie dal vero
- Valle di Fenestrelle
- Dejeuner in Campanga
- Nebbia
- Effeto di pioggia San Maurizio
- Raccolte dei funghi
- Il guado
- Boscaglie
- Il sangone
- In val di Stura
- Forest d'abeti
- Valle dell'Orco 1884
