= Comandante Mark =

Publication information
- First appearance: 1966
- Created by: EsseGesse

In-story information
- Partnerships: Sad Owl, Mister Bluff

Comandante Mark is an Italian comic book originally published in Italy by Daimi Press (future Sergio Bonelli Editore). The original series was published in Italy monthly between September 1966 and January 1990, reached 281 numbers (mostly episodes on 64 black and white pages). Between 1990 and 2000, there were published 11 numbers of Mark Special, of 128 or 160 pages each.

Comandante Mark was created, written and illustrated by the trio EsseGesse. It chronicled the adventurous exploits of the eponymous Commander Mark (an orphan raised by Ontario natives after a shipwreck) fighting against English 'redcoats' between 1773 and 1781. Aiding him in his struggle are several colorful companions like the native Sad Owl, Mister Bluff (a former corsair and avuncular figure for Mark) and Bluff's faithful dog, Flok, 'El Gancho', and Betty (Mark's fiancée) .

== Plot ==
Against the background of the American Revolutionary War, Comandante Mark is presented to the readers as a handsome, brave, sturdy and invincible young man, who nonetheless does not convey any trace of the aloofness that is often generated by a protagonist's sense of superiority over the surrounding world. Mark has just the right degree of self-confidence as a hero and he radiates a warm feeling of confidence; he has accumulated excellent experience in his field (pitched battles and uncompromising warfare against the soldiers of George III) and he uses his vast knowledge on every occasion and always succeeds. He moves together with the Ontario Wolves, a group of indomitable guerrilla fighters, composed of men and women from many different places, of all ages and from all social classes, people with different histories and past lives who have joined together.
