= Andrea Lavezzolo =

- Caricature of Lavezzolo by Renzo Sciutto
- Born: 12 December 1905; Paris, France
- Died: 16 November 1981 (aged 75); Chiavari, Italy
- Occupations: Comic book writer, novelist

Andrea Lavezzolo (12 December 1905 – 16 November 1981) was an Italian novelist and short story writer who created and wrote many prominent Italian comics of the 1940s and 1950s.

== Life and career ==
Lavezzolo was born in Paris to Italian parents. The family returned to Italy when he was eight years old and settled in Chiavari near Genoa. Having left school early to help support his family, he worked in a variety of jobs in his youth, including as an employee of an insurance company, but at the same time began writing short stories and poems for various Italian magazines. He also wrote short novels such L'idolo cinese published by Sonzogno in 1936, and children's books published by Carroccio such as Il mantello magico in 1934 and Le tre Pepite in 1939. Lavezzolo started writing for the weekly comics magazine Albogiornale Juventus with "La città delle tenebre" in 1939 and in the early 1940s worked on the scenarios and text for the comic book series Dick Fulmine. He went on to create a series of comic books and characters which included Gim Toro in 1946 (his first major success), Tony Falco in 1948, Geky Dor in 1949, Kinowa in 1950 and Il Piccolo Ranger in 1958.

In the mid-1950s Lavezzolo began working for the newspaper Il Giorno on the recommendation of Cino Del Duca having previously worked on Del Duca's magazines Il Monello and Intrepido, both of which were aimed at children and teenagers. In 1957 he became the editor of the paper's weekly young people's supplement Il Giorno dei Ragazzi and remained in that post until 1966. In his later years he wrote essays and articles on Italian comics for the magazines Sergeant Kirk and Il Fumetto and in 1975 was made Honorary President of the Associazione Nazionale Amici del Fumetto.

Lavezzolo died in Chiavari in 1981 at the age of 75. His obituary in Il Secolo XIX was written by Lavezzolo himself when he was already gravely ill. It began:

Due to unavoidable commitments, but without much regret, the writer Andrea Lavezzolo says goodbye to family, relatives, friends and readers. (Note: Original Italian: "Per improrogabili impegni, ma senza eccessivo rimpianto, lo scrittore Andrea Lavezzolo si congeda da famiglia, parenti, amici e lettori".)

A street in Rome is named in his honour—Via Andrea Lavezzolo in the Torrino Mezzocammino quarter. One of the city's newest areas (building began in 2005), Torrino Mezzocammino has streets, piazzas and even schools named for the characters, writers, and artists of Italian comics.
