= Marvel 2099: One Nation Under Doom =

Cancelled PlayStation video game

Marvel 2099: One Nation Under Doom was a cancelled game for the PlayStation developed by Mindscape Inc. It was to be loosely based on the "One Nation Under Doom" storyline in Marvel's Doom 2099 comic. It was envisioned as a 2D side-scroller with 3D rendered characters.

In February 1996, Mindscape announced they would produce a video game based on the Marvel 2099 universe. Promoted as one of their top five games for the year, the game would be released on December 1, 1996, just in time for the Christmas rush. Two versions were announced: PlayStation and Windows 95.

By May 1996, CD-ROM and VHS video demos were being shipped to game magazines for pre-release reviews, along with a one-page color brochure. The first public demo was shown at the E3 show, and featured a playable single level of the Punisher 2099 fighting SHIELD troops, and also opening menus and some cut scenes. Electronic Gaming Monthly had a quarter-page preview of the game in their July 1996 issue and a half page preview in their August 1996 issue, showing screenshots of actual gameplay with Punisher 2099, and claiming that Spider-Man 2099, X-Men 2099, Ghost Rider 2099, Fantastic Four 2099, and Hulk 2099 would all be player characters as well, and in addition 40 other characters from the comic books would appear as non-player characters. At the 1996 San Diego Comic-Con, the Mindscape booth handed out brochures, and raffled off One Nation Under Doom pins, shirts, and posters. Some attendees were even allowed to play the demo at the booth, although no copies of the demo were distributed. September 1996 issue of 3D Design magazine had a cover story on the Marvel 2099 game. Following a round of layoffs of development staff in November 1996, Mindscape maintained that the game was still in the works. After July, due to financial troubles, ongoing production of the game slowed down, and eventually stopped, though the game was never officially cancelled.
