= 1993 in comics =

Notable events of 1993 in comics.

== Events ==
=== January ===
- January 11 Raider of the Copper Hill by Don Rosa.
- January 24 – March 18: Hanco Kolk and Peter de Wit host a TV documentary series about cartooning on Teleac, which will often been repeated in the years that follow.
- Doom Patrol #63: "The Empire of Chairs," Grant Morrison's final issue as Doom Patrol writer.
- First appearance of Ghost Rider 2099 – The Punisher War Journal # 50 Jan 1993
- Asterix and the Class Act, by René Goscinny and Albert Uderzo.
- In the first issue of Dylan Dog gigante, Totentanz, by Tiziano Sclavi and Giampiero Casertano.
- Beginning of Il segreto del Morisco (The Morisco's secret), the longest Tex Willer story, lasting 6 albums and 586 tables, and strongly influenced by the archaeologic adventures of Indiana Jones and Martin Mystere.

=== February ===
- Action Comics, with issue #686, suspends publication following "The Death of Superman." (DC Comics)
- Clive Barker's Hellraiser is canceled by Epic Comics (Marvel) with issue #20.
- Hardware #1 (cover-dated April) debuts under Milestone brand. Created by Dwayne McDuffie and Denys Cowan, Hardware is the first character and book published by Milestone to debut.
- First issue of Palestine by Joe Sacco (Phantagraphic Books).
- In the magazine Sturmtruppen, fist strip of L'ultima burba (The last newbies) by Leo Ortolani; the series ironizes about the author's experiences as conscript.

=== March ===
- March 7: The final episode of the daily comic series Flash Gordon is published. The Sunday comics will continue until 2003.
- March 15: The New Laird of Castle McDuck by Don Rosa.
- March 27: The first edition of the Fantasy Anime Comics Toys Space, aka F.A.C.T.S. festival is organized in Ghent, Belgium.
- DC Comics debuts its new Vertigo imprint with the publication of Death: The High Cost of Living #1. Existing DC titles Swamp Thing #129, Hellblazer #63, Sandman #47, Doom Patrol #64, Animal Man #57, and Shade, the Changing Man #33 all become Vertigo titles as well.
- Hawkworld canceled by DC with issue #32.
- Introduction of the hero X in Dark Horse Comics #8. (Dark Horse Comics)
- Introduction of Deathblow in Darker Image #1 and Stormwatch in Stormwatch #1. (Image Comics)
- I killer venuti dal buio (The killers from the dark) by Claudio Chiaverotti and Luigi Siniscalchi, with Dylan Dog.

=== April ===
- April 1: News is spread that archeologists have found the ancient ruins of Astérix' village. This later turns out to be an April fools' joke.
- Adventures of Superman #500 (dated "Early June") is released and the Reign of the Supermen! begins with four Supermen.
- The Martin Mystere's arc called "Italian mysteries" begins with the album Nea Heliopolis, by Alfredo Castelli and Giancarlo Alessandrini; the hero leaves temporarily New York and, for two years, settles in Florence.

=== May ===
- May 3: The Terror of the Transvaal, by Don Rosa.
- Cable is released by Marvel Comics as a monthly title.
- Peter Parker, Spectacular Spider-Man #200: "Best of Enemies!" by J.M. DeMatteis and Sal Buscema. (Marvel Comics)
- Web of Spider-Man #100 by Terry Kavanagh, Alex Saviuk and Joe Rubinstein. (Marvel Comics)
- Nick Fury, Agent of S.H.I.E.L.D. is canceled by Marvel with issue #47.
- The Tick vol. 1 is canceled by New England Comics with issue #12.
- Marvel's "Maximum Carnage" Spider-Man storyline begins.
- The first edition of Scott McCloud's book Understanding Comics is published by Tundra Publishing. The book went on to win 1994 Harvey Awards for Best Writer; Best Graphic Album of Original Work; and Best Biographical, Historical, or Journalistic Presentation. It also won the 1994 Eisner Award for Best Comics-Related Book.
- Le maître dell'illusion (The master of illusion) by André-Paul Duchâteau and Tibet.
- The first official issue of Sonic the Hedgehog by Archie Comics is released.

=== June ===
- June 14: The Dreamtime Duck of the Never Never by Don Rosa.
- June 29: Cancellation of the Belgian comics magazine Tintin, after nearly half a century of publication.
- Adventures of Superman #500 by Jerry Ordway, Tom Grummett and Doug Hazlewood.
- Action Comics, with issue #687, resumes publication after a four-month hiatus following "The Death of Superman" and "Funeral for a Friend" storylines.
- With issue #51, Justice League Europe changes its name to Justice League International vol. 2. (DC Comics)
- Malibu Comics launches the Ultraverse line of comics in which it states that "Writers are the true enhancements in comics" (a pointed reference to the trend of publishing and marketing foil-stamped covers). Said writers include Steve Englehart, Gerard Jones, and Steve Gerber. Variant editions of the first issues are published with hologram covers.
- The conclusion to Marvel Comics' "Infinity Trilogy" is launched with Infinity Crusade.
- The first episode of Daniel Clowes' Ghost World is prepublished in Eightball.
- in Italy, first issue of Minni & company, Disney magazine aimed to the female public.
- Johnny Freak by Tiziano Sclavi and Andrea Venturi, one of the most moving and beloved Dylan Dog's stories.
- Two Blueberry's albums appear simultaneously: Mission Sherman, by Jean Giraud and William Vance, second chapter of the arc Marshall Blueberry, and Trois hommes pour Atlanta (Three men for Atlanta) by Francois Corteggiani and Colin Wilson, first part of a diptych where a young Blueberry takes part to the battle of Atlanta.

=== July ===
- July 12: In Spirou, first chapter of the final La Patrouille des Castors story La Pierre de foudre by Mitacq is published.
- July 19: The Argonaut Of White Agony Creek by Don Rosa.
- July 29 : Sonic The Comic launched.
- in Uncle Scrooge Adventures, Guardians of the Lost Library, by Don Rosa.
- Premiere issue of Hero Illustrated.
- The start of the "Summer Offensive" in 2000 AD when control was handed over to Grant Morrison and Mark Millar. With issue #842 the magazine launches a raft of new features, including Really & Truly, Slaughterbowl, Big Dave, and Maniac 5 as well as Morrison's run on Judge Dredd with "Inferno."
- DC Comics releases Batman #500, in which Azrael becomes the new Batman.
- Image Comics and Valiant Comics stage an intercompany crossover called Deathmate.
- Fatal Attractions begins.
- Fuga da Skynet (Escape from Skynet), by Guido Nolitta, Alfredo Castelli, Stefano and Domenico Di Vitto and Roberto Diso; only team-up of Martin Mystere and Mister No.
- Sergio Bonelli inaugurates officially the Almanacs series, with the Crime Almanac 1993 (with Nick Raider) and the Science-fiction Almanac 1993 (with Nathan Never); however, the formula (a story with a Bonelli hero, matched with reviews and in-depth articles) had been already experimented since 1987, with the Mystery Almanacs (with Martin Mystere).
- Doppia identità (Double identity) by Ade Capone and Giancarlo Olivares; first issue of the Lazarus Leed's regular series.
- Last issue of the Italian magazine Corto Maltese; it contains the short watercolor story Corto a Cordoba, last appearance of the Hugo Pratt's seaman.

=== August ===
- 2000 AD's "Summer Offensive" draws to a close with issue #849.
- The New Titans #100: "The Darkening, Part Four: Something Old, Something New, Something Borrowed, Something... Dead," by Marv Wolfman, Tom Grummett, and Bill Jaaska.
- Deadpool #1 is released by Marvel Comics
- "The Fall from Grace" storyline debuts in Daredevil #319.
- Comic book radio show " 'Nuff Said! " debuts on WBAI-FM, New York City, on the 28th as part of Jim Freund's "Hour of the Wolf" science fiction program.
- First issue of the Italian Disney magazine Paperinik.

=== September ===
- The 'Nam is canceled by Marvel with issue #84.
- September 15: First issue of the Flemish comics magazine Suske en Wiske Weekblad.
- September 24: First page of Doctor Fun is uploaded on the World Wide Web.

=== October ===
- October 3: In Gisteren Zondag, a newspaper made to promote the TV talk show Morgen Maandag by Mark Uytterhoeven, Fritz Van den Heuvel's gag comic Luchien is published. It will run until the final episode of the TV show, on 26 December, which also means the end of Gisteren Zondag.
- October 14: The theme park built around the comic strip Li'l Abner, Dogpatch USA, closes down.
- October 16–17: During the Stripdagen in Breda Kamagurka receives the Stripschapprijs. The Jaarprijs voor Bijzondere Verdiensten (nowadays P. Hans Frankfurtherprijs) is awarded to colorist Wilma Leenders.
- Batman #500: 64-page giant—"Knightfall" chapter 19, written by Doug Moench.
- Green Lantern takes part in the Reign of the Supermen in issue #46
- Mike Carlin and Dan Jurgens relaunch the Metal Men with a four-issue limited series
- Reed Richards aka Mr. Fantastic "dies" in Fantastic Four #381
- Stephen Platt debuts on Moon Knight #55 and becomes extremely popular due to his art style resembling Todd McFarlane.
- X-Men 2099 #1 – Marvel 2099
- The first full colour issue of The Beano, it was issue 2674 dated October 16, 1993.
- Business blues, by Jean Van Hamme and Philippe Francq.
- La source et la sonde, by Francois Bourgeon and Claude Lacroix, first album of the Cyann cycle.

=== November ===
- November 11: The Billionaire of Dismal Downs, by Don Rosa.
- November 12: in Gazzetta di Parma, first strip of the series Quelli di Parma (The Parma ones) by Leo Ortolani.
- Green Lantern #47 marks the reunion of Green Lantern and Green Arrow.
- Avengers West Coast #100: 64-page anniversary issue; the death of Mockingbird.
- Wolverine #75 represents a turning point in Wolverine's life as the adamantium is separated from his body by Magneto.
- Marvel's X-Men "Fatal Attractions" X-Men storyline concludes, only for "Bloodties" to begin.
- La forteresse invisible (The invisible fortress) – by Jean Van Hamme and Grzegorz Rosiński, nineteenth Thorgal's album.
- At Lucca Comics, the number zero of Arthur King, parodic sci-fi series by Lorenzo Bartoli and Andrea Domestici, is presented.

=== December ===
- Conan the Barbarian is canceled with issue #275
- The Punisher (Marvel Comics) debuts the "Suicide Run" storyline with issue #85
- "Emerald Twilight" storyline debuts in Green Lantern #48
- Hellboy makes his first mainstream comic book appearance, in Next Men #21.
- Lobo gets a monthly title from DC Comics
- Malibu Ultraverse launches "Break-Thru," the first company-wide crossover.
- Last issue of Tiramolla; after forty years, the character leaves definitively the scene.

=== Specific date unknown ===
- A tumultuous year in publishing: Topps Comics, Claypool Comics, Alternative Comics, Bongo Comics, Hall of Heroes, Lightning Comics, Azteca Productions, ANIA Publishing, Dagger Enterprises, Majestic Entertainment, Triumphant Comics, and Michael Hunt Publishing all enter the marketplace; while First Comics, Eclipse Comics, Disney Comics, Vortex Comics, Innovation Comics, Personality Comics, and Comic Chronicles all cease publishing.
- DC Comics introduces its Vertigo, Paradox Press, and Milestone Media imprints.
- Early webcomics start to appear on the World Wide Web, effectively starting the history of webcomics.
- Rip Off Press publishes Savage Henry #30, the final issue of volume one of that series.
- Ted Hearn's Fuzz & Pluck debuts, which will run until 2017.
- Jan Bucquoy is sued by Morris' estate for making a pornographic parody comic of Lucky Luke.
- In the Italian magazine Cyborg, AWOP-BOP-ALOOBOP ALOP-BAM-BOOM, by Massimo Mattioli, demented adventures of a cat whose girlfriend has been abducted by the Aliens.
- Amanda, by Robin Wood and Alfredo Falugi, for Editorial Columbia; serial, inspired by the Nineteenth Century feuilletons, about the adventures of an orphan girl.
- Spaghetti Bros, by Carlos Trillo and Domingo Mandrafina, saga of five Italo-American brothers in the roaring Twenties.
- Jean-Pol, Wim Swerts and Luc Van Asten develop a celebrity comic strip based on the popular children's TV show Samson en Gert. It will run until 2005.
- Little Archie #10, comeback reprints of the original Little Archie.
- Dutch cartoonist Gummbah makes his debut.

== Deaths ==
=== January ===
- January 17: F. O. Alexander, American cartoonist, comics artist (Finney of the Force The Featherheads, continued Hairbreadth Harry) and key contributor to the design of the board game Monopoly, dies at age 95.
- January 28:
  - Nelson Dias, Portuguese comics artist (Wanya, Escala em Orongo), dies at age 52.
  - Frans Funke Küpper, Dutch comics artist (Thijs Slof), dies at age 84.
  - Jerry Mills, American comic artist (Poppers), dies at age 31.

=== February ===
- February 7: Nic Broca, Belgian animator and comics artist (Ovide and the Gang, The Snorks, continued Spirou et Fantasio), dies at age 60.
- February 9: Jacques Verbeek, Dutch animator and comics artist (De Zippers, Alfred), dies at age 46.
- February 16: Mal Hancock, American cartoonist and comics artist (Nibbles, Patrick, The Fantastic Foster Fenwick, The Lumpits, Polly, Pig Newton, Malfunction Junction), dies at age 56.
- February 21: Harvey Kurtzman, American comics artist, writer and publisher (Mad, Two-Fisted Tales, Frontline Combat, Trump, Humbug, Harvey Kurtzman's Jungle Book, Help!, Little Annie Fanny), dies at age 68.

=== March ===
- March 3: Bill Draut, American comics artist and animator (Harvey Comics, DC Comics, co-creator of Bee-Man), dies at age 71.
- March 6: Norman Mansbridge, British comics artist (Fuss Pot), dies at age 82.
- March 19: Al McWilliams, A.K.A. Alden McWilliams, American comic artist (1940s crime comics, Twin Earths, assisted on Rip Kirby, comic strip adaptations of Star Trek, Dateline: Danger!, continued Buck Rogers in the 25th Century, Dan Flagg, Mary Perkins, On Stage, Secret Agent X-9), dies at age 77.
- March 31: Manuel Gonzales, Spanish-American animator and comics artist (continued Mickey Mouse, Disney comics, creator of Ellsworth the mynah bird), dies at age 80.
- Specific date unknown: Frank Humphris, British comics artist (Riders of the Range, a comic adaptation of the radio serial Riders of the Range, The Devil's Henchmen, Gun Lore, continued Blackbow the Cheyenne), dies at age 82.

=== April ===
- April 15:
  - Leslie Charteris, British novelist and comics writer (Secret Agent X-9), dies at age 85.
  - Alberto Giolitti, Italian-American comics artist (worked on Star Trek comics, Tex Willer) and founder of the Giolitti Studios, dies in Rome at age 69.
- April 20: Charles Degotte, Belgian comics artist (Flagada, Les Motards), commits suicide at the age of 59.
- April 23: Bertus Aafjes, Dutch novelist, poet and comics writer (Mannetje Bagatel and Kleine Isar, de Vierde Koning with Eppo Doeve, as well as Peter-kersen-eter (1943) and De Vrolijke Vaderlandse Geschiedenis (1948) with Piet Worm.), dies at age 78.

=== May ===
- May 10: Bill Ziegler, American comics artist (Annie Oakley, drew for Dell Comics, worked on the comic strip based on Dragnet, worked on Mary Worth), dies at age 67.
- May 14: Gerda Gattel, American comics letterer and proofreader (DC Comics), dies at age 84.
- May 30: Lyman Anderson, American illustrator and cartoonist (Inspector Wade), dies at age 86.
- May 30: Marge, American comics artist (Little Lulu), dies at age 88.
- Specific date unknown: Renaud Mader, aka Mad, French comics artist and animator, is found dead at age 26 in a hotel room.

=== June ===
- June 6: Albert Micale, American illustrator and comics artist (worked on Roy Rogers comics, Boots and Saddles, Tex Ritter), dies at age 79.
- June 14: V.T. Hamlin, American comics artist (Alley Oop), dies at age 93.
- June 18: Claude Pascal, French comics artist (continued L'Oncle Paul, Buck Danny), dies at age 72.
- June 25: Arturo Moreno, Spanish comics artist and animator (worked for Pulgarcito), dies at age 84.
- June 30: Ronald Herman Poelmeijer, Dutch Tibetologist (wrote the essay Is Kuifje naar Tibet geweest? (Has Tintin Been To Tibet) about the accuracy of Tintin in Tibet), dies at age 46.

=== July ===
- July 12: Tibor Cs. Horváth, Hungarian comics writer and artist ( Roberto és Julika kalandjai), dies at age 67.
- July 20: George Wolfe, American comics artist (Pops, Citizen George), dies at age 82.
- July 22: Ivá, Spanish comics artist (Makinavaja, el último chorizo, La Puta Mili), dies at age 52.
- July 28: Jacques Laudy, Belgian comics artist (Hassan & Kadour, worked for Tintin) and painter, dies at age 86.
- Specific date unknown: Al Bryant, American comics artist (worked on Gale Allen and Shark Brodie), dies at age 76.

=== August ===
- August 7: Jørgen Clevin, Danish TV presenter and comics artist (Rasmus), dies at age 63.
- August 9: Bob Bugg, American comics artist (The New Neighbors, assisted on Dennis the Menace), dies at age 73.
- August 21: Arie Teeuwisse, Dutch sculptor, illustrator and comics artist (Kroosje), dies at age 74.

=== September ===
- September 1: Neon Park, American album cover designer, illustrator and comics artist (Chemical Wedding, made a comic strip-style design for the album covers of Frank Zappa's Weasels Ripped My Flesh and David Bowie's Images 1966-1967), dies from ALS at age 52.
- September 9: David Tendlar, American animator and comics artist (worked for Jingle Jangle Comics, Harvey Comics, Paramount Animated Comics), dies at age 84.
- September 26: Eduardo Vañó Pastor, Spanish comic artist (Milton, el Corsario, Roberto Alcázar y Pedrín), dies at age 82.
- September 27: Al Bryant, American comics artist (worked on Gale Allen, Shark Brodie and Doll Man), dies at age 76.

=== October ===
- October 3: Miguel Angèl Sayrach, Spanish painter and comics artist (Bibi i Tobi), dies at age 65.
- October 20: Gaylord DuBois, American comics writer (Tarzan, Red Ryder, The Lone Ranger), dies at age 94.
- October 28: Jacques Géron, Belgian comics artist (continued Yalek), dies at age 43.
- October 31: Federico Fellini, Italian film director and occasional comics artist and writer (Giacomino, Cico e Pallina, Geppi La Bimba Atomica, Viaggio a Tulun, Il Viaggio di G. Mastorna), dies of a stroke at age 73.

=== November ===
- November 9: Ross Andru, American comics artist and editor (co-creator of Sgt. Rock, worked on The Amazing Spider-Man, The Flash, Metal Men, Superman vs. the Amazing Spider-Man, Wonder Woman), dies at age 66.
- November 10: Alberto Breccia, Uruguayan-Argentine comics artist (Mort Cinder, Ernie Pike, El Eternauta, Evita, vida y obra de Eva Perón, Martin Fierro), dies at age 74.
- November 11: John Stanley, American comics writer (Little Lulu), dies at age 79.
- November 12: Bill Ely, American comics artist (drew various adventure and mystery comics for National Comics Publications), dies at age 80.
- November 24: Dick Wingert, American comics artist (Hubert), dies at age 74.

=== December ===
- December 3: Nelly Donker, Dutch children's book illustrator and comics artist (Tommie Lukkie, Puckie Peen), dies at age 79.
- December 4: Frank Zappa, American rock musician, composer and comics writer (wrote the script for a 1977 comic strip by Kamagurka ), dies at age 52.
- December 7: Wim Lensen, Dutch comics artist and colorist (Sim en Pans, worked for Marten Toonder's studio), dies at age 79.
- December 10: Roland Davies, British comics artist, animator and painter (Come On, Steve, Sparks and Flash, Roddy the Road Scout, Jill Crusoë, continued Sexton Blake and Teddy Tail), dies at age 89.
- December 12: Franz-Werner Richter-Johnsen, German painter, graphic artist and comics artist (Detektiv Schmidtchen, Taró), dies at age 81.
- December 21: Zack Mosley, American comics artist (The Adventures of Smilin' Jack), dies at age 87.
- December 27: Howard Sherman, American comics artist (Tommy Tomorrow), dies at age 84.

=== Specific date unknown ===
- Andrea Da Passano, aka DaP, aka Endré, Russian-American comics artist and illustrator (made Laurel & Hardy comics), dies at age 87 or 88.
- André Jacquemotte, Belgian editorial cartoonist (made a 1951 comic strip about assassinated politician Julien Lahaut), dies at age 67 or 68.
- Ennio Missaglia, Italian comics writer (wrote for his brother Vladimiro Missaglia), dies at age 62 or 63.

== Exhibitions ==
- May 18 – August 8: "War No More", featuring the artwork of George Pratt, Bill Sienkiewicz, Jack Kirby, John Severin, and Frank Redondo (Words & Pictures Museum, Northampton, Massachusetts)
- October 8 – October 30: "Comic Power: Underground/Independent Comix U.S.A." (Exit Art/The First World, New York City) — curated by John Carlin and Carlo McCormick; later traveled to the Massachusetts College of Art (Jan. 20, 1994 to Feb. 20), the Vancouver Art Gallery (April 15 to June 15), and the Dunlop Art Gallery (July 7 to Sept. 18)

== Conventions ==
=== Europe ===
- April 24–25: GlasCAC (Glasgow City Halls, Glasgow, Scotland)—4th edition of the GlasCAC; presentation of the U.K. Comic Art Awards; guests include Colin MacNeil, Cam Kennedy, Dave Alexander, John Beeston, and Jim Shooter
- July 17–18: CAPTION93 (Oxford Union Society, Oxford, England)
- September 18–19: United Kingdom Comic Art Convention (London, England)—guests include Grant Morrison, Garth Ennis, Rian Hughes, Steve Yeowell, Jill Thompson, Matt Wagner, Alan Grant, and Carlos Ezquerra
- late October–early November: Lucca Comics (Lucca, Italy) — first iteration of what becomes Lucca Comics & Games, continuing the previous festival Salone Internazionale dei Comics, which was held in Lucca from 1966 to 1992 before moving to Rome as part of Expocartoon

=== North America ===
- January 17–18: International Association for Direct Distribution (New Orleans, Louisiana)
- January 23–24: Great Eastern Conventions I (Jacob K. Javits Convention Center, New York City)—guests include Wendy & Richard Pini, launching their Elfquest '93 tour.
- March 5–7 Dallas Fantasy Fair I (Dallas, Texas)—first presentation of the Harvey Awards since the death of awards' namesake Harvey Kurtzman; fund-raiser to help pay for the continuance of the award; official guests include Adam West, Donald Simpson, Larry Stroman, Tex Henson, Kerry Gammill, and Shannon Wheeler
- March 21: WaRP Graphics convention (Liverpool, New York)—organized by Wendy and Richard Pini to benefit the Make-A-Wish Foundation
- March 31 – April 1: ProCon (Oakland, California)—first professionals-only convention; held right before WonderCon
- April 2–4: WonderCon (Oakland, California)—7th edition of the convention
- April 3–4: Great Eastern Conventions II (New York City)
- May 3–4: Capital City Trade Show (Madison, Wisconsin)—guests included Dave Sim
- May 8: Ramapo Comic Con VIII (Ramapo High School, Spring Valley, New York)—guests include Julius Schwartz, José Luis García-López, Jerry Ordway, Frank McLaughlin, Luke McDonnell, Jim Salicrup, Mike Leeke, Evan Dorkin, Mark Chiarello, George Pratt, Lee Weeks, Bob McLeod, Dave Cockrum, Bob Pinaha, John Workman, Rick Parker, Jordan Raskin, Bob Wiacek, Ron Garney, Rachel Pollack, Ken Gale, Mercy Van Vlack, Kurt Schaffenberger, Anthony Tollin, Adrienne Roy, Joe Staton, Bernie Wrightson, Elaine Lee, Doug Moench, Bob Smith, Bob Layton, Michael Davis, Deni Loubert, Ray Lago, Eric Shanower, Kim DeMulder, Rick Bryant, Howard Bender, and M. D. Bright
- May 16–18: Heroes World Trade Show (Randolph, New Jersey)—guests include Dave Sim
- June 11–13: Heroes Convention (Charlotte, North Carolina)—guests include Dave Sim
- June 12–13: Great Eastern Conventions III (Jacob K. Javits Convention Center, New York City)
- June 18–20: Dallas Fantasy Fair II (Dallas Market Hall Convention Center, Dallas, Texas)—guests include Clive Barker (special guest) and Dave Sim
- June 25–27: Atlanta Fantasy Fair XIX (Hyatt Atlanta Airport, Atlanta, Georgia)—official guests include David Prowse, Grace Lee Whitney, Caroline Munro, Monique Gabrielle, Jeff Rector, Gunnar Hanson, Irish McCalla
- July 2–4: Chicago Comicon (Rosemont Convention Center, Rosemont, Illinois)—20,000–30,000 attendees; guest of honor: Neil Gaiman; other guests include Dave Sim
- July 16–18: Dragon Con Atlanta Comics Expo (Atlanta Hilton & Towers, Atlanta, Georgia)—8,000 attendees; presentation of the Wizard Fan Awards
- August 7–8: Houston Comic Book Festival (University Center, University of Houston, Houston, Texas)—first annual edition; guests include Chris Claremont, Matt Wagner, Kelley Jones, Joe St. Pierre, Evan Dorkin, and Mike Leeke
- August 19–22: San Diego Comic-Con (San Diego Convention Center and Doubletree Hotel, San Diego, California)—28,000 attendees. Special guests include Murphy Anderson, Jim Aparo, Peter Bagge, Dan Clowes, Nancy Collins, Paul Dini, Garth Ennis, Ferd Johnson, Rick Kirkman, Don Martin, Olivia, Dave Sim, Vin Sullivan, Michael Whelan, Robert Williams, and Roger Zelazny
- October 8–11: Comicfest '93 (Philadelphia Civic Center, Philadelphia, Pennsylvania)—produced by David Greenhill Promotions; guests included Harlan Ellison, Jim Shooter; infamous debate about Image Comics between Peter David and Todd McFarlane, moderated by George Pérez
- November 13–14: Mid-Ohio Con (Hyatt Regency/Convention Center, Columbus, Ohio)—guests include John Byrne, Mike Mignola, Roger Stern, Dave Sim

== Awards ==
- First annual publication of the Wizard Fan Awards, presented at Dragon*Con.

== First issues by title ==
=== Sirius Entertainment ===
- Animal Mystic

=== DC Comics ===
- Batman: In Darkest Knight
- Black Canary (vol. 2)
- Bloodlines
- Catwoman (vol. 2)
- Chain Gang War
- Hawkman (vol. 3)
- Justice League Task Force
- Legacy of Superman
- Lobo
- Lobo annual
- Metal Men limited series
- The Outsiders (vol. 2)
- Robin monthly series (vol. 2)
- Showcase 93
- Supergirl (vol. 3)
- Trinity

=== Image Comics ===
- 1963
- Freak Force
- Stormwatch

=== Malibu Ultraverse ===
- Break-Thru
- Exiles
- Freex
- Hardcase
- Mantra
- Prime
- Sludge
- Solitaire
- The Nightman
- The Solution
- The Strangers

=== Marvel Comics ===
- Deadpool
- Doom 2099
- Midnight Sons Unlimited
- Night Thrasher
- Nova (vol. 2)
- Punisher 2099
- Spider-Man Unlimited
- Transformers: Generation 2
- X-Men 2099
- X-Men Unlimited

=== Milestone Comics ===
- Blood Syndicate
- Hardware
- Icon
- Static

Writer: Dwayne McDuffie. Artist: John Paul Leon
