= Fantastic Four 2099 =

1996 Marvel Comics series

- Cover to Fantastic Four 2099 #7 (July 1996). Art by Pascual Ferry.

Publication information
- Publisher: Marvel Comics
- Schedule: Monthly
- Format: Ongoing series
- Genre: Superhero
- Publication date: January – August 1996
- No. of issues: 8

Creative team
- Written by: Karl Kesel; Ben Raab; Terry Kavanagh
- Penciller(s): Pascual Ferry; Matt Ryan; John Buscema; Rick Leonardi
- Inker(s): Al Williamson; Art Thibert
- Colorist: Paul Becton

Fantastic Four 2099 is a comic book series published by Marvel Comics, featuring the adventures of the Fantastic Four in the alternate future of Marvel 2099 (Earth-928). It ran for eight issues in 1996.

== Plot ==
In the year 2099, Mister Fantastic, Invisible Woman, Human Torch, and Thing find themselves in new uniforms and transported to a very different Negative Zone than the one they knew. Returning home, they find the world changed and S.H.I.E.L.D. soldiers chasing after them as laboratory copies of the original Fantastic Four.

During a fight with a repo-man crew named Total Recall, a church dedicated to the worship of the 22nd century's Thor is destroyed and the FF escape with an injured Human Torch to an abandoned S.H.I.E.L.D. hideout. They discover, through the repo-men, that the corporation Stark-Fujikawa is claiming them as "experimental subjects". They head to an Alchemax facility to prove their originality. The four encounter the new century's Spider-Man. He helps Reed study the group's DNA. Unfortunately, due to the nature of the 2099 technology, the results were inconclusive, leaving their legitimacy in question.

They then break into their old headquarters at Four Freedoms Plaza with the help of their friend, Chimera, who came back with them from the Negative Zone. Before they can return to the Negative Zone to find a way home, they are attacked by a man named River Styx, the demon brother of Chimera, as well as a group of S.H.I.E.L.D. soldiers. In the course of the battle the Negative Zone door is damaged, causing a dimensional 'meltdown'. Rampaging beasts called the Mindless Ones attack, until they are destroyed by the 22nd century Doctor Strange. Strange then leaps into the future to warn the denizens of Earth of the approaching end of the world.

A planetoid is headed to Earth, causing the polar ice caps to melt. This is caused by the Phalanx, an act which covers most of Earth in water. The Fantastic Four set up headquarters in their old building to help Earth's future inhabitants. The Human Torch heads out to investigate the flooding, but is ambushed and captured by the Atlanteans and their leader Attuma. The Invisible Woman and the Thing rush to his rescue, getting themselves captured as well. They find themselves caught in the middle of a fight between Attuma and the rightful ruler of Atlantis, the mutant Whisper, a former guardian of X-Nation. Despite chemical brainwashing, the three heroes help Whisper take her rightful place on the throne.

Back in the city, Reed and the future Doctor Doom work with the remaining survivors. While fleeing the city towards the Savage Land, the only place on Earth free from flooding, a fleet of Atlantean ships attacks the remaining humans. The human fleet is saved from destruction by the interference of Doom's Latverian Luftwaffe, and by Whisper, as she asserts her newfound control.

=== Savage Land ===
The Fantastic Four, along with the last refugees of Earth, settle in the Savage Land to rebuild humanity. Their next step is to send out a ship piloted by the Thing, and crewed by Father Jennifer and the mutants December, Twilight, and Smith. The goal is to rendezvous with the human colony on Mars, in order to establish relations and ask for help. Cosmic rays cause the ship to crash.

Back on Earth, Johnny and Susan despair as Reed drives himself to exhaustion to establish a technological infrastructure for the remaining humans. All three grieve for Ben's presumed loss, but Reed takes it the worst, hallucinating that Metalhead is Ben.

Sue and Johnny confront Reed, who states his intention to stay in the 2099 era. They leave him behind. Reed accomplishes his goal, creating a repository of knowledge for the last of humanity. Shocked back to sanity by the databank's physical resemblance to his son Franklin, Reed races back to Four Freedoms Plaza just in time to join Johnny and Sue. They vanish into the Negative Zone, destination uncertain.

The mutants later return to Earth with Martian aliens and resources in an attempt to help the survivors.

=== Earth-96943 ===
Later in the Marvel 2099 reality of Earth-96943, it is shown that this reality's version of the Fantastic Four team were clones created by Uatu the Watcher to help 2099 humanity which is in danger of extinction. Uatu is persuaded by the 2099 version of Moon Knight to keep the current Fantastic Four around and they prove invaluable to rebuilding Earth. Some of the highlights of their careers include becoming official Avengers, removing a barrier to space exploration, and establishing a peace treaty with the Atlanteans.
