= 2099 (disambiguation) =

2099 (MMXCIX) is a year in the 2090s decade

2099 may also refer to

- The year 2099 BC in the 21st century BC
- 2099 (number), the number
- "2099", a song by Charli XCX featuring Troye Sivan from Charli (2019)
- 2099 Öpik, a Mars-crosser asteroid
- 2099 series, 1999-2000 books by British writer John Peel
- 2099: World of Tomorrow, a comic book series
- Blade Runner 2099, 2026 television series
- Marvel 2099, comics imprint
- Marvel 2099: One Nation Under Doom, cancelled video game based on the comics imprint
- Space: 2099, proposed remake of TV series Space: 1999
