= Ravage 2099 =

- Cover to Ravage 2099 #1. Art by Paul Ryan.

Publication information
- Publisher: Marvel Comics
- First appearance: Ravage 2099 #1 (December 1992)
- Created by: Stan Lee and Paul Ryan

In-story information
- Alter ego: Paul-Phillip Ravage
- Species: Human (formerly); Human mutate (currently)
- Place of origin: Marvel 2099 (Earth-928)
- Team affiliations: ECO; Alchemax; Green Berets
- Notable aliases: Beast-Man
- Abilities: (First mutation): Bio-energy blasts; (Second mutation): Superhuman strength, stamina, durability, speed, agility, reflexes, and senses; Razor-sharp horns, fangs, and claws; Healing factor

Ravage 2099 (Paul-Phillip Ravage) is a superhero appearing in American comic books published by Marvel Comics.

== Publication history ==
Ravage was created by writer Stan Lee and penciler Paul Ryan in 1992 for Marvel Comics' Marvel 2099 imprint. Ravage's first full appearance was in Ravage 2099 #1, which was released alongside other Marvel 2099 universe titles Spider-Man 2099, Doom 2099, and Punisher 2099. Unlike the other titles, Ravage was original, not a re-imagined version of an existing character. The series ran for 33 issues cover-dated December 1992 to August 1995.

Ryan said artist John Byrne had originally been on Ravage 2099 but that, "Apparently there were creative differences. It didn't work out. John walked away … I was pretty good friends with Tom DeFalco, who was the Editor-in-Chief at the time," and so Ryan offered to lend a hand if needed. "I wasn't looking for another series because I was working on two at the time. Couple of days later, Tom calls me and says how would you like to do Ravage 2099? … I said why don't you check with Stan first to make sure its ok if I pencil the series … and Stan said, Why not?"

Ryan designed the character, doing "three or four incarnations" that kept getting rejected by Lee and editor Joey Cavalieri. "And I was getting very frustrated because this is for free basically when you are developing the character. So my wife Linda says "Why don't you just call Stan? Find out what he wants firsthand." Ryan did so, and with Lee doing "most of the talking, I just listened and was sketching out what he was describing. So then I faxed it over to him. He had several minor tweaks to it, but he said this is what I want. I said great."

Lee wrote through issue #8 (July 1993), which he plotted only, leaving the script to writers Pat Mills and Tony Skinner, who then fully wrote the series from #9-32 (August 1993 - July 1995), with Ian Edgington writing the finale. Lee said in an interview that he had wanted Marvel "to create a new line of superheroes. I said, 'What if we did our characters 100 years from now?'" He said Ravage 2099 was "different from anything I've done before. I'm taking my time with the story. He doesn't even get his superpowers until the end of the fourth issue."

Grant Miehm became the regular penciler with issue #8, then Joe Bennett from #22-31 (September 1994 - June 1995). José Delbo filled-in on #9, and Marcos Tetelli penciled the last two issues.

Lee's Spider-Man co-creator, Steve Ditko had originally been considered as penciler after Byrne left, according to Tom DeFalco:

Stan said he'd love to work with Ditko again, so I gave Steve a call, and he agreed to come in and meet with Stan. The fan in me was thinking ‘I'm going to watch history unfold —Stan Lee and Steve Ditko in the same room together.' Steve came in, very flattered to be asked. The guys started to shake hands, then gave each other a big hug. It was a very warm reception between the two of them, and it was obvious these were two guys who really liked each other and really respected each other. Stan laid out his ideas for the series, they had a really terrific discussion going back and forth. … [But Ditko] just didn't agree with some of the philosophical underpinnings. Stan thanked him a lot, and they opened the door for future work together. Steve walked away, and I could tell he was really thrilled to have seen Stan.

== Fictional character biography ==
Paul-Phillip Ravage is the chief executive officer of ECO Central, a subsidiary of the corporation Alchemax, which works to combat polluters. Ravage is framed for murder in response to questioning the secrets of the company and the violent, often fatal, methods it uses. Becoming a fugitive, Ravage is the target of both the police and Alchemax executive Anderthorp Henton. His companions while on the run are African-American orphan Dack, the son of a man his company killed, and Tiana Sikoski, an Asian-American woman who had been his secretary. Ravage becomes the hero of the Decred Barrio, an impoverished community of superhero worshipers located on the outskirts of the city. Ravage frees Tiana from Lord Dethstryk, the last legally elected American president exiled to Hellrock for his crimes who wore dark armor to control his deadly power of disintegration and planned to invade the rest of the world and destroy all humans. Dethstryk would become Ravage's primary nemesis.

On Hellrock, where genetic scientist Dr. Ursell began helping him, Ravage is mutated by prolonged exposure to the island's radiation and biohazards. For a short time, his hands generate lethal energy. Eventually, Ravage's body evolves into an animalistic form with the ability to regenerate from almost any wound. Ravage soon found he could also transform back to human form when necessary. Ravage attempts to control his monstrous form, with mixed results, and comes to accept it. Ravage later kills Dethstryk and takes over Hellrock. Ravage presumably dies after Doom immerses him and the rest of the island in liquid adamantium, then launches the island into space.

== Powers, abilities, and equipment ==
Ravage gained powers through surgery and being mutated by the radiation of Hellrock, where he battled Deathstryk to free Tiana. Initially, they consisted of the ability to project bio-kinetic energy beams from his hands that were physically taxing on Ravage. However, these genetic alterations have changed him even further, changing him into an animalistic state. In his new form, he has enhanced strength, stamina, durability, speed, agility, reflexes, healing, and senses, as well as horns, fangs, and claws.

He formerly wore a vest of unknown 21st century fabric lined with "ultimate" Kevlar (an experimental laser-proof material), molecular gloves (to contain the kinetic energies stored up in his hands for one hour), and adjustable opti-lens (that enables long-range telescopic and infra-red sight).

== Collected editions ==
Title	Material collected	Published date	ISBN
Spider-Man 2099 Classic Vol. 3	Ravage 2099 #15 and Spider-Man 2099 (vol. 1)#15–22, X-Men 2099 #5, Doom 2099 #14, Punisher 2099 #13	February 2015	978-0785193029
