= Timestorm 2009–2099 =

Marvel Comics limited series

- Cover to Timestorm 2009–2099 #1. Art by Christopher Shy.

Publication information
- Publisher: Marvel Comics
- Schedule: Monthly
- Format: Limited series
- Genre: Superhero
- Publication date: June – October 2009
- No. of issues: 6 (including Spider-Man and X-Men one-shots)
- Main character(s): Spider-Man; Wolverine; Spider-Man 2099; Punisher 2099; Shakti Haddad

Creative team
- Written by: Brian Reed
- Penciller: Eric Battle
- Inker(s): Vincente Cifuentes; Andrew Hennessy
- Letterer: Dave Sharpe
- Colorist: Bruno Hang
- Editor(s): Michael Horwitz; Joe Quesada; Bill Rosemann

Collected editions
- Hardcover: ISBN 0-7851-3922-2

Timestorm 2009–2099 is a 2009 Marvel Comics limited series. It was written by Brian Reed with pencils by Eric Battle. The series is a crossover between the mainstream Marvel Universe and a universe very similar to, but with notable differences from, the Marvel 2099 universe.

== Publication history ==
Timestorm 2009–2099 is a four-issue mini-series, with two one-shots to give the story extra depth. These two one-shots focus on Spider-Man and Wolverine, with art by Wes Craig and Frazer Irving, respectively.

== Synopsis ==
In the future, Jake Gallows is sent to the present by Alchemax CEO Tyler Stone to eliminate superheroes. Gallows uses a chrono-device to send Spider-Man and Wolverine to his own time, thereby altering the future. There, Miguel O'Hara meets with some of his friends (Kron Stone, Dana D'Angelo, Reilly and Xina) to see a combatant called the Human Torch at an underground arena. Elsewhere, Shakti Haddad is taken into custody by officers of the "Public Eye", wearing uniforms reminiscent of Jake Gallows'. In her cell, Shakti meets Spider-Man and realizes that he does not belong. Wolverine, meanwhile, finds himself in front of a group of Gamma-irradiated monsters. He is rescued by Kenshiro Cochrane, who mistakenly thinks he is one of Logan's children. While still imprisoned, Peter and Shakti experience another time event, altering some buildings in an explosion. At that precise moment, Miguel and classmate Kron Stone find themselves in the midst of that explosion, along with their experimented-upon arachnids (Miguel's Spider and Kron's Scorpion). In the hospital where Miguel and Kron are taken, George is glad to find that Miguel is alright, while Tyler is saddened and distressed that his son has not survived. With George and Miguel leaving, Tyler falls into tears having removed the sheet covering Kron's body, revealing that his son has the half mutated body of a scorpion. Tyler arranges for his son to be transferred to Alchemax in a tube, where his appearance cannot be seen.

Peter recovers, breaks out of his cell and retrieves his mask and web-shooters. He escapes with Shakti and goes into hiding while hunted by law enforcement. Within a week, Miguel develops new spider powers, obtained in the blast. Deciding to try his newfound powers, he falls due to a lack of confidence and is caught by Spider-Man, who is with Shakti.

Near them, an explosion issues from the Alchemax building. Spider-Man leaves to investigate and Miguel, in his own Spider-Man costume designed by Shakti, assists him. Inside the building, the team encounter and defeat the Scorpion (who they do not recognize as Kron). With the Public Eye's arrival at the scene, both Spider-Men are forced to stop them, but Miguel's father is left as a witness. In the aftermath, Spider-Man insists that Miguel get rid of his costume and stop acting as Spider-Man, fearing that he might be killed. Spider-Man then takes off, realizing that Shakti is missing. Without heeling Spider-Man's advice, Miguel wears the costume again and enters an underground arena as a combatant facing off against the Human Torch. Although Miguel is defeated, the Torch is impressed with his skills and offers to teach him to fight, but Miguel is unable to reply as the guards shock them unconscious.

In the meantime, Ghost Rider 2099 drops Logan in a former mutant-internment facility in a desert wasteland, formerly known as Maryland. There, Logan comes face-to-face with his future self, a bald old man with only his right arm, who now leads the new team of X-Men, headquartered at the facility. He also meets a new generation mutant named Henri Huang (code name Meanstreak) and robot bodyguard Junkpile, as well as two other mutants in the facility: Ruth Kristen Porter (Krystalin) and Lemuel (Bloodhawk).

Logan later discovers that the entire wasteland has been overrun by Hulks, who have eaten most of its food supplies and leave portions only for some civilizations, allowing others to starve. The X-Men have gained some co-operation from certain human civilizations for support, and perform joint operations against the Hulks as they attempt to restore a human civilization in Baltimore. When a group of human soldiers begins an assault against a group of Hulks, the X-Men, along with Logan, join the fight and kill several Hulks. When Ghost Rider arrives, the 2099 Logan asks Wolverine to go with him and find the one person that will help them. When Ghost Rider and Wolverine arrive at the Smithsonian in Washington D.C., they enter an old building and head towards the basement, where Wolverine is shocked to discover that Doctor Doom is there, barely alive. Doom reveals to Wolverine that both he and Spider-Man are in the future and that the timestream is in a state of chaos; he tells them that he plans to assist them before he dies.

While imprisoned in the Arena Cell, both Miguel (Spider-Man) and Relur (the Human Torch) reveal their identities to each other. Relur is one of the few existing Atlantian Mutants who were able to escape; he attributes his success to his fire ability; Miguel reveals his name and why he is there. After their discussion the two escape. Meanwhile, George tricks Lyla and puts her out of commission for a few hours. He then hacks into the Chronosphere and is surprised to see that it shows Jake Gallows, but is even more surprised that he is in the past.

When George tries to contact Jake, Jake mistakes him for Thor, which puzzles George and gives him cause to question what Tyler was doing. While still searching for Shakti, Spider-Man sees both Miguel and Relur pass by and confronts Miguel as to why he still wears his Spider-Man costume. In the Smithsonian, Doctor Doom reveals to both Logan and Kenshiro that they must find Shakti in New York before he dies, but not before another time event is experienced. The damaged time stream allows past and future eras to clash, causing individuals to crossover and leaving both Shakti and the Hulks in 2009 New York.

== Characters ==
=== Main characters ===
Peter Parker/Spider-Man – Sent to the future by a determined Jake Gallows, Peter is captured by the Public Eye. He meets Miguel who recently became the new Spider-Man and worries for his safety.

Miguel O'Hara/Spider-Man 2099 – A highschool student attending Pym Academy and son of Alchemax scientist George O'Hara. Miguel was caught in an explosion caused by the time flux while in class experimenting a spider, causing particles from the spider to transfer onto Miguel, granting him spider powers. Although inexperienced, he dons the identity of Spider-Man.

Logan/Wolverine – Transported into the year 2099 by Jake Gallows while tracking down members of the Hand with Luke Cage, Logan ends up in a desert wasteland, once Washington D.C., where he is confronted by a group of Hulks.

Logan/Wolverine 2099 – The future version of Logan, who is now an old man with no hair who had lost his right arm due to his battles against the Hulks. He found a new race of mutants and recruits them to his X-Men team. Their headquarters are in a former Mutant containment facility called Fort Dawson in Maryland. Logan and his team are trying to rebuild Baltimore, which was destroyed in a war, and must restore civilization and defend it against an army of mindless Hulks.

Jake Gallows/Punisher 2099 – An employee of Alchemax and law enforcer of the "Public Eye", Jake travels back in time and is responsible for sending both Spider-Man and Wolverine to 2099. He has a strong hatred for the Heroes and would not hesitate to kill them, as his family was killed by armed men wearing X-Men masks. It is later revealed that his co-workers were responsible for his family's death because Gallows had previously testified about a crime.

Shakti Haddad/Cerebra 2099 – A mutant girl with brain-like hair who has the power to reveal someone's history, both past and future, through touch. Shakti met Peter while they were imprisoned. She escaped with Peter and met Miguel, who was testing his powers, and suggested the design of Miguel's Spider-Man costume.

=== Villains ===
Tyler Stone – Alchemax's Chief Executive, Tyler approved the development of the "Chronosphere" system, which monitors all of society and was responsible for the history alterations made using Jake Gallows as the voice of Thor. He unintentionally caused the explosion which placed Kron, mostly in a Scorpion body.

Kron Stone/Scorpion 2099 – A high school bully and son of Alchemax's Chief Executive Tyler Stone. Kron was caught in the blast with Miguel while in his classroom, due to the blast from the time flux, unintentionally caused by his father and Jake in the past. He was exposed to the Scorpion's particles and has the Scorpion's appearance.

The Announcer – A man who watches his combatants fight to the death in the Ultimate Combat Arena for public ratings. Responsible for coordinating most of the fights and mostly involves the Human Torch.

=== Other characters ===
- George O'Hara – The father of Miguel O'Hara and a scientist of Alchemax, George has been taking care of his son since his wife died and is worried for Miguel's safety. George has growing suspicious about Tyler Stone and Lyla are doing with Chronosphere and tries to find out what he is planning.
- Lyla – A holographic system and assistant of Alchemax CEO Tyler Stone, Lyla notifies him about the history alteration and its progress, Lyla also notifies George about his son, Miguel. She appears to know about the events involving the Chronosphere, which causes George to doubt her and Stone. She is shut down for three hours while George and his friends observe what is inside the chronosphere, and links with Jake Gallows.
- Relur/Human Torch 2099 – An Atlantean with fire-based superhuman abilities and a combatant who has won countless victories in the underground arenas. He admires Miguel as he is the only one to have lasted longer than any of his prior opponents. He is one of the few Atlanteans to develop mutant powers, but because of his fire-based abilities, the other Atlanteans deemed him a threat, forcing Relur to escape to the surface world.
- Kenshiro Cochrane/Ghost Rider 2099 – Kenshiro first met Logan thinking he was one of Logan's children. He is revealed to be a part of an organization called O.R.B.I.T.
- Hulk 2099 – As opposed to the original Hulk 2099, Hulks have become a species, as a gamma bomb was dropped on Washington D.C., turning all into Hulks. In a desert wasteland formerly known as Washington D.C., many other Hulks appear to have targeted Wolverine, who was transported by Jake and first encountered them and survived. Throughout the years the Hulk population expanded, leaving a portion of food left for humans to eat. Since then both human forces and existing mutants have been fighting the Hulks to preserve the food.
- Henri Huang/Meanstreak – A mutant who can run as fast as Quicksilver and is part of Logan's new X-Men team. Meanstreak is an easy going person who enjoys the speed.
- Lemuel/Bloodhawk – A red winged mutant and another member of Logan's X-Men team. This version of Bloodhawk is female and has the ability to give life or take it with only a touch, similar to Xi'an.
- Ruth Kristen Porter/Krystalin – Another member of Logan's X-Men, Ruth has the ability to absorb pollution from the air, turn it into crystals and use them for offensive maneuvers, but has trouble aiming.
- Junkpile – An android and bodyguard of the X-Men team, this version of Junkpile formerly belonged to Tony Stark before it was destroyed. It was later rebuilt and was given its own personality, similar to Tony's.
- Doctor Doom – First appeared near the end of Timestorm 2009–2099: X-Men. Doom was contained in a facility, barely alive but nearing his end, in the Smithsonian in Washington, D.C., where he was found by Logan and Ghost Rider. In Timestorm 2009–2099 #3, he gives Ghost Rider 2099 information to find Shakti Haddad in Manhattan. He then dies.

==== Minor characters ====
- Dana D'Angelo – A classmate and love interest of Miguel, Dana is attracted to Kron Stone and is friends with Reilly and Xina. This version of Dana has light purple hair colour.
- Xina – The girlfriend of Reilly and friend of Dana. Xina does not like having Miguel around, but has allowed him since he is with Dana and is somewhat a friend of Reilly.
- Reilly – Xina's boyfriend and friends of Kron Stone. Reilly is somewhat of a friend of Miguel, but mostly hangs out with Kron because of their interest in sports.

== Editions ==
The series was collected into a single hardcover volume:

- Timestorm 2009/2099 (collects Timestorm 2009–2099 #1–4, Timestorm 2009–2099: Spider-Man, Timestorm 2009–2099: X-Men), 144 pages, December 2009, ISBN 0-7851-3922-2

== Reception ==
IGN gave the first issue a 7.2 out of 10 and the second issue 5.7 out of 10.
