= X-Nation 2099 =

Comic book series

- Cover to X-Nation 2099 #2. Art by Humberto Ramos.

Publication information
- Publisher: Marvel Comics
- Schedule: Monthly
- Publication date: March – August 1996
- No. of issues: 6

Creative team
- Created by: Tom Peyer (writer); Humberto Ramos (pencils)

X-Nation 2099 was a comic book series created by Marvel Comics for their Marvel 2099 imprint. It depicts the course of events in a team of young mutants' lives. The series only lasted six issues.

== Fictional team biography ==
In the year 2099, Victor Von Doom approaches Cerebra of the X-Men with a proposition. He tells her that, through a mathematical probability program, he had deduced that there would be a mutant Messiah in the next generation, and he offers her the position of finding it for him. Cerebra agrees and leaves the X-Men in search of this figure who would lead all of mutantkind into a golden age. She begins finding candidates and bringing them to the Xavier Center, which is watched over by a militant sect of nuns named the Sisters of the Howling Commandments. She is aided, albeit unwillingly, by Morphine Somers, former Minister of Humanity and interim liaison to Halo City while Doom was still President.

The group's first adventure begins with them sneaking out of the Xavier Home. After a night hanging out at the local Milk Bar, they end up fighting the Wild Boys, a gang of young mutants that Wulff used to belong to. They escape and return home, but are forced to do construction work as punishment for sneaking out. While serving their punishment, they are attacked by bounty hunters from the "Million Palms" Amusement Park. The park is ruled by the villain Avian, who once held December and Willow prisoner. The team fights together to fend off the attack, but when the smoke clears they notice that Willow is gone.

Once again, the teens leave the shelter to confront Avian and rescue Willow, but they are captured as they enter Million Palms. There they meet Metalsmith, another young mutant, and find out that Avian is also searching for the mutant messiah, under the command of Doom's enemy John Herod. With the timely arrival of Willow, X-Nation escapes and heads back home. Meanwhile, the shelter is attacked by Atlantean soldiers. The sisters beat them back, but are eventually defeated. The teens arrive back home just in time to see the shelter explode.

Without a home and with floodwaters rising from the melting of the polar ice caps, X-Nation turns to the newly arrived Exodus, who promises to lead them into a new era of power. Cerebra battles Exodus, who shows his true colors, wanting to help mutants rise up to rule over humans. Clarion sacrifices himself to destroy Exodus and the remaining members of X-Nation evacuate to the Savage Land with the rest of humanity to escape the floods and the coming of the Phalanx.

At the start of the new imprint, 2099: World of Tomorrow, X-Nation is split. December, Twilight, and Metalsmith join Father Jennifer D'Angelo and Ben Grimm on a trip to the Alchemax Mars colony to see if it is possible for the remaining residents of Earth to relocate to Mars. There they meet Dr. Isaacs, Clarion's mother, and the resident Martians, known as the Takers. It is revealed that several years prior, the Phalanx decimated Mars, killing most of the Takers, with fewer than a dozen surviving. Smith and Twilight travel with them on a rocket ship, landing on the Phalanx planetoid that is trying to assimilate Earth, and battle to destroy the Phalanx. From Earth, the semi-sentient database robot built by Reed Richards uplinks to the collective and dubs their plan to destroy all human life as "evil." He triggers the self-destruct sequence of the planetoid and it explodes, killing the remaining Takers as well as Smith and Twilight. December and Isaacs are left on Mars to mourn the loss. It is also revealed that Isaacs had cloned Clarion before leaving for the Mars project, but none of the clones survived.

Meanwhile, Wulff and Uproar travel to Humanity's Last Refuge, a new colony in the Savage Land. After hearing a rumor about the Wild Boys, they stow away on a ship bearing Spider-Man to Latveria. The ship is destroyed and they are rescued by an armada of roaming ships belonging to Vulture, leader of the Wild Boys. Uproar is forced to fight in the Gauntlet, brutal kill or be killed games used as entertainment. Though he continues winning, he is kept captive because he refuses to kill his opponent. Wulff is imprisoned and through torture is reverted to a feral werewolf-like form. Together, Wulff and Uproar escape and destroy the armada. This leaves them adrift in the middle of the ocean, where they part ways.

Nostromo and Willow join the X-pedition team at the Last Refuge, traveling underground with La Lunatica, Bloodhawk, Jade Ryuteki, Drew Hodge, and Mr. Winn to search for supplies and explore the surrounding terrain. They come upon a crashed spaceship, but accidentally set off a self-destruct program. Willow morphs into the dead alien to stop the self-destruct, but is unable to revert to her human form. She attacks Winn, but is able to regain control of herself. Nostromo then reveals himself to be the Phalanx Scout, while Winn having been a Phalanx agent. Winn takes Nostromo to Latveria to uplink with the collective while the others return to the surface and battle a Phalanx Dread Node, as it attempts to assimilate the Savage Land. Nostromo is linked with the Phalanx. Doom, who had known about the scout program since the Phalanx invasion of the 20th century, activates a hidden subroutine in his programming that breaks him from the collective. As he escapes with Spider-Man and Xina Kwan, Doom sacrifices himself to destroy the rest of the Phalanx on Earth. Doom's will names Nostromo as heir to the throne of Latveria.

== Members ==
Character	Real name	Joined in	Notes
Clarion	Hayes Isaacs	2099 A.D. Genesis	Able to absorb sound from his environment and converts it into energy blasts. Hayes sacrificed himself to protect his friends from Exodus. His name is a nod to soul musician Isaac Hayes. Hayes was also cloned by his mother, a scientist on Alchemax's Mars colony, though none of the clones survived.
December	Winter Frost	2099 A.D. Genesis	Generates intense blasts of cold from her hands to freeze the air around her into arctic gale winds, allowing her to flash freeze or freeze dry objects in her surroundings.
Metalsmith	Shane Lee	X-Nation 2099 #2	Total control over ferrous metals, allowing him to reshape, liquify, and magnetically levitate metal objects. Killed while fighting the Phalanx.
Nostromo	Gabriel Hess	2099 A.D. Genesis	Technological mutation gives him the ability to interface with and restructure technological devices with his arms (which fuse to the technology), heal wounds by covering them with metallic plating. Nostromo is later revealed to have been a scout for the Phalanx. After the defeat of the Phalanx and Doom's death, Nostromo becomes the ruler of Latveria.
Twilight	Aminah Ferrara	2099 A.D. Genesis	Able to bend reality in a contained area dubbed her "sphere of influence" which allows her to do numerous things including alter her body to produce flight, intangibility, cause things to burn, disintegrate, change in size, melt, or reform in various ways, and teleportation of herself and others. Killed while fighting the Phalanx.
Uproar	Matt Finn	2099 A.D. Genesis	Increase his body's size, mass, height, strength, and density.
Willow	Willow Pierre	2099 A.D. Genesis	Able to shapeshift her body to match the exact genetic signature (and the clothes) of whoever she is duplicating, except for a symbol over her left eye.
Wulff	Sebastian Ruud	X-Men 2099 #30	Animal-like physiology grants him enhanced speed, strength, stamina, reflexes, senses, healing ability, as well as sharp claws and teeth. He was formerly a member of the villainous group the Wild Boys, but reformed. Forcefully reverted to a previous werewolf-like form by the Vulture, boss of the Wild Boys.

== Supporting cast ==
- Cerebra – A founding member of the X-Men 2099. Doom put Cerebra in charge of his "Mutant Messiah" hunt, and therefore in charge of training them. Her Mutant power allows her to detect nearby mutants and telepathically control the nervous system of other beings.
- Morphine Somers – Doom's Minister of Humanity and interim liaison to Halo City; later ousted when his bid to be elected to the Halo City counsel failed. Morphine convinced Wulff to join X-Nation, thereby inserting himself as Cerebra's assistant.
- Sister Nicholas – A militaristic nun who lived in Halo City with her cloister, the Sisters of the Howling Commandments, a pun on Nick Fury's Howling Commandos.

There were plans to add two more members to X-Nation 2099, but the plans were scrapped when Tom Peyer and Humberto Ramos left the book within the first three issues. Despite appearing on both the cover of the first issue and the Warren Ellis special 2099: Genesis, the characters were never formally introduced. Only one of them was named — an Indian mutant named Caravan — but his powers were never shown.
