= Phastos =

Marvel Comics fictional character

- Phastos. Art by Mark Texeira.

Publication information
- Publisher: Marvel Comics
- First appearance: The Eternals (vol. 2) #1 (October 1985)
- Created by: Peter B. Gillis; Sal Buscema

In-story information
- Species: Eternal
- Notable aliases: Hephaestus; Vulcan; Ceasefire; Phillip Stoss
- Abilities: Eternal physiology granting superhuman speed, strength, durability, and immortality; Cosmic energy manipulation; Matter transmutation; Illusion generation; Teleportation; Flight

Phastos is a fictional character appearing in American comic books published by Marvel Comics. Created by Peter B. Gillis and Sal Buscema, the character first appeared in The Eternals (vol. 2) #1 (October 1985). He is a member of the Eternals, a human offshoot race in the Marvel Universe.

Brian Tyree Henry portrays Phastos in the Marvel Cinematic Universe film Eternals (2021).

== Publication history ==
Phastos was created by writer Peter B. Gillis and artist Sal Buscema. He first appeared in The Eternals vol. 2 #1 (October 1985), and received a more substantial role beginning with issue #3. In the series, he was established as the Eternals' weaponsmith and technologist, as well as a character who was reluctant to participate in warfare.

Following the conclusion of the series, Phastos appeared in The Avengers #308 and #310 and in the one-shot Eternals: The Herod Factor. He later appeared in New Eternals: Apocalypse Now (2000), in which the Eternals adopted public superhero identities and Phastos used the name Ceasefire.

Phastos returned as a supporting character in the 2008–2009 Eternals series by Charles and Daniel Knauf. In this storyline, Sprite's alteration of reality had caused him to live as Phillip Stoss, an automotive engineer in Germany, without knowledge of his identity as an Eternal. His memories were eventually restored by Ikaris.

During the 2010s, Phastos appeared in the X-Men: First to Last storyline, Thor: The Deviants Saga, and the fifth volume of New Warriors. These stories further used him in connection with the ancient history of human evolution, the Deviants, and the High Evolutionary.

Phastos subsequently played a significant role in Kieron Gillen and Esad Ribić's Eternals series, published from 2021 to 2022. The storyline revealed that the Eternals' resurrection system caused the death of a human each time it restored an Eternal. After discovering this, Phastos attempted to stop the process, bringing him into conflict with the other Eternals and involving him in the return of Thanos.

In 2022, Phastos appeared in the A.X.E.: Judgment Day crossover, which brought the Eternals into conflict with the X-Men over mutant resurrection and subsequently involved the Avengers and the Celestial known as the Progenitor.

== Fictional character biography ==
Phastos's history is very murky. He is a third or fourth generation Eternal and is mistaken with Greek god Hephaestus or Roman god Vulcan. He is the chief engineer and technologist for Eternals, and has forged many weapons for them including the sword for Kingo Sunen. He was also the teacher of the Eternal scientist Sigmar.

He made a deal with Sprite to get this memories rewritten in exchange for more knowledge, hence forgetting his life as an Eternal and he chose to live in exile. He chose to remain on Earth because of his search for meaning of life and became Phillip Stoss, an automotive engineer in Zuffenhausen. He regained his memories when Ikaris blasted at him with cosmic energy. He continues to serve as the master technologist and engineer of the Eternal race, and it was his genius which allowed Virako to return from apparent death. Although he is a pacifist, Phastos chose to follow Ikaris into battle against the minions of Apocalypse.

== Powers and abilities ==
As an Eternal, Phastos has superhuman speed, strength, durability, and is immortal. He can project "Cosmic Energy" in the form of beams from his eyes and hands. His cosmic energy manipulation allows flight, illusion generation, matter transmutation, and teleportation.

Phastos is a skilled engineer, technologist and inventor. His hammer can fire bolts of an unidentified energy.

== Other versions ==
=== Earth-90559 ===
On Earth-90559 in the year 2115 AD, Phastos and Ajak were trapped in the Uni-Mind.

=== Marvel 2099 ===
In the unified Marvel 2099 reality of Earth-2099, Phastos is a member of the Avengers until he is killed by the Masters of Evil.

== In other media ==
- Phastos appears in Eternals, portrayed by Brian Tyree Henry. This version is gay and was sent to Earth in 5,000 BC to progress the planet's societal development and protect it from the Deviants. He guided and progressed many technological revolutions throughout the course of human history, but fell into a state of dejection after realizing that his actions contributed to the creation of the atomic bomb. In the present day, Phastos settled and started a family with his husband Ben and they raised a son named Jack. Phastos and the Eternals later learn that they were intended to aid in the birth of Tiamut, which would destroy Earth. The Eternals are divided, with Phastos choosing to protect Earth and prevent the Emergence. For his actions, Phastos is abducted by Arishem.
- Phastos appears in Marvel Snap.
