= Bloodties =

1993 Marvel Comics storyline

- Cover of Avengers/X-Men: Bloodties (1995), trade paperback collected edition, art by Klaus Janson
- Publisher: Marvel Comics
- Publication date: November – December 1993
- Genre: Superhero; Crossover
Title(s)
The Avengers vol. 1, #368-369
Avengers West Coast #101
The Uncanny X-Men #307
X-Men vol. 2, #26
- Main character(s): Avengers; X-Men; Exodus; Fabian Cortez; Nick Fury

Creative team
- Writer(s): Bob Harras; Scott Lobdell; Fabian Nicieza; Ben Raab; Roy Thomas
- Penciller(s): Jim Cheung; Jan Duursema; Steve Epting; Andy Kubert; John Romita Jr. Dave Ross
- Inker(s): Tim Dzon; Dan Green; Andy Lanning; Tom Palmer; Matt Ryan

"Bloodties" is a 1993 Avengers/X-Men crossover that celebrates the 30th anniversary of both franchises. It is a direct sequel to the X-Men "Fatal Attractions" storyline, in which Charles Xavier mindwipes Magneto. The story of "Bloodties" details a civil war between the human and mutant populations of Genosha, incited by Magneto's former protégé Fabian Cortez. Unaware of Magneto's incapacitation, Cortez attempts to shield himself from his former master's wrath by kidnapping Magneto's granddaughter Luna. As Luna's father Quicksilver has strong ties to the X-Men and her mother Crystal is a member of the Avengers, both teams become involved in the Genoshan conflict. The situation is further complicated by Magneto's lieutenant and self-proclaimed heir Exodus, who seeks to kill both Cortez for his betrayal and Luna for "disgracing" Magneto's line by being merely human.

== Plot ==
=== Part I: "Family Legacies" ===
Genosha is embroiled in a civil war between humans and mutants due to Fabian Cortez inciting it. Cortez kidnaps Luna (the granddaughter of his former leader Magneto), and forces the child to witness the chaos that is engulfing Genosha's capital Hammer Bay. Meanwhile, Nick Fury informs the Avengers of the situation in Genosha should not be in their worries until Valerie Cooper and the United Nations give the greenlight to them. Many Avenger members question the government's paranoia. When Crystal retrieves what was thought to be Luna, the Black Knight smacks her away, revealing to be a Genoshan mutate warning the Avengers the end of Genosha is near. Professor X and the X-Men learn of the Genoshan civil war and split up, with Professor X and Beast to leave with U.S. Agent and Henry Peter Gyrich, and the X-Men leaving right behind them. Back at Avengers Mansion, the Avengers go against Fury's orders and decide to go to Genosha, only to have S.H.I.E.L.D. halt them. While the two strike teams make their way to Genosha, Cortez sends a threatening message to the media, stating that all remaining humans in Genosha will perish at his hands.

=== Part II: "Civil Disobediences" ===
Cortez readies an army of mutants and Mutates to eliminate the humans in Hammer Bay, while Quicksilver expresses rage that Magneto's message will come to fruition. At Avalon, Colossus contemplates what more could be done to help Genosha whilst Exodus interrupts him. Colossus admits he is done fighting for the dreams of other people, and decided to stay in space to find himself again. He leaves as Exodus watches over the comatose Magneto. On Earth, the Avengers have a battle with S.H.I.E.L.D. After the encounter, an Avengers strike team (Captain America, Black Knight, War Machine, Crystal, Scarlet Witch, and Sersi) leave for Genosha, leaving the rest of the Avengers to deal with the United Nations' response. At Genosha, Professor X and Beast break off from their UN allies to meet with the Genoshan Mutate rebels, and U.S. Agent hijacks a vehicle to explore deeper into Genosha. Near Hammer Bay, the X-Men (Cyclops, Storm, Gambit, Rogue, Bishop, Revanche, Jean Grey, Archangel, Iceman, and Quicksilver) are confronted by Cortez and his loyalists. The Avengers arrive at Hammer Bay and encounter Exodus, who warns the heroes Magneto's will live on in Genosha once the humans in the country are exterminated.

=== Part III: "Bloodties" ===
Hawkeye, Black Widow, Hercules, Vision, Spider-Woman, and Giant-Man are taken to the UN Headquarters, where Hawkeye has a full-blown argument with the UN director over the handling of Genosha. Elsewhere, in Hammer Bay, War Machine battles with Exodus as the rest of his teammates deal with the chaos in the streets. The U.S. Agent catches up with Beast and Professor X in the sewers, and the three discover an army of Mutates. The three are discovered by the Genoshan Magistrates. Just outside the city, the X-Men defeat Cortez's loyalists and question Cortez, only to be revealed that a Mutate was impersonating Cortez. Exodus defeats War Machine in a lengthy fight, and shifts his focus to Sersi.

=== Part IV: "Night and Fog" ===
Professor X, Beast, and U.S. Agent battle with the Genoshan Magistrates, and come out victorious. They find Gyrich helping the Mutates, and join with him. Above Hammer Bay, Exodus and Sersi have a violent battle, leading the rest of the heroes to worry about Genosha's impending demise. At the UN Headquarters, Black Widow informs the attendants and UN officials the Avengers will no longer be under supervision of the United States government. The X-Men arrive in Hammer Bay, and examines the aftermath of the destruction the civil war has caused upon the once prosperous city. A few miles away, Sersi and Exodus fight to a stalemate, and the Black Knight and War Machine intervenes to stop Sersi from causing more damage. Beneath the Citadel, Jean, Quicksilver, and the Scarlet Witch meets with Crystal. Cortez appears, and holds Luna as a human shield. Scarlet Witch attempts to attack, but Quicksilver stops her, knowing Cortez will want one of them to react so Luna will die. Exodus arrives, and threatens to kill Cortez for the latter betraying Magneto, whilst Cortez begs the makeshift heroes to save him from Exodus.

=== Part V: "Of Kith and Kin" ===
Inside the Helicarrier, Nick Fury shows footage of Genosha's deteriorating state to the West Coast Avengers, with the Black Widow sadly admits that prayer is all they have right now. In Genosha, a force field is erected around the country to ensure no more involvement with outsiders. Below the Citadel, Exodus seemingly kills Cortez and takes Luna hostage in the process. The X-Men and the Avengers meet up and decide to find and take down Exodus. After Storm and War Machine unsuccessfully break down the barrier, Professor X sends an urgent telepathic message to the two teams. The X-Men and Avengers arrive to help Professor X, Beast, Gyrich, and U.S. Agent vanquish the Genoshan Magistrates and their reinforcements. As they tend to the wounded, Exodus comes and reveals his plan to ultimately destroy Genosha. He proclaims he is only heir to be Magneto's only successor, and that to ensure it happens, he will kill the X-Men and anyone else that opposed his leader's dream of mutant supremacy. After Exodus orders the Mutates to kill the two teams or the island will be crushed by the force field, The X-Men and Avengers engage in an all out battle with the Mutates. After holding them back, Professor X launches a psychic attack on Exodus, allowing the Black Knight to knock him down and save Luna. A weakened Exodus unleashes a powerful attack on Quicksilver and leaves for Avalon. With Quicksilver near death, the Black Knight resuscitates his teammate's husband via CPR, giving Quicksilver life again. The morning after the crisis, Captain America and Professor X talk and wonder about the future of relations between humans and mutants.

== Aftermath ==
One of the lasting effects of Bloodties was that the Avengers ceased to operate under a United Nations mandate. A second lasting effect was that it led to the official dissolution of the West Coast branch of the Avengers, until its revival by Hawkeyes Clint Barton and Kate Bishop, and the initial formation of the team Force Works.

== Collected editions ==
The storyline was collected as a trade paperback in 1995 (ISBN 0-7851-0103-9). In 2012 was collected as a hardcover (ISBN 0-7851-6127-9).

== Reading order ==
- Part I: Avengers (vol. 1) #368 (1993)
- Part II: X-Men (vol. 1) #26 (1993)
- Part III: Avengers West Coast #101 (1993)
- Part IV: Uncanny X-Men #307 (1993)
- Part V: Avengers (vol. 1) #369 (1993)
