= Eppo Doeve =

Dutch painter

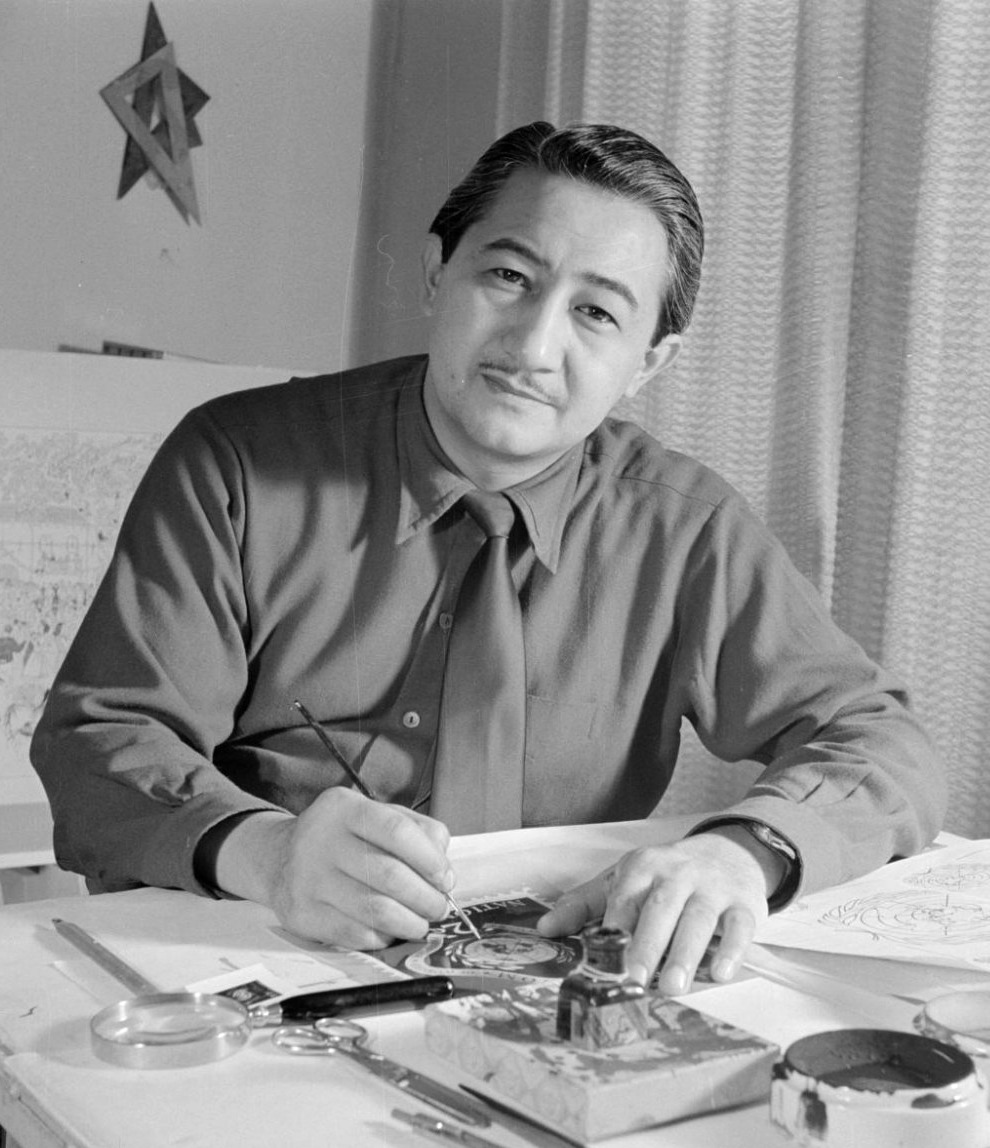
- Eppo Doeve in December 1951
- Born: Joseph Ferdinand Doeve; 2 July 1907; Bandung, Dutch East Indies
- Died: 11 June 1981 (aged 73)
- Known for: Painting, cartoons
- Awards: Knight of the Order of Orange-Nassau (1973)

Joseph Ferdinand Doeve (2 July 1907 – 11 June 1981), better known as Eppo Doeve, was a popular Dutch painter and cartoonist of Indo descent. He was born in Bandung, Indonesia and moved to the Netherlands in 1927. He was invested as a Knight of the Order of Orange Nassau in 1973.

His cartoons were mostly published in Elsevier Weekblad and later in Elsevier Magazine.

He also drew two newspaper comics, Mannetje Bagatel (1946) and Kleine Isar, de Vierde Koning (1962), both with text by novelist Bertus Aafjes. Doeve was additionally active in advertising illustration.
