= X-Men 2099 =

Comic book series

Publication information
- Publisher: Marvel Comics
- Schedule: Monthly
- Format: Ongoing series
- Publication date: October 1993 – August 1996
- No. of issues: 35
- Main character(s): Bloodhawk; Cerebra; Junkpile; Krystalin; La Lunatica; Meanstreak; Metalhead; Serpentina; Sham; Skullfire; Desert Ghost

Creative team
- Created by: John Francis Moore; Ron Lim

X-Men 2099 is a comic book series published by Marvel Comics from 1993 to 1996 that chronicled the adventures of an X-Men team in the year 2099. It extends the Marvel 2099 imprint, which features other future versions of popular Marvel characters, such as Spider-Man 2099 and Hulk 2099. The series was written by John Francis Moore and largely pencilled by Ron Lim.

== Publication history ==
The series began in October 1993 and lasted 35 issues along with two specials. It spawned a line of action figures, mostly featuring the more popular characters in the book. In issue #20, the title received a minor makeover, officially joining the 2099 imprint and changing its name to X-Men 2099 A.D., the "A.D." standing for "After Doom". At the series' end, it was folded into 2099: World of Tomorrow, though members of the team were rarely seen after that point.

The first issue featured a blue foil cover on cardstock and the double-sized 25th issue's cover was extra-glossy with foil letters, metallic silver ink, and embossed characters on a heavier wraparound cover.

In June 2009, a mini-series called Timestorm 2009–2099 brought back Spider-Man, Ghost Rider, the X-Men, and more from the 2099 universe in a very different version.

In 2016, the original version returned in the Spider-Man 2099 arc "Civil War 2099" (also appearing in the X-Men '92 series). Later the team appeared again in X-Men Blue, helping the original time displaced X-Men.

== Characters ==
=== Main ===
The team featured an ever-changing line-up, but the mainstays included:

- Desert Ghost (Xi'an Chi Xan) – Founder. His right hand was green and covered in scales, and endowed with the ability to break down the molecular structures of substances, thus destroying them; his left hand appeared to be solid gold and had the ability to repair molecular structures, although his use of this power was taxing. He also had the power to generate a protective cocoon, while regenerating and healing. Xi'an was formerly a member of the Lawless gang, who later defected to the Theatre of Pain.
- Skullfire (Timothy "Fitz" Fitzgerald) – Leader. Initial electrical energy absorption and redirection later developed into absorption and redirection of any energy source; ambient, magical, or otherwise.
- Bloodhawk (Lemuel Krug) – Able to assume a superhuman form at will that included tough, scale-like red skin, sharp talons, and leathery wings. Never a permanent member of the team, but came and went when needed.
- Meanstreak (Henri Huang) – Superspeed and a heightened metabolism to prevent his speed from adversely affecting his body. Former Alchemax researcher and star scientist.
- Metalhead (Edward van Beethoven-Osako) – His skin could take on the properties of any metal he came into contact with. Metalhead lost ability to return to human skin due to a mutation caused by the touch of Freakshow member Contagion.
- Cerebra (Shakti Haddad) – Able to psionically "read" and manipulate the nervous systems of others, allowing her to sense the unique bio-signatures of other mutants and control or disable the brain functions of living beings. She could use her power to trigger the latent powers of other mutants.
- Krystalin (Ruth Kirsten Porter-Ogada) – Pulls minerals out of the air and condenses them into hard crystalline shapes of any design she could imagine.
- Junkpile – Techno-organic metabolism increases his strength and durability and allows him to telekinetically draw metallic objects to himself and use them to rebuild his body or add to his physical mass making him unusually resistant to harm. Former member of the Lawless gang. Betrayed team in the second issue, but was later appointed to the new S.H.I.E.L.D. by President Doom.
- La Lunatica – La Lunatica is a psychic vampire who feeds on dark emotions, increasing her strength and durability. Initially an instrument of the Theatre of Pain, but after her release fell in love with Skullfire and reformed to become a member of the X-Men.
- Serpentina (Kimberly Kristine Potters) – Negation field renders her bones, tissue, and muscles pliant so that she can stretch them to extended lengths. Killed during first story arc (issue #3). Body was reanimated later in series as a zombie (issue #26).
- Sham (Diamanda LaSalle) – Bends nearby light particles and sound waves into powerful and convincing audio/visual illusions. Joined after she was liberated from the Theatre of Pain.

=== Antagonists ===
- Aesir – Pantheon of false Asgardian gods created by Alchemax.
- Brimstone Love and the Theatre of Pain.
- Controller X – Xi'an Chi Xan while working for the Theatre of Pain.
- The Foolkiller – An assassin charged with the task of killing members of the Lawless. Raised and trained to believe that foolish behavior should be punishable by death.
- Free Radicals – A group that clashed with the Neo-Wakandan natives of northern California, particularly Oakland.
- Glitterspike – Professional assassin and abusive ex-husband of Freakshow member Rosa. Has the ability to absorb light particles and convert them into tangible objects of light.
- Graverobber and the Undead – A mutant who once worked for Shakti's father, Zail Haddad. Subjected to radioactive and biohazardous conditions, he developed the mutant ability to resurrect the dead, but those he resurrected are linked to his neural energies.
- The Rat Pack – Casino enforcers for Synge Casino.
- Lytton and Desdemona Synge – Owners of the Synge casino. Lytton framed Xi'an for his father's murder.
- Joaquim Eduardo Vasquez (also known as Darkson) – Son of Rosa Vasquez and Glitterspike.
- Vulcann – Member of the Shaper's Guild known as the Bloodsmiths.
- Master Zhao and the Chosen (One-Eyed Jack, Psycho-K, Wingspan, Frostbite, and Monster) – Zhao was the last leader of the last true succession of X-Men. He took drugs to enhance his dwindling psychic energies, and as a result grew demented. He eventually killed the last of the X-Men, and used genetic experiments to attempt to raise and develop a new generation of X-Men with abilities similar to Xavier's team.

=== Supporting ===
- Book – Possesses mutated rock body and high intelligence.
- Broken Haiku – Former member of the Lawless. Left for dead by Xi'an, but survived. Lived as an entity tied to the digital world. Hunted down by the Foolkiller.
- Zail Haddad – Father of Cerebra.
- Halloween Jack (Jordan Boone, also known as Loki)
- The Driver – A man who worked with Mama Hurricane. Stored digital copies of mutants in his car's computer systems to protect them from persecution. Became ill when Junkpile corrupted his car; seemingly destroyed the copies and now drives for the sake of driving. Powers: Cyberpathy, techo-organic body, link with car grants him other powers.
- Quiver – A prisoner released from the Theatre of Pain along with Sham, but never officially joined the team. Had the ability to generate seismic pulses.
- Morphine Somers – Superannuation touch generates specific bioelectric feedback through matter, aging it thousands of years into dust. Minister of Mutant Affairs and Bureaucratic Head of Halo City under the Doom presidency. Becomes temporary leader of the X-Men in Xi'an's place. Member of Doom's Black Cabinet.
- Victor Ten Eagles – Former member of the Lawless.
- Rosalinda Navarro Vasquez – Member of Freakshow who fell in love with Metalhead. Powers: electrical disruption.
- X-Nation
- The Freakshow – A group of humans who were experimented upon by mega-corps, making them similar to mutants. Under the leadership of Mama Hurricane, an important figure in the MUR (Mutant Underground Railroad), they move from place to place just doing what they can to help.
  - Breakdown – Rosa's younger brother who has destruction powers akin to Xi'an.
  - Contagion – Emits a deadly disease through physical contact. Infected Metalhead during a skirmish.
  - Dominic – Boy engineered with the ability to generate and withstand extreme heat.
  - Psyclone – Psychic or wind blasts.
  - Tantrum – Deadly vocal cords. Power increases with her level of rage.

== Creators ==
=== Creative teams ===
The series was written entirely by John Francis Moore and pencilled almost exclusively by Ron Lim. Exceptions are as follows:

- Issue #21 – Cover by Tim Sale.
- Issue #28 – Cover by Chris Sprouse, part of a set of interlocking covers that form one image.
- Issue #32 – Cover by Humberto Ramos, pencilled by Jan Duursema.
- Issue #33–35 – Pencilled by Jan Duursema.
- X-Men 2099 A.D. Special #1 – Contains three stories: "Tin Man," pencilled and inked by Steve Pugh; "Sally and Sylvester Stay at Home," pencilled and inked by Graham Higgins; and "The Frog Prince," written by Matthew Morra, pencilled by J. Calafiore, and inked by Peter Palmiotti.
- X-Men 2099 Oasis – One-shot illustrated by Greg and Tim Hildebrandt.

=== Inkers ===
- Adam Kubert – Issues #1–3
- An extended run by Harry Candelario.

== Alternate versions ==
=== Timestorm 2009–2099 ===
In the alternate universe of Timestorm 2009–2099, the X-Men 2099 are introduced in a one-shot by Brian Reed and Frazer Irving. In this timeline, they are based in a former mutant internment camp in Maryland, and are led by a bald, one-armed future incarnation of Wolverine. The other members are Meanstreak (now a young girl), Krystalin, Junkpile (now a self-replicating Stark android), and Bloodhawk (now female, and with a touch that "can give life, or take it", similar to Xi'an). They are trying to rebuild Baltimore, which was destroyed in a war, and must defend it against an army of mindless Hulks.

=== Uncanny X-Men Annual #1 ===
When the time traveling mutant Tempus ends up in the year 2099, she meets a new version of X-Men 2099 consisting of Desert Ghost, Skullfire, Meanstreak, Metalhead, Serpentina & Sham. In this alternate future Magik is also the Sorcerer Supreme of 2099.

== Collected editions ==
Title	Material collected	Published date	ISBN
X-Men 2099 Vol. 1	X-Men 2099 #1-9	May 2009	978-0785139652
Timestorm 2009/2099	Timestorm 2009/2099: X-Men #1 and Timestorm 2009/2099: Spider-Man #1, Timestorm 2009/2099 #1-4,	November 2009	978-0785139225

== In other media ==
- Toy Biz released two waves of X-Men 2099 figures, in 1995 and 1996.
