= Doom 2099 =

Comic book character

- Cover to Doom 2099 #1 (January 1993). Art by Pat Broderick.

Publication information
- Publisher: Marvel Comics
- First appearance: Marvel Comics Presents #118 (December 1992)
- Created by: John Francis Moore; Pat Broderick

In-story information
- Alter ego: Victor Von Doom
- Species: Human Cyborg
- Place of origin: Marvel 2099 (Earth-928)
- Team affiliations: Zefiro Gypsies; Ministry of Doom; S.H.I.E.L.D. 2099
- Notable aliases: Doctor Doom; Erik Czerny; All-Father Doom
- Abilities: Genius-level intellect; Command of magic; Nano-active blood; Cyberpathy; Accelerated healing; Powered armor grants: Superhuman strength and durability; Flight via rocket pack; Invisibility; Temporary intangibility; Force field generation; Energy projection via gauntlets; Wide array of sensors and scanners

Doom 2099 is an American comic book series published by Marvel Comics, featuring the fictional anti-hero Doom, aka Victor Von Doom. Created by writer John Francis Moore and artist Pat Broderick, the character first appeared in the Doom 2099 #1 (January 1993) as part of the publisher's Marvel 2099 line of books set in the far future. The character was based on the character Dr. Doom, which was created by Stan Lee and Jack Kirby in 1962. Moore wrote the series for its first two years, while its third and final year featured stories written by Warren Ellis.

== Publication history ==
Doom first appeared in Marvel Comics Presents #118, in a preview of Doom 2099 #1. Doom 2099 would run for 44 issues (January 1993 – August 1996), with Doom making notable appearances in 2099 Unlimited, 2099: World of Tomorrow, Ghost Rider 2099, Hulk 2099, Punisher 2099, Ravage 2099, Spider-Man 2099, and X-Men 2099. Doom also received his own special one-shot after conquering the United States, titled 2099 A.D. This was followed by the one-shot 2099 Special: The World of Doom (May 1995) with creator profiles and background articles and a 10-page fictional prose piece, "The Code of Citizen Conduct of the United States."

== Fictional character biography ==
In the year 2099, Doctor Doom abruptly materializes via an energy sphere in the ruins of Castle Doom in Latveria, after disappearing 50–100 years before. Latveria is now in the hands of a cyborg mercenary robber baron named Tyger Wylde. Doom confronts the new dictator of the nation, but is quickly defeated by Wylde's superior technology — his armor is destroyed and his face is scarred. Left for dead, Doom finds refuge with the last remnants of his Romani community, the Zefiro, via the seeress Fortune. With the aid of Pixel Corporation employee Celia Quinones, who he freed from slavery, Doom creates an upgraded armor capable of competing with Wylde. Doom becomes a freedom fighter, and successfully strikes back against Wylde. Doom is able to defeat and destroy Wylde and regain control of his homeland to once again become monarch of Latveria. Doom then decides that the world has become chaotic and corrupt, and to save it, he must conquer it. Doom is assisted by several Zefiro Romani:

- Fortune, a Zefiro fortune teller and former advisor of Wylde.
- Wire, a "Cybersavant", capable of finding information on the worldwide Cyberweb.
- Xandra, Wire's girlfriend and a Wakandan soldier. Adopted into the Zefiro.
- Vox, the Zefiro's magical adept. A mute boy who has one of the Eyes of Agamotto.
- Poet, Fortune's former lover and capable martial artist, not a Zefiro.

=== One Nation Under Doom ===
Doom sets out to conquer the United States, but has lost several of his allies: Wire's body had died, though his mind lived on in cyberspace; Poet died battling drug-traders; and Xandra had left to train in Wakanda. Doom conquers the United States and leaves Fortune as regent of Latveria. As president, Doom fought against Alchemax, the Pixel Corporation, and the other corporations who controlled all aspects of everyday life in 2099. Doom recreates S.H.I.E.L.D., assigning Junkpile to take down the Red Market (illegal trade in humans for experimentation). He also makes the X-Men 2099 the law enforcers of Halo City, a place where mutants and humans can live in peace.

=== Rage Against Time ===
Doom returns to Myridia, the world's source of information, hoping to find a way to save Latveria. He travels back to the 20th century, battling his own present day self, as well as Daredevil and Namor. Despite this, he successfully introduces an addictive crab venom to his country, leading the populace to develop an immunity to the necrotoxin in an effort to save his people in the future. He returns to 2099 to find that Fortune and about 50% of the population of Latveria have survived due to their immunity, though many of them had been mutated into creatures dubbed "mutalocos". Immediately upon his return, Doom is greeted by the Phalanx, who had returned to Earth to attempt assimilation of the human race again. Against the advice of Fortune's brother, Kaz, Doom agrees to aid the Phalanx in finding sleeper agents they had left on the planet to have a better chance at assimilation.

=== 2099: World of Tomorrow ===
Doom allies with Magus, the emissary of the Phalanx, assisting him in finding the scout which contains a code that will begin the Phalanx assimilation. In reality, Doom has been experimenting on humans with the help of Xina Kwan, former lover of Miguel O'Hara, to find a way of purging the techno-organic virus. Spider-Man eventually arrives and Doom blackmails him into assisting their experiments, claiming to be in possession of Miguel's brother. Magus reveals he has known all along where the scout, Nostromo of X-Nation, has been and that contact is at hand. Miguel and Xina successfully introduce and purge the virus from Doom's neurotech armor. He claims that he had always intended to allow the Phalanx to find Nostromo, as the techno-organic growth has purged his country of outside influences and the ravages of the past century. As Spider-Man is about to destroy Nostromo, Doom activates a code he had implanted in the scout years prior, allowing Nostromo to purge the Phalanx from Earth. Doom is destroyed along with Magus and with his final will names Nostromo heir to the throne of Latveria.

=== Ragnarok Now ===
Doom is shown searching for a way to prevent the Timestream from collapsing after it is damaged by the efforts of the Earth-616 version of the Red Skull. As reality begins to unravel around him, Doom is rescued by Kang the Conqueror, who recruits him as part of a larger plot against the Apocalypse Twins.

== The Black Cabinet ==
When Doom conquered the United States, he gathered his Black Cabinet, a group of talented and unique individuals:

- Minister of Signal - Indigo Eshun, a brilliant British "Netglider" and head of an elite Cadre of Netgliders. Wire's body was rebuilt and he was Doom's instant link to the Indigo and her Netgliders, though he had become insane and would commit suicide shortly afterwards. Indigo was killed during Herod's coup.
- Minister of Enemy Relations - Nkrumah, a Wakandan mercenary and head of Panther's Rage, a group of elite warriors. Xandra was one of his Panthers.
- Minister of Humanity - Morphine Somers, a mutant activist with the power to age anything he touched thousands of years in mere seconds.
- Minister of Order - Sharp Blue, head of the Guild of Elite mercenaries.
- Minister of Punishment - Jacob Gallows, Punisher 2099, also made head of S.H.I.E.L.D. 2099.

== Powers and abilities ==
After his defeat by Tyger Wylde, Doom underwent special surgery: nanotechnology was neuro-cybernetically added to the nervous system, speeding up those motor responses, allowing him to interface directly with any technology and heal himself from serious injuries. Due to his fragmented memory, Doom's mystical abilities were drastically decreased. Therefore, Doom had to rely on Vox for his natural talents. With his memory restored, he has full access to them again. Doom possesses extensive knowledge of all sciences, as well as is an expert in robotics, trans-Einsteinian physics, genetic engineering, military technology, chronophysics, biochemistry, and other fields.

=== Equipment ===
Doom wears an adamantium-lanxide laced armor over cybermesh circuitry, enabling tactile interface with nanoids in his brain and bloodstream that he designed with the help from Celia Quinones. It provides him with new capabilities such as increased strength and durability, a rocket pack for flying, phasing (thanks to the phase shifter linked into his armor's systems), protective force fields, cloaking, and gauntlet particle blasters. His armor also possesses numerous sensors and scanner systems.

== Collected editions ==
Title	Material collected	Published date	ISBN
Spider-Man 2099 Classic Vol. 3	Doom 2099 #14 and Spider-Man 2099 (vol. 1)#15–22, Ravage 2099 #15, X-Men 2099 #5, Punisher 2099 #13	February 2015	978-0785193029
Doom 2099: The Complete Collection by Warren Ellis	Doom 2099 (vol. 1) # 24–39, and material from 2099: The World Of Doom #1	April 2013	978-0785167549
Amazing Spider-Man 2099 Companion	Doom 2099 (vol. 2) #1 and Spider-Man 2099 (vol. 4) #1, 2099 Alpha #1, Conan 2099 #1, Fantastic Four 2099 (vol. 2) #1, Ghost Rider 2099 (vol. 2) #1, The Punisher 2099 (vol. 3) #1, Venom 2099 #1, 2099 Omega #1	August 2020	978-1302924928
Fantastic Four/Doom 2099 Omnibus	Doom 2099 (1993) #1–24, 25 (A and C stories), 26-44, 2099 A.D. Apocalypse #1, Fantastic Four 2099 (1996) #1–8, Fantastic Four (1961) #413; material from 2099 Unlimited (1993) #5–8, 2099 A.D. Genesis #1, 2099 Special: World of Doom (1995) #1	June 2025	978-1302964153

== Other versions ==
=== Exiles ===
In the series Exiles, Doom offers the Proteus-possessed Hulk a safe haven in Latveria. After Proteus decides to leave, Jordan Boone (the creator of the "Virtual Unreality" portal that Proteus traveled through) is fired from Alchemax, but Doom, intrigued by the thought of inter-dimensional travel, offers Boone a new job. While the original 2099 imprint is known as Earth-928 in the Marvel Multiverse, this event causes a divergent timeline known as Earth-2992.

=== Timestorm 2009–2099 ===
Victor Von Doom appears in the Timestorm mini-series that returns to the 2099 universe. In this mini-series he is an aged version of his original universe self that has sustained the world from disaster and has pulled the 2009 versions of Spider-Man and Wolverine into 2099 as his life is nearing an end.

=== Marvel Knights 2099 ===
Doctor Doom appears in Marvel Knights: 2099, which features an alternate take on the 2099 universe. Doom seizes the body of his majordomo Lucien to ensure his survival and leads an invasion of Wakanda for months until a young council member named K'Shamba fights back. K'Shamba assumes the mantle of the Black Panther and destroys the rest of the army, seemingly stopping Doom's plans. However, K'Shamba unknowingly becomes Doom's puppet.

=== Ultron-dominated 2099 ===
In Savage Avengers, an unidentified Earth has its 2099 dominated by Deathloks led by a variation of Ultron who has taken the name "Deathlok Prime". Doom 2099 is introduced as an inmate at Hellrock Prison before he is freed by a time-displaced Dagger and offered to join the Avengers.

=== Earth-2099 ===
In the new future of 2099 launched in 2099 Alpha, an alternate Reed Richards appears as Doctor Doom. Richards has had his memories intertwined with those of Victor von Doon, making him believe himself to be Doom.

=== One World Under Doom ===
An alternate universe iteration of Doom 2099 appears in the "One World Under Doom". He travels to the present alongside Bishop, Cosmic Ghost Rider, Deathlok, Maestro, Old Man Logan, and Phoenix in an attempt to make the present-day Doctor Doom relinquish his position as Sorcerer Supreme. They are all defeated by Doom and sent back to their own time.
