= Bertus Aafjes =

Dutch poet and writer

- Born: Lambertus Jacobus Johannes Aafjes; May 12, 1914; Amsterdam, Netherlands
- Died: April 22, 1993 (aged 78); Swolgen, Netherlands
- Occupation: Poet
- Writing career
- Language: Dutch

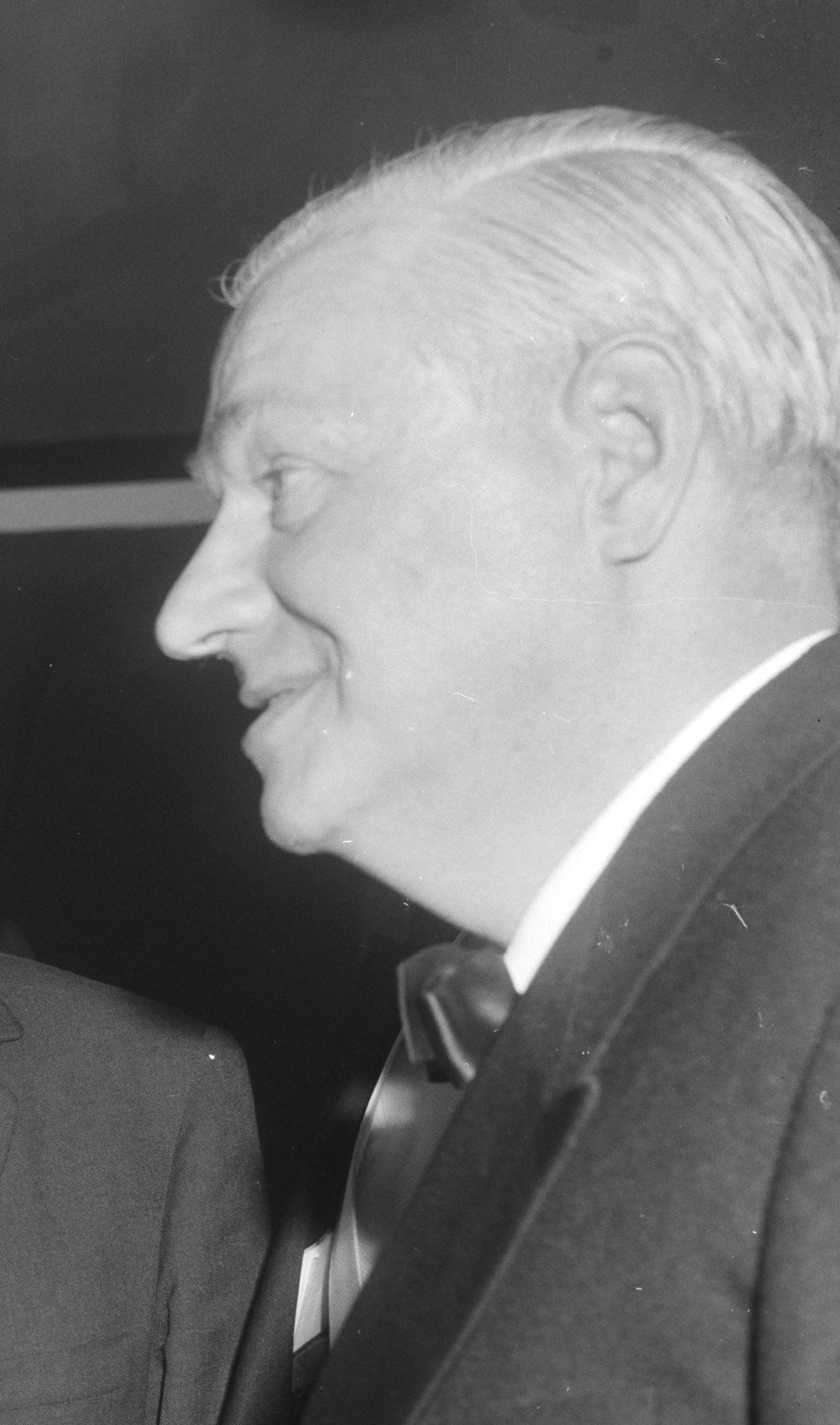
Bertus Aafjes (1965)

Lambertus Jacobus Johannes "Bertus" Aafjes (May 12, 1914 – April 22, 1993) was a Dutch poet noteworthy for his poems about resistance to German occupation during World War II.

Aafjes was born in Amsterdam, married and was the father of 3 daughters and 1 son. He died in Swolgen.

Aafjes wrote a five-book series featuring Japanese samurai Ōoka Tadasuke. His work is marked by his devout Catholicism, but he also scripted the comics Mannetje Bagatel (1946) and Kleine Isar, de Vierde Koning (1962) for Eppo Doeve , as well as Peter-kersen-eter (1943) and De Vrolijke Vaderlandse Geschiedenis (1948) for Piet Worm.

== Bibliography ==
- 1936: Het Italiaanse Maria-lied, in: De Gemeenschap
- 1940: Het gevecht met de muze
- 1941: Amoureus liedje in de morgenstond
- 1941: Het zanduur van de dood, in: Helicon
- 1942: Een laars vol rozen, reisverslag
- 1943: Gerrit Achterberg, de dichter van de sarcofaag. Aantekeningen bij zijn poëzie
- 1943: Peter-Kersen-eter
- 1943: De ark
- 1944: Per slot van rekening
- 1944: Omne animal
- 1944: Elf sonnetten op Friesland
- 1944: Verzen en vrouwen
- 1944: De laatste brief
- 1944: Kleine catechismus der poëzie
- 1944: Bid, kindje, bid!
- 1945: Boeren. Open brief van het land
- 1945: Lafaard of geus?
- 1945: Dichters van later tijd
- 1945: In het Atrium der Vestalinnen, fragmenten
- 1945: In het Atrium der Vestalinnen en andere fragmenten
- 1946: Bevrijdingsdag
- 1946: Een voetreis naar Rome
- 1946: Maria Sibylla Merian, gedicht
- 1946: De zeemeerminnen
- 1947: Gedichten
- 1947: Douderideine
- 1948: De vogelvis
- 1948: Het koningsgraf. Honderd en een sonnetten
- 1948: De driekoningen
- 1948: Laat nu al wat Neerland heet
- 1948: Circus
- 1948: Egyptische brieven
- 1949: In den beginne
- 1949: De lyrische schoolmeester, gedicht
- 1949: Het kinderkerstboek
- 1949: De reis van Sinte Brandaan, herdicht door Bertus Aafjes
- 1950: Arenlezer achter de maaiers. Kronieken over kleine maar vergeten bijzonderheden in het Oude en het Nieuwe Testament
- 1952: Vorstin der landschappen. Een reis door het Heilige Land
- 1953: De karavaan
- 1953: Drie essays over experimentele poëzie
- 1954: Morgen bloeien de abrikozen, roman
- 1955: De blinde harpenaar. De liefde, het leven, het geloof en de dood in de poëzie der oude Egyptenaren
- 1956: Logboek voor 'Dolle Dinsdag'
- 1957: Capriccio Italiano. Een reisboek over Italië
- 1958: De vrolijke vaderlandse geschiedenis. Deel I. Van de Batavieren tot de Gouden Eeuw
- 1958: De vrolijke vaderlandse geschiedenis. Deel II. Van de Gouden Eeuw tot nu
- 1959: Het Troje van het Carboon
- 1959: Goden en eilanden, een reisboek over Griekenland
- 1959: De wereld is een wonder, reisverslag
- 1960: Het Hemelsblauw
- 1960: Dag van gramschap in Pompeji
- 1960: In de schone Helena, reisverslag
- 1961: Levende poppen
- 1961: De dikke en de dunne
- 1961: Anneke's avontuur
- 1961: De verborgen schat
- 1961: Muziek op het kasteel
- 1961: Tante Ibeltje
- 1961: De schippersjongen
- 1961: Stuurman Roel
- 1961: De lachende krokodil
- 1961: De geheimzinnige diamant
- 1962: De Italiaanse postkoets, verhalenbundel
- 1962: Odysseus in Italië, reisverslag
- 1963: De fazant op de klokkentoren
- 1963: Omnibus, prozafragmenten
- 1963: Kleine Isar, de vierde koning, stripverhaal
- 1965: Het gevecht met de Muze, verhalenbundel
- 1965: Dooltocht van een Griekse held, reisverslag
- 1967: Per en Petra en het geheim van de bouwkunst
- 1967: Maria Sibylla Merian en andere gedichten
- 1967: Drie van Bertus Aafjes, gedichten
- 1968: De denker in het riet
- 1968: Die te Amsterdam vaak zei: Jeruzalem
- 1969: Een ladder tegen een wolk
- 1969: De rechter onder de magnolia
- 1969: Kito en Poelika
- 1969: Kito vindt Poelika
- 1971: De koelte van de pauwenveer, verhalen
- 1971: Mijn ogen staan scheef. Zwerftochten door het land van de Mikado
- 1973: Een lampion voor een blinde of De zaak van de Hollandse heelmeesters, verhalen ("Boekenweekgeschenk")
- 1973: De vertrapte pioenroos
- 1974: De laatste faun
- 1976: Limburg, dierbaar oord
- 1976: In de Nederlanden zingt de tijd
- 1979: Het rozewonder
- 1979: Mei, mengelwerk
- 1979: Deus sive Natura
- 1980: Rijmpjes en versjes uit de vrolijke doos
- 1980: Tussen schriftgeleerden en piramiden
- 1981: Drie gedichten over Amsterdam
- 1982: Rechter Ooka-mysteries
- 1983: Homeros' Odyssee en Dooltocht van een Griekse held, reisverslag
- 1984: Zeventien aforismen
- 1984: De wereld is een wonder, reisverhalen uit twaalf landen
- 1985: De val van Icarus
- 1986: De mysterieuze rechter Ooka. Japanse speurdersverhalen
- 1987: De sneeuw van weleer, autobiografie
- 1987: Het hemd van een gelukkig mens. Sprookjes uit een verre wereld, jeugdboek
- 1990: Verzamelde gedichten 1939-1988
- 1990: De sprookjesverkoper. Sprookjes van heinde en verre
- 1991: Griekse kusten, reisverhalen
- 1992: De eeuwige stad. Rome in verhalen en herinneringen
- 1992: De zee, gedichten
- 1992: De parels
