= Riders of the Range (comic strip) =

Cartoon strip series in the Eagle comic

Riders of the Range was a series of strip cartoons in the British comic, Eagle. It was created by Charles Chilton. The artists who drew this series were Jack Daniel, Angus Scott, Frank Humphris and Ferdinando Tacconi.

== Plot ==
The heroes of the series, set the American Old West, were straight-talking and straight-shooting Jeff Arnold and his companion, the older, gruff Luke. Inseparable partners, the righted wrongs throughout the territory. Once, they very publicly fell out with each other, in order to flush out a gun-for-hire.

== History ==
The series began as a radio broadcast in 1949.
