= Fantasy Anime Comics Toys Space =

Belgian speculative fiction convention

- Status: Active
- Genre: Speculative fiction
- Location: Ghent
- Country: Belgium
- Inaugurated: 1993
- Organizer: Con-Fuse bvba
- Website: http://www.facts.be/

FACTS or F.A.C.T.S. (Fantasy Animation Comics Toys Sciencefiction) is a Belgian speculative fiction convention.

Launched in 1993 in Ghent, it has grown over the years and now welcomes over 30,000 visitors at each edition. From 1998 until 2008 the F.A.C.T.S. convention was held at the I.C.C. in Ghent, Belgium. The 2009 edition took place at Flanders Expo for the first time and has been expending there ever since. The convention currently covers more than 24,000 sq. m.. FACTS was created by Emmanuel Van Melkebeke and three of his friends.
