= Punisher 2099 =

1993–1995 Marvel comic book series

- Punisher 2099 #1

Publication information
- Publisher: Marvel Comics
- First appearance: The Punisher 2099 #1 (February 1993)
- Created by: Pat Mills; Tony Skinner; Tom Morgan (based upon the original character by Gerry Conway, Ross Andru, and John Romita, Sr.)

In-story information
- Alter ego: Jacob "Jake" Gallows
- Place of origin: Marvel 2099 (Earth-928)
- Team affiliations: Church of Thor; S.H.I.E.L.D. 2099; Public Eye Police Force
- Partnerships: Doom 2099
- Notable aliases: Minister of Punishment
- Abilities: Trained combatant; Expert marksman and driver; Cybernetic suit grants: Enhanced strength, durability, agility, and reflexes; Identity concealment via Face Scrambler; Program uploading
The Punisher 2099
Publication information
- Schedule: Monthly
- Format: Ongoing
- Publication date: February 1993 – November 1995
- No. of issues: 34
- Main character: Punisher 2099
Creative team
- Written by: Pat Mills; Tony Skinner; Chuck Dixon
- Artist(s): Tom Morgan; Simon Coleby

The Punisher 2099 is a comic book series following the account of Jake Gallows (the Punisher) in the year 2099 in an alternate Marvel Universe. The majority of the issues were written by Pat Mills and Tony Skinner, with art by Tom Morgan. The rest were written by Chuck Dixon. The series ran from February 1993 through November 1995 with a total of 34 issues.

== Fictional character biography ==
Jacob Gallows is a member of the Public Eye Police Force, a private police protection service owned by Alchemax, and the Church of Thor. Gallows's mother, brother, and sister-in-law are killed on the orders of Kron Stone. After recovering, Gallows comes across the original Punisher's war journal, stolen from the archives of the Public Eye. The last page states "You who find this, I charge you to carry on my work." Soon after, Gallows becomes the new Punisher and apparently kills Stone.

Gallows kills rogue organ-thieves, those who track down and steal organs from unwilling victims. He tries to protect those who cannot afford their police subscriptions and are ignored. Conversely, he also goes after those who use their money to get away with crimes. Gallows deals with a technologically minded partner named Matt Axel, and struggles with the uncaring attitudes of his bosses and colleagues towards the poor and the attention of a police psychiatrist who believes Gallows is up to something.

For a time, Gallows establishes a prison underneath his house, as all regular prisons have been abolished. Occasionally, he sentences prisoners to death in a molecular destabilizer if he felt their crimes truly horrific. However, Gallows ponders the merits of such a facility. After a carefully planned breakout, most of the prisoners are killed.

Unlike his predecessor, Gallows is unwilling to kill corrupt police officers, no matter how heinous their crimes. In one instance, he refuses after several officers try to kill him with a cyborg gladiator. After Gallows manages to kill the gladiator, the officers attempt to kill Gallows themselves. He hides, refusing to fire, but his suit is overridden by Matt Axel, who kills the cops. Axel would be involved with several more incidents with the Punisher, sometimes teaming up with others to help him.

Gallows becomes the premiere law enforcer under Doom's presidential administration as head of the Ministry of Punishment. He creates a new police force with wide-ranging powers, enforcing curfews. Matt Axel joins up with the Punisher again, working out of his mobile base. Axel later quits on the spot after believing Gallows has gone too far in employing thought-crime devices.

Gallows later confronts an alternate reality version of himself who is much more brutal. Gallows is killed by the Wave Spiders of Herod after Herod gives an order to kill superheroes as part of his overthrowing of Doom's presidency.

During the "Spider-Verse" storyline, Gallows is revealed to have survived. Spider-Man 2099 contacts Gallows when he and Lady Spider travel to 2099 A.D. in order to dissect the clone body of the Inheritor Daemos.

During the third Contest of Champions, Gallows is revealed to be the mysterious summoner for the Grandmaster's team. During the final battle, Gallows is killed by an alternate reality version of the original Punisher, who states that he never authorized Gallows to wear his symbol.

== Skills and abilities ==
Jake Gallows is an athletic man with no superpowers. As a Public Eye Officer, Gallows received police training in all forms of combat, as well as proficiency in marksmanship and driving.

=== Equipment ===
He is also a weapon specialist, collecting most of the best weaponry in his timeline, including smart-targeting grenazers, a plasma gas cannon, and flame sticks. Additionally, he carries some notable firearms from the past, such as a Smith & Wesson .54-caliber Magnum handgun (2015 vintage) and Stark-Fujikawa .48-caliber Street Pacifier. His key weapon is the "power bat" which can vary in density sets from hard rubber to titanium, either injure or kill an opponent. Gallows kept this setting at "soft rubber" as default, a precaution which saves his life on at least one point.

Gallows wears a suit of cybernetic armor built from "heat sink" materials and equipped with multiple technological devices ("face-scrambler" circuitry to avoid detection by many security cameras on the city streets, bio-synergetic capacities for programming with different fighting techniques or styles, turbo kickboots, microwave sensors, and a computer trajectory mapping system). This armor covers his own exo-muscular undersuit that amplifies strength, durability, agility, and reflexes to superhuman levels.

He uses a super-sonic motorcycle for transportation, the H.D. Stealth Stinger 5. This unique motorcycle could run at 800 mph (1,300 km/h) speeds and also equipped with an air screen, city traffic system override capability, sound bafflers, inertia brakes, various weaponry, projectile holo-beams, and a wrap-around camouflage system enabling functional invisibility. He also uses the Black Ambulance, capable of preventing prisoner escapes via security support systems.

== Other versions ==
=== Marvel Knights 2099 ===
An alternate universe version of Punisher 2099 appears in the Marvel Knights imprint. This version is Cossandra Natchios, the daughter of Frank Castle and Elektra Natchios, who became the Punisher upon the death of her father. After Natchios learns that she has incurable cancer, she trains her teenage son Franklin to succeed her as the Punisher. However, Franklin is a pacifist and refuses to become the next Punisher.

=== Timestorm 2009-2099 ===
An alternate universe version of Jake Gallows appears in "Timestorm". This version is an officer working under Tyler Stone. Gallows becomes unhinged when his wife and child are killed by his fellow police officers, who he does not recognize. Later on, Stone sends Gallows to the past to neutralize superheroes and manipulate time for the benefit of Alchemax. However, Gallows rebels when hearing Stone speak ill of Thor. In a rage, he attacks Stone, with the two killing each other in the ensuing battle.

=== Deathlok-dominated future ===
An alternate universe version of Jake Gallows appears in Savage Avengers. This version originates from a universe dominated by Deathloks and is part of a resistance against them

== Collected editions ==
Title	Material collected	Published date	ISBN
Spider-Man 2099 Classic Vol. 3	Punisher 2099 #13 (vol. 1) and Spider-Man 2099 (vol. 1)#15–22, Ravage 2099 #15, X-Men 2099 #5, Doom 2099 #14	February 2015	978-0785193029
Marvel Knights 2099	Punisher 2099 (vol. 2) #1 and Daredevil 2099 #1, Black Panther 2099 #1, Inhumans 2099 #1, Mutant 2099 #1	January 2005	978-0785116134
Amazing Spider-Man 2099 Companion	The Punisher 2099 (vol. 3) #1 and Spider-Man 2099 (vol. 4) #1, 2099 Alpha #1, Conan 2099 #1, Doom 2099 (vol. 2) #1, Fantastic Four 2099 (vol. 2) #1, Ghost Rider 2099 (vol. 2) #1, Venom 2099 #1, 2099 Omega #1	August 2020	978-1302924928
