= Marvel 2099 =

Marvel Comics imprint

- Variant cover art to Spider-Man 2099 vol. 3 #4 (December 2015). Art by Pasqual Ferry

Publication information
- Schedule: Varied
- Formats: Varied
- Original language: English
- Genre: Superhero
- Publication date: 1992–1998

Marvel 2099 was a Marvel Comics imprint, started in 1992, that was originally about one possible future of the Marvel Universe, but later revealed to be the Earth of the main Marvel continuity in the distant future. It was originally announced by Stan Lee in his "Stan's Soapbox" column as a single series titled The Marvel World of Tomorrow, which was being developed by Lee and John Byrne. This later changed to a line of books under the banner Marvel 2093 (the date being one hundred years from the year in which the titles launched) before finally being published as Marvel 2099.

Three of the initial four titles launched—Doom 2099, Punisher 2099, and Spider-Man 2099—starred futuristic takes on pre-existing characters. The fourth, Ravage 2099, featured an all-new superhero, scripted for several months by Stan Lee. The 2099 line soon expanded to include 2099 Unlimited, Fantastic Four 2099, Ghost Rider 2099, Hulk 2099, X-Men 2099, and X-Nation 2099. While it has been confirmed to be a possible future version of Earth-616, the mainstream Marvel Universe, the 2099 universe has been officially designated as Earth-928 and alternatively dubbed as Earth-616 circa 2099, or simply Earth-2099.

== Publication history ==
The initial universe began with Spider-Man 2099, Ravage 2099, Doom 2099, and Punisher 2099 being launched in subsequent months. Peter David wrote Spider-Man for the bulk of the series, and it was consistently the most popular series. It satirized corporations, with Spider-Man constantly clashing with Alchemax, which employed him in his secret identity. Stan Lee wrote the first eight issues of Ravage as an extremely political story about corruption, corporate pollution, and the environment. After Lee left, he was replaced by a series of writers. In 1993, Wizard reported that the 2099 line had "gone over fairly well with the fans".

=== Growth and decline ===
Fans requested further titles, and Marvel provided X-Men 2099. They also introduced a Hulk 2099 in the series 2099 Unlimited, which featured occasional Spider-Man 2099 stories, as well as early work by Warren Ellis. The comics had a strong degree of interconnectivity that was similar to comics published by Marvel in the 1960s due to the imprint's editor Joey Cavalieri. The only cross-title crossover within the 2099 universe, The Fall of the Hammer, detailed a plot by the corporations to technologically recreate the Norse pantheon, along with a new Thor, to distract attention from the anti-corporate superheroes.

The 2099 series expanded to include Ghost Rider 2099, about a hero whose consciousness had been downloaded into a robotic body. Hulk 2099 was also given a brief chance at his own series. As sales began to flag on all titles besides Spider-Man and X-Men, Marvel commissioned ideas from various writers, including a proposal by Grant Morrison and Mark Millar, before accepting Warren Ellis's idea that Doom 2099, revealed to be, in fact, Victor Von Doom, would take over the United States. Each title had the modifier "A.D." ("After Doom") added on the logo to reflect the change. The new storyline allowed Marvel to cancel several low-selling titles (Hulk, Ravage, and The Punisher). The in-universe reason for the heroes' deaths was President Rogers (an impostor Captain America who was instated after Doom was violently ousted from office) ordered the execution of the super heroes, including Punisher, Hulk and a handful of low-tier heroes who had appeared in 2099 Unlimited.

In 1996, when Marvel, during a cost-cutting exercise, fired Cavalieri, many of the 2099 creators (including Peter David and Warren Ellis) quit the line in protest. With the line floundering, two additional titles were launched: X-Nation 2099, a spin-off of X-Men 2099, and Fantastic Four 2099, which featured characters who were apparently the present day Fantastic Four accidentally sent into the future.

Around this time, Doom 2099 became the only 2099 comic to crossover with a present-day Marvel comic when he traveled back to 1996 and met Daredevil, the Fantastic Four, and Namor in a story partially told in Fantastic Four #413. Spider-Man 2099 met the original Spider-Man in a special one-shot issue, making them the only characters to meet their counterparts.

=== End of the imprint ===
After sales slumped, the 2099 titles were canceled and replaced by 2099: World of Tomorrow, a single title featuring the surviving characters from all the titles. The series lasted only eight issues before being canceled.

The 2099 line was concluded with a one-shot, 2099: Manifest Destiny (March 1998), in which Captain America was found in suspended animation and, with Miguel O'Hara, assembled various 2099 heroes into a new team of Avengers. The story summarized the years from 2099 to 3099, with humanity transforming the corporate world of 2099 into a utopia and then expanding into space.

=== Subsequent appearances ===
The 2099 world has been seen occasionally since, most notably in Peter David's "Future Tense" storyline in Captain Marvel, which revisited both Spider-Man 2099 and the alternate future of the Maestro that David created in The Incredible Hulk: Future Imperfect, explaining a plot point which had been left dangling since David had abruptly left Spider-Man 2099.

In 2004, writer Robert Kirkman wrote a series of one-shot comics for the fifth anniversary of the Marvel Knights imprint, under the heading Marvel Knights 2099. The future portrayed in this series is unconnected to the original 2099 Universe, which included a different Punisher 2099.

In 2005, the Official Handbook of the Marvel Universe one-shot designated the Earth of 2099 as Earth-928, with Marvel Knights 2099 designated as Earth-2992. A cover of a second printing from the Spider-Man storyline "The Other: Evolve or Die" features Miguel O'Hara / Spider-Man 2099.

In 2006, the Exiles visited the Marvel Universe 2099 in Exiles #75-76 as part of the "World Tour" arc. This future split from the mainstream 2099 fairly early, as Doom 2099 had not yet met Spider-Man 2099. Spider-Man 2099 joined the Exiles and left with them.

In 2009 Marvel published miniseries "Timestorm 2009–2099", crossing the current Marvel Universe with yet another alternate version of 2099. The Spider-Man 2099 of this reality is a teenager.

In 2013, Spider-Man 2099 became trapped in the mainstream Marvel Universe in The Superior Spider-Man. In 2014 he would star in an ongoing series and become involved in the "Spider-Verse" storyline, along with numerous other alternate reality Spider-Men. Notably the Spider-Men 2099s of the "Exiles" and "Timestorm 2009–2099" series are killed during this event. At the end of this storyline, the 2099 timeline has been altered.

The 2099 universe is involved in the 2015 storyline "Secret Wars".

In 2016, a storyline in Deadpool debuted the 2099 versions of Deadpool, a moniker shared by Wade's daughters, Warda Wilson (his daughter with Shiklah) and Ellie Camacho. The storyline also reveals that Wade Wilson and Iron Fist are still alive in this time period, as they work with Ellie and Wade's ally Emily Preston to stop Warda's war on the city as she attempts to find out what happened to her mother.

In 2019 in Amazing Spider-Man #25, Dr. Connors is giving a lecture on the negligence of the world and environment due to focus on the countless occurrences of superhero activity will end up negatively impacting the future, to the point of catastrophe. Meanwhile, set to his lecture, strange weather phenomenon is occurring above a burning oil rig. A rift opens in the sky and a figure falls out of it, landing on the dock of the rig. The workers un-bury the figure, revealing an unconscious Spider-Man 2099. There was later a series of one-shots to celebrate the 25th anniversary of Marvel 2099. It incorporated the ongoing storyline from Amazing Spider-Man that not only reintroduced Spider-Man 2099, Fantastic Four 2099, Doom 2099, Punisher 2099, and Venom 2099 in individual one-shot issues, but also introduced Conan 2099. Ulana the Watcher narrated that this reality of Earth-2099 is a combination of Earth-928 and the other Marvel 2099 realities which have been rewoven together.

== Setting ==
The world of 2099 is a cyberpunk dystopia (similar to the world of Blade Runner). North America is a corporate police state ruled by a few huge megacorporations, most notably Alchemax, which owns the private police force the Public Eye (which primarily punishes criminals' bank accounts). There were, prior to the launch of the comics, no active superheroes in this world and the previous heroes are mythologized through religion as with the Church of Thor. The present-day Marvel continuity is referred to as an "Age of Heroes" that abruptly ended in a catastrophe a century before that also set back society. This catastrophe was averted in the present when Miguel O'Hara—Spider-Man 2099—temporarily swapped places with his past self shortly before the cataclysm, turning Miguel's world into an alternate future of the Marvel Universe rather than the future.

=== Card system ===
In the 2099 Universe, the monetary currency system uses implants commonly known as cards, which are credit ID implants. There are aluminum cards, gold cards, and platinum cards. Another type of card are black cards, which give the owner unlimited funds and law immunity.

There is also a status known as "decred", which denies access to many public places, such as hospitals, hypermarkets, and shopping malls.

== Characters ==
This section contains the characters from each of the 2099 realities:

=== Heroes ===
==== Protagonists ====
- Doom (Victor Von Doom)
- Ghost Rider (Zero Cochrane)
- Hulk (John Eisenhart)
- Punisher (Jake Gallows)
- Ravage (Paul-Phillip Ravage)
- Spider-Man (Miguel O'Hara)

===== X-Men 2099 =====
- Bloodhawk (Lemuel Krugg)
- Cerebra (Shakti Haddad)
- Junkpile
- Krystalin (Krystalin Porter Ogada)
- La Lunatica
- Meanstreak (Henri Huang)
- Metalhead (Eddie Van Beethoven-Osako)
- Serpentina (Kimberly Potters)
- Skullfire (Timothy Sean Michael Fitzgerald)
- Desert Ghost (Xi'an Chi Xan)

===== X-Nation 2099 =====
- Cerebra (Shakti Haddad)
- Clarion (Hayes Isaacs)
- December (December Frost)
- Metalsmith
- Nostromo
- Twilight
- Uproar
- Willow
- Wulff

===== Fantastic Four 2099 =====
- Human Torch (clone of Johnny Storm)
- Invisible Woman (clone of Sue Storm)
- Mister Fantastic (clone of Reed Richards)
- Thing (clone of Ben Grimm)

===== Other heroes =====
- Matt Axel (the Punisher's armorer)
- Barrio Man
- Captain America (imposter posing as Steve Rogers)
- Daredevil 2099 (there were two different versions of this Daredevil)
  - Daredevil (Samuel Fisk)
  - Daredevil (Eric Nelson)
- Doctor Apollo (Dr. Nikolai Apolonio)
- Freakshow
  - Mama Hurricane
  - Breakdown
  - Rosa
  - Metalhead
  - Psyclone
  - Contagion
  - Tantrum
  - Dominic
- Galahad, a human connected to robot
- The Ghostworks
- Goldheart
- Lachryma 2099
- The Lawless
  - Xi'an Chi Xan
  - Victor Ten Eagles
  - Junkpile
  - Broken Haiku
  - Mongrel
  - Auntie Maim
  - Reverend
- Metalscream 2099
- Moon Knight 2099
- Net Prophet (John Roger Tensen, also known as Justice)
- S.H.I.E.L.D. 2099
- Steel Rain
- Thor 2099 (Reverend Cecil McAdams)
- Vendetta
- Hazzard 2099
- Duke Stratosphere
- Captain America 2099 (Roberta Mendez, debuts in Secret Wars 2099 and appears in Spider-Man 2099 volume 3)
- Black Widow 2099 (Tania)
- Hawkeye 2099 (Max)
- Iron Man 2099 (Sonny Frisco)
- Deadpool 2099 (There are two who share this moniker)
  - Deadpool (Warda Wilson)
  - Deadpool/Zenpool (Ellie Camacho)
- Wade Wilson
- Roman the Sub-Mariner
- Strange 2099
- Relur
- Iron Fist 2099
- Phastos
- Black Widow 2098
- Frankenstein's Monster 2099
- Grey Hulk 2099
- Red Hulk 2099 (Ross Romero)

=== Villains ===
- Adonai (leader of LA "locusts")
- False Aesir (Thor/Cecil McAdams, Hela/Tiana, Loki/Jordan Boone, Balder, Heimdall)
- Anti-Hulk
- The Architect (Ryu Kobolt)
- Avatarr (CEO of Alchemax; secretly an alien)
- Brimstone Love and the Theatre of Pain
- Cabal
  - Patriot/Galactic Goblin
  - Bruto Olafsen
  - Manfredi
  - Carnage
  - Chief Woland
  - Crossbones
- Captain America (an impostor posing as Steve Rogers)
- Coda
- Dethstryk and the Mutroids of Hellrock
- Discord
- Draco
- Exodus
- Fearmaster (Darryl King)
- Fever
- Flipside
- Glitterspike
- Gearbox
- Goblin
- The Golden One
- Halloween Jack (Jordan Boone, also known as Loki; later traveled to the present in X-Force #92)
- Heartbreaker
- Anderthorp Henton (Director-General of ECO)
- Hotwire (Dean Gallows, son of Jake Gallows)
- Multi-Fractor/Jigsaw
- Dyson Kellerman (CEO of Transverse City Security)
- L-Cypher
- Major Jones
- Master Zhao and the Chosen (One-Eyed Jack, Psycho-K, Frostbite, Wingspan, and Monster)
- Masters of Evil 2099
  - Black Knight
  - Baron Zemo
  - Enchantress
  - Melter
  - Radioactive Man
- The Norns of the Theatre of Pain (Felicity, Bliss, Euphoria)
- Public Enemy (Saber Hagen)
- The Rat Pack (the Dealer, the Suicide Master, Mister Entertainment)
- Sandwoman
- Scorpion (Kron Stone from the "Timestorm 2009–2099" reality)
- The Shadow Dancer
- Sinister Six 2099
  - Doctor Octopus 2099 (an Atlantean with octopus tentacles)
  - Goblin
  - Electro 2099
  - Sandwoman
  - A Venom
  - Vulture 2099
- The Specialist
- Tyler Stone (dictator of Latveria in 2099 and former employee of Alchemax)
- The Synge Family (Noah, Lytton, and Desdemona)
- Technarchy/Phalanx
- Thanatos (Aaron Delgado possessed by an alternate-reality version of Rick Jones)
- Tiger Wylde
- Travesty
- Vengeance 2099
- Venom (there are two known Venom 2099 versions)
  - Venom (Kron Stone)
  - Venom (Alea Bell)
- Venture (Queeg)

=== Mega-corporations ===
- Alchemax (CEO Avatarr; VP Tyler Stone) and its subsidiaries
  - ECO Corp. (CEO Ravage; Director-General Anderthorp Henton)
  - Public Eye (Director Fearmaster)
  - R&D Department (Director Tyler Stone; employees include Miguel O'Hara, Jordan Boone, and Aaron Delgado)
- Cyber-Nostra (controlled by Fearmaster)
- D/MONIX (Data Manipulation and Organization Networks) (CEO Dyson Kellerman; employees include Harrison Cochrane [Ghost Rider's father])
- Greater Nevada Syndicate (controlled by the Synge Family)
- Green Globe PLC (founded by the Ravage family)
- Ninja-Nostra
- Stark-Fujikawa (formerly Stark Enterprises) (CEO Hikaru-sama)
- Synthia (CEO Darrius Rush; employees include Mannix Dunn, Dana D'Angelo [Spider-Man's fiancée], Alain Gris [Group Manager for Sky Plantations])

=== Marvel Knights 2099 heroes ===
- Black Panther (K'Shamba)
- Daredevil (Samuel Fisk)
- The Inhumans
- Mutant 2099 (Chad Channing)
- Punisher (Cassondra Castle)

== 2099 series and one-shots ==
Title	Issues	Date	Collected in
2099 A.D.	1	1995, May	
2099 A.D. Apocalypse	1	1995, December	Fantastic Four/Doom 2009 Omnibus
2099 A.D. Genesis	1	1996, January	Fantastic Four/Doom 2009 Omnibus (material from)
2099 Alpha	1	2020, January	Amazing Spider-Man: 2099 Companion
2099 Limited (Ashcan)	1	1993	
2099 Manifest Destiny	1	1998, March	
2099 Omega	1	2020, February	Amazing Spider-Man: 2099 Companion
2099 Sketchbook	1	1993, September	
2099 Unlimited	10	1993, July – 1995, October 1995	Material from #1-3, 8-10: Spider-Man 2099 Omnibus Vol 2 Material from #5-8: Fantastic Four/Doom 2009 Omnibus
2099 World of Doom Special	1	1995, May	Fantastic Four/Doom 2009 Omnibus
2099 World of Tomorrow	8	1996, September – 1997, April	
Annihilation 2099	5	2024, July	Annihilation 2099 TPB
Black Panther 2099	1	2004, September	Marvel Knights 2099 TPB
Conan 2099	1	2020, January	Amazing Spider-Man: 2099 Companion
Conquest 2099	5	2024, October - December	Conquest 2099 TPB
Daredevil 2099	1	2004, September	Marvel Knights 2099 TPB
Deadpool 2099	4	2016, January - 2017, January	Deadpool 2099 TPB
Doom 2099	44	1993, January – 1996, August	Fantastic Four/Doom 2009 Omnibus (#25 only A and C stories collected)
Doom 2099 (vol. 2)	1	2020, February	Amazing Spider-Man: 2099 Companion
Doom 2099: Rage of Doom	1	2026, April	
Doomed 2099	1	2025, July	
Fantastic Four 2099	8	1996, January – August	Fantastic Four/Doom 2009 Omnibus
Fantastic Four 2099 (vol. 2)	1	2020, January	Amazing Spider-Man: 2099 Companion
Ghost Rider 2099	25	1994, May – 1996, May	Ghost Rider 2099 Omnibus
Ghost Rider 2099 (vol. 2)	1	2020, February	Amazing Spider-Man: 2099 Companion
Hulk 2099	10	1994, December – 1995, September	
Inhumans 2099	1	2004, September	Marvel Knights 2099 TPB
Miguel O'Hara - Spider-Man 2099	5	2024, January	Miguel O'Hara - Spider-Man 2099 TPB
Mutant 2099	1	2004, September	Marvel Knights 2099 TPB
Punisher 2099	34	1993, February – 1995, November	
Punisher 2099 (vol. 2)	1	2004, September	Marvel Knights 2099 TPB
Punisher 2099 (vol. 3)	1	2020, January	Amazing Spider-Man: 2099 Companion
Ravage 2099	33	1992, December – 1995, August	
Secret Wars 2099	5	2015, May - 2015, September	Spider-Man 2099 Omnibus Vol 2
Spider-Man 2099	46	1992, November – 1996, August	Spider-Man 2099 Omnibus Vol 1
Spider-Man 2099 (vol. 2)	12	2014, July – 2015, June	Spider-Man 2099 Omnibus Vol 2
Spider-Man 2099 (vol. 3)	25	2015, October – 2017, July	Spider-Man 2099 Omnibus Vol 2
Spider-Man 2099 (vol. 4)	1	2020, February	Amazing Spider-Man: 2099 Companion
Spider-Man 2099 Annual	1	1994	Spider-Man 2099 Omnibus Vol 1
Spider-Man 2099 Meets Spider-Man	1	1995, November	Spider-Man 2099 Omnibus Vol 1
Spider-Man 2099 Special	1	1995, November	Spider-Man 2099 Omnibus Vol 1
Spider-Man 2099: Dark Genesis	5	2023, May	Spider-Man 2099: Dark Genesis TPB
Spider-Man 2099: Exodus	5	2022, May – August	Spider-Man 2099: Exodus TPB
Spider-Man 2099: Exodus Alpha	1	2022, May	Spider-Man 2099: Exodus TPB
Spider-Man 2099: Exodus Omega	1	2022, September	Spider-Man 2099: Exodus TPB
Symbiote Spider-Man 2099	5	2024, March - July	Symbiote Spider-Man 2099 TPB
The End 2099	5	2025, December - 2026, April	The End 2099 TPB
Timestorm 2009/2099	4	2009, October - December	Timestorm 2009/2099 TPB
Timestorm 2009/2099 Spider-Man One-Shot	1	2009, June	Timestorm 2009/2099 TPB
Timestorm 2009/2099: X-Men One-Shot	1	2009, June	Timestorm 2009/2099 TPB
Venom 2099	1	2020, February	Amazing Spider-Man: 2099 Companion
X-Men 2099	35	1993, October – 1996, August	X-Men 2099 Omnibus
X-Men 2099 Special	1	1995, October	X-Men 2099 Omnibus
X-Men 2099: Oasis	1	1996, August	X-Men 2099 Omnibus
X-Nation 2099	6	1996, March – August	X-Men 2099 Omnibus

== In other media ==
=== Television ===
- An original incarnation of Iron Man 2099 appears in a self-titled episode of Iron Man: Armored Adventures, voiced by an uncredited actor. This version is Andros Stark, grandson of Tony Stark who travels back in time to kill him before he can create an A.I. called "Vortex", which goes on to kill most of humanity. Along the way, he allies himself with Justin Hammer, who is reputed as a hero by 2099. Andros eventually succeeds in killing Tony, but the latter infects his armor with an advanced virus. Realizing it will evolve into Vortex, Andros travels back in time to stop himself, successfully changing history at the cost of his existence.
- Spider-Man 2099 and Earth-928 appear in the Ultimate Spider-Man episode "The Spider-Verse: Part 1", with Spider-Man 2099 voiced by Freddy Rodriguez. Additionally, a 2099-inspired incarnation of J. Jonah Jameson (voiced by J.K. Simmons) appears as well.
- A cyborg descendant of Heinrich and Helmut Zemo from 2099 makes a minor appearance in the Avengers Assemble episode "The House of Zemo", voiced by an uncredited actor.

=== Film ===
- Spider-Man 2099 and Earth-928 make cameo appearances in the post-credits scene of Spider-Man: Into the Spider-Verse, with Spider-Man 2099 voiced by Oscar Isaac.
- Spider-Man 2099, Nueva York, and Earth-928 appear in Spider-Man: Across the Spider-Verse, with Spider-Man 2099 voiced again by Oscar Isaac.
- Warda Wilson / Deadpool 2099 makes a non-speaking cameo appearance in Deadpool & Wolverine as a member of the Deadpool Corps.

=== Video games ===
- A planned video game adaptation called Marvel 2099: One Nation Under Doom was heavily promoted, but ultimately never commercially released.
- Spider-Man 2099's suit appears as an unlockable alternate skin in Spider-Man (2000), Spider-Man 2: Enter Electro, the Wii version of Spider-Man: Web of Shadows, The Amazing Spider-Man, The Amazing Spider-Man 2, Spider-Man (2018), and Spider-Man 2 (2023).
- Ghost Rider 2099 appears as an unlockable skin in Ghost Rider and a downloadable alternate skin in Ultimate Marvel vs. Capcom 3.
- Spider-Man 2099, Alchemax, and Earth-928 appear in Spider-Man: Shattered Dimensions, with Spider-Man 2099 voiced by Dan Gilvezan. Additionally, 2099 incarnations of the Hobgoblin, Kron Stone / Scorpion, and Doctor Octopus appear as bosses while Flipside appears as an alternate skin for Spider-Man 2099. Furthermore, the 2099 incarnation of Vulture and a 2099-inspired incarnation of Silvermane appear in the Nintendo DS version of the game.
- Spider-Man 2099, Alchemax, Nueva York, and Earth-928 appear in Spider-Man: Edge of Time, with Spider-Man 2099 voiced by Christopher Daniel Barnes. Additionally, 2099 incarnations of Black Cat and Peter Parker appear as bosses in the Activision versions of the game while 2099 incarnations of Arcade, Big Wheel, and Overdrive appear in the Nintendo DS version.
- Human Torch 2099 and Hulk 2099 appear as alternate skins in Marvel Heroes.
- Several Spider-Man 2099-related characters appear as playable characters and bosses in Spider-Man Unlimited. Additionally, Nueva York appears as a stage.
- Spider-Man 2099, Captain America 2099, Black Widow 2099, and Iron Man 2099 appear as playable characters in Marvel Future Fight.
- Spider-Man 2099 and Punisher 2099 appear as playable characters in Marvel Contest of Champions. These versions come from a 2099 ruled by Hydra. Additionally, a 2099 incarnation of original character Guillotine also appears.
- Spider-Man 2099, Captain America 2099, and Ghost Rider 2099 appear in Marvel Avengers Academy.
- Spider-Man 2099, Captain America 2099, Hulk 2099, Goblin 2099, Electro 2099, and Venom 2099 appear as playable characters in Lego Marvel Super Heroes 2. Additionally, Kang the Conqueror uses Nueva York and Earth-928 as components while creating Chronopolis.
- Tokyo 2099 appears as a stage in Marvel Rivals. Additionally, its iteration of Peni Parker is depicted as being from 2099 instead of the 31st century like the comic book incarnation.

== See also ==
- Marvel Comics multiverse
- Timestorm 2009–2099
