= Hulk 2099 =

- Cover to 2099 Unlimited #3 (Jan. 1994). Art by J.J. Birch.

Publication information
- Publisher: Marvel Comics
- First appearance: 2099 Unlimited #1 (Sept. 1993)
- Created by: Gerard Jones; Dwayne Turner (based upon the original character by Stan Lee and Jack Kirby)

In-story information
- Alter ego: John Eisenhart
- Species: Human mutate
- Place of origin: Marvel 2099 (Earth-928)
- Team affiliations: Lotusland Productions; The Defenders 2099
- Abilities: Transformation; Superhuman strength, stamina, durability, speed, and leaping; Accelerated healing; Razor sharp fangs and claws; Prehensile tongue

Hulk 2099 (John Eisenhart) is a fictional character appearing in American comic books published by Marvel Comics. The character was created by Gerard Jones and Dwayne Turner and first appeared in 2099 Unlimited #1. As with many other Marvel 2099 characters, Hulk 2099 was a futuristic re-imagining of the original Hulk.

== Publication history ==
Hulk 2099's first regular appearances were in 2099 Unlimited #1–6, as one of several different stories in the anthology. The character later starred in his own series, Hulk 2099, which ran for 10 issues (starting in Dec. 1994). After the series ended, the character was one of several heroes killed in the 2099 A.D. Apocalypse one-shot, which concluded the "One Nation Under Doom" storyline and changed the Marvel 2099 setting.

A version of the character later appeared in the comic book series Exiles, where he is possessed by Proteus. A further reimagining of the character as a pack of feral gamma-powered creatures appeared in Timestorm 2009–2099.

== Fictional character biography ==
John Eisenhart is a studio executive for Lotusland Productions, researching the Knights of Banner, migrant worshipers of the Hulk. The Knights of Banner had been experimenting with gamma rays, hoping to create a new Hulk. After the Knights refuse to sell their story to him, Eisenhart reports them to the police. As the police arrive, a battle ensues, leading to many of the Knights being captured or killed. Eisenhart, wracked with guilt, joins the Knights in their fight. A young Knight Eisenhart had befriended named Gawain tries to end the violence by setting off the gamma devices, only for Eisenhart to be caught in the blast. The blast transforms Eisenhart into a new Hulk, who quickly ends the battle. Upon returning to Lotusland, Eisenhart is assigned to investigate the Hulk, with no one knowing his identity.

During his investigation, Eisenhart meets a singer/songwriter named Quirk. She joins Eisenhart in his search for Gawain, who had been captured during the initial battle. The Hulk deals with multiple foes, while Eisenhart has to deal with the backstabbing at his workplace. This plot lasts for the duration of the Hulk's 2099 Unlimited appearances, with Gawain eventually being rescued.

Gawain is killed by the villain Draco at the start of the Hulk 2099 series, fueling Eisenhart/Hulk with guilt and remorse throughout the rest of the series over his broken vow to protect Gawain. The Hulk is later killed by forces of S.H.I.E.L.D.

== Other versions ==
=== Exiles ===
After being resurrected and escaping the House of M universe, Proteus possesses the body of Hulk 2099, looking for a suitable host body that will not expire quickly due to his vast energy. Although powerful, the Hulk's body is not enough to sustain Proteus, who moves on to possessing Morph. The appearance of Proteus in 2099 creates a divergent timeline that is later identified as Earth-6375 in the multiverse.

=== Timestorm 2009–2099 ===
In Timestorm 2009–2099, the Hulk of 2099 is a species of mutant creatures that were created when a gamma bomb was dropped on Washington, D.C., mutating all residents there and reducing the city to a desert wasteland.

=== Secret Wars 2099 ===
During the Secret Wars storyline, a variation of the original Hulk 2099 (John Eisenhart) resides in the Battleworld domain of 2099. He is a member of the Defenders 2099.

=== Earth-2099 ===
On the unified 2099 reality of Earth-2099, Hulk is recruited by Moon Knight to join the New Avengers after the Avengers were killed by the Masters of Evil.

== Powers and abilities ==
The Hulk 2099 is one of the strongest beings in his future timeline. Like the original, he possesses immeasurable strength, stamina, durability, speed, and healing, as well as the ability to leap great heights (he could easily leap hundreds of feet in height or miles while in an enraged state). His strength would increase due to anger. John Eisenhart can willingly transform himself into the Hulk 2099, the process adds 5' 9" in size and 1,423 lbs to his mass. Unlike his predecessor, this Hulk has natural weapons, which he utilizes for combat, such as tearing through steel. He was a skilled attorney and formidable unarmed combatant.

== Personality ==
The most distinctive contrast of the Hulk 2099 was his psyche. Initially, when he turns into the Hulk, Eisenhart retained his intellect and personality (although significantly more aggressive, due possibly to his current emotional stress). He is able to control his transformations at will. However, they developed two alternate personalities: Eisenhart ruthless, while the Hulk heroic. As the mental separation became farther distant, these changes would only occur during moments of rage.

== In other media ==
Hulk 2099 appears in Lego Marvel Super Heroes 2.
