= 1992 in comics =

Notable events of 1992 in comics.

== Events and publications ==
=== January ===
- Adventures of Captain America #4, the final issue of the limited series (Marvel)

=== February ===
- Captain Confederacy vol. 2, #4, the final issue of the limited series (Epic Comics)
- Jan Bucquoy is sued by Hergé's estate for making a pornographic parody of Tintin titled La Vie Sexuelle de Tintin. He later wins his case.
- Gli occhi di uno sconosciuto (An unknown's eyes) – by Michele Medda and Stefano Casini (Nathan Never series; Bonelli).

=== March ===
- March 24: The final issue of the iconic British satirical magazine Punch, which was renowned for its cartoons, is published. It will be briefly revived between 1996 and 2002.
- Batman #475: Introduction of Renee Montoya.
- Hook #4, the final issue of the bi-weekly mini-series (Marvel)
- Partita con la morte (Playing with Death) – by Claudio Chiaverotti and Corrado Rold (Dylan Dog series ; Bonelli).
- Inferno – by Bepi Vigna and Claudio Bastianon (Nathan Never series, Bonelli)..

=== April ===
- Scott McCloud's Understanding Comics is first prepublished.
- The Amazing Spider-Man #361: First full appearance of Carnage.
- Fanteria dello spazio (Starship troopers) – by Antonio Serra and Roberto De Angelis (Nathan Never series; Bonelli).

=== May ===
- Captain America #400: 80-page giant; double gatefold cover; flip-book with a reprint of Avengers #4 (Silver Age re-introduction of Captain America) on the opposite side.
- Uncanny X-Men #300: 68-page giant featuring "Legacies," by Scott Lobdell, John Romita Jr., and Dan Green.
- Namor the Sub-Mariner #26 (May cover date) – Jae Lee makes his Marvel Comics' debut.
- First issue of Zona X (Bonelli).

=== June ===
- The first edition of the bi-annual Dutch comics festival Stripdagen Haarlem is organized in Haarlem by Joost Pollmann.

=== July ===
- The French satirical comics magazine Charlie Hebdo is relaunched.
- Amazing Heroes, the long-running industry magazine published by Fantagraphics, folds after 203 issues.
- Introduction of James Rhodes as War Machine in Iron Man #282.
- Adventures of the Thing #4, the final issue of the mini-series featuring reprints from Marvel Two-In-One (Marvel)
- Defenders of Dynatron City #6, the final issue of the video game adaptation (Marvel)

=== August ===
- Savage Sword of Conan #200: "Barbarians of the Border," by Roy Thomas, John Buscema, and Ernie Chan.
- The Amazing Spider-Man #365: Special 30th Anniversary issue with a hologram on the cover. A backup story, "I Remember Gwen" drawn by John Romita
- The Pirates of Dark Water #9, the final issue of the Hanna-Barbera fantasy animated series adaptation (Marvel)

=== September ===
- September 23: in Spirou, first chapter of L'or du Rhin, by Roger Leloup.
- Peter Laird founds the Xeric Foundation, which awards self-published grants to comics creators.
- With #37, Legends of the Dark Knight changes its title to Batman: Legends of the Dark Knight.
- In The sandman, first chapter of Brief lives by Neil Gaiman and Jill Thompson (DC comics)
- Cops: The Job #4, the final issue of the mini-series (Marvel)

=== October ===
- October 9:
  - In The Netherlands a judge decides that Robert Anker's parody novel De Thuiskomst van Kapitein Rob is copyright infringement of Pieter J. Kuhn's comic strip Kapitein Rob. The book is banned and publisher Querido has to pay a fine to Kuhn's family members.
  - The Words & Pictures Museum of Fine Sequential Art, founded by Kevin Eastman, opens its doors in Northampton, Massachusetts.
- October 15: During the Stripdagen Hein de Kort wins the Stripschapprijs. Comics collector, publisher and store owner Hans Matla and his wife Franny win the Jaarprijs voor Bijzondere Verdienste (nowadays the P. Hans Frankfurtherprijs).
- October 23: Comics artist Marten Toonder receives the Tollensprijs for his contributions to the Dutch language.
- Batman: Sword of Azrael #1: Introduction of Azrael, who would later become Batman during the Knightfall storyline.
- Dinosaurs, a Celebration #4, the final issue of the mini-series (Marvel)
- Warlock vol. 2, #6, the final issue of the limited series (Marvel)
- Orgoglio navajo (Navajo pride) by Claudio Nizzi and Giovanni Ticci; the origin of the friendship between Tex Willer and Tiger Jack is told for the first time (Bonelli).
- La fine del mondo (The end of the world) – by Tiziano Sclavi, Alfredo Castelli and Giovanni Freghieri; second and last team-up between Dyland Dog and Martin Mystere (Bonelli).

=== November ===
- November 18: In Superman #75 Superman dies, seemingly permanently. The news attracts a lot of media coverage outside the comics world.
- November 21: The final issue of the British comics magazine The Victor is published.
- November 24: Sonic the Hedgehog mini series #0, by Archie Comics, is released. A demo print, #¼, was released earlier.
- Cable—Blood and Metal #2, the final issue of the limited series (Marvel)
- Infinity War #6, the final issue of the limited series (Marvel)
- Il lungo addio (The long goodbye) by Tiziano Sclavi and Carlo Ambrosini, an anomalous Dylan Dog story, with an intimate tone and without horror elements (Bonelli).
- L'abisso delle mente (Memories' abyss) by Michele Medda and Nicola Mari; the Nathan Never's past is revealed. (Bonelli).

=== December ===
- The Incredible Hulk reaches issue #400 (December cover date). The Hulk battles the Leader.
- The Punisher/Captain America: Blood and Glory #3, the final issue of the limited series (Marvel)

=== Specific date unknown ===
- Zep's comic series Titeuf makes its debut.
- New publishers Black Eye Productions, African Prince Productions, Defiant Comics, Approbation Comics, Full Bleed Studios, and Image Comics (including WildStorm and Top Cow Productions) enter the marketplace; Image explodes onto the scene, releasing eight ongoing and limited series, starting with Youngblood in April; followed by Spawn in May; Savage Dragon in July; and Brigade, Shadowhawk, and WildC.A.T.S. in August.
- Time Warner companies decided to drop the word "Inc.", including DC Comics.
- Terry Willers and Martyn Turner establish the annual Guinness International Cartoon Festival in Rathdrum, County Wicklow, Ireland.
- In Finland, the first episode of Juha Vuorma's newspaper comic Kaapuveikko appears in print.

== Births ==
=== October ===
- October 22: Ruth Redmond, Irish-born Canadian comic book artist.

=== December ===
- December 24: Giuseppe Durato, Italian manga artist based in Japan

== Deaths ==
=== January ===
- January 8: Aubrey Collette, Sri Lankese comics artist and cartoonist (Sun Tan, the Asian Sensation), dies at age 81.
- January 15: Walter Clinton, American animator and comics artist (Hanna-Barbera comics), died at age 85.
- January 25: Guido Buzzelli, Italian comics artist (Angélique), dies at age 64.
- January 27: Jacques Devos, Belgian comics artist (Victor Sébastopol, Génial Olivier), died at age 67.

=== February ===
- February 10: George Henderson, Canadian comics store owner (owner of the oldest Canadian comics store Memory Lane Books, also one of the oldest in the world), dies at age 63.
- February 14: Alex Lovy, American animator and comics artist (worked for National Comics and DC Comics), dies at age 78.

=== March ===
- March 12: Hans G. Kresse, Dutch comics artist (Eric de Noorman, Erwin de Noorman, Vidocq, Mahto Tonga), dies at age 70.
- March: Yvonne Hutton, British comics artist (continued Roy of the Rovers), dies three months after having had a car accident.

=== May ===
- May 11: Einar Lagerwall, Swedish comic artist (Disney comics), dies at age 70.
- May 27: Machiko Hasegawa, Japanese comics artist (Sazae-san), dies at age 72.
- May 31: Walter Neugebauer, Yugoslavian comics artist (Jack Jackson, Bimbo Bambus, Patuljak Nosko, Winnetou), dies at age 71.

=== June ===
- June 3: William Gaines, American comics publisher (EC Comics, Mad), dies at age 70.
- June 6: Martin Goodman, American comics publisher (Marvel Comics), dies at age 84.
- June 11: Todd Loren, American comics writer, editor, and publisher (Revolutionary Comics, Rock 'N' Roll Comics), is murdered at aged 32.
- June 27: Elizabeth Shaw, Irish-German illustrator, cartoonist and comic artist (Sonntagmorgen), dies at age 72.

=== July ===
- July 5: Alcides Aguiar Caminha, aka Carlos Zéfiro, Brazilian songwriter and comics artist (drew erotic mini-comics), dies at age 70.
- July 9: Bertil Wilhelmsson, Swedish comics artist (Uncas, made Swedish version of The Phantom), dies at age 65.
- July 12: Al Gabriele, American comics artist (Captain America, co-creator of Black Marvel and Miss America), dies at age 75.
- July 30: Joe Shuster, Canadian-American comic book writer and artist (Action Comics, Detective Comics, co-creator of Superman), dies at age 78.

=== August ===
- August 8: Lynn Karp, American animator and comics artist (The Middles, Disney comics, Looney Tunes comics, Walter Lantz comics, Hanna-Barbera comics), dies at age 82.
- August 25: Jan Gerhard Toonder, Dutch writer, poet and comics writer (wrote scripts for comics by his brother Marten Toonder), dies at age 78.
- August 26: Bob de Moor, Belgian comics artist (long time collaborator of Hergé, creator of Barelli, Meester Mus, Snoe en Snolleke and Cori, de Scheepsjongen), dies at age 66.
- August 30: Jeanne Hovine, Belgian comedian and comics artist (Nic et Nac), dies at age 104.

=== September ===
- September 25: Jaap Beckmann, Dutch illustrator, art critic and comics artist (Kabouterboekjes), dies at age 88.
- September 26: Ruben Yandoc, Filipino comic artist (worked on Patapon, Kasaysayan ng Mga Anghel, 29 and for Marvel Comics, DC Comics), dies at age 65.
- September 27: Zhang Leping, Chinese comics artist and animator (Sanmao), dies at age 91.

=== October ===
- October 23: Horace T. Elmo, American comics artist (Facts You Never Knew, The Fizzle Family, Goofus Family, It's Amazing, Laughs From Today's News, Our Puzzle Corner, Sally Snickers, Socko the Seadog, Useless Eustace, Your Health Comes First, The Rhyming Romeso, Puggy, Tell Me, Spirit Lake Beacon), dies at age 89.

=== November ===
- November 9: Jacques Naret, French teacher, illustrator and comics artist (comics adaptations of literary works), dies at age 80.
- November 17: Hector Torino, Argentine comics artist (Don Nicola, Pascualín, Barrabás, Pepinucho, Coliflor, Mudini), dies at age 78.
- November 28: Co Egelie, Dutch illustrator and comics artist (Hendrik Haan), dies at age 87.
- November 30: Miguel Ambrosio Zaragoza, aka Ambros, Spanish comics artist (El Capitán Trueno), dies at age 79.

=== December ===
- December 5:
  - Arturo Del Castillo, Argentine comics artist (Randall The Killer, Ringo), dies at age 67.
  - Al Liederman, American comics artist (Captain Kid, Monkey Doodles, Cowboy Cal, Lt. Hercules, Sam Stuper, Li'l Leaguer, Madge the Badge, assisted on Captain America), dies at age 81.
- December 17: Horst von Möllendorff, German comics artist, cartoonist and animator, dies at age 86.
- December 23: Vilhelm Hansen, Danish comics artist (Rasmus Klump), dies at age 92.
- December 24: Peyo, Belgian comics artist (The Smurfs, Johan and Peewit, Benoît Brisefer and Poussy), dies at age 64.
- December (exact date unknown): Mike Matthews, British comics artist (Cannibal Romance), dies.

=== Specific date unknown ===
- Fred Abranz, American comics artist and animator (Disney comics, Looney Tunes comics), dies at age 81 or 82.
- Stan Asch, American comics artist (Johnny Thunder, Dr. Midnite), dies at age 79 or 80.
- Arturo Cazeneuve, Argentine comics artist, dies at age 71 or 72.
- Pierre Chivot, French animator and comics artist (Les Grands Crimes et leurs Châtiments), dies at age 63 or 64.
- Aart van Ewijk, Dutch illustrator and comics artist (newspaper comic based on Rodolphe Töpffer's Mr. Cryptogame, Ridder Clap van Rammelsteyn), dies at age 79 or 80.
- Tetsuji Fukushima, Japanese comics artist and mangaka (Sabaku no Mao), dies at age 77 or 78.
- Bernardo Leporini, Italian comics artist, dies at age 87 or 88.
- Bob MacLeod, American comics artist (continued Red Ryder), dies at age 85 or 86.
- Nick Nichols, American comics artist (The Adventures of Peter Pen, continued Otto Watt), dies at age 81 or 82.
- Guida Ottolini, Portuguese comics artist, dies at age 76 or 77.
- Hy Rosen, American comics artist (worked on Georgie, Homer Hooper, comics based on I Love Lucy and New Kids On The Block), dies at age 70 or 71.
- Sam Rosen, American comics letterer (Marvel Comics) dies.
- Pax Steen, Dutch illustrator and comics artist (Klompertje Klomp, een echte Hollandsche Jongen, Binnitoe Billy), dies at age 77 or 78.
- Irvin Steinberg, American comics artist (worked for Fawcett Comics, Quality Comics, Fox Comics, Spark Comics), dies at age 85 or 86.

== Exhibitions and shows ==
- January 15–May 16: "Broad Humor: The History of Women Cartoonists", Cartoon Art Museum (San Francisco) — includes work by Dorothy McKay, Barbara Shermund, Mary Wilshire, Wendy Pini, and Jill Thompson
- February 5–May 16: "Black Ink: Spotlight on African-American Cartoonists", Cartoon Art Museum (San Francisco)
- September 13–November 7: "Political Satire by Oliver Harrington" (part of the Festival of Cartoon Art), The Ohio State University Martin Luther King Jr. Complex for Performing and Cultural Arts (Columbus, Ohio) — examples of Harrington's comic strip character Bootsie, as well as his magazine cartoons
- October 9, 1992 – January 5, 1993: Grand opening exhibition, Words & Pictures Museum (Northampton, Massachusetts) — featuring Mike Ploog, Jack Kirby, Bill Sienkiewicz, Paul Mavrides, Gilbert Shelton, John Severin, Mark Martin, and Wally Wood
- October 26–December 11: "Illusions: Ethnicity in American Cartoon Art" (part of the Festival of Cartoon Art), The Ohio State University Main Library, Philip Sills Exhibition Hall (Columbus, Ohio) — examination of racial and ethnic stereotypes in cartoons from the past 150 years

== Conventions ==
=== Europe ===
- January: CAPTION (Oxford Union Society, Oxford, England, U.K.) – inaugural event
- January 23–26: Angoulême International Comics Festival (Angoulême, France)
- March 14–15: GlasCAC (Candleriggs Town Hall, Glasgow, Scotland) — 3rd annual Glasgow edition of the UKCAC; official guests include creators from the "Deadline Mini-Tour": Nick Abadzis, Rachel Ball, Philip Bond, Glyn Dillon, D'Israeli, Evan Dorkin, Jamie Hewlett, Alan Martin, Shaky 2000, and Si Spencer
- September 19–20: UKCAC92 (Institute of Education, London, England, United Kingdom) — 8th annual edition; guests include John Romita, Jr., Chris Claremont, David Mazzucchelli, Steve Bissette, Mike Mignola, Tom Veitch, Evan Dorkin, Paul Kupperberg, Dave Gibbons, Alan Grant, Peter Milligan, Mike Collins, John McCrea, Lew Stringer, John Beeston, Stephen Sampson, Jamie Hewlett, Doug Braithwaite, Richmond Lewis, Arthur Ranson, Mark Buckingham, Andrew Wildman, and Paul Johnson
- October 25–November 1: Salone Internazionale dei Comics a.k.a. "Lucca 19" (Lucca, Italy) — final iteration of this event before it moved to Rome and became part of Expocartoon

=== North America ===
- January 4–5: Great Eastern Comic Book Convention (Note: This event was not affiliated with Great Eastern Conventions of New Jersey.) (Holiday Inn, St. Louis, Missouri)
- April 12: International Seattle Comic Convention (e.g., "Center Con") (Seattle, Washington) – guests include Martin Nodell
- May 9: Ramapo Comic Con VI (Ramapo High School, Spring Valley, New York) — guests include Brian Augustyn, Rick Bryant, Mike Carlin, Dave Cockrum, Denys Cowan, Evan Dorkin, David Chelsea, Ken Gale, Ron Garney, Jack C. Harris, Fred Hembeck, Dennis Janke, Ray Lago, Elaine Lee, Mike Leeke, Luke McDonnell, Bob McLeod, Fabian Nicieza, Jerry Ordway, Bob Pinaha, Richard Pini, Wendy Pini, Jordan Raskin, Adrienne Roy, Jim Salicrup, Kurt Schaffenberger, Joe Staton, Anthony Tollin, Mercy Van Vlack, John Workman, Bernie Wrightson, and Jim Shooter
- June: Heroes Convention (Charlotte, North Carolina) — guests include Joe Quesada
- June 20–21: Atlanta Fantasy Fair (Hyatt Atlanta Airport, Atlanta, Georgia) — official guests include Peter David
- July 4–6: Chicago Comicon (Ramada O'Hare, Rosemont, Illinois) – special guests Rob Liefeld, Mark Silvestri, Erik Larsen, Todd McFarlane, Jim Valentino, and Whilce Portacio
- July 12: Great Eastern Conventions (Sheraton-Indianapolis Hotel, Indianapolis, Indiana) – special guest Dave Sim
- July 17–19: Dragon Con (Atlanta Hilton & Towers, Atlanta, Georgia) – 6,100 attendees
- August 7–9: Dallas Fantasy Fair (Dallas Market Hall Convention Center, Dallas, Texas) — 5,500 attendees; official guests include Archie Goodwin, John Byrne, Sergio Aragonés, Peter Bagge, Neal Barrett, Jr., Steve Bissette, Bob Burden, Steven Butler, Dan Clowes, Mike Collins, Aline Kominsky-Crumb, Steve Erwin, Mark Finn, Brad W. Foster, Josh Alan Friedman, Kerry Gammill, Dick Giordano, Alan Grant, Gary Groth, Bo Hampton, Ray Harryhausen, Tex Henson, Gilbert Hernandez, Jaime Hernandez, Walt Holcombe, Jaxon, Shane Johnson, Kelley Jones, Gil Kane, Larry King, Denis Kitchen, Rick Klaw, Harvey Kurtzman, Michael Lark, John Lucas, Dean Mullaney, Martin Nodell, Nina Paley, Butch Patrick, Tom Peyer, Michael Price, Don Ivan Punchatz, Joe Riley, Nina Romberg, Jeff Rovin, Mark Schultz, Julius Schwartz, Gilbert Shelton, Lewis Shiner, Ivan Stang, Kenneth Smith, Chris Sprouse, David Tosh, James Vance, Martin Wagner, Reed Waller, Wayno, Shannon Wheeler, Mack White, Sidney Williams, Al Williamson, John Wooley, Kate Worley, and Catherine Yronwode
- August 13–16: Comic-Con International (San Diego Convention Center and Double Tree Hotel, San Diego, California) – 22,000 attendees; special guests: Francis Ford Coppola, Creig Flessel, Bill Griffith, Todd McFarlane, Diane Noomin, Rowena, William Shatner, Gilbert Shelton, Lewis Shiner, Mr. T, Gary Trousdale, Vernor Vinge, and Kirk Wise. Con hosts Jack Kirby's 75th birthday party. Phil Foglio begins long run as Masquerade emcee.
- September: Mid-Ohio Con (Columbus, Ohio) – convention coincides with publication of DC's The Death of Superman. Guests of the show include Roger Stern, John Byrne, and Jim Shooter
- October 30–31: Festival of Cartoon Art (Ohio State University, Conference Theatre, Ohio Union, Columbus, Ohio) — guests include Mell Lazarus, David Hendin, Jim Borgman, Mort Drucker, Nicole Hollander, Mike Konopacki, Buck Brown, Lee Lorenz
- November 1: Great Eastern Conventions (Marriott Hotel, Portland, Oregon) – special guest Dave Sim
- December 13: Great Eastern Conventions (Sheraton Grand Hotel, Houston, Texas) – special guest Dave Sim

== First issues by title ==
=== DC Comics ===
- Batman Adventures
- Batman: Shadow of the Bat
- Batman: Sword of Azrael
- Black Canary
- Darkstars
- Eclipso
- Green Lantern Corps Quarterly
- Green Lantern: Mosaic
- Guy Gardner
- The Heckler
- Team Titans
- Valor

=== Dark Horse Comics ===
- Dark Horse Comics (Anthology series)
- Next Men
- Robocop vs. Terminator

=== Image Comics ===
Brigade

Release: August. Writers: Rob Liefeld, Hank Kanalz, and Eric Stephenson. Artists: Marat Mychaels, Paul Scott, and Norm Rapmund.

Cyberforce (1 of 4)

Release: October. Writer: Eric Silvestri. Artist: Marc Silvestri

Savage Dragon (1 of 3)

Release: July. Writer/Artist: Erik Larsen

Shadowhawk

Release: August. Writer/Artist: Jim Valentino

Spawn

Release: May. Writer/Artist: Todd McFarlane

Supreme

Release: October. Writers: Rob Liefeld and Brian Murray. Artists: Brian Murray and Rob Liefeld.

WildC.A.T.S.

Release: August. Writers: Brandon Choi and Jim Lee. Artists: Jim Lee and Scott Williams.

Youngblood

Release: April. Writers: Rob Liefeld and Hank Kanalz. Artist: Rob Liefeld.

=== Kodansha ===
Sailor Moon

Release: July. Writer and artist: Naoko Takeuchi.

=== Marvel Comics ===
Cage

Release: April.

Darkhold: Pages From The Book of Sin

Release: October.

James Bond Jr.

Release: January.

Kid 'n Play

Release: February.

Morbius, the Living Vampire

Release: September

Nomad v2

Release: May.

The Punisher War Zone

Release: March.

Ravage 2099

Release: December.

Spider-Man 2099

Release: November.

Spirits of Vengeance

Release: August.

Warlock v2

Release: May.

Warlock and the Infinity Watch

Release: February.

WCW World Championship Wrestling

Release: April.

==== Limited series ====
The Adventures of The Thing

Release: April.

An American Tail: Fievel Goes West

Release: January.

Cops: The Job

Release: June.

Defenders of Dynatron City

Release: February.

Hook

Release: February.

Quasar Special

Release: March.

The Infinity War

Release: June.

=== Independent titles ===
Kick Fighter Komiks
Release: by Infinity. Writer: Jojo Ende Jr. Artist: Gilbert Monsanto

Oombah, Jungle Moon Man
Release: August by Strawberry Jam Comics. Writer/Artist: Mike Bannon.

== Canceled titles by publisher ==
=== DC Comics ===
- Starman, with issue #45 (April )

=== Last Gasp ===
- Wimmen's Comix, with issue #17

=== Marvel Comics ===
- ALF, with issue #50 (February )
- An American Tail: Fievel Goes West, with issue #3 (February )
- Captain Planet and the Planeteers, with issue #12 (September )
- The Destroyer, with vol. 3, #4 (March )
- Original Ghost Rider Rides Again, with issue #7 (January )
- James Bond Jr., with issue #12 (December )
- Kid 'n Play, with issue #9 (October )
- Metropol (by Ted McKeever), with issue #12 (March ) (Epic Comics)
- NFL SuperPro, with issue #12 (September )
- RoboCop, with #23 (January )
- Spider-Man Saga, with issue #4 (February )
- The Toxic Avenger, with issue #11 (February )
- The Transmutation of Ike Garuda, with issue #2 (January ) (Epic Comics)
