= Yellow Kid Award =

European comics award

- Awarded for: Achievements in the field of comics and animation
- Location: 1970–1992: Salone Internazionale dei Comics (Lucca); 1994–2005: Salone Internazionale dei Comics/Expocartoon (Rome)
- Country: Italy
- Formerly called: Silver Plaque (1966); Golden Guinigi Tower (1967); Grand Guinigi (1969)
- First award: 1970

The Yellow Kid Awards (Italian: Premio Yellow Kid) are comic book awards presented in Italy from 1970 to 1992 (Note: Beginning in 1978, funding issues reduced the frequency of the festival — and thus the frequency of the Yellow Kid Awards — to every two years.) at Salone Internazionale dei Comics in Lucca, then from 1994 to 2005 at the Salone Internazionale dei Comics in Rome. The Yellow Kid is one of the world's first awards linked to comics. Their name refers to The Yellow Kid, a character created by the American Richard F. Outcault at the end of the 19th century, and considered one of the first comic book heroes.

== History ==
=== Antecedent prizes ===
From 1966 to 1969, a previous set of prizes were awarded at the Salone Internazionale dei Comics Lucca festival, namely the Silver Plaque (Italian: Targa d'Argento) in 1966, the Golden Guinigi Tower (Italian: Torre Guinigi d'oro) in 1967 and the Grand Guinigi in 1969 (Italian: Gran Guinigi).

In 1966, during the second edition of the festival, the monthly magazine Linus presented three Silver Plaques to Orietta Garzanti, for Best Italian Publisher (for I primi eroi), Best Foreign Publication (for Giff-Wiff) and Best Italian Critic (to Piero Canotto).

The following year, 1967, the festival organized the award ceremony through an international jury. These prizes, the Golden Guinigi Tower, an homage to Lucca's most famous monument, were reserved for participants of the fair and the exhibition "I comics oggi" ("Comic Strips Today"). That year, the festival also awarded six prizes to Gian Luigi Bonelli, Cesare Zavattini, Rino Albertarelli, Benito Jacovitti, Mario Gentilini, and Alpe Editions, an initiative which was not renewed in the following years.

During the following festival, held in November 1968, the awards ceremony was canceled following protests from the authors, in the context of May 68.

The awarding of prizes at Lucca resumed in 1969, this time under the name Grand Guinigi. An encouragement prize and a criticism prize were also introduced.

=== The Yellow Kids ===
From 1970, the awards were renamed after the Yellow Kid; a statuette representing the little boy dressed in a yellow nightgown began being given to the prize winners. The Yellow Kid Awards were presented at Lucca Comics & Games through 1992.

From 1994 to 2005, the Yellow Kid Awards were presented at the Salone Internazionale dei Comics festival held in Rome as part of Expocartoon.

=== Gran Guinigi returns (2006–present) ===
In 2006, Lucca Comics & Games replaced the Yellow Kid Awards by bringing back the Gran Guinigi as a career accomplishment award.

=== Lucca Comics Awards ===
In 2020, as the Lucca festival redubbed itself Lucca Changes amidst a shift to virtual programming during the COVID-19 pandemic, the awards shifted to a new system under the umbrella term Lucca Comics Awards, consisting of 9 categories (3 Yellow Kids, five Gran Guinigis, and one Stefano Beani Award (named for a former festival director), "regardless of nationality, editorial format or distribution method".

== Categories ==
In addition to Yellow Kid awards for Italian writers, artists, and cartoonists; and similar awards for foreign creators, the festival jury also awards special Yellow Kid prizes at its convenience. For instance, the UNICEF plaque rewarding humanist works or institutions (from 1976), renamed the Hector Œsterheld Plaque in 1986; and the Caran-d'Ache Prize rewarding illustrators (from 1978). The organization also awards special guests of the festival a Yellow Kid for "A Life Devoted to Cartooning" (from 1972) and a Caran-d’Ache for "A Life Devoted to Illustration" (from 1982).

Since 1969 accredited journalists present at the festival have also presented prizes, in particular the Fantoche Prize rewarding a critical work on animation (1973-1982); the Critics Referendum Prize rewarding a work of animation (1973), the name of which evolved regularly from 1982; and category prizes rewarding various audiovisual or cinematographic works, taking the name of the Fantoche Prize (from 1984).

Prizes are also awarded by public vote (from 1974) and by a jury dedicated to academic work (Romano Calisi Prize, from 1984).

== List of Yellow Kid Award-winners ==
Unless otherwise specified, these prizes are called the "Yellow Kid Prize for/to...".

=== Authors ===
==== Italian division ====
Year	Winner	Prize (Note: Unless otherwise specified in parentheses, these prizes are named "Yellow Kid".)
1967	Copi (Note: "For its rigorous style and its rebellious irony.")	Golden Guinigi Tower for Artist
1967	Guido Crepax (Note: "For his research linked to the most significant ferments of contemporary visual culture.")	Golden Guinigi Tower for Writer
1969	Pier Carpi (Note: "For his activities in 1968.")	Grand Guinigi for Writer
1969	Michele Gazzarri	Grand Guinigi for Writer
1969	Hugo Pratt (Note: For The Ballad of the Salty Sea.)	Grand Guinigi for Artist
1970	Dino Battaglia	Cartoonist
1970	Alfredo Castelli	Writer
1971	Gianni De Luca	Artist
1971	Mino Milani	Writer
1972	Guido Crepax	Cartoonist
1972	Grazia Nidasio	Artist
1973	Guido Buzzelli	Cartoonist
1973	Lino Landolfi	Artist
1974	Bonvi	Cartoonist
1974	Emanuele Pirella	Writer
1974	Tullio Pericoli	Artist
1975	Massimo Mattioli	Cartoonist
1975	Sergio Toppi	Artist
1976	Altan	Cartoonist
1976	Giuseppe Madaudo	Artist
1978	Cinzia Ghigliano	Cartoonist
1978	Milo Manara	Artist
1980	Daniele Panebarco	Cartoonist
1980	Attilio Micheluzzi	Artist
1980	Cristina Lastrego and Francesco Testa	Caran-d'Ache for Illustration
1982	Vittorio Giardino	Cartoonist
1982	Paolo Eleuteri Serpieri	Artist
1982	Giovanni Mulazzani	Caran-d'Ache for Illustration
1984	Sergio Staino	Cartoonist
1984	Anna Brandoli	Artist
1984	Alarico Gattia	Caran-d'Ache for Illustration
1986	Roberto Dal Prà	Cartoonist
1986	Franco Saudelli	Artist
1986	Fabrizio del Tessa	Caran-d'Ache for Illustration
1990	Tiziano Sclavi	Cartoonist
1990	Massimo Rotundo	Artist
1990	Flavio Costantini	Caran-d'Ache for Illustration
1992	Giorgio Cavazzano	Cartoonist
1992	Giancarlo Alessandrini	Artist
1992	Riccardo Mannelli	Caran-d'Ache for Illustration

==== Foreign/international division ====
Year	Winner	Country	Prize
1967	Jules Feiffer (Note: "For his provocative proposal of a discourse on the current condition of man.")	USA	Cartoonist (Golden Guinigi Tower)
1969	Robert Gigi (Note: For Scarlett Dream and Orion.)	FRA	Artist (Grand Guinigi)
1969	Reg Smythe (Note: For the creation of Andy Capp.)	GBR	Cartoonist (Grand Guinigi)
1969	Robert Crumb	USA	Honorable Mention
1969	Enric Sió	ESP	Honorable Mention
1970	Johnny Hart	USA	Cartoonist
1971	Lee Falk	USA	Cartoonist
1971	Enric Sió	ESP	Artist
1972	Nikita Mandryka	FRA	Cartoonist
1972	Brant Parker	USA	Artist
1973	Fred	FRA	Cartoonist
1973	Eduardo Teixeira Coelho	BRA	Artist
1973	Alberto Breccia	ARG	Special jury prize
1974	Vaughn Bodē	USA	Cartoonist
1974	Antonio Hernández Palacios	ESP	Writer or cartoonist
1974	Roy Crane	USA	Special jury prize
1975	Dan O'Neill (Note: For The Penny-Ante Republican.)	USA	Cartoonist
1975	Jean Giraud	FRA	Artist
1975	Frank Hampson	GBR	Special jury prize (Note: Hampson was declared "Prestigioso Maestro" ("Prestigious Master") and the best writer and artist of strip cartoons since the end of the Second World War.)
1976	Jeff Jones	USA	Cartoonist
1976	Enki Bilal	FRA	Artist
1976	Rius	MEX	UNICEF comics plaque (Note: Prize awarded by the jury on the occasion of a partnership with UNICEF to reward humanitarian works.)
1978	Harry North	GBR	Cartoonist
1978	Carlos Trillo	ARG	Artist
1978	Bobby London	USA	Special jury prize
1978	Karel Thole	NED	Caran-d'Ache for illustration
1978	Oscar Conti	ARG	UNICEF comics plaque
1980	Mœbius	FRA	Cartoonist
1980	Comès	BEL	Artist
1980	Ferenc Pinter	HUN (Note: Pinter had been living in Italy since 1956.)	Caran-d'Ache for a Master of Illustration
1980	Hector Oesterheld	ARG	UNICEF comics plaque
1982	Art Spiegelman	USA	Cartoonist
1982	José Antonio Muñoz	ARG	Artist
1982	Howard Chaykin	USA	Caran-d'Ache for illustration
1984	Jaime Hernandez	USA	Cartoonist
1984	Gilbert Hernandez	USA	Cartoonist
1984	Mario Hernandez	USA	Cartoonist
1984	François Bourgeon	FRA	Artist
1984	Guillermo Mordillo	ARG	Special jury prize
1984	Manuel Sanjuliàn	ESP	Caran-d'Ache for illustration
1986	Horacio Altuna	ARG	Cartoonist
1986	Serge Le Tendre	FRA	Artist
1986	Bill Sienkiewicz	USA	Special jury prize (Note: For "bridging the gap between American and European artistic sensibilities.")
1986	Oscar Chichoni	ARG	Caran d'Ache for illustration
1986	Lorenzo Mattotti	ARG	Special jury prize
1986	Paul Gillon	FRA	Special jury prize
1990	Kent Williams	USA	Cartoonist
1990	Matthias Schultheiss	GER	artist
1990	Juan Giménez	ESP	artist
1990	John Bolton	GBR	Caran-d'Ache for illustration
1992	François Boucq	FRA	Cartoonist
1992	John Byrne	USA	Artist
1992	Frank Thomas	USA	Special jury prize
1992	Ollie Johnston	USA	Special jury prize
1992	Dave McKean	GBR	Caran-d'Ache for illustration
1992	David Caméo	FRA	Plaque Œsterheld (Note: This award, which follows the UNICEF plaque awarded from 1976 to 1984, rewards a work or entity promoting understanding between peoples.)

==== Rome era (1994–2005) ====
Year	Authors
1994	Giovan Battista Carpi (ITA), Greg (BEL), Jim Lee (USA), Claudio Nizzi (ITA), James O'Barr (USA), Pino Rinaldi (ITA)
1995	Giancarlo Berardi (ITA), Jordi Bernet (ESP), Claudio Castellini (ITA), Fred (FRA), Neil Gaiman (GBR), Rodolfo Torti (ITA), Jim Valentino (USA)
1996	Mark Bagley (USA), Luciano Bottaro (ITA), Alfredo Castelli (ITA), Carlo Chendi (ITA), Will Eisner (USA), Alfonso Font (ESP), Scott McCloud (USA), Bill Watterson (USA), Robin Wood (PAR)
1997	Scott Adams (USA); John Dirks (USA); Philippe Druillet (FRA); Michele Medda, Antonio Serra, and Bepi Vigna (ITA); Giuseppe Palumbo (ITA); Alberto Salinas (ARG)
1998	Paul Gillon (FRA), Alejandro Jodorowsky (CHI), Cinzia Leone (ITA), Bob Lubbers (USA), Nicola Mari (ITA), Jeff Smith (USA)
1999	Luca Enoch (ITA), Gallieno Ferri (ITA), Jean Giraud (FRA), Carlos Gómez (ARG), Miguel Ángel Martín (ESP), Vanna Vinci (ITA)
2000	Carlo Ambrosini (ITA), David Finch (USA), Miguelanxo Prado (ESP), Silvia Ziche (ITA), Sergio Zaniboni (ITA)
2001	Massimiliano Frezzato (ITA), Corrado Mastantuono (ITA), Ferdinando Tacconi (ITA)
2002	Carlos Giménez (ESP), Eduardo Risso (ARG), Joann Sfar (FRA)
2003	Paolo Bacilieri (ITA), Pat Masioni (COD), Sid Ali Melouah (ALG)
2005	Lola Airaghi (ITA), Horacio Altuna (ARG), Simone Bianchi (ITA), Gilles Chaillet (FRA)

=== Publishers, journals, organizations ===
Year	Winner	Country	Reason for the Award	Prize
1967	Mondadori Editore	ITA	Its publications, in particular the collection Le grandi storie	Publisher (Golden Guinigi Tower)
1967	Corriere dei Piccoli	ITA		Contribution to the development of Italian comics (Golden Guinigi Tower)
1967	Milano Libri	ITA	For having raised the interest of a new audience	Avant-garde editorial initiative (Golden Guinigi Tower)
1969	Orietta Garzanti	ITA	Its edition of Little Nemo	Italian publisher (Grand Guinigi)
1969	Robert Cottereau	FRA	Lifetime achievement	Foreign publisher (Grand Guinigi)
1969	Claudio Bertieri	ITA	AZ Comics (EK)	Critics Prize (Note: Presented by accredited journalists present at the festival.)
1970	Mondadori	ITA	Oscar Cartoons	Italian publisher (periodical)
1970	Bompiani	ITA	Mafalda	Italian publisher (book)
1970	Georges Rieu	FRA	Pif Gadget	Foreign publisher
1970	André Leborgne	BEL	Ran Tan Plan	Honorable mention
1970	Sansoni	ITA	Enciclopedia dei fumetti	Honorable mention
1970	Club Anni Trenta	ITA	Its chronological reissues	Honorable mention
1971	Laterza	ITA	I fumetti di Mao	Italian book publisher
1971	Sansoni	ITA	Horror	Italian periodical publisher
1971	Abril	BRA		Foreign publisher
1971	Joël la Roche	FRA	Corto Maltese	Honorable mention
1972	Mondadori	ITA		Italian book publisher
1972	Editions Lombard	FRA	Tintin magazine	Foreign publisher
1972	Walter Herdeg	SUI	Comics (direction)	Critics Prize
1972	David Pascal	USA	Comics (direction)	Critics Prize
1973	Dardo	ITA	Its edition of Nick Carter by Bonvi	Italian publisher
1973	Springer	RFA	Zack	Foreign publisher
1974	Daim Press	ITA	Its collection of « I Protagonisti »	Italian publisher
1974	Pala	ESP	All of its activities	Foreign publisher
1974	Henri Filippini	FRA	Their volume of tribute to Alain Saint-Ogan	Honorary Yellow Kid
1974	Maurizio Bovarini	ITA	Their volume of tribute to Alain Saint-Ogan	Honorary Yellow Kid
1975	Cenisio	ITA		Italian publisher
1975	Glénat	FRA		Foreign publisher
1975	Istituto Nazionale per la Documentazione sull'Immagine	ITA	Exhibition "No al fascismo!"	Honorable mention
1976	Daim Press	ITA	The collection Un uomo un'avventura	Italian publisher
1976	Ediciones Amaika	ESP	El Papus	Foreign publisher
1976	Alcidio da Quinta	BRA	Simplex	UNICEF plaque for animated film
1976	André Leborgne	BEL	Ran Tan Plan	Honorable mention
1978	Ottaviano	ITA	The totality of its activities	Italian publisher
1978	Casterman	BEL	À Suivre	Foreign publisher
1980	Editiemme	ITA		Italian publisher
1980	Epic Illustrated	USA		Foreign publisher
1982	Primo Carnera	ITA	Frigidaire	Italian publisher
1982	Éditions Horay	FRA		French publisher
1982	Algerian Comic Strip School	ALG		UNICEF comics plaque
1984	L'Isole trovata	ITA		Italian publisher
1984	Strip Art Features	YUG		Foreign publisher
1984	Editoria Basca	ESP		UNICEF comics plaque
1984	Editori del Grifo	ITA	Glamour International	Special Plaque
1986	Paoline	ITA		Italian publisher
1986	Aedena	FRA		Foreign publisher
1986	Ikusager	ESP		Plaque Hector Œesterheld
1990	Sergio Bonelli Editore	ITA		Italian publisher
1990	El Víbora	ESP		Foreign publisher
1990	Henri Filippini	FRA		Yellow Kid awarded by the jury
1990	Carlsen	GER		Plaque Hector Œsterheld
1992	Franco Cosimo Panini	ITA		Italian publisher
1992	Tundra Publishing	USA		Foreign publisher

==== Rome era (1994–2005) ====
Year	Award-recipient(s)
1994	Astorina (Italy), Casterman (France)
1995	DC Comics (United States), Eura Editoriale (Italy)
1996	Bonelli (Italy), Dargaud (France)
1997	Oreste Del Buono (Italy), Raw (United States), Edizioni d'Arte Lo Scarabeo (Italy)
1998	Lizard Edizioni (Italy), Dark Horse Comics (United States)
1999	Hazard Edizioni (Italy), El Víbora (Spain)
2000	L'Association (France), Macchia Nera (Italy), Mare Nero (Italy), Lanciostory (Italy)
2001	Kappa Edizioni (Italy)
2002	Coconino Press (Italy), El Jueves (Spain)
2003	Pascal Morelli (France), Éditions Omnibus (France)
2005	Edicions de Ponent (Spain)

== Film and animation prizes ==
=== Critics' Referendum Prize / Lucca City Grand Prize ===
This prize, presented by accredited journalists present at the festival, rewarded an animated work produced by Italians. It was renamed the Critics' Prize in 1982. In 1984, the prize was reconfigured as the Lucca City Grand Prize, awarded by a special jury and highlighting a recent Italian cartoon.

Year	Winner(s)	Award-winning work	Prize
1973	Emanuele Luzzati	Pulcinella	Critics' Referendum Prize
1973	Giulio Gianini	Pulcinella	Critics' Referendum Prize
1974	Bruno Bozzetto	Self-Service	Critics' Referendum Prize
1975	NOT AWARDED		
1976	Bruno Bozzetto	Allegro non troppo	Critics' Referendum Prize
1978	Roberto Perini, Enzo Sferra, and Alighiero Giuseppetti	Upupa	Critics' Referendum Prize Short Film division
1978	Giulio Gianini	Il flauto magico	Critics' Referendum Prize Feature Film division
1978	Emanuele Luzzati	Il flauto magico	Critics' Referendum Prize Feature Film division
1980	Guido Manuli	S.O.S.	Critics' Referendum Prize
1982	La Figura	I Grandi Film in Due Minuti	Critics' Prize
1984	Fusako Yusaki	Ama gli animali	Lucca City Grand Prize
1986	Vincenzo Gioanola	Russian roulette	Lucca City Grand Prize for an Emerging Artist
1990	Gianluigi Toccafondo	La Coda	Lucca City Grand Prize for an Emerging Artist
1992	Simona Mulazzani	La Pista	Lucca City Grand Prize

=== Fantoche Prize (1973–1982) ===
This prize, presented by accredited journalists present at the festival, rewarded Italian critical work devoted to animation.

Year	Winner	Award-winning work	Publisher
1973	Piero Zanotto	L'Italia di cartone and other works	Liviana
1974	Attilio Giovannini		
1975	Gianni Rondolino	Storia del Cinema d'Animazione	Einaudi
1976	Sergio Michelli	Cinema di animazione in Bulgaria	Cappelli
1978	Giannalberto Bendazzi	Topolino e poi	Il Formichiere
1980	NOT AWARDED		
1982	Alfio Bastiancich	L'Opera di Norman McLaren	Giappichelli

=== Fantoche Prize (1984-92) ===
In 1984, the Fantoche Prize was extensively renewed. Now awarded by the same jury as the Grand Prize, it rewarded audiovisual or cinematographic works and was divided into several categories.

Year	Winner	Work	Category
1984	Manfredo Manfredi	Orson Welles, genio del cinema	TV Show
1984	Bruno Bozzetto	Sigmund	Advertising Spot
1984	Cairoli Elementary School (Turin)	L'importante è partecipare	Educational or Documentary Film
1984	Fusako Yusaki	Ama gli animali	Free Subject Movie
1986	San Giacomo Elementary School (Turin)	Sueno e colore	Film Produced by an Educational Institution
1986	Piero Mazzoni	Firenze-Europa	Film Trailer
1986	Filippo Fantoni	Firenze-Europa	Film Trailer
1986	Enzo D'Alò	Se fumi tu, fumano tutti	Documentary or Scientific Film
1986	Enrico Carlesi	Se fumi tu, fumano tutti	Documentary or Scientific Film
1986	Fusako Yusaki	Rotondo, quadrato, triangolo	Feature Film
1990	Bruno Caccia Elementary School (Turin) and the Magic Lantern	Fumosofia	Film Produced by an Educational Institution
1990	Ernesto Paginoni	San Pellegrino Aranciat	Advertising or Promotional Film
1990	Antonella Abbatiello	Magic Circus	Documentary or Scientific Film
1990	Guido Manuli	+ 1-1	Feature Film
1990	Laura Di Biagio	Race Timed Out	Video
1992	Students of the Istituto Europeo di Design (Milan)	Attenda, prego	Film School Film
1992	Gianluigi Toccafondo	Media Salles, Cinema d'Europa	Advertising, Promotional or Support film
1992	NOT AWARDED		Documentary or Scientific Film
1992	Maurizio Forestieri, Ferro Piludu, Lucilla Salimei, and Fabio Testa	Tiramolla e il cacciatore	Feature Film
1992	Luca Prassa and Oscara Tornincasa	Creeps!!! The Authorized Version 1992	Video

== Other prizes ==
=== Yellow Kid "A Life Devoted to Cartoons" ===
This prize, given by the festival organizers, rewards a cartoonist or animator for their career work.

Year	Winner	Country	Role
1972	Hergé	BEL	Cartoonist
1973	Walt Disney Productions	USA	Animation studio
1974	Lotario Vecchi	ITA	Cartoonist
1975	Adolfo Aizen	BRA	Comics publisher
1976	José Luis Salinas	ARG	Cartoonist
1978	Milton Caniff	USA	Cartoonist
1980	Arturo del Castillo	ARG	Cartoonist
1982	Jesús Blasco	ESP	Cartoonist
1984	Lee Falk	USA	Cartoonist
1986	Will Eisner	USA	Cartoonist
1990	Romano Scarpa	ITA	Cartoonist
1992	Benito Jacovitti	ITA	Cartoonist

Starting in 1982, the festival began also awarding a special Caran-d'Ache prize for "A Life of Illustration".

Year	Winner	Country
1982	Francesco Carnevali	ITA
1984	Burne Hogarth	USA
1986	Jayme Cortez	BRA
1990	Ziraldo	BRA
1992	Sergio Toppi	ITA

=== Audience Award ===
Year	Winner	Country	Division
1974	Rino Albertarelli	Italy	Cartoonist
1978	Scuola del Fumetto di Lucca	Italy	Comics school
1980	Héctor Oesterheld	Argentina	Posthumous Writing Award
1982	Wow Agenda Planning 1983	Italy	Publication
1984	Alarico Gattia	Italy	Illustrator
1986	Edizioni Glamour International	Italy	Publishing house
1990	NOT AWARDED		
1992	Sciuscià (Edizioni di Miceli)	Italy	Re-release

In 1990, the festival management also presented the Max Prize for Cartoon Cinema to the Deutsches Filmmuseum in Frankfurt am Main. Two years later, this prize was awarded to the Cineteca del Friuli (it).

=== Romano Calisi Prize ===
Awarded from 1984 to 1992, this prize recognized Italian academic work devoted to comics. It was awarded by a specific jury.

Year	Winner	Work
1984	Arianna Pregagnoli	Flash Gordon: la concettualizzazione del 'diverso' attraverso il fumetto americano (1930-1940) (1982-1983)
1984	Elena Furin	I fumetti di Frigidaire (1983-1984)
1986	Francesca Camera	Alexandre Alexeieff e la cinègravure (1985-1986)
1986	Marco Cadioli	Tecniche di computer animation (1985-1986)
1990	Sonia Maria Bibe Luyten	Potere e diffusione dei fumetti giapponesi quale riflesso della società nipponica (1987-88)
1990	Alessandra Buniva	Fumetto: variazioni e varianti (1989-90)
1992	Gianni Albanese	L'uomo africano nei fumetti dell'Italia coloniale fascista
