= Dallas Fantasy Fair =

Defunct multi-genre fan convention held in Dallas, Texas

- Status: Defunct
- Genre: Comic books, movies, pop culture
- Venue: Sheraton Park Central (1983–1989); Marriott Park Central (1986–1988); Market Hall Convention Center (1992–1995); Harvey Hotel (1995)
- Locations: Dallas, Texas
- Country: United States
- Inaugurated: 1982
- Most recent: 1995
- Attendance: 9,000 (1995)
- Organizer: Larry Lankford d/b/a Bulldog Productions

The Dallas Fantasy Fair was an annual multi-genre fan convention held between 1982 and 1995 in Dallas, Texas. From 1989 until the show's demise in 1996, it was the home of the Harvey Award ceremonies. During its heyday, the show was one of the largest comics conventions in the country, third in attendance behind San Diego Comic-Con and the Chicago Comicon.

Most Dallas Fantasy Fairs took place over three days, from Friday to Sunday. The convention featured a large range of pop culture elements, primarily comic books but also science fiction/fantasy, film/television, animation, anime, manga, toys, horror, and collectible card games. Along with panels, seminars, and workshops with comic book professionals, the Dallas Fantasy Fair often featured previews of upcoming films, and such evening events as a costume contest. The convention featured a large floorspace for exhibitors, including comic book dealers and collectibles merchants.

The show included an autograph area, as well as the Artists' Alley where comics artists signed autographs and sold or produced free sketches. (Despite the name, Artists' Alley could include writers and even glamour models.) Organizer Lankford was known for his generosity in regards to Artists' Alley, often giving even marginal creators free tables at the convention.

== History ==
Antecedents to the Dallas Fantasy Fair included the Southwesterncon, held alternately in Dallas (where it was known as "D-Con") and Houston (where it was known as "Houstoncon") in the late 1960s and 1970s. D-Con '79 was produced by Larry Lankford (born June 10, 1960–died Dec. 25, 2013) who went on three years later to found the Dallas Fantasy Fair.

The first Dallas Fantasy Fair was held over four days from June 10–13, 1982, by Lankford's Bulldog Productions, the business name. The Fantasy Fair programming coordinator was Paul McSpadden. (McSpadden later went on to become coordinator of the Harvey Awards.)

In the early years of the show, from 1984–1986, the convention was held over Independence Day weekend. In 1986, an additional show was added to the fall season, over Thanksgiving weekend.

In 1988, Bulldog Productions held three iterations of the Fantasy Fair, in the spring, summer, and fall. Throughout the summer of 1988, in addition to the Dallas-based conventions, Lankford put on two-day conventions in Austin, Houston, and San Antonio. The Austin event (also known as the Austin Fanfair) became an annual affair in the late 1980s, typically attracting 500–600 attendees (the Dallas convention, meanwhile, averaged about 2,500 visitors).

Mark Walters, promoter of the later Dallas-area convention the "Dallas Comic & Toy Fest" aka "Dallas Comic Show" (est. 2000), and co-promoter of the "Dallas Comic Con" (est. 2002), attended his first convention at the 1990 Fantasy Fair; he soon went to work for Lankford and eventually rose to be his second-in-command.

In 1989–1993, Bulldog Productions put on monthly one-day "Dallas Minicons" in the area which generally attracted about 500 attendees per show.

The March 1993 presentation of the Harvey Awards at the Fantasy Fair occurred shortly after the death of the award's namesake Harvey Kurtzman; much of the show was in the form of a fund-raiser to help pay for the continuance of the awards. (That year there was also a Dallas Fantasy Fair held from June 18–20.)

The 1994 summer edition of the Dallas Fantasy Fair was held at Dallas Market Hall, and saw record attendance for the show, hitting 9,500 attendees. At the time it was the third-largest show in the United States behind San Diego Comic-Con and Chicago Comic Con.

In 1995, Bulldog put on three iterations of the show, in April, August (when the Harvey Awards were presented), and November. The summer show featured such guests as Rob Liefeld, Jaime Hernandez, Al Williamson, Alex Ross, James O'Barr, and Jim Steranko.

=== Demise ===
The 1996 show, scheduled for July 27–28 at Market Hall, in Dallas, was cancelled on short notice due to money management issues. (The Harvey Awards which were scheduled to be presented there were never publicly presented, instead being mailed to the winners.) The Dallas Collectors Con was put together as a substitute event at the Plano Centre in suburban Plano, Texas, coordinated by Bobby Briggs and Bruce Spiegelman and then joined by John Fairless, J. David Spurlock, and James Mayfield, with official guests Bernie Wrightson, Bill Sienkiewicz, Howard Cruse, Rob Liefeld, and Kurt Busiek.

== Locations and dates ==
Dates	Location	Official guests	Notes
June 10–13, 1982	Dallas	Jan Strnad, Frank Miller, John Byrne, Kerry Gammill, Gil Kane, Dick Giordano, Jaxon, Gary Groth, Ed Andrews, Robert Asprin, Neal Barrett, Jr., Lillian Carl, C. J. Cherryh, Tom De Falco, Stephen R. Donaldson, Roger Elwood, William M. Gaines, Arnold Hendrick, Burne Hogarth, Steve Jackson, Carol Kalish, Harvey Kurtzman, Joe Lansdale, Paul McSpadden, George R. R. Martin, Real Musgrave, Edwin Neal, Warren Norwood, Mike Presley, George W. Proctor, Don Punchatz, John Romita, Jr., Lewis Shiner, Doug Smith, J. David Spurlock, Roger A. Sine, Bruce Sterling, Howard Waldrop, Ron Wolfe, Sam De La Rosa, David Martin, John Wooley, Jack Williamson, Philip José Farmer	
November 25–27, 1983	Sheraton Park Central, Dallas	Roger Zelazny, Alan Dean Foster, George R.R. Martin, and Howard Waldrop	Called the "Dallas Fantasy Festival"
July 6–8, 1984	Dallas	Mike W. Barr, Kerry Gammill, Fred Saberhagen, Kenneth Smith, Jim Starlin, Roger Zelazny, and Philip José Farmer	
July 5–7, 1985	Dallas	Gil Kane, Wendy Pini, Kenneth Smith, Gary Groth, Harvey Kurtzman, and R. Crumb	
July 4–6, 1986	Dallas Marriott Park Central	Dave Stevens, Gary Groth, Pat Broderick, Will Eisner, Mike Gustovich, Burne Hogarth, Gil Kane, Jack Kirby, Joe Kubert, William Messner-Loebs, Frank Miller, Jean Giraud, Doug Moench, Richard Pini, Dave Sim, Donald Simpson, Alex Toth, Doug Wildey, Neal Barrett, Jr., David A. Cherry, Carole Nelson Douglas, George R.R. Martin, Ardath Mayhar, Warren Norwood, Frederik Pohl, Kay Reynolds, Fred Saberhagen, Lewis Shiner, John Steakley, Howard Waldrop, Jack Williamson, Philip José Farmer, Roger Zelazny	
November 14–16, 1986	Marriott Park Central	Stan Lee	Celebration of the 25th anniversary of Marvel Comics
June 5–7, 1987	Sheraton Park Central	Philip Jose Farmer, Richard Pini, Harvey Kurtzman, Frederik Pohl, Harvey Pekar, Bob Burden, Gene Colan, J.M. Dematties, Gary Groth, Burne Hogarth, Gil Kane, Denis Kitchen, Phil Lasorda, Hugo Pratt, Dave Stevens, Don Thompson, Doug Wildey, Jack Williamson, Mike Zeck	
November 27–29, 1987	Marriott Park Central	Harvey Kurtzman, Jaime Hernandez, Denis Kitchen, Gilbert Hernandez, Don Simpson, Steve Rude, Kenneth Smith, Brad W. Foster, and Doug Potter	
March 11–13, 1988	Marriott Park Central	Brad W. Foster, David Tosh, Kenneth Smith, Dan Piraro, Lea Hernandez, Doug Potter, Scott Bieser, and Craig Miller	
July 1–3, 1988	Sheraton Park Central	Harvey Kurtzman, Burne Hogarth, Gil Kane, and Gary Groth	
November 25–27, 1988	Marriott Park Central		
July 14–16, 1989	Sheraton Park Central	Doug Hazlewood	Presentation of the Harvey Awards
Nov. 24–26, 1989	Dallas		c. 2,500 attendees
July 13–15, 1990	Dallas	Harvey Kurtzman, Neil Gaiman, Todd Klein, Tom Orzechowski, Sergio Aragonés, Chester Brown, Bob Burden, Kurt Busiek, Will Eisner, Kerry Gammill, Gilbert Hernandez, Jaime Hernandez, Adam Hughes, Jim Lee, P. Craig Russell, Paul Ryan, Mark Schultz, Julius Schwartz, Bill Sienkiewicz, Jim Starlin, John Totleben, Bill Willingham, Gregory Wright, and Roger Zelazny	Presentation of the Harvey Awards
July 19–21, 1991	Dallas	Ray Harryhausen	Presentation of the Harvey Awards
November 29-December 1, 1991	Dallas	Robert Asprin, Stephen R. Bissette, Dave Dorman, Denis Kitchen, Tex Henson, Butch Patrick, Rick Veitch, S. Clay Wilson, Roger Zelazny, Don Ivan Punchatz, Brad W. Foster, Kerry Gammill	
August 7–9, 1992	Dallas Market Hall Convention Center	R. Crumb, Archie Goodwin, John Byrne, Sergio Aragonés, Peter Bagge, Neal Barrett, Jr., Steve Bissette, Bob Burden, Steven Butler, Dan Clowes, Mike Collins, Aline Kominsky-Crumb, Steve Erwin, Mark Finn, Brad W. Foster, Josh Alan Friedman, Kerry Gammill, Dick Giordano, Alan Grant, Gary Groth, Bo Hampton, Ray Harryhausen, Tex Henson, Gilbert Hernandez, Jaime Hernandez, Walt Holcombe, Jaxon, Shane Johnson, Kelley Jones, Gil Kane, Larry King, Denis Kitchen, Rick Klaw, Harvey Kurtzman, Michael Lark, John Lucas, Dean Mullaney, Martin Nodell, Nina Paley, Butch Patrick, Tom Peyer, Michael Price, Don Ivan Punchatz, Joe Riley, Nina Romberg, Jeff Rovin, Mark Schultz, Julius Schwartz, Gilbert Shelton, Lewis Shiner, Ivan Stang, Kenneth Smith, Chris Sprouse, David Tosh, James Vance, Martin Wagner, Reed Waller, Wayno, Shannon Wheeler, Mack White, Sidney Williams, Al Williamson, John Wooley, Kate Worley, and Catherine Yronwode	5,500 attendees; presentation of the Harvey Awards
March 5–7, 1993	Dallas	Adam West, Donald Simpson, Larry Stroman, Tex Henson, Kerry Gammill, and Shannon Wheeler	Presentation of the Harvey Awards
June 18–20, 1993	Market Hall	Special guest: Clive Barker; Dave Sim	
July 29–31, 1994	Market Hall	Dave Sim, Martin Wagner, Jim Lee, Alex Ross, Al Williamson, Gil Kane, Peter David, Kurt Busiek, George Pérez, Mark Schultz, Sergio Aragonés, Mark Bagley, Mat Broome, James O'Barr, Richard Corben, and Jim Valentino	Presentation of the Harvey Awards
April 15–16, 1995	Harvey Hotel, Irving	Adam Hughes, Susie Owens, and Mark Goddard	
Aug. 11–13, 1995	Market Hall	Jim Steranko, Sergio Aragonés, Kurt Busiek, Rob Liefeld, Terry Moore, David W. Mack, Martin Nodell, Julius Schwartz, Mark Schultz, Jeff Smith, William Stout, Chris Ware, Al Williamson, Jim Woodring, Jaime Hernandez, Alex Ross, and James O'Barr	summer edition; c. 9,000 attendees; presentation of the Harvey Awards
November 25–26, 1995	Harvey Hotel	Julie Newmar	
