= Mario Alberti =

Italian comic book artist and writer

Mario Alberti (born 7 May 1965) is an Italian comic book artist and writer known for his works on the collections Nathan Never, Legs Weaver, Morgana and Redhand, and for his cover work, in particular for DC Comics.

== Career ==
Alberti graduated in Economics with a thesis on distribution in the comics market. He began working as a professional illustrator and writer in 1990 with "Holly Connick", a short story published in the magazine Fumo di China.

In 1991, in the magazine Intrepido he started collaborating with writer Michelangelo La Neve, signing some episodes of the series Dipartimento ESP among others.

In 1993, Alberti joined Sergio Bonelli Editore, working on the series Nathan Never and in 1994 won the Albertarelli prize with the episode "Il canto della balena". Since 1995, he's also been working on the series Legs Weaver, again for Sergio Bonelli Editore, and in 1999 debuted in script-writing with "L'immortale", of the same collection.

In 2000, Alberti teamed up with Luca Enoch to co-write a project for the French market: Morgana, published since 2002 by Les Humanoides Associes. Morgana is translated in France, Italy, Germany, Portugal and Spain and the first issue was also released in the US. Again for Humanoides, in 2004, he joined writer Kurt Busiek to create the new series Redhand.

Alberti has also illustrated some covers for Federico Memola's series Jonathan Steele and since 2006 has been collaborating with DC Comics doing covers for Aquaman, Wonder Woman, Doctor Fate and Shadowpact.
