= Jane Archer =

Jane Archer may refer to:

- Jane Archer (security official) (1898–1982), married name of Jane Sissmore, MI5 and SIS security official
- Jane Archer (writer), pseudonym of Nina Romberg
- Jane Archer, character in The Age of Innocence (1934 film)
- Jane Archer, character in Psycho Killer (film)
