= Leap-Frog (comics) =

Leap-Frog is the name of several characters appearing in American comic books published by Marvel Comics. The first incarnation of Leap Frog, Vincent Patilio, first appeared in Daredevil #25 (February 1967). The second incarnation, Buford Lange, debuted in Daredevil (vol. 2) #16 (July 2001).

The characters use a frog suit containing electrical coils on the soles of each of the two flippers which allow the wearer to leap great distances up to 60 ft (18 m) high or 100 ft (30 m) long. The boots' power source is worn on their backs like a backpack, and triggered via hidden buttons in their gloves. Additionally, the costume later had a strength-boosting exoskeleton, along with substantial internal padding and a computer-guided system for leaping accuracy.

== Publication history ==
Vincent Patilio debuted in Daredevil #25-26 (February–March 1967), created by writer Stan Lee and artist Gene Colan. He later appeared in Daredevil Annual #1 (September 1967), The Defenders #64 (October 1978), Iron Man #126-127 (September–October 1979), Marvel Team-Up #121 (September 1982) and 131 (July 1983), The Defenders #131 (May 1984), Marvel Fanfare #31-32 (March, May 1987), Damage Control #2 (December 1989), The Spectacular Spider-Man #185 (February 1992), Daredevil (vol. 2) #16 (May 2001), Spider-Man's Tangled Web #12 (May 2002), and Wolverine #27 (June 2005).

Buford Lange debuted in Daredevil (vol. 2) #16 (July 2001), created by writer Brian Michael Bendis and artist David W. Mack.

== Fictional character biography ==
=== Vincent Patilio ===
The first Leap-Frog is Vincent Patilio. Created by writer Stan Lee and artist Gene Colan, the character first appeared in Daredevil #25 (February 1967).

Vincent Patilio Leap-Frog
- Daredevil #25, art by Gene Colan

Publication information
- Publisher: Marvel Comics
- First appearance: Daredevil #25 (February 1967)
- Created by: Stan Lee; Gene Colan

In-story information
- Full name: Vincent Patilio
- Species: Human
- Team affiliations: Defenders Impersonators; Emissaries of Evil; Damage Control
- Notable aliases: The Might Leap Frog; Human Frog; Leap-Frog
- Abilities: Exoskeleton frog suit granting: Computer-guided system for leaping accuracy; Enhanced strength and agility; Ability to leap great distances; Internal padding for impacts

Tired of his lack of success as an inventor of novelty items for toy companies, Vincent Patilio designed himself electrically powered coils that could be used for leaping great distances and incorporated them into a frog-like costume.

Calling himself the Leap-Frog, Patilio was not known for being lucky in his criminal career. For example, he started by taking blind lawyer Matt Murdock hostage (Murdock being in fact the civilian identity of the superhero Daredevil). He was recruited by Electro to serve in his Emissaries of Evil in revenge against Daredevil for previous defeats. However, Daredevil defeated them. Other attempts at being a criminal failed at the hands of Daredevil, before the Leap-Frog was defeated by Iron Man and sent to jail.

Patilio served his time in prison and then returned to his wife Rose and young son Eugene. Rose's salary kept the family financially solvent until she died of cancer. Barely making enough money to support himself and his son, Patilio fell into despair. At this time, his son Eugene donned a version of his costume to attempt to create a heroic career as the "Frog-Man". Patilio was at first proud of his son for capturing the villain Speed Demon, but his pride turned to disapproval as Eugene continued to serve as a superhero. Patilio forbade his son to adventure as the Frog-Man.

Patilio later went undercover in the villainess White Rabbit's gang on behalf of the police, which brought him into conflict with his son, who, as the Frog-Man, tried to take down the White Rabbit. Patilio ultimately defeated the White Rabbit with the help of his son and got a reward that considerably eased his financial worries.

When the White Rabbit reappeared, she teamed up with the Walrus to create mayhem which would not stop until the Frog-Man surrendered to her. Spider-Man went after the two. Meanwhile, Vincent ordered Eugene to stay at home while he donned a revamped version of his costume, announced himself as the Frog-Man and joined Spider-Man. However, Eugene also donned his own costume and joined the struggle, and the trio managed to stop the criminals.

Currently, Patilio remains retired from supervillainy.

=== Buford Lange ===
Buford Lange Leap-Frog

Publication information
- Publisher: Marvel Comics
- First appearance: Daredevil (vol. 2) #16 (July 2001)
- Created by: Brian Michael Bendis; David W. Mack

In-story information
- Full name: Buford Lange
- Species: Human
- Notable aliases: Leap-Frog
- Abilities: Exoskeleton frog suit granting: Computer-guided system for leaping accuracy; Enhanced strength and agility; Ability to leap great distances; Internal padding for impacts

The second Leap-Frog is Buford Lange. Created by writer Brian Michael Bendis and artist David W. Mack, the character debuted in Daredevil (vol. 2) #16 (July 2001).

Buford Lange is an abusive father who lived in Hell's Kitchen with his wife Allison and their autistic son Timmy. He stumbled upon an abandoned Leap-Frog costume and began a short-lived criminal career by robbing small businesses. Lange fought Daredevil on a rooftop only to be electrocuted by Timmy, who did not want to see his hero, Daredevil, hurt. Lange fell off the rooftop and into a garbage truck on the street below.

He was resurrected by the Hand and joined an assault on the S.H.I.E.L.D. Helicarrier, which resulted in its destruction. He was then killed again by Wolverine, as were most of the supervillains and superheroes the Hand were using in the attack.

== Powers and abilities ==
Leap-Frog possesses no superpowers. He wears an exoskeleton frog suit that gives him enhanced strength and agility. The suit is also equipped with electrically powered leaping coils that allow him to reach a height of six stories per jump. The boots' power source is worn on his back like a backpack. His suit also has an internal padding to protect him from impacts and a computer-guided system for leaping accuracy.

== Reception ==
Michael Patterson of Bam Smack Pow said actor Brandon Stanley turned Leap-Frog into an "incredibly memorable" character in a short amount of time. Comic Book Resources included Leap-Frog as one of the animal-themed villains they would like to see be introduced in the Marvel Cinematic Universe. Shrishty Mishra of Collider stated the arrival of Leap-Frog in the Marvel Cinematic Universe (MCU) was excitedly anticipated by fans after the release of the She-Hulk: Attorney at Law's trailer.

== In other media ==
- A composite character incarnation of Leap-Frog appears in the She-Hulk: Attorney at Law episode "Ribbit and Rip It", portrayed by Brandon Stanley. This version of Leap-Frog was Eugene Patilio who was inspired by his father Vincent Patilio.
- Vincent Patilio appears in Your Friendly Neighborhood Spider-Man, voiced by Kellen Goff. This version is Otto Octavius' assistant.
- In 2024, HeroClix released a Leap-Frog action figure inspired by the She-Hulk: Attorney at Law incarnation of the character.
