= Roberto De Angelis =

Italian comic book artist (born 1959)

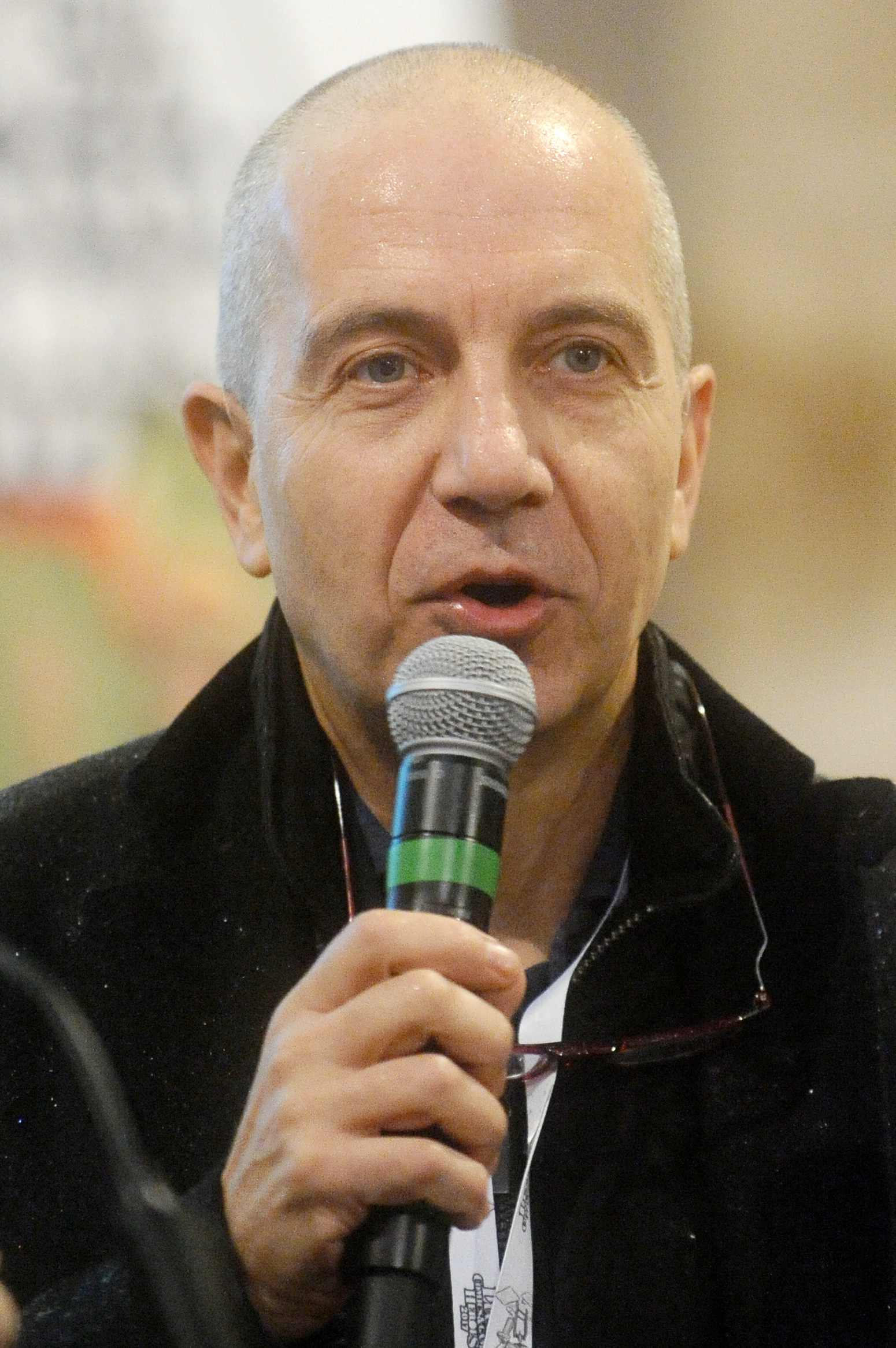
Roberto De Angelis

Roberto De Angelis (born 16 December 1959) is an Italian comic book artist.

Born in Naples, De Angelis debuted in the comics world in 1981. He subsequently collaborated on adult and splatter comics series. In 1989 he started to work for Sergio Bonelli Editore, Italy's most popular comic book publisher, with some stories for Nathan Never, becoming the regular cover artist for the series with #60.

In 1992 he finished his most acclaimed work, Kor-One. He also collaborated on Bonelli's Legs Weaver, a Nathan Never spin-off.

== Sources ==
- Page at Lambiek
