= White Rabbit (Marvel Comics) =

- Lorina Dodson as the White Rabbit, as depicted on the variant front cover of Tony Stark: Iron Man #10 (April 2019); Art by Annie Wu

Publication information
- Publisher: Marvel Comics
- First appearance: Marvel Team-Up #131 (July 1983)
- Created by: J.M. DeMatteis; Kerry Gammill; Mike Esposito

In-story information
- Alter ego: Dr. Lorina Dodson
- Species: Human
- Team affiliations: Sinister Syndicate; Hateful Hexad; Menagerie
- Partnerships: Walrus
- Notable aliases: White Rabbit; Rabbit
- Abilities: Skilled martial artist; Equipments include: Umbrella that fires explosive and razor tipped carrots; Giant and heavily armed robotic rabbit; Genetically altered killer rabbits; Modified vehicles; Rocket boots

White Rabbit (Dr. Lorina Dodson) is a supervillain appearing in American comic books published by Marvel Comics. Created by J.M. DeMatteis, Kerry Gammill, and Mike Esposito, the character first appeared in Marvel Team-Up #131 (July 1983). White Rabbit is a wealthy criminal who based her supervillain persona on Alice in Wonderland. She is a recurring antagonist of the superhero Spider-Man.

== Publication history ==
White Rabbit debuted in Marvel Team-Up #131 (July 1983), created by J.M. DeMatteis, Kerry Gammill, and Mike Esposito. She appeared in the 2022 The Amazing Spider-Man series. She appeared in the 2022 Spider-Verse Unlimited Infinity Comic series.

== Fictional character biography ==
Born to a wealthy family, Lorina Dodson, who would become White Rabbit, grew up in a safe, secure environment and was showered with all the material possessions she ever wanted. However, she was bored, and only found entertainment from classic literature, such as Alice in Wonderland. As she grew older, her family married her off to an older gentleman named Lewis Dodson (a name derived from the author of the Alice in Wonderland books, Lewis Carroll, whose real name was Charles Dodgson). At the time of the marriage, Lorina was twenty-five and Lewis was eighty-two. Lorina resented being treated as a trophy wife, so she killed her husband, and the police thought it was an accident.

After that, she would only mention that he "died happy", and subsequently used her inheritance to buy various gadgets so that she could experience a life full of danger and excitement. She became the White Rabbit, an eccentric criminal, whose costume resembled a cross between the literary character from Alice in Wonderland and a Playboy Bunny. While the White Rabbit is clearly insane to the point of being completely ridiculous, she is quite articulate and has a great knowledge of literature. At some point early in her career she was trying to establish her reputation and confronted Deadpool, who was bonded with the Venom symbiote. She used an array of carrot bombs and mutant rabbits, as well as stealing only watches. She spent her first days as a criminal robbing various fast food joints, most notably Kwikkee Burger. She and her gang were eventually confronted by Frog-Man (a frequent customer at Kwikkee Burger), who was able to defeat her hired help only with Spider-Man's aid. White Rabbit escaped, but struck later at a book fair, where she found the two superheroes once again. The White Rabbit, witnessing her men getting defeated, fled using her jet-boots, but they began to malfunction, allowing Frog-Man to knock her into a building.

Much later, she resurfaced, plotting to get her revenge on Frog-Man. She allied herself with the Walrus, but they were defeated by Spider-Man, Frog-Man, and Frog-Man's father, Leap-Frog. Ditching the Walrus, she popped up again later with two new villains, Mad Hatter and Dormouse, though they were both actually hired actors, as no other supervillains would work with the White Rabbit. She formed a new plan by capturing Grizzly and Gibbon and ransoming them for one billion dollars in gold. She also created several genetically-altered rabbits, who were ready to eat Grizzly and Gibbon. The Mayor, however, only offered the White Rabbit $2.50, which caused her to fly into a rage and raise the ransom to five billion dollars (this time the Rabbit demanded that the ransom be paid entirely in quarters), but Spider-Man, under the alias of the Bombastic Bag-Man - as he was currently wanted for murder as Spider-Man thanks to the machinations of Norman Osborn, he was forced to use an alternative costume and lacked the time to get any of his other new costumes infiltrated the White Rabbit's hideout and battled her giant rabbit robot. She was then knocked out by Grizzly (who claimed he did it so he would not be accused of being sexist). He and his partner had escaped, remembering Gibbon's natural affinity with the Animal Kingdom and thus taming the GM Rabbits.

In the limited series Claws, the White Rabbit, her outfit modified (now more than ever resembling a Playboy Bunny), became romantically involved with Arcade, a man with a dedication for drama and who controls 'Murderworlds', where people are killed off in carnivalesque ways. They go after Wolverine and the Black Cat. The two heroes manage to defeat Arcade and the White Rabbit. They are dropped off in the Savage Land, a prehistoric land hidden deep in the Antarctic. The White Rabbit became queen of a group of tribal warriors.

White Rabbit is next seen in Los Angeles, where she is working as a drug dealer to the rich and famous. One of her clients is Bobby Carr, Mary Jane Watson's boyfriend. Carr is also an actor and is using Mutant Growth Hormone to bulk up for a movie role. The Rabbit turned on her client when the U.S. Department of Justice wanted him to inform them who his dealer is. White Rabbit and her gang attacked Carr and MJ at a trendy Los Angeles club, gassing the party goers. Mary Jane rescued Carr and took out White Rabbit at the club, when the police arrived and took the White Rabbit into custody.

White Rabbit later appears as a member of the Menagerie, a group of animal-themed villains. White Rabbit named the group the Menagerie because of the villains' animal themes, even though Skein did not use the Gypsy Moth name. She and the Menagerie are defeated by Spider-Man despite the fact that Skein used her powers to destroy Spider-Man's outfit. White Rabbit and the rest of the Menagerie later reunite to commit a diamond heist, which led to another defeat at Spider-Man's hands.

White Rabbit later appeared as a member of the Hateful Hexad alongside Bearboarguy, Gibbon, Ox, Squid, and Swarm. During the Hateful Hexad's fight against Spider-Man and Deadpool, the battle is crashed by Itsy Bitsy who brutally murders or incapacitates most of the villains. This traumatizes White Rabbit, who is saved by Deadpool.

White Rabbit appears as a member of the female incarnation of the Sinister Syndicate. The Sinister Syndicate begins their mission where they attack the F.E.A.S.T. building that Boomerang is volunteering at. They are defeated and arrested, but freed by an unknown assailant.

== Powers and abilities ==
White Rabbit possesses no superhuman abilities but is obsessed with the works of Lewis Carroll, and her equipment reflects her obsession. She is a skilled martial artist. Additionally, White Rabbit is well-educated, having at least a Bachelor of Arts degree in Literature or its equivalent.

=== Equipment ===
She uses a range of weapons, such as an umbrella that shoots razor-sharp or explosive carrots, a large, rideable, heavily armed robot rabbit, genetically engineered killer rabbits and jet boots. White Rabbit also owns two custom-modified vehicles, a zeppelin called the Flying Hare, and a van called the Bunnymobile.

== Reception ==
Jonathan K. Kantor of Looper called White Rabbit an "absolute peach." Michael Cheang of The Star included White Rabbit in their "8 of the coolest (and weirdest) rabbit characters in comic books" list.

Screen Rant included White Rabbit in their "Spider-Man: 10 Best Female Villains" list, and in their "10 Spider-Man Villains That Are Smarter Than They Seem" list. Comic Book Resources ranked White Rabbit 6th in their "Marvel: Dark Spider-Man Villains, Ranked From Lamest To Coolest" list, 8th in their "Spider-Man: 10 Weirdest Animal Villains From The Comics That We'd Like To See In The MCU" list, 9th in their "Spider-Man's 10 Funniest Villains" list, and 10th in their "10 Best Animal-Themed Spider-Man Villains" list.

== Other versions ==
An alternate version of White Rabbit appears in the Marvel Adventures Spider-Man series. She is romantically interested in Venom and even writes to him when he is in the Vault. White Rabbit plans a series of Lewis Carroll-inspired robberies alongside Venom, while he pretends to be Spider-Man's new unwanted sidekick. However, Spider-Man figures out the plan: after Eddie Brock had attempted to use this reality's purely benevolent symbiote to murder Peter, Venom had turned off Eddie's brain and used his body to be a hero and try and convince Peter to take him back, having been attempting to make Peter jealous with his actions (including dating White Rabbit, having her pretend to kidnap him) the entire time with the aim of taking him back. Accepting his fake kidnapping ruse as being uncovered, the symbiote breaks up with White Rabbit and resumes hero work with Eddie's corpse, hoping Peter will one day take him back.

== In other media ==
In 2020, Hasbro released an action figure of White Rabbit as part of the Marvel Legends action figure line.
