= Onofrio Catacchio =

Italian comics artist

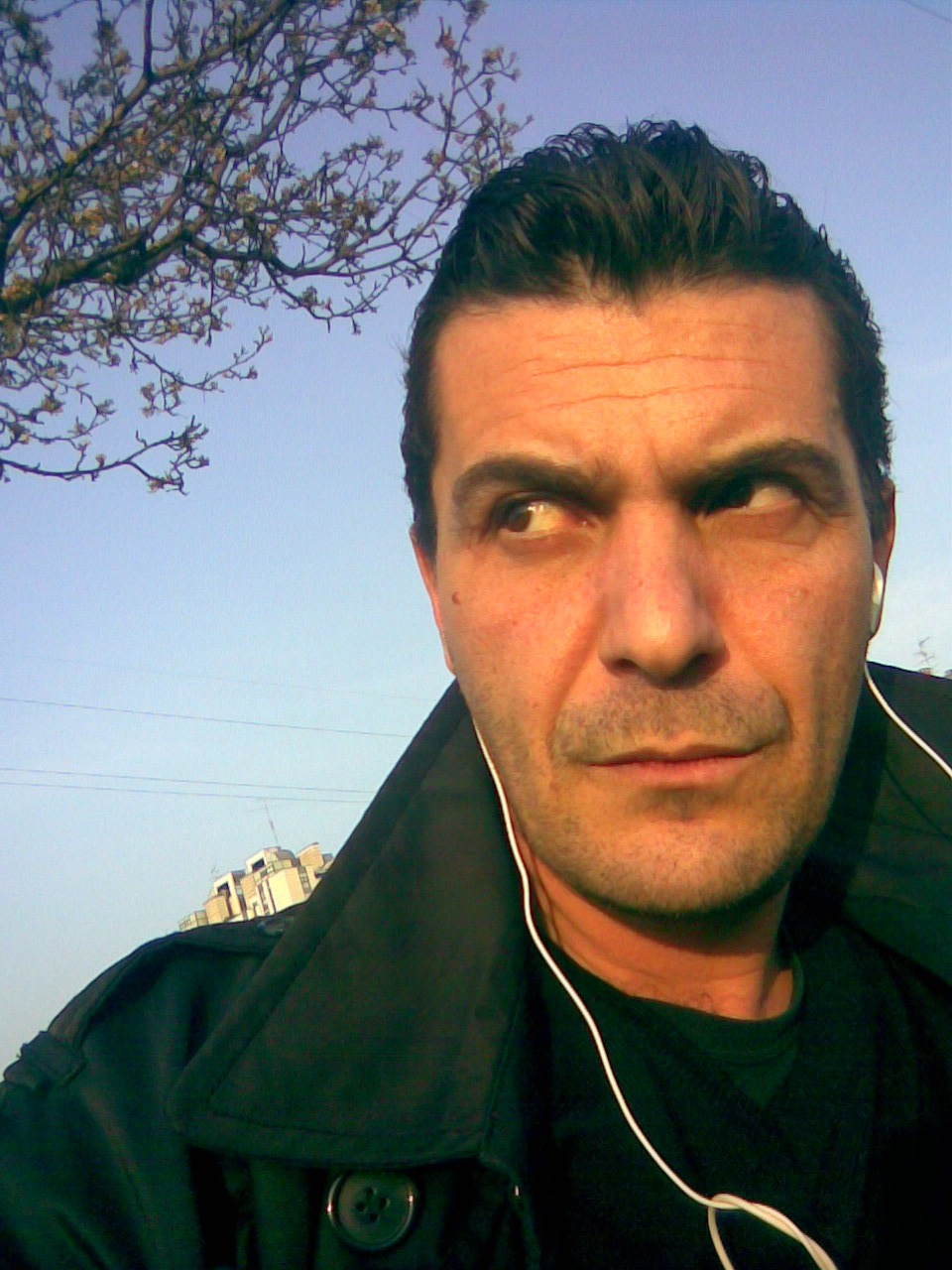
Onofrio Catacchio

Onofrio Catacchio (born 28 October 1964) is an Italian comics artist.

Onofrio Catacchio was born in Bari in 1964; he currently lives and works in Bologna.

In 1988, he created the character Stella Rossa, who first appeared in the magazines Fuego and Nova Express , being later collected in volumes published by Granata Press. Kappa Edizioni later reprinted it. For Granata Press, he also dramatized and illustrated the Coliandro stories, inspired by works of mystery writer Carlo Lucarelli, re-published by BD editions. As a scriptwriter, he has written Offspring from hell for Andrea Accardi, released in Italy by Kappa Edizioni and in France by Albin Michel.

Since 1995, he has produced various episodes of Nathan Never for Sergio Bonelli Publishing. He dramatized and designed The ballad of Corazza by Wu Ming 2, published by BD/Alta Fedeltà and inserted into the Top Crime anthology by Mondadori. With scripts by Andrea Balzola, he created Freaks’ Farm, a spoof adapted from George Orwell’s novel of a similar title. In 2006, he illustrated stories and stage images from Gaijin!, written by Luigi Bernardi and staged by the Tratto theatre company. With Luigi Bernardi, he was also responsible for the creation of "Habemus Fantomas” for the anthology published by Alta Fedeltà.

In 2010 Catacchio worked as an inker on Marvel's Dark Wolverine series. In 2020 his comic biography of Jackson Pollock, Pollock Confidential was published. In 2023 he was the artist for a new story in the long-running Harry Dickson series of comic albums, Mysterion, followed by The Court of Terror in 2024 (published by Dupuis, or in English by Cinebook).

He also teaches comics at the Academy of Fine Arts in Bologna.
