= Fusako Yusaki =

Japanese artist (1937–2026)

Fusako Yusaki (湯崎夫沙子, Yusaki Fusako; 5 September 1937 – 6 October 2026) was a Japanese-born Italian designer, artist and sculptor known by her claymation works which she produced in Italy, where she lived from 1964 until her death. She later established herself in this field also in Switzerland and Japan.

== Life and career ==
=== Early years ===
Born in the city of Moji, one of the five municipalities united in the 1960s to form today's Kitakyūshū, she graduated in 1960 in creative design from the Faculty of Interior Architecture of the Joshibi University of Art and Design in Tokyo, creating a play sculpture for the Setagaya municipal garden for her thesis. Her passions, however, weresculpture, for which she worked in the following years with three-dimensional sculptures for children's playgrounds, and Italy, fascinated by the beauty of Siena and its Renaissance masterpieces. In 1964, she won a scholarship to study sculpture at the Brera Academy of Fine Arts in Milan, where she moved that same year and where she would live throughout her career. Specializing in large-scale concrete sculptures for exteriors with an abstract feel, in Milan she chose Luciano Minguzzi, one of the few sculptors of that movement in the city at the time, as her university advisor. She quickly realized that this type of art was impossible in Italy and almost entirely abandoned sculpture.

=== Artistic career ===
Her professional breakthrough came when she met her peer, Ro Marcenaro, a pioneer of Italian television animation, who encouraged her to try her hand at animation. She then applied to create commercials for Fernet Branca liqueur using claymation, a film technique in which plasticine, molded into various shapes, is reproduced in stop-motion animation, giving the impression of metamorphosis and movement. Yusaki's creativity convinced the agency in charge to entrust her with the project, in collaboration with Max Squillace, for the animation. The commercials aired starting in 1968 on Carosello, and 56 different episodes aired until 1978, initially in black and white and then in color. The great success of her work on this commercial earned her the Bagatto d'Oro award for the best Italian television advertising films in 1971, and the Bronze Lion at the Cannes International Advertising Festival in 1972.

At the end of the Fernet Branca advertising campaign, Yusaki went through a difficult period. Claymation in Italy was now associated with the liqueur, and no one wanted to compete with the popularity it had achieved. For a while, she created illustrations, ceramics, tile designs, etc., and some educational films for the National Research Council on the origin of earthquakes., meanwhile personally creating animations that she presented at some festivals. In 1985, she created her first and only traditional animated cartoon with the short film L'incredibile Usil. She returned to children's TV animation using plasticine in the 1990s with series for RSI and Japan's NHK, for which she featured regular characters for the first time, while in commercials for Branca she unleashed her creativity. A co-production between the two organizations gave rise to her character Toki Doki, but his next success came with Talpy for Japanese television, a character who transforms into anything and who would be re-produced for 60 episodes.

Even in the following years she was mainly involved with Swiss and Japanese TV, for which she created Peo, a small blue dog for whom she made several series broadcast on the program Colazione con Peo, and Nacho & Pom (ナッチョとポム), red and blue characters included in several series on the children's program Petit Petit Anime (プチプチ・アニメ, Puchi Puchi Anime). Her animation work for Rai is limited to the theme songs for the programs Glu Glu, which has been on the air since 1999, L'albero azzurro, since 2001, in which she appeared in person in some episodes as Aunt Fusako, and a series of bumpers with decidedly different sound effects, broadcast on Rai Yoyo from April 14, 2009, to September 8, 2013. She worked from her own studio in Corsico, Studio Yusaki (スタジオ・ユサキ), where she personally managed to produce four seconds of plasticine animation a day. She was occasionally supported by a variable number of artists in the sector depending on the workload.

Yusaki served on the juries of the most prestigious animated film festivals: in 1989 in Annecy, France, in 1990 in Hiroshima, Japan, in 2000 in Zagreb, Croatia, in 2002 in Espinho, Portugal, and in 2003 in Wissembourg, France. In 2004, she won the Lifetime Achievement Award at the In 1989, she was awarded the title of Female Artist of the Year by the Avon Cultural Foundation. Among her various activities, she held lessons on three-dimensional illustrations and on stop motion at the European Institute of Design in Milan, with which she collaborated for many years also in the creation of her own films. The Hara Museum of Contemporary Art in Tokyo hosts the complete series of her films.

=== Death ===
Yusaki died on 6 October 2026, at the age of 89.

== Awards ==
- "Lucca 16" Grand Prix and Fantoche Award at the 1984 International Comics Salon for Ama gli animali.
- Premio Fantoche al Salone Internazionale dei Comics at the 1986 International Comics Salon for the best feature film (Rotondo, quadrato, triangolo).

== Bibliography ==
- Guido Tavassi (2012). Storia dell'animazione giapponese. Autori, arte, industria, successo dal 1917 a oggi. Lapilli extra. Roma: Tunué. ISBN 978-88-97165-51-4.
- Sabrina Perucca (2008). Il cinema d'animazione italiano oggi. Bulzoni. pp. 105–106. ISBN 978-88-78703-33-9.
