= Guido Buzzelli =

Italian painter

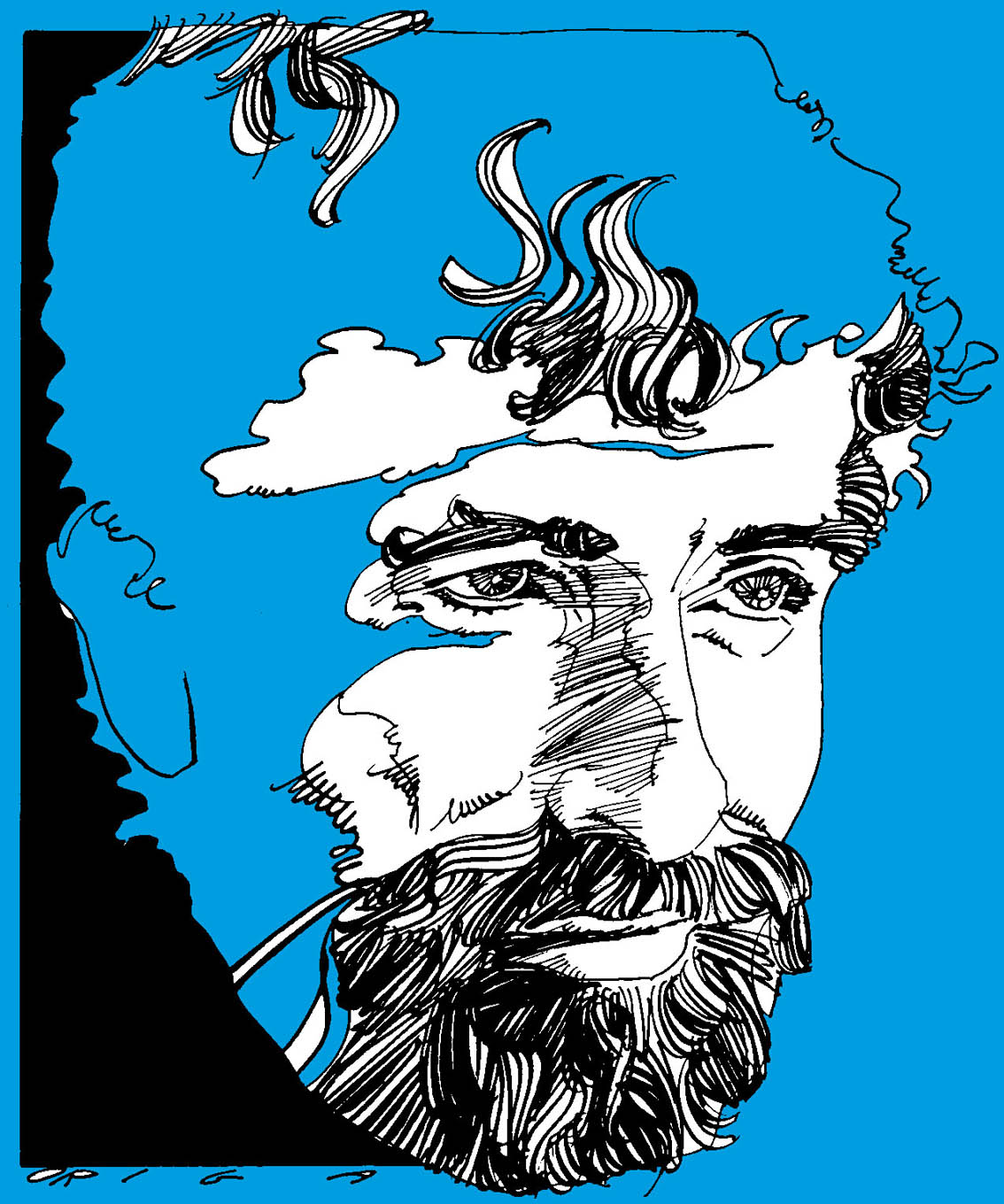
- Guido Buzzelli as drawn by Graziano Origa
- Born: 27 July 1927; Rome, Italy
- Died: 25 January 1992 (aged 64); Rome, Italy
- Other name: Blotz
- Occupation: Comics artist
- Awards: Yellow Kid Award, Crayon d'Or

Guido Buzzelli (27 July 1927 – 25 January 1992) was an Italian comics artist, writer, illustrator and painter.

== Biography ==
Buzzelli was born in Rome into a family in which his grandfather had been a decorator, his father a painter, and his mother a model. He frequented the Academy of St. Luke and initially decided to follow his father's steps. Later, however, he entered the workshop of Rino Albertarelli, one of the main Italian comic book artists of the time, debuting in the 1950s with the magazine Zorro; he also provided covers for magazines of the publisher Fratelli Spada. Other Buzzelli comics of the time include Susan Bill, Alex l'eroe dello spazio, Bill dei Marines, Bambola and Dray Tigre.

Later, he moved to Spain and then to England, where he produced the strip Angélique for the Daily Mirror. After his return to Italy and his marriage to Grazia de Stefani (1960), he initially devoted himself to painting. He returned to comics with a personal project, La rivolta dei racchi ("The Revolt of the Ugly", 1966), a fantasy history containing a sarcastic metaphor of the class struggle; the work was to be published only in 1970 in France, on the magazine Charlie Hebdo. He soon established himself as one of the most praised comics artists in France and, later, also in Italy, with other stories such as I Labirinti (1970), Zil Zelub (1972), Annalisa e il diavolo (1973), L'intervista (1975), L'Agnone (1977), La guerra videologica (1978), all mixing social themes with fantastic and dream-like atmospheres.

In 1973, he received the Yellow Kid Award as best illustrator and author in the Lucca Comics convention, followed in 1979 by the French equivalent, the Crayon d'Or. He then started to collaborate with magazines and newspapers such as Linus, Alter Linus, Paese Sera, Il Messaggero, L'Espresso, L'Eternauta, Psyco, Corriere dei Ragazzi, Comic Art, Playmen, Menelik, L'Unità, and, in France, Pilote, Métal Hurlant, À Suivre, Circus, Le Monde, Fluide Glacial and others. Under the pseudonym of Blotz he created several erotic illustrations published in France in Charlie Mensuel as well as the collections Démons and Buzzelliades.

In 1976, Buzzelli illustrated L'uomo del Bengala for Sergio Bonelli Editore; for the same publication in 1985, he drew the first giant-size volume of Tex Special, written by Claudio Nizzi (1985). In the 1980s, he collaborated with Italian television and taught in the European Institute of Design.

Buzzelli died in Rome in 1992.

== Filmography ==
Year	Title	Role	Notes
1970	Investigation of a Citizen Above Suspicion		

== Sources ==
- Luca Raffaelli, introduction to L'arte di Buzzelli, I Classici del Fumetto di Repubblica #57.
