= Frog-Man =

- Frog-Man as depicted in Marvel Team-Up #131 (July 1983). Art by Paul Smith.

Publication information
- Publisher: Marvel Comics
- First appearance: Marvel Team-Up #121 (June 1982)
- Created by: J. M. DeMatteis (writer); Kerry Gammill (artist)

In-story information
- Alter ego: Eugene Paul Patilio
- Species: Human
- Team affiliations: Avengers Initiative; Action Pack; Misfits
- Abilities: Frog suit granting: Superhuman strength, agility and leaping Special impact padding Ability to bounce off surfaces

Frog-Man (Eugene Patilio) is a comedic superhero appearing in American comic books published by Marvel Comics. Created by writer J. M. DeMatteis and artist Kerry Gammill, the character's costume is borrowed from the pre-existing character Leap-Frog, who debuted in 1967. Frog-Man was first introduced in the comic book series Marvel Team-Up (a series focused on pairing Spider-Man with a different character each month) in issue #121, published in June 1982 with a cover date of September.

The character made his live-action debut in the Marvel Cinematic Universe television series She-Hulk: Attorney at Law (2022), played by Brandon Stanley.

== Publication history ==
In Daredevil #25 (1965), writer Stan Lee and artist Gene Colan created and introduced a criminal named Vincent Patilio who creates electrical "leaping coils" and becomes the costumed villain Leap-Frog. The villain appeared in a handful of stories and then made his final appearance as an active criminal in Iron Man #126-127, published in 1979. Three years later, writer J. M. DeMatteis decided to revive the idea of Leap-Frog but as a more comedic, light-hearted character, a would-be hero rather than a villain. Named "Frog-Man", this new character was introduced as Vincent Patilio's previously unknown son in Marvel Team-Up #121 in June, 1982 (with a cover date of September). Frog-Man's first story was illustrated by artist Kerry Gammill, who designed the character's civilian appearance. DeMatteis later referred to Frog-Man as one of his "all-time favorite" characters.

Frog-Man next appeared in Marvel Team-Up #131 (1983), also written by J. M. DeMatteis and with art by Gammill and Mike Esposito. In the story, Frog-Man joins Spider-Man against the White Rabbit.

The Amazing Spider-Man #266 (July 1985) presented a story written by Peter David and with art by Sal Buscema and Josef Rubinstein, where Frog-Man forms a short-lived alliance with Spider-Kid and Toad. In 1993, the April issue of Marvel Age #124 featured an April Fool's Day ad for a new Misfits team with a membership of Frog-Man, Squirrel Girl, Razorback, and 3-D Man.

Frog-Man does not appear again until 1991 in The Spectacular Spider-Man #184, though he only appears on the last page as a lead-in for the subsequent story. The Spectacular Spider-Man #185 (1992) reveals that Eugene had been attending college in New York City, providing an explanation to his scattered appearances before then. The issue also introduces Eugene's aunt Marie, who lives with his father and acts as a surrogate mother, and further expands Eugene's childhood and that his mother died before he was a teenager. The story features the villains White Rabbit (who now sees Frog-Man as her arch-enemy) and the Walrus, who join forces as "the Terrible Two".

Frog-Man is briefly mentioned in Civil War: Battle Damage Report #1 (2007) as one of several heroes who registers with the U.S. government's Avengers Initiative, which assigns an Avengers team for each state. Soon afterward, in the pages of Avengers: The Initiative #7 (2007), a Frog-Man is as a member of the Initiative's Kentucky team, the Action Pack. A year later in Avengers: The Initiative #19 (2008), it is revealed that soon after joining the Action Pack, Eugene was captured and replaced by a Skrull infiltrator. Eugene then makes a cameo in Avengers: The Initiative #20 (2008), now back on Earth and attending a support group of people whose identities were stolen by Skrull infiltrators.

== Powers and abilities ==
As Frog-Man, Eugene has worn two costumes that protect his body and give him physical enhancements. The original, classic costume (first worn by his father as the villain Leap-Frog) was specially padded to protect the wearer from surface impact and attacks by combatants who may have some small degree of superhuman strength. The frog-suit absorbs most of the impact, forcing the wearer to bounce rather than face serious injury. The original suit's other main feature were electrically-powered "leaping coils" in the boots that allowed the wearer to have their agility enhanced as much as "a dozen times" and allowed them to leap as high as 6 stories in the air. The suit's padding and leaping coils gives the wearer a degree of superhuman strength.

Each of Eugene's suits is controlled and empowered by a "power pack" unit attached to the back, resembling a backpack. Controls on the power pack allow Frog-Man to enhance or lower the power levels of his strength and agility, as well as how powerful his superhuman leaps will be.

== In other media ==
- Frog-Man makes a non-speaking cameo appearance in the Fantastic Four: World's Greatest Heroes episode "The Cure" as a failed applicant to the Fantastic Four.
- Eugene Patilio appears in the She-Hulk: Attorney at Law episode "Ribbit and Rip It", portrayed by Brandon Stanley. This version goes by his father Vincent Patilio's codename of Leap-Frog and utilizes a suit developed by Luke Jacobson.
