= Kerry Gammill =

American artist (born 1954)

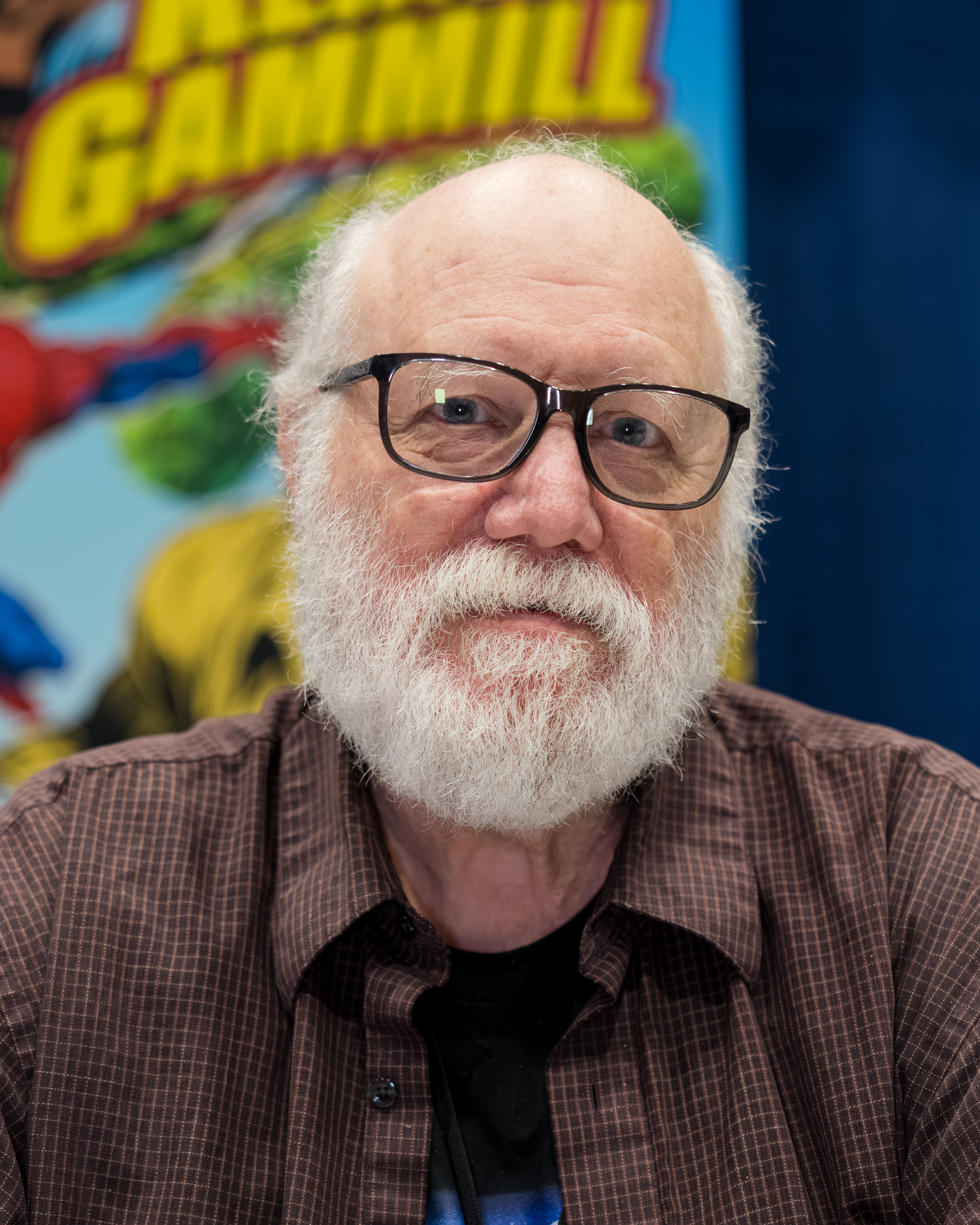
- Gammill at GalaxyCon Oklahoma City in 2026
- Born: April 26, 1954 (age 72)
- Area: Penciller
- Notable works: Marvel Team-Up; Power Man and Iron Fist; Superman vol. 2

Kerry Gammill (born April 26, 1954) is an American artist who has worked in the fields of comic books, special effects, storyboards, and character designs. As a comic book artist, he is best known for his work on Power Man and Iron Fist for Marvel Comics and Superman for DC Comics.

== Early life ==
Gammill grew up as a fan of the comics of the 1960s and 1970s, particularly the work of Jack Kirby, Steve Ditko, John Buscema, Gene Colan, and Jim Steranko.

== Career ==
Kerry Gammill began working for Marvel Comics with his first published work, a Spider-Man/Daredevil story titled "A Fluttering of Wings Most Foul", appearing in Marvel Team-Up #73 (Sept. 1978). During his time in the comics industry, he illustrated such series as Power Man and Iron Fist, Superman vol. 2, and Action Comics. He collaborated with writer J. M. DeMatteis on the creation of Frog-Man in Marvel Team-Up #121 (Sept. 1982) and featured the character in a storyline in Marvel Fanfare #32 (May 1987). Gammill co-created such other characters as Ariel, White Rabbit, Chance, Leila Davis, and Draaga. He drew the first two issues of the Deadly Foes of Spider-Man limited series in 1991 and in the following year, was one of the artists on the debut issue of Team Titans.

Power Girl #1 (June 1988). Cover art by Kerry Gammill and inker Dick Giordano

After leaving comics, Gammill became a special effects concept artist, character designer, and storyboard artist for movies, TV shows, and the gaming industry. Projects he worked on include Virus, Species II, Phantoms, The Outer Limits, and Tremors: The Series.

In 2001, Vanguard Productions published Kerry Gammill's Drawing Monsters and Heroes for Comics and Film, a how-to book containing art from Gammill's comics, kids' promotions, and creature design for movies and TV. Gammill later co-authored another book for Vanguard on the art of Basil Gogos. Gammill was one of the artists on Star Wars #108 (July 2019), a one-shot featuring a story titled "Forever Crimson", which continued Archie Goodwin's story from Star Wars #50 (August 1981), "The Crimson Forever". In 2020, Gammill served as art director on Legendary Comics' adaptation of Bram Stoker's 1897 Dracula novel, which used the likeness of Bela Lugosi, the lead actor in the 1931 film from Universal Pictures. Four years later, Gammill worked on a similar project, Mary Shelley's Frankenstein Starring Boris Karloff which adapted the 1818 novel into comics and used the likeness of Boris Karloff, the lead actor in the 1931 film produced by Universal Pictures.

== Personal life ==
Gammill has been married to Susan Gammill since 1975. They have three children, a son, Jeff, born in 1980, another son, Steve, born in 1983 and a daughter, Kathryn born in 1992. He also has three grandchildren, Piper, Brielle and Madelyn. Gammill lives in Fort Worth, Texas.

== Bibliography ==
=== Absolute Comics ===
- Action Packed Tales of the Dallas Fantasy Fair #1 (two pages) (1994)

=== Adhesive Comics ===
- Too Much Coffee Man #5 (one page) (1996)

=== DC Comics ===
- Action Comics #606 (cover only); #647–652, 655, 657 (1989–1990)
- Adventures of Superman Annual #2 (1990)
- Elvira's House of Mystery #8 (1986)
- Hawk and Dove Annual #2 (1991)
- The New Teen Titans vol. 2 #26–27 (1986–1987)
- The New Titans #80 (1991)
- Power Girl #1–4 (covers only) (1988)
- Superman vol. 2 #24–28, 30, 32–35, 39, 50, 52 (1988–1991)
- Superman For Earth #1 (1991)
- Superman: The Man of Steel #15 (1992)
- Superman: The Wedding Album #1 (1996)
- Superman: Under a Yellow Sun #1 (1994)
- Team Titans #1 (1992)
- Who's Who in the DC Universe #1, 3, 5, 14, 16 (1990–1992)
- Who's Who in the Legion of Super-Heroes #6–7 (1988)
- Who's Who: The Definitive Directory of the DC Universe #11 (1986)
- Who's Who: Update '87 #5 (1987)

=== IDW Publishing ===
- The Chilling Archives of Horror Comics! #24 (text article) (2018)

=== Legendary Comics ===
- Bram Stoker's Dracula Starring Bela Lugosi GN (2020)
- Mary Shelley's Frankenstein Starring Boris Karloff GN (2024)

=== Marvel Comics ===
- Cable vol. 2 #3 (1993)
- Deadly Foes of Spider-Man #1–2 (1991)
- Doctor Strange vol. 2 #46 (1981)
- Double Edge: Alpha #1 (1995)
- Fallen Angels #1–2, 4, 7 (1987)
- Fantastic Four #266, 296 (1984–1986)
- The Further Adventures of Indiana Jones #7–8, 11–12 (1983)
- Marvel Fanfare #19 (Cloak and Dagger); #31–32 (Captain America); #48 (She-Hulk) (1985–1989)
- Marvel Team-Up #73, 119–125, 127–129, 131 (1978–1983)
- Power Man and Iron Fist #61–68, 70–72, 74–75, 77–79 (1980–1982)
- Savage Sword of Conan #58 (1980)
- The Spectacular Spider-Man Annual #4 (1984)
- Star Wars #70, #102, #108 (1983–1986, 2019)
- Uncanny X-Men #223 (1987)
- What If...? vol. 2 #80 (1995)
- Wonder Man #1 (1986)
- X-Factor Annual #9 (1994)

=== Nate Butler Studio, Inc. ===
- Aida-Zee #1 (1990)

=== The S. F. C. A. ===
- Rocket's Blast Comicollector #123 (1975)

Preceded by Trevor Von Eeden	Power Man and Iron Fist artist 1980–1982	Succeeded by Denys Cowan
Preceded by Herb Trimpe	Marvel Team-Up artist 1982–1983	Succeeded by Sal Buscema
Preceded by Mike Mignola	Superman vol. 2 artist 1988–1989	Succeeded by Jerry Ordway
Preceded by George Pérez	Action Comics artist (with George Pérez); 1989–1990	Succeeded by Bob McLeod
