= Words & Pictures Museum =

Former art museum in Northampton, Massachusetts

Words & Pictures Museum of Fine Sequential Art
- Established: 1992
- Dissolved: 1999
- Location: 140 Main Street; Northampton, Massachusetts
- Coordinates: 42.318614°N 72.630794°W
- Type: the exhibition of narrative art, cartoons, comic books, and graphic novels
- Collection size: 20,000
- Website: www.wordsandpictures.org

The Words & Pictures Museum of Fine Sequential Art was an art museum in Northampton, Massachusetts, devoted to exhibitions of narrative art, cartoons, comic books, and graphic novels. Open to the public from 1992 to 1999, the museum's collection at one point numbered 20,000 original works from hundreds of artists including Simon Bisley, Vaughn Bodē, Robert Crumb, Richard Corben, Frank Frazetta, Jaime Hernandez, Jack Kirby, George Pratt, Dave McKean, Frank Miller, Jon J Muth, Bill Sienkiewicz, and Gilbert Shelton.

== History ==
The museum was founded in 1990 by artist Kevin Eastman, co-creator of the Teenage Mutant Ninja Turtles. Initially located in Northampton's Roundhouse Building, the museum opened its doors on October 9, 1992.

In late 1994, the museum moved to the Beardsley Building (named for English illustrator Aubrey Beardsley), into a state-of-the-art four-floor facility in downtown Northampton, which it occupied until its closing.

Despite receiving a large donation in the summer of 1996, by mid-1997 it was reported that the museum was facing financial difficulties. The museum closed its doors for good on July 16, 1999.

After the closure of the physical exhibition space, the museum's outreach program moved online in the form of the Virtual Words & Pictures Museum, and featured online educational exhibits and research directories. The virtual museum's website does not appear to have been updated since 2002.

== Exhibitions ==
Cartoonist John Severin's artwork was exhibited three times at the Words & Pictures Museum—in the grand-opening group show (October 9, 1992 – January 5, 1993), the group exhibit "War No More" (May 18 – August 8, 1993), and the group show "Classic Comics: A Selection of Stories from EC Comics" (December 7, 1995 – February 11, 1996).

1993 saw the exhibit "War No More", featuring George Pratt, Bill Sienkiewicz, Jack Kirby, John Severin, and Frank Redondo.

1994 saw an exhibition devoted to the art of Jack Kirby, while 1995 featured a Frank Miller show (also featuring the work of Bill Sienkiewicz and Klaus Janson).

"Oliphant: The New World Order" was a 1996 exhibition. Other 1996 exhibitions included one devoted to classic EC Comics pages and one to the artists of Image Comics. 1996 also saw a Cerebus exhibit, featuring the work of Dave Sim and Gerhard; followed by a show devoted to women in comics, featuring Mary Fleener, Marie Severin, Trina Robbins, Diane DiMassa, and others.

1997 had a show celebrating 20 years of Heavy Metal magazine.

1998 featured a show called "The Best of Fantagraphics", curated in partnership with Fantagraphics front-man Gary Groth and featuring the work of Peter Bagge, Dan Clowes, Mary Fleener, and Los Bros Hernandez.

1999 saw a show devoted to work by contemporary African American comics creators, including Rob Stull, Hannibal King, Brian Stelfreeze, and others.
