= Alarico Gattia =

Italian comic artist and illustrator (1927–2022)

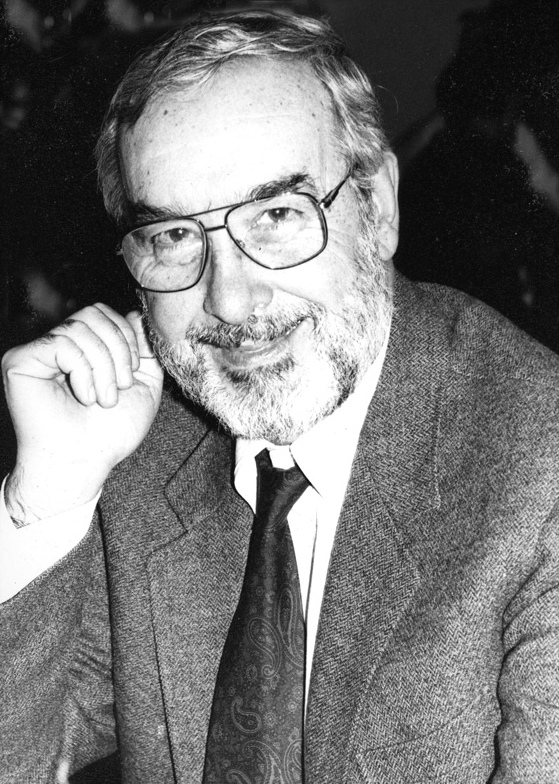
- Born: 9 December 1927; Genoa, Italy
- Died: 3 September 2022 (aged 94); Genoa, Italy
- Occupation: Cartoonist

Alarico Gattia (9 December 1927 – 3 September 2022) was an Italian comic artist and illustrator.

== Life and career ==
Born in Genoa, Gattia started his career in Milan as an illustrator for advertising and for several Mondadori publications, notably Epoca. He made his debut as a comic artist in the late 1960s, collaborating with comics magazines such as Corriere dei Piccoli, Il Giornalino, and Comic Art, and illustrating some Diabolik and Tex Willer stories. He illustrated some volumes of Storia d’Italia a fumetti ("History of Italy in comics"), with texts of Enzo Biagi, and collaborated with the French publishing house Éditions Larousse, illustrating the volumes Histoire du Far West and A la découverte du monde.
