= Claudio Castellini =

Italian comic book artist

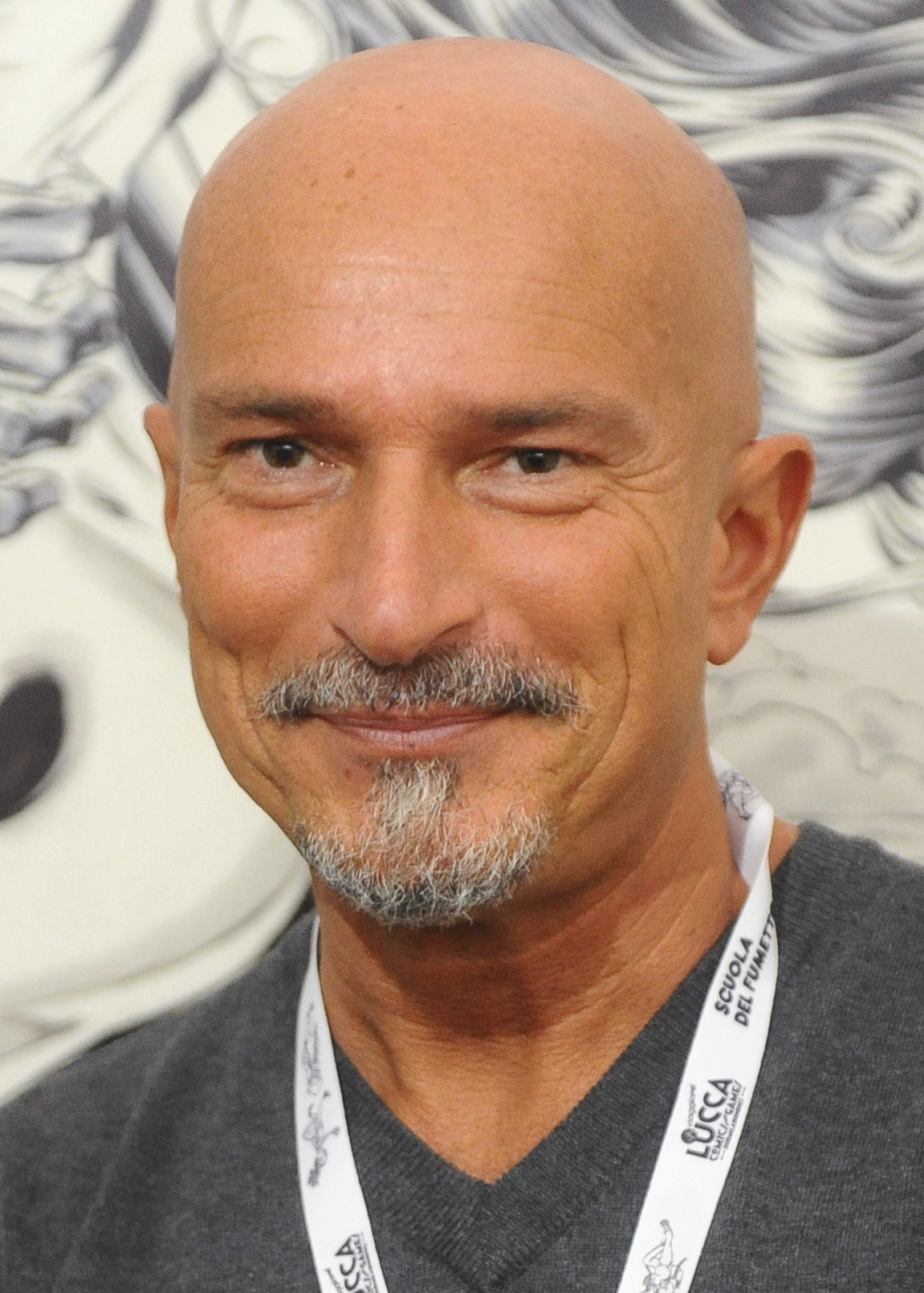
- Claudio Castellini at Lucca Comics & Games 2015
- Born: 3 March 1966 (age 60) Rome, Italy
- Areas: Penciller, Inker

Claudio Castellini (born 3 March 1966) is an Italian comic book artist.

== Biography ==
Castellini's first published work was the March 1989 episode of the Italian horror series Dylan Dog, published by Sergio Bonelli Editore. This was followed by a second Dylan Dog story in September 1990. In 1991 Castellini collaborated in the graphic elaboration of science fiction series Nathan Never, and continued drawing covers for the series until issue #59.

His first work for Marvel Comics was Silver Surfer: Dangerous Artifacts, a Silver Surfer graphic novel written by Ron Marz, published in June 1996. He produced covers for Cosmic Powers Unlimited and Elektra Magazine, drew Fantastic Four Unlimited from 1993 to 1995, and worked on the intercompany crossover miniseries DC vs. Marvel.

Castellini's other work includes Spider-Man, Conan the Barbarian and Batman: Gotham Knights. He drew the 100-page comic book one-shot Man and Superman in 2019 with writer Marv Wolfman.
