= Walrus (Marvel Comics) =

The Walrus
- Walrus

Publication information
- Publisher: Marvel Comics
- First appearance: The Defenders #131 (May 1984)
- Created by: J.M. DeMatteis; Peter Gillis; Alan Kupperberg

In-story information
- Alter ego: Hubert Carpenter
- Species: Human mutate
- Partnerships: White Rabbit
- Abilities: Minimal superhuman strength, agility and endurance Good at crossword puzzles Ability to distract enemies by making them laugh uncontrollably, hold his breath much longer than humans and survive in freezing water via his layer of blubber

The Walrus is a comedic supervillain appearing in American comic books published by Marvel Comics. He is the enemy of Spider-Man and Frog-Man.

== Publication history ==
Walrus first appeared in The Defenders #131 (May 1984) and was created by J.M. DeMatteis, Peter Gillis, and Alan Kupperberg.

== Fictional character biography ==
Walrus is a supervillain and foe of Spider-Man. He wears a costume that resembles a walrus. Despite being physically strong, he proves to be completely inept at villainy. While most supervillains are interested in stealing money or taking over the world, Walrus is content with mindless property damage;, considering his role as a supervillain as that of a "mass-destructionist".

Walrus was once a taxicab driver named Hubert Carpenter (a reference to "The Walrus and the Carpenter" poem from Through the Looking-Glass). Hubert's uncle Humbert (a mad scientist and janitor) used experimental technology to give Hubert the attributes of a walrus, which he believed would make him into an eminent supervillain. Hubert, now possessing the "proportionate speed, strength and agility of a walrus", started causing havoc. He fought the New Defenders and Frog-Man before collapsing.

Walrus allies with White Rabbit, forming the Terrible Two. They battle Spider-Man and are easily beaten. One of their common goals is to murder Frog-Man, who had humiliated them both in the past. However, Walrus proves to be incompetent and fails to kill Frog-Man.

During the Fear Itself storyline, Deadpool sees the chaos caused by the Worthy and manipulates Walrus into thinking that he has been chosen to wield a magical hammer so that he can improve his security consolation business. However, his plan goes awry when the hammer turns out to be the property of the Moon-Born, a group of werewolves. The hammer exhibits special properties under the full moon, which Deadpool discovers when he engages Walrus in battle. Deadpool tricks Walrus into entering the windowless basement of a sheriff's office, where the hammer became powerless and he could take advantage of the sheriff's weapon's cache.

Walrus partners again with White Rabbit as well as the new Goldbug for a plan that involves tampering with New York City's drinking water. The three are defeated by Spider-Woman and taken to a new supervillain prison, the Cellar, which is secretly run by Regent. Once incarcerated, Walrus and Ox are separated from the other prisoners and seemingly killed when they are sealed in power-siphoning tubes by Regent's servant Shannon Stillwell. Walrus survives and is released after Regent's defeat.

During the Hunted storyline, Walrus is among the animal-themed characters who are captured for Kraven the Hunter's Great Hunt.

== Powers and abilities ==
Hubert Carpenter has claimed to have the proportionate speed, strength, and agility of a walrus. Walrus possesses some measure of superhuman strength, agility and endurance. He was actually able to hit Spider-Man with sufficient force to knock him flying, rip a metal lamp post in half and withstand razor sharp and explosive carrots fired at him by the White Rabbit as a test. However, on another occasion, Spider-Man was able to defeat Walrus by flicking him with his index finger, which knocked him out. Walrus also has the (unintended) ability to distract his enemies by making them laugh uncontrollably with his stupid remarks.

Walrus was mutagenically altered by his uncle with walrus DNA which would presumably add certain walrus characteristics to his physiology, such as a layer of blubber to keep him warm in freezing water and the ability to hold his breath for a much longer time than a human. While none of these abilities would be very useful to a supervillain who never goes anywhere near water, the layer of blubber could explain his resistance to injury.

== Reception ==
- In 2022, CBR.com ranked Walrus 6th in their "Spider-Man's 10 Funniest Villains" list.
