= Jeanne Hovine =

Jeanne Hovine (stage name Anne-Marie Ferrières; 7 February 1888 – 30 August 1992) was an actress and the first female Belgian comics artist.

== Biography ==
Hovine was born in Brussels on February 7, 1888. From an early age, she performed in amateur theater shows alongside her mother, who was an actress. In 1924, Hovine created a text comic with her younger sister Laura called Nic et Nac, which was published in the Belgian newspaper Le Soir. The comic series garnered significant popularity and was adapted into several different languages and a series of books before the end of its publication in 1934.

From 1934 onwards, Hovine acted in various plays and appeared on the radio station INR (now RTBF). In 1973, she received the l'Ève du Théâtre award for her performance in the play L'Abdication. Hovine died in Ixelles on August 30, 1992, at the age of 104.
