= Michele Medda =

Italian comics writer (born 1962)

- Born: December 7, 1962 (age 63); Cagliari, Sardinia, Italy
- Occupation: Comics writer
- Known for: Co-creating "Nathan Never" with Antonio Serra and Bepi Vigna; - "Legs Weaver" series: Stories for "Tex," "Nick Raider," and "Dylan Dog"
- Website: Official website

Michele Medda (born 7 December 1962) is an Italian comics writer.

Medda was born in Cagliari, Sardinia. In 1991, together with Antonio Serra and Bepi Vigna, he created the science fiction series Nathan Never for Sergio Bonelli Editore. This was followed by Legs Weaver (1995-2005), set in the same fictional universe.

Medda also wrote stories for Tex, Nick Raider and Dylan Dog.
