= Nathan Never =

Comic book series

- Cover for Nathan Never #1

Publication information
- Schedule: Monthly
- Format: Ongoing series
- Genre: see below

Creative team
- Written by: Michele Medda; Antonio Serra; Bepi Vigna
- Artist(s): Claudio Castellini; Roberto De Angelis; Dante Bastianoni; Nicola Mari; Pino Rinaldi; Giancarlo Olivares; Onofrio Catacchio

Nathan Never is a black-and-white, science fiction Italian comic book, published monthly in Italy since 1991 by Sergio Bonelli Editore. It is written by Michele Medda, Antonio Serra and Bepi Vigna. Artists who worked to series include Claudio Castellini, Roberto De Angelis, Dante Bastianoni, Nicola Mari, Pino Rinaldi, Giancarlo Olivares and Onofrio Catacchio.

== Plot ==
The title character Nathan Never is a special agent in a semi-dystopian near future where crime-fighting is shared between the police and corporate detective agencies such as Never's employer Agenzia Alfa.

Stories typically merge classic urban crime, noir, and drama, with occasional forays into political thriller, survival horror, and space opera. Many issues quote classic science fiction film and literature, for example in names, locations, technology, etc. Primary sources of inspiration are Blade Runner and Isaac Asimov's Foundation series.

While most plots are self-conclusive within one or two issues, some storylines span five, ten, or even twenty issues, such as Alfa's quest to capture arch-villain Aristoteles Skotos, the Mutants' struggle to obtain equal rights, and the Earth's war with the rebelling space stations over food supplies. Continuity is a cornerstone of the series, with the effects of previous storylines accounted for and considered in subsequent plots.

== Characters ==
Never's original partner is Legs Weaver, a character inspired by Sigourney Weaver in the film Alien. Legs eventually departs Nathan Never for her own spin-off, successful comic book.

Alfa agents include:

- Nathan Never, a rogue ex-cop with a penchant for ancient things (such as books and movies); his wife was brutally murdered and his daughter is severely mentally ill as a result of the assault
- Branko, Never's new partner and a mutant fighting for equal rights
- May Frayn, former art thief, now Alfa agent and Branko's wife. She and her sisters (April and June) resemble the main characters of Cat's Eye
- Sigmund Baginov, Alfa's computer guru
- Link, an android whose looks and skills closely resemble those of Data from Star Trek: The Next Generation
- Andy Havilland, a street PI and incurable dongiovanni. Later in the serie he becomes an enemy of Nathan Never
- young triplets Melody, Harmony, and Symphony Ross, fighter pilots for Ross Aviation and Alfa affiliates
- Edward Reiser, Alfa's rough and uncompromising founder
- Solomon Darver, Alfa's manager after Reiser.
- Eliana Elmore, ex UN president and Alfa's manager after Darver

Several series regulars die in the course of Never's adventures, to be replaced by others. New characters are also introduced in the regular and in the spin-off series.

== Legacy ==
Other than the long-lived Legs, the series also inspired Agenzia Alfa (novel-length issues inclusive of all Alfa characters published twice-annually since 1994) and the short-lived Asteroide Argo (where a mining crew, including May Frayn's sister April, is marooned in another galaxy). Nathan Never itself produced numerous specials, giant issues, color issues, reprints, and almanacs. Most were published by Bonelli, with the exception of anthologies of stories selected for Arnoldo Mondadori Editore series such as Urania Fumetti and Oscar Fumetti.
