= Sidney Williams (author) =

Sidney Williams (born 1962) is an American author of six novels under his own name and three young adult novels under the pseudonym Michael August. He has also authored numerous short stories and comic book scripts. Williams received a Master of Fine Arts from Goddard College.

== Biography ==
Williams grew up and worked as a newspaper reporter in Louisiana where much of his fiction is set. One of his most popular books, Night Brothers, brought a vampire to the Louisiana landscape. He also co-authored the short story "Does the Blood Line Run on Time?" for the collection Under the Fang with fellow Louisiana writer Robert Petitt.

Williams now resides in Florida.:

== Bibliography ==
- Azarius
- Night Brothers
- Blood Hunter
- Gnelfs
- When Darkness Falls
- Midnight Eyes

=== Short stories ===
- Give it to Me Baby (Hot Blood: Deadly After Dark)
- Does the Blood Line Run on Time? (Under the Fang)
- Lucius (Chapbook)
- The Exclusive (Cemetery Dance)
- Lucifer's Lair
- Skull Rainbow with Wayne Allen Sallee (Great Britain only)
- Miss Daisy and the Rosary Pea (Crafty Cat Crimes)
- The Handbook (Plots With Guns)
- Scars (Blue Murder)
- Repast (Erotic New Orleans Stories)
- Lync (Werewolf Magazine Issue 7)
- Telephone (Soul's Road)
- Sleepers (Serialized, Paper Tape Magazine)

=== Comics ===
- The Mantus Files (Malibu Graphics)
- Sirens (Caliber)
- The Scary Book (Caliber and Silverline)
- The Dusk Society (Campfire, creator, concept and characters only)

=== As Michael August ===
- Deadly Delivery
- New Year's Evil
- The Gift
