= Legs Weaver =

- Original title: "Legs"
- Story: Michele Medda; Antonio Serra; Bepi Vigna
- Hero: Legs Weaver
- Pages: 96
- First publication: January 1995

Legs Weaver is an Italian science fiction comic book published by Sergio Bonelli Editore between 1994 and 2005.

Rebecca "Legs" Lawrence Weaver, the main character of the comic, first appeared as supporting character and sparring partner of Nathan Never (Nathan Never #1, Agente Speciale Alfa) in 1991. The main inspiration for the character were films of the Alien series and their main character Ellen Ripley, played by Sigourney Weaver.

Initially the setting of the series was to mimic that of the original Nathan Never series, as such it shares its characters. Its differentiating point was to be a more ironic and funny atmosphere to contrast the deep and involved scenery of Nathan Never.

Initially Antonio Serra took care of the comic. He introduced a number of storylines which could be read as a parody of chauvinism versus feminism. After an intermediate period during which Stefano Piani edited the stories, in 2004 a major rework of the series went through. This was in response to a noticeable decline in sales. The attempt was eventually unsuccessful and the series closed with a last episode published in October 2005.

Legs is the daughter of a solid middle-class family. During her childhood she suffered from dyslexia and dysmetria. Those conditions contributed to develop a closed and weak personality. To break away from her disappointing life, at 18 Rebecca enrolls at the Rogers Academy, a military school meant to raise future soldiers, private agents and body guards.

At the Rogers academy Rebecca shows a remarkable talent for weapons and military apparatus, however she is weak in the other subjects. She is helped in those by her roommate, Sybyl Danning. Eventually she will marry Oliver Lawrence, the founder of the academy. Her life turns upside down when she is wrongly convicted of her husband's murder.

In jail, Rebecca changes. Sexual abuse and a tough environment shape her into a harder person. It is in jail that Rebecca takes the nickname Legs. She leaves jail thanks to Edwards Reiser, an entrepreneur founder of the Alfa Agency. Reiser was on the lookout for special agent material and manages to get Legs out of jail on condition of joining his agency.

At Alfa, Legs will always be temperamental and difficult to deal with, but fair. However, as the story runs we learn that Legs has more depth. She quickly becomes Nathan Never's best friend within the agency.

Her life changes when she meets May Frayn. Initially a thief with her two sisters, she then joins the Alfa agency.

Legs is lesbian. She shares a flat with May for a while, during most of that time they are lovers. However, May cannot reconcile her love of men with her love for Legs. A new woman takes her place in Legs' life: Janet Blaise. Janet closely resembles the character of Lara Croft from Tomb Raider. Despite her deep friendship with Nathan Never, Legs was never involved romantically with him; the only intimacy they share is a French kiss in Nathan Never #100.

== Cancellation ==
Despite the attempts at revamping the series in 2004, Legs did not see a significant increase in sales. The series was cancelled with issue 119, published in October 2005. However, the Legs character did not disappear from the Nathan Never universe and was reintegrated in the series on Nathan Never special issue 16 (December 2006).
