= Bill "Tex" Henson =

American animator and story artist

Bill "Tex" Henson (July 20, 1924 - December 2, 2002) was an American animator and story artist who began his career at Disney in 1944 and later worked for Famous Studios during his early career. He is credited with having named Disney's chipmunk duo "Chip 'n' Dale". In the 1960s, he was a supervising animator on The Rocky and Bullwinkle Show.

Henson also taught art at Eastfield College near Garland and Mesquite, Texas and he also had an early career in advertising animation. In 1995 he also did some art design and writing for The Sunny Shopper a free distribution publication owned by Michael and Josh Fuller.

Henson was killed on December 2, 2002, at the age of 78, after being struck by a driver while crossing a street in Terrell, Texas.
