= Rino Albertarelli =

Italian comics artist and illustrator

- Born: 8 June 1908 Cesena
- Died: 21 September 1974 (aged 66) Milan
- Areas: Cartoonist, Artist

Rino Albertarelli (8 June 1908 – 21 September 1974) was an Italian comics artist and illustrator.

He was born in Cesena. He moved to Milan in 1928, debuting in 1935 for the comics magazines ArgentoVivo! and L'Audace. Two years later he moved to Mondadori, for which he created his most famous character, Kit Carson, as well as the series Dottor Faust and Gino e Gianni. He also worked on "Il Corsaro Nero" for Donald Duck and Other Adventures (Paperino e altre avventure). After the war he slowed his activities as a comic artist, only making a few Emilio Salgari's adaptations for the magazine Salgari and collaborating with some French magazines.

In the 1950s Albertarelli abandoned comics to focus on his activity as illustrator. In the UK, a few issues of Fleetway's Battle Picture Library, illustrated by Albertarelli, appeared in 1963 and 1964. After a long hiatus, he returned to comics in 1973 with Daim Press' series I protagonisti del West (also known just as I protagonisti), with which he collaborated until his death in Milan in 1974. The series was eventually completed by Sergio Toppi.
