= Antonio Serra (writer) =

Italian comics writer (born 1963)

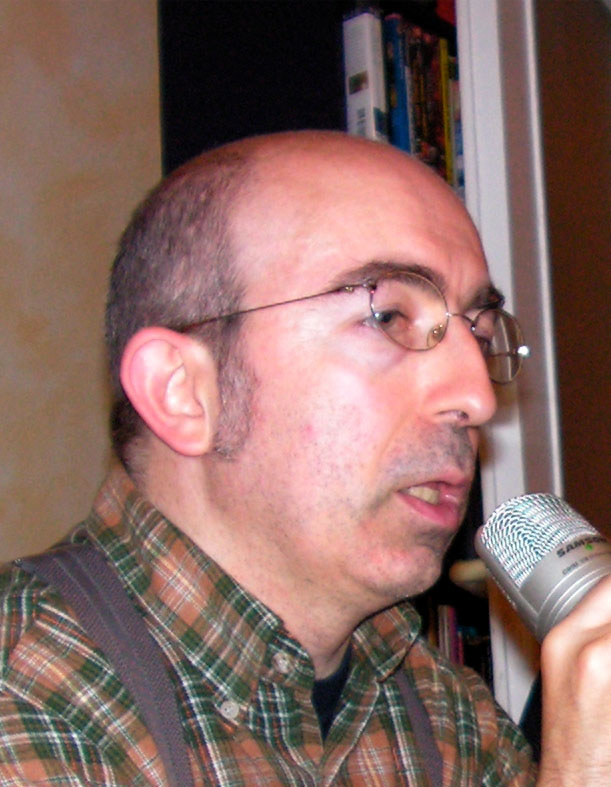
- Antonio Serra
- Born: 16 February 1963 (age 63) Alghero, Sardinia
- Area: Writer
- Awards: U Giancu's Prize, 2012

Antonio Serra (born 16 February 1963) is an Italian comics writer.

== Biography ==
Serra was born in Alghero, Sardinia. After some collaborations with amateur publications, in 1991, together with Michele Medda and Bepi Vigna, he created the science fiction series Nathan Never for Sergio Bonelli Editore, for which he had worked since 1985.

He is also the creator of two more science-fiction series, Gregory Hunter, published by Bonelli in 2000–2002, and Greystorm, published by Bonelli in 2010–2011.
