= Nina Romberg =

American novelist

- Writing career
- Pen name: Jane Archer; Nina Romberg
- Language: English language
- Period: 1978–present
- Genres: Romance novel, fantasy fiction, horror fiction
- Website: www.integritytech.com/janearch.html

Nina Romberg has been an American writer since 1978. She wrote romance novels and Indian stories under the pseudonym Jane Archer and dark fantasy/horror fiction under Nina Romberg.

== Biography ==
Nina Romberg has a degree in Graphic Design and is the former Creative Director for Book Publishers of Texas. Her first novel, Tender Torment, published in 1978, sold half a million copies. She is a Romantic Times Lifetime Achievement Award finalist.

== Bibliography ==
=== As Jane Archer ===
==== Single novels ====
- Tender Torment (1978)
- Rebellious Rapture (1980)
- Spring Dreams (1983)
- Satin and Silver (1986)
- Hidden Passions (1987)
- Captive Dreams (1988)
- Captive Desire (1989)
- Rebel Seduction (1990)
- Bayou Passion (1991)
- Wild Wind! (1993)
- Silken Spurs (1993)
- Out of the West (1996)
- Maverick Moon (1997)

==== Indian stories ====
- Texas Indian Myths and Legends (2000)
- The First Fire (2004)

=== As Nina Romberg ===
==== Marian Winchester Series ====
1. The Spirit Stalker (1989)
2. Shadow Walkers (1993)
