= 1994 in comics =

Notable events of 1994 in comics.

== Events ==
=== Year overall ===
- Huge changes in the North American marketplace (mostly due to the collapse of the speculation market) force many retailers and small publishers out of business. Aircel Comics, Apple Comics, Attic Books, Axis Comics, Blackball Comics, Comic Zone Productions, Continuity Comics, Continüm Comics, Dagger Enterprises, Eternity Comics, Fantagor Press, NOW Comics, Revolutionary Comics, Imperial Comics, Innovation Corporation, Majestic Entertainment, Ominous Press, Silver Moon Comics, and Triumphant Comics all cease publishing. All the same, a number of publishers debut, including Axis Comics, Big Bang Comics, Chaos! Comics, Crusade Comics, Event Comics, Les 400 coups, Mojo Press, Ominous Press, Re-Visionary Press, and Sirius Entertainment.

=== January ===
- January 2: Peter de Wit's gag-a-day comic Sigmund, which debuted a year earlier in the Flemish newspaper Het Laatste Nieuws under the different title Mijnheerke Psi, is now published in the Dutch newspaper Het Parool, where it will remain a mainstay for decades to come.
- January 14: Eagle (1982 series), with issue #574, canceled by Fleetway.
- Iron Man #300: The Iron Legion vs. Ultimo, written by Len Kaminski.
- Kyle Rayner is introduced as a new Green Lantern.
- Avengers West Coast is canceled by Marvel Comics with issue #102.

=== February ===
- February 7: Dick Tracy characters Dick Tracy and Tess Trueheart go through a divorce, which becomes a big media story. The couple is eventually reunited.
- Captain America #425 is the debut of the 12-part storyline "The Fighting Chance."
- She-Hulk vol. 2 is canceled with issue #60. The caption on the cover reads: "O.K., kids, we had a deal.... now hand over those X-Men comics!"
- First issue of The Sandman: The kindly ones, by Neil Gaiman and Marc Hempel (DC comics).
- In À suivre, first chapter of L’enfant penchée, by Benoît Peeters and François Schuiten.
- La voce nella tempesta (The voice in the storm) – by Claudio Nizzi and Aurelio Galeppini. For the 400th issue of Tex Willer, the legendary Galep draws his last album, appeared on newsstands a few days before his death. Prophetically, the cover shows the hero bidding farewell to the reader.

=== March ===
- March 19: U.S. comic artist Mike Diana becomes the first cartoonist in the United States to be convicted according to obscenity laws, complete with a ban to continue drawing his infamous comic series Boiled Angel.
- X-Men vol. 2, #30: Scott Summers marries Jean Grey. (Marvel Comics)
- Marc Spector: Moon Knight is canceled by Marvel with issue #60.
- X-Men crossover "Child's Play" begins.

=== April ===
- The final episode of Murray Ball's gag comic Footrot Flats is published.
- X-Men crossover "Child's Play" concludes.
- Starblast concludes, both as a limited series and as a crossover.

=== May ===
- May 30 - July 31: Carl Barks travels to Europe in an official, heavily mediatized visit, where he meets several Disney comics publishers in various countries.
- The Incredible Hulk issue #417 features Rick Jones’ infamous stag party in which the Marvel heroes discover that Jones’ fiancée was an adult film star.
- early webcomic NetBoy is first uploaded to the World Wide Web.
- The cirlces of power by Pierre Christin and Jean-Claude Mézières (Dargaud).

=== June ===
- Action Comics #700: 68-page anniversary issue. "The Fall of Metropolis" ("Triangle" chapter 24). One of Curt Swan's final Superman jobs.
- Conan the Barbarian returns to comics with two titles: Conan the Adventurer and Conan Classic (reprinting the early stories from the 1970s)
- The Incredible Hulk issue #418 is Rick and Marlo Chandler's wedding issue with an appearance by DC Comics’ character Death. Written by Peter David, with art by Gary Frank and Cam Smith.
- Thor reaches issue #475 and re-introduces Donald Blake, Thor's first secret identity, and romantic interest Jane Foster. Thor also gets a new armor and costume.
- A second attempt to launch a Lucky Luke monthly magazine is made, which will run until January 1995.

=== July ===
- Quasar is canceled by Marvel with issue #60.

=== August ===
- August 29: The Dutch comics magazine Sjors and Sjimmie Weekblad changes its name again into Sjosji. It will continue until 1998, after which it becomes Striparazzi.
- DC Comics launches the Zero Month promotion.
- The Incredible Hulk #420: "Lest Darkness Come," by Peter David, Gary Frank, and Cam Smith. Jim Wilson dies of AIDS.

=== September ===
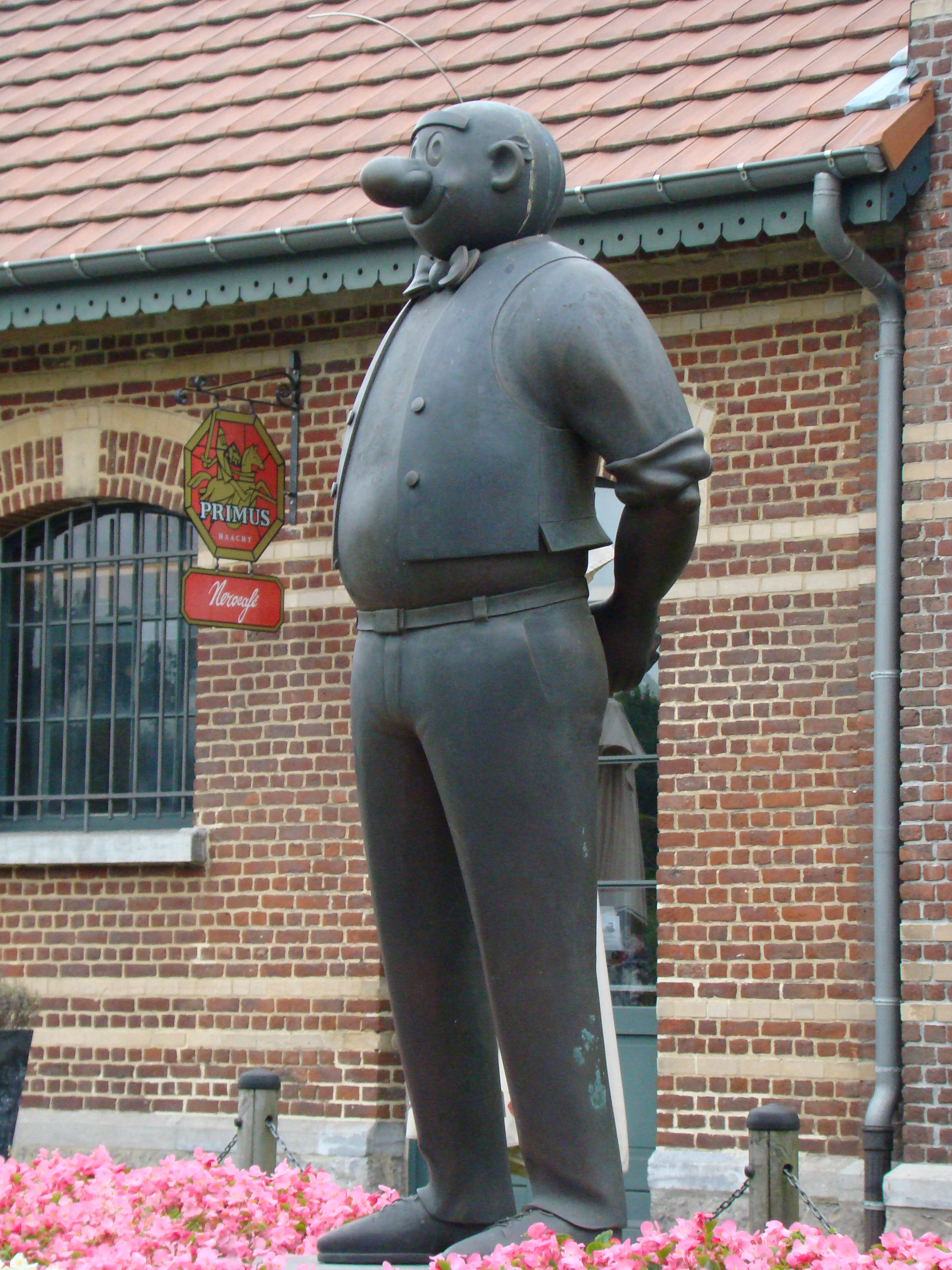
Statue of Nero in Hoeilaart, hometown of Marc Sleen and Nero

- September 10: In Hoeilaart, Belgium, Nero receives a statue.
- L.E.G.I.O.N. is canceled by DC with issue #70.
- Justice League International vol. 2 is canceled by DC with issue #68.
- "Phalanx Covenant," an X-Men crossover storyline, begins.
- Il dito nella piaga (The salt in the wound) – by Claudio Nizzi and Bruno Ramella; the past and the family story of Nick Raider are revealed.
- Il passato di Carson (Kit Carson’s past) – by Mauro Boselli and Carlo Marcello (Tex Willer series)

=== October ===
- October 13: Harvey Pekar and Joyce Brabner publish Our Cancer Year, a graphic novel about Pekar's cancer diagnosis and treatment.
- October 15–16: During the Stripdagen in Breda, the Netherlands, Don Lawrence (Storm, Trigië), receives the Stripschapprijs. Peter Kuipers and Mat Schifferstein of publishing company Sherpa receive the Jaarprijs voor Bijzondere Verdiensten (nowadays the P. Hans Frankfurtherprijs).
- Daniel Clowes' The Sensual Santa is prepublished in Eightball.
- The Spider-Man Clone Saga begins. (Marvel Comics)

=== November ===
- Marvel Comics abolishes the position of editor-in-chief, replacing Tom DeFalco with five group editors-in-chief. Rather than name a successor, the company appoints five "Editors-in-Chief," each of whom oversees a certain number of titles, collected into broad groups: the X-Men titles (Bob Harras), the Spider-Man titles (Bob Budiansky), so-called "Marvel Universe" titles (Mark Gruenwald), the newly created Marvel Edge (Bobbie Chase), and licensed-property titles (Carl Potts).
- Marvel Tales (1966 series), the long-running reprint title (primarily of Spider-Man stories), is canceled with issue #291.
- November 3: Marvel Comics purchases Malibu Comics

=== December ===
- December 9: The first Inktspot awards for Best Political Cartoon are held in The Netherlands. The first winner is Peter van Straaten, who will win the award four times more in the future.
- X-Men #41 is the prologue to the Age of Apocalypse with Legion murdering Professor X.
- G.I. Joe: A Real American Hero, published by Marvel Comics, is canceled with issue #155.
- On Ken Parker magazine, Immagini by Giancarlo Berardi and Calo Ambrosini, team-up between Ken Parker and Dylan Dog.
- December 28: Marvel Comics purchases distributor Heroes World Distribution.

=== Specific date unknown ===
- Belgian comic artist Mic Delinx is knighted as a Chevalier in the Ordre des Arts et des Lettres.
- Heidi MacDonald, Trina Robbins, Deni Loubert, Anina Bennett, Liz Schiller and Jackie Estrada establish Friends of Lulu, a non-profit organization to promote readership of comic books by women and the participation of women in the comic book industry.

== Deaths ==
=== January ===
- January 5: Joop Du Buy, Dutch animator, textile salesman and comics artist (Appie Kim, Nimfke en de Nonnenneuker), dies at age 59.
- January 17: Reamer Keller, American cartoonist and comics artist (Kennesaw, Medicare), dies at age 89.
- January 25: Filip Fermin, Dutch comics artist (Robur & Hanekamp), dies at age 46.
- January 28: Richard Doxsee, American comic artist (ghosted Let's Explore Your Mind, drew various romance, war, mystery and western comics), dies at age 64.

=== February ===
- February 6: Jack Kirby, American comic book writer and artist (Marvel Comics, DC Comics), dies at age 76.
- February 10: Mel Calman, British illustrator and comics artist (The Little Man), dies from a heart attack at age 62.
- February 18: Rodlow Willard, American comic artist (worked on King of the Royal Mounted, continued Scorchy Smith), dies at age 87.
- Specific date in February unknown: T.M. Maple, real name: Jim Burke, Canadian comics fan who gained popularity through his frequent and prozaic letters to comics fanzines, dies from a heart attack at age 37 or 38.

=== March ===
- March 10:
  - Aurelio Galleppini, Italian comics artist (Tex Willer), dies at the age of 76.
  - Reuben Timmins, American animator and comics artist (comics starring Laurel & Hardy), dies at the age of 84.
- March 15: Nadir Quinto, Italian comics artist (Tom Boy, Swea, I Delfini, Jacopo del Mare, Vele Capitani, continued Larry Yuma, dies at age 75.
- March 19: René Deynis, French illustrator, comics artist and writer (wrote Les Espadons, drew Oscar Mittoman, Albator, continued Jean et Jeanette, Jacques Flash), dies at age 63.
- March 22: Walter Lantz, American comics artist and animator (Woody Woodpecker), dies at age 94.
- March 31: José Escobar Saliente, Spanish animator, comics writer and artist (Carpanta, Zipi y Zape), dies at age 85.
- Specific date unknown: Jack Dunkley, British comics artist (The Larks, Patsy, Mr. Digwell), dies at age 87.

=== April ===
- April 5: Kurt Cobain, American rock singer and guitarist (made some comics in his diaries, which were posthumously released), commits suicide at age 27.
- April 9: Keith Watson, British comics artist (Dan Dare, Roel Dijkstra), dies at age 59.

=== May ===
- May 1: John Milton Morris, American political cartoonist and comics artist (Neighbourly Neighbors, continued Scorchy Smith), dies at age 87.
- May 6: Murray Boltinoff, American comics writer and editor (DC Comics), dies at age 83.
- May 9: Reinhold Escher, German comics artist (Mecki), dies at age 89.
- May 16: Dorul van der Heide, Dutch painter and comics artists (worked for Rolf Kauka), dies at age 90.
- May 22: Mitacq, Belgian comics artist (La Patrouille des Castors), dies at age 66.
- May 23: Don Thompson, American comics writer, critic, collector and co-editor of the comics magazine Comics Buyer's Guide, dies at age 58.
- May 24: Julien Hébert, Canadian architect, industrial designer and comics artist (Mouchette), dies at age 76.
- May 25: Jan de Poel, Dutch illustrator and comics artist (Muisje Wit, Trippie), dies at age 89.
- May 26: Nico Oeloff, Dutch painter and comics artist (Kopkewoartel), dies at age 75.

=== June ===
- June 1: Bob Leguay, French illustrator and comics artist (worked for Publi-Vog and Bédé Adult), dies at age 67.
- June 10: Jack Hannah, American animator and comics artist (Donald Duck), dies at age 81.
- June 21: Neal Pozner, American comics writer and editor (DC Comics), dies at age 38 or 39 from AIDS.
- June 23: Piet van Elk, Dutch comics artist and animator (De Avonturen van Bim, Dokie Durf), dies at age 74.
- June 28: Richard Bickenbach, American animator and comics artist (Hanna-Barbera comics), dies at age 86.

=== July ===
- July 4: Alfred Harvey, American comics artist and publisher (Harvey Comics), dies at age 80.
- July 21: Marijac, French comics artist (Jim Boum, Les Trois Mousquetaires du Maquis, Jules Barigoule) and writer (Colonel X), dies at age 85.
- July 23: Owen Fitzgerald, American animator and comics artist (celebrity comics based on Martin & Lewis and Bob Hope, continued Dennis the Menace, Disney comics), dies at age 77.

=== August ===
- August 1: Augstí Ascensio Saurí, aka Asen, Spanish animator and comics artist (Nicasso, Pintor Moderno, Tarzán 1990, Los Birimboyas), dies at age 45 in a car accident.
- August 13: Richard Klokkers, Dutch comics artist (Marten Toonder Studios), dies at age 70.
- August 23: Jean-Claude Gal, French comics artist (Les Armées du Conquérant), dies at age 52.
- August 24: Wijnanda Nanny Aberson, Dutch writer and comics writer (wrote the script of the very first Kapitein Rob story), dies at age 82.
- August 26: Werner Klemke, German illustrator, animator and comics artist (Burattino im Puppentheater des Carabas Barabas), dies at age 77.
- August 28: Charlie Delhauteur, Belgian comic artist (made comics and illustrations for Les Bonnes Soirées, Le Moustique, Spirou and Risque-Tout, assisted on Buck Danny), dies at age 75.

=== September ===
- September 5: Yvette Lapointe, Canadian comics artist (Les Petits Espiègles), dies at age 82.
- September 11: Ben Jansen, Dutch comics artist (De Glunderende Gluurder, a sex parody of Suske en Wiske), dies at the age of 39.
- September 12: Dick De Wilde, aka W. Gerritsen or W. Gerr, Dutch comics artist, illustrator and graphic designer (assistant of Hans G. Kresse, made his own comic Victo van Turenne), dies at age 89.
- September 21: Jef De Wulf, French comics artist (published in the magazine Junior Adventures), dies at age 78.
- September 22: Bud Sagendorf, American comics artist (assisted on and continuedPopeye), dies from brain cancer at age 79.
- September 24: Jan van Reek, Dutch comic writer and artist, (Wipperoen), dies at age 70.

=== October ===
- October 5: Doug Wildey, American comics artist and animator (The Outlaw Kid and the newspaper comic based on The Saint), dies at age 72.
- October 5: Frank Ridgeway, American comics artist and writer (Mr. Abernathy, Lancelot), dies at age 63 or 64.
- October 14: Jack Tippit, American comics artist (Doctor Bill, Sergeant Pepper, continued Amy and Henry), dies at age 70.
- October 17: Rik van Bentum, Dutch painter and comics artist (made an obscure comic strip, New Comic Strip Scandal 2000, together with novelist Jan Cremer), dies at age 57.
- October 18: Manoel Messias de Mello, Brazilian comics artist (Pão Duro, Gibimha, Audaz, o Demolidor), dies at age 88.
- October 26: Francis, Belgian comics artist (Marc Lebut et son Voisin, Capitaine Lahuche, Les Soldats de Plomb), dies at age 57.

=== November ===
- November 2: Martin Taras, American animator and comics artist (made comics based on Famous Studios characters), dies at age 80.
- November 8: Michael O'Donoghue, American comics writer, TV writer, novelist and publisher (The Adventures of Phoebe Zeit-Geist, National Lampoon), dies at age 54.
- November 15: Janet Ahlberg, British illustrator and comics artist, dies from breast cancer at age 50.
- November 28: Frank Robbins, American comics artist and writer (Johnny Hazard), dies at age 77.

=== December ===
- December 1: Romain Deconinck, Belgian actor, comedian and theatre director (co-scripted the comic book De Roâste Wassger), dies at age 78.
- December 2: Tony Weare, British comics artist (Matt Marriott), dies at age 82.
- December 7: Rafael Astarita, American illustrator and comics artist (drew comics for National Comics Publications, Fiction House), dies at age 82.
- December 8: Sidney A. Quinn, American illustrator, painter and comics artist (continued The Timbertoes and Goofus and Gallant), dies at age 79 or 80.
- December 14: Lucien Nortier, French comics artist (various realistically drawn comics, continued Bob L'Ardent), dies at age 62.
- December 18: Albert-Georges Badert, French comics artist (continued Les Pieds Nickelés), dies at age 79.

=== Specific date unknown ===
- Bob Forgione, American comics artist (comics for Fawcett Comics, Charlton Comics, Dell Comics and DC Comics), dies at age 64 or 65.
- Rein van Looy, Dutch comics artist and illustrator (Dick Parker), dies at age 83 or 84.
- Geert van Wanrooij, Dutch illustrator and comic artist (De Nieuwste Avonturen van Jan Klaassen), dies at age 77 or 78.

== Conventions ==
- February 11–13: Great Eastern Conventions New York I (Jacob K. Javits Convention Center, New York City) — guests include Arthur Adams, Murphy Anderson, Dick Ayers, Terry Austin, Mark Bagley, Jim Balent, Tony Bedard, Tom and Mary Bierbaum, Barry Blair, Ruben Bolling, John Byrne, Rich Buckler, Jim Califiore, Jim Callahan, George Caragonne, Richard Case, Paul Castiglia, Paul Chadwick, Bernard Chang, Howard Chaykin, David Chelsea, Sean Chen, Mark Chiarello, Jan Childress, Ernie Colón, Gene Colan, Amanda Conner, Howard Cruse, Paris Cullins, Geoff Darrow, Peter David, Dan Decarlo, Mike DeCarlo, Kim DeMulder, Steve Dillon, Chuck Dixon, Evan Dorkin, Chris Claremont, Dave Dorman, Steve Ellis, Garth Ennis, Mike Esposito, Lee Falk, Bob Fingerman, Robert Loren Fleming, Sandu Florea, Greg Fox, José Luis García-López, Ron Garney, Nat Gertler, Vince Giarrano, Dave Gibbons, Keith Giffen, Tom Gill, Dick Giordano, Stan Goldberg, Richard Goldwater, Gene Gonzales, Jorge Gonzalez, Archie Goodwin, Victor Gorelick, Dan Gottlieb, Ron Goulart, Steven Grant, Gary Guzzo, Lurene Haines, Cully Hamner, Scott Hampton, Scott Hanna, Irwin Hasen, Fred Haynes, Don Heck, David Hillman, Dave Hoover, Jed Hotchkiss, Kevin Hopgood, Stephen Hughes, Dave Hunt, Greg Hyland, Mark Hyman, Janet Jackson, Dan Jurgens, Michael Kaluta, Len Kaminsky, Gil Kane, Jay Kennedy, Hannibal King, Scott Kolins, Adam Kubert, Andy Kubert, David Lapham, Batton Lash, Carol Lay, Bob Layton, Jae Lee, Rick Leonardi, Joseph Michael Linsner, Aaron Lopresti, Frank Lovece, John Lowe, Tom Lyle, Mike Manley, Ron Marz, Bob McLeod, Mark McKenna, Frank McLaughlin, Shawn McManus, Mike Mignola, Frank Miller, Bernie Mireault, Steve Mitchell, Rags Morales, Tom Morgan, Will Murray, Josh Myers, Fabian Nicieza, Graham Nolan, Michael Avon Oeming, Kevin O'Neill, Jerry Ordway, Richard Pace, Tom Palmer, Jimmy Palmiotti, Jeff Parker, Rick Parker, Ande Parks, Don Perlin, Joe Phillips, Adam Pollina, George Pratt, Brian Pulido, Joe Quesada, Alan Rabinowitz, Ted Rall, Tom Raney, Ralph Reese, James Robinson, Adrienne Roy, John Rozum, Paul Ryan, Julius Schwartz, David Scroggy, Steven T. Seagle, Val Semeiks, Eric Shanower, Jim Shooter, Louise Simonson, Walter Simonson, Will Simpson, Ted Slampyak, Bob Smith, Frank Springer, Jim Starlin, Arne Starr, Alec Stevens, William Stout, Larry Stroman, Arthur Suydam, Art Thibert, Anthony Tollin, Kevin VanHook, Tom Veitch, Charles Vess, Matt Wagner, Lee Weeks, Alan Weiss, David Wenzel, Mark Wheatley, Bob Wiacek, Mike Wieringo, Kent Williams, Gahan Wilson, Barry Windsor-Smith, Marv Wolfman, John Workman, Berni Wrightson, and Mike Zeck
- March 13: Great Eastern Conventions (Marriott Hotel, Bloomington, Minnesota) — 400 attendees
- March 25–27: Motor City Comic Con (Novi Expo Center, Michigan)
- April: Pittsburgh Comicon (Monroeville, Pennsylvania) — first iteration of the show
- April 20–21: Pro/Con 2 (Oakland Convention Center, Oakland, California)
- April 22–24: WonderCon (Oakland Convention Center, Oakland, California)
- May 2–3: Capital City Trade Show (St. Louis, Missouri) — guests include Dave Sim
- Summer: CAPTION (Oxford Union Society, Oxford, England) — Sex & Drugs & Rock'n'Roll theme; guests include Hunt Emerson, Pete Loveday, and Bryan Talbot
- June 3–5: Stripdagen Haarlem (Haarlem, The Netherlands)
- June 4–5: Great Eastern Conventions New York II — "New York Comicon" (Jacob K. Javits Convention Center, New York City) — guests include Howard Chaykin, Walter Simonson, Jim Starlin
- June 4: Alternative Press Expo (Parkside Hall, San Jose, California) — first annual iteration of APE
- June 5: Great Eastern Conventions Chicago (Hyatt Regency Woodfield, Schaumburg, Illinois)
- June 5: Great Eastern Conventions Pittsburgh (Sheraton at Station Square, Pittsburgh, Pennsylvania)
- June 5: Great Eastern Conventions San Francisco (Holiday Inn Golden Gateway, San Francisco, California)
- June 10: Small Press Expo (Bethesda Ramada Inn, Bethesda, Maryland) — first annual iteration of SPX; guests include Dave Sim
- June 12–14: Diamond Seminar (Baltimore Convention Center, Baltimore, Maryland) — guests include Dave Sim
- June 12: Great Eastern Conventions Miami (Crown Sterling Suites, Miami, Florida)
- June 12: Great Eastern Conventions Minneapolis (Marriot Bloomington, Bloomington, Illinois)
- June 12: Great Eastern Conventions St. Louis (Holiday Inn Linbergh Exit, St. Louis, Missouri)
- June 17–19: Atlanta Fantasy Fair (Holiday Inn Crowne Plaza, Atlanta, Georgia) — official guests include Sarah Douglas, Bruce Campbell, Jeff Rector, Geraint Wyn Davies, John A. Russo, Ted V. Mikels
- June 17–19: Heroes Convention (Charlotte Convention Center, Charlotte, North Carolina) — guests include Jim Lee, Mike Mignola, Gil Kane, Joe Madureira, Jeff Smith, John Romita Sr. and John Romita Jr.
- June 17–19: New York Comic Fest (Jacob K. Javits Convention Center)
- June 26: Great Eastern Conventions Boston (57 Park Plaza Hotel, Boston, Massachusetts)
- June 26: Great Eastern Conventions Denver (Holiday Inn, Denver, Colorado)
- July 3–5: Chicago Comicon (Rosemont Expo Center, Chicago, Illinois) — 20,000+ attendees; guest of honor: Harlan Ellison; special guest: James O'Barr
- July 15–17: Dragon Con/Atlanta Comics Expo (Atlanta Hilton & Tower/Westin Peachtree Plaza/Atlanta Civic Center, Atlanta, Georgia) — 11,000 attendees
- July 29–31: Dallas Fantasy Fair (Dallas Market Hall Convention Center) — guests include Dave Sim and Martin Wagner
- August 4–7, San Diego Comic-Con (San Diego Convention Center and Hyatt Regency, San Diego, California) — 31,000 attendees; special guests include Mike Allred, David Brin, Dave Dorman, Al Feldstein, Rick Geary, Stan Goldberg, Roberta Gregory, Matt Groening, Chad Grothkopf, Lurene Haines, Dan Jurgens, Frank Miller, Leonard Nimoy, James O'Barr, Lucius Shepard, J. Michael Straczynski, Rumiko Takahashi, and Jean-Claude Van Damme
- August 20: Marvel Mega Tour (Meadowlands Convention Center, Secaucus, New Jersey)
- September: Small Press Expo (Bethesda Ramada Inn, Bethesda, Maryland) — first iteration of this show
- September 10–11: OrlandoCon (Clarion Towers, Orlando, Florida) — produced by retailer Mike Kott; guests include Jim Ivey and Martin Nodell
- October 21–23: Philadelphia Comic Book Spectacular (Pennsylvania Convention Center, Philadelphia, Pennsylvania) — 200 exhibitors; guests include Stan Lee. Charity auction to benefit St. Jude's Hospital and Goodwill Industries.
- October 22–23: Toronto Comic Book Extravaganza (Canadian Exposition & Convention Centre, Toronto, Canada)
- November 26–27: Mid-Ohio Con (Columbus, Ohio) — 15th anniversary show; special guests: Sergio Aragonés, John Byrne, Dick DeBartolo, Dick Giordano, Tony Isabella, Joe Jusko, William Messner-Loebs, P. Craig Russell, Stan Sakai, Louise Simonson, Walter Simonson, Don Simpson, Jeff Smith, Roger Stern, Jim Valentino, and Mark Waid; other guests include: Darryl Banks, Dennis Cramer, Kevin Dooley, Matt Feazell, Bob Ingersoll, Steve Lieber, Mike Okamoto, Beau Smith, Chris Sprouse

== First issues by title ==
=== DC Comics ===
- Anima
- Aquaman
- Batman: Castle of the Bat – Elseworlds
- Detective Comics Annual #7
- Damage
- Deathstroke Annual #3
- Gunfire
- R.E.B.E.L.S. '94
- Shadow Cabinet – Milestone Comics imprint
- Starman
- Superman: The Feral Man of Steel
- Worlds Collide – Milestone Comics imprint
- Xombi – Milestone Comics imprint
- Zero Hour

==== Vertigo Comics ====
- The Invisibles

=== Image Comics ===
- Boof

=== Marvel Comics ===
Force Works

Release: July. Writers: Dan Abnett and Andy Lanning. Art: Tom Tenney and Rey Garcia. Summary: The West Coast Avengers are reborn as Force Works. Financed by Iron Man, the group welcomes a new member called Legacy.

Generation X

Release: October. Writer: Scott Lobdell. Artists: Chris Bachalo and Mark Buckingham. Summary: Banshee and Emma Frost bring new, young mutants to Xavier's School for Higher Learning. X-Men member Jubilee is part of the group along with Gateway, M, Skin, Husk, Chamber, Synch, and Speedball.

Marvels

Nightwatch

=== Small press titles ===
- The Biologic Show, by Al Columbia, Fantagraphics Books
- Underwater, by Chester Brown, Drawn & Quarterly. First issue: August
- César and Jessica, in France

=== Shueisha ===
Chorus

Release: May.
