= Great Eastern Conventions =

Defunct entertainment company

- Founded: 1977; 49 years ago
- Founder: Frederic Greenberg
- Defunct: c. 1996; 30 years ago
- Headquarters: Ringoes, New Jersey
- Key people: Nancy Greenberg
- Services: Comic book conventions

Great Eastern Conventions, Inc. was an entertainment company that produced comic book conventions, most actively from 1987 to 1996. In New York City, the Great Eastern shows filled the gap between the mid-1980s demise of the annual Comic Art Convention and Creation Conventions, and the establishment of promoter Michael Carbonaro's annual Big Apple Comic Con in 1996. From 1993 to 1995, Great Eastern hosted two New York City shows annually at the Jacob K. Javits Convention Center. In addition to running shows in the Northeastern United States, Great Eastern also ran shows in Georgia, Florida, California, Oregon, Minnesota, and Texas.

Great Eastern was founded in 1977 by New Jersey–based promoter Frederic Greenberg and his wife Nancy.

== History ==
Greenberg, a comic book fan himself, began hosting conventions in 1977 after he discovered that there weren't regular shows in his area of Mount Laurel, New Jersey.

From 1983 to 1987, Great Eastern hosted monthly conventions in Mount Laurel, routinely drawing between 150 and 175 people. Originally based in Boonton, New Jersey, by 1989 the company had moved its offices to Ringoes, New Jersey.

By 1990, Great Eastern was running one-day shows weekly throughout the Northeastern United States, as well as larger shows in cities like San Francisco, Tampa, and Atlanta. The GEC June 1990 convention at the New York Penta Hotel was billed as "the biggest show of the year." In June 1994, GEC hosted one-day conventions in Chicago, Pittsburgh, San Francisco (all on June 5), Minneapolis, St. Louis, Miami (all on June 12), Boston, and Denver (both on June 26).

Great Eastern hosted comic book conventions in South Florida from 1990 to 1994. Venues included the Howard Johnson Hotel—North Miami Beach, (Note: The Howard Johnson Hotel—North Miami Beach is no longer in existence; it was demolished in the early 2000s.) the Marriott Hotel—Coral Gables, and the Marriott Hotel—Hialeah Gardens. (Note: The Marriott Hotel—Hialeah Gardens is no longer in existence; the property was sold and renamed under another hotel chain in the late 1990s.) Featured guests varied based on availability, such as Stan Lee, Todd McFarlane, George Pérez, Rob Liefeld, Jim Starlin, John Beatty, Pat Broderick, Martin Nodell, Joe Staton, Mike Zeck, Dick Giordano. Great Eastern pulled out of South Florida after 1994 as a result of after-effects from Hurricane Andrew's impact in August 1992.

In 1992, Great Eastern Conventions partnered with Cerebus creator Dave Sim in promoting small conventions in over 20 U.S. locations, including Indiana, Oregon, Texas, as well as in South Florida.

From 1993 to 1995, Great Eastern hosted two large-scale conventions annually at the Jacob K. Javits Convention Center and the New York Coliseum, which were dubbed "The New York Comic Book Spectacular." The February 1994 show was affected by a large winter storm which forced about one-fifth of the special guests to cancel their appearances. Great Eastern mounted a "Philadelphia Comic Book Spectacular" in October 1994; Greenberg was soon sued by David Greenhill, promoter of Philadelphia's Comicfest '93, for scheduling the Philadelphia Comic Book Spectacular the same weekend as Greenhill's planned Comicfest '94.

Despite their large fan attendance and expansive venues, Great Eastern's large shows were criticized by many within the industry for pandering to dealers and spectacle. As frequent participant Evan Dorkin stated, "The New York shows are extremely unfriendly to both creators and fans. . . . There is limited programming, limited professional appearances at these shows."

In March 1996, Greenberg, at a very late point, canceled what had been advertised as a larger-than-usual Great Eastern show, scheduled to be held at the New York Coliseum on 59th Street and Columbus Circle. As a substitute event, comic book retailer Michael Carbonaro and others on the spur of the moment mounted the first Big Apple Comic Con. Greenberg and Great Eastern Conventions disappeared from the fan convention circuit from that moment forward.

=== Publications ===
Greenberg also published two magazines that covered the comics industry, Comic Book Week (est. 1993) and Comic Talk. In mid-1993 he had to cut down the frequency of both publications due to the slowdown in the industry.

=== Convention dates and locations ===
Dates	Location	Venue	Official guests	Notes
February 22, 1987	Mount Laurel, New Jersey	Budget Motor Lodge		c. 175 attendees; five dealers and about 25 exhibitor tables
January 6-7, 1989	New York City			
April 1, 1990	Albany, New York	Albany Marriott		
April 8, 1990	San Francisco	Sheraton S.F. Airport Hotel		
April 29, 1990	Tampa, Florida	Holiday Inn Ashley Plaza		
May 6, 1990	Atlanta	Colony Square Hotel		
May 12, 1990	Boston	57 Park Plaza Hotel		
June 1-3, 1990	New York City	New York Penta Hotel		
July 12, 1992	Indianapolis, Indiana	Sheraton-Indianapolis Hotel	Dave Sim	
November 1, 1992	Portland, Oregon	Marriott Hotel	Dave Sim	
December 13, 1992	Houston, Texas	Sheraton Grand Hotel	Dave Sim	
January 23–24, 1993	New York City	Jacob K. Javits Convention Center	Wendy & Richard Pini (launching their Elfquest '93 Tour)	
April 3–4, 1993	New York City	New York Coliseum		
June 12–13, 1993	New York City	Jacob K. Javits Convention Center		
February 11–13, 1994	New York City	Jacob K. Javits Convention Center	Arthur Adams, Murphy Anderson, Dick Ayers, Terry Austin, Mark Bagley, Jim Balent, Tony Bedard, Tom and Mary Bierbaum, Barry Blair, Ruben Bolling, John Byrne, Rich Buckler, Jim Califiore, Jim Califiore, Jim Callahan, George Caragonne, Richard Case, Paul Castiglia, Paul Chadwick, Bernard Chang, Howard Chaykin, David Chelsea, Sean Chen, Mark Chiarello, Jan Childress, Ernie Colón, Gene Colan, Amanda Conner, Howard Cruse, Paris Cullins, Geoff Darrow, Peter David, Dan Decarlo, Mike DeCarlo, Kim DeMulder, Steve Dillon, Chuck Dixon, Evan Dorkin, Chris Claremont, Dave Dorman, Steve Ellis, Garth Ennis, Mike Esposito, Lee Falk, Bob Fingerman, Robert Loren Fleming, Sandu Florea, Greg Fox, José Luis García-López, Ron Garney, Nat Gertler, Vince Giarrano, Dave Gibbons, Keith Giffen, Tom Gill, Dick Giordano, Stan Goldberg, Richard Goldwater, Gene Gonzales, Jorge Gonzalez, Archie Goodwin, Victor Gorelick, Dan Gottlieb, Ron Goulart, Steven Grant, Gary Guzzo, Lurene Haines, Cully Hamner, Scott Hampton, Scott Hanna, Irwin Hasen, Fred Haynes, Don Heck, David Hillman, Dave Hoover, Jed Hotchkiss, Kevin Hopgood, Stephen Hughes, Dave Hunt, Greg Hyland, Mark Hyman, Janet Jackson, Dan Jurgens, Michael Kaluta, Len Kaminsky, Gil Kane, Jay Kennedy, Hannibal King, Scott Kolins, Adam Kubert, Andy Kubert, David Lapham, Batton Lash, Carol Lay, Bob Layton, Jae Lee, Rick Leonardi, Joseph Michael Linsner, Aaron Lopresti, Frank Lovece, John Lowe, Tom Lyle, Mike Manley, Ron Marz, Bob McLeod, Mark McKenna, Frank McLaughlin, Shawn McManus, Mike Mignola, Frank Miller, Bernie Mireault, Steve Mitchell, Rags Morales, Tom Morgan, Will Murray, Josh Myers, Fabian Nicieza, Graham Nolan, Michael Avon Oeming, Kevin O'Neill, Jerry Ordway, Richard Pace, Tom Palmer, Jimmy Palmiotti, Jeff Parker, Rick Parker, Ande Parks, Don Perlin, Joe Phillips, Adam Pollina, George Pratt, Brian Pulido, Joe Quesada, Alan Rabinowitz, Ted Rall, Tom Raney, Ralph Reese, James Robinson, Adrienne Roy, John Rozum, Paul Ryan, Julius Schwartz, David Scroggy, Steven T. Seagle, Val Semeiks, Eric Shanower, Jim Shooter, Louise Simonson, Walter Simonson, Will Simpson, Ted Slampyak, Bob Smith, Frank Springer, Jim Starlin, Arne Starr, Alec Stevens, William Stout, Larry Stroman, Arthur Suydam, Art Thibert, Anthony Tollin, Kevin VanHook, Tom Veitch, Charles Vess, Matt Wagner, Lee Weeks, Alan Weiss, David Wenzel, Mark Wheatley, Bob Wiacek, Mike Wieringo, Kent Williams, Gahan Wilson, Barry Windsor-Smith, Marv Wolfman, John Workman, Berni Wrightson, and Mike Zeck	Called "New York Comic Book Spectacular"
March 13, 1994	Bloomington, Minnesota	Marriott Hotel		400 attendees
June 4–5, 1994	New York City	Jacob K. Javits Convention Center	Howard Chaykin, Walter Simonson, Jim Starlin	Dubbed "New York Comicon"
June 5, 1994	Chicago	Hyatt Regency Woodfield, Schaumburg, Illinois		
June 5, 1994	Pittsburgh	Sheraton at Station Square		
June 5, 1994	San Francisco	Holiday Inn Golden Gateway		
June 12, 1994	Miami	Crown Sterling Suites		
June 12, 1994	Minneapolis	Marriot Bloomington, Bloomington, Illinois		
June 12, 1994	St. Louis	Holiday Inn Linbergh Exit		
June 26, 1994	Boston	57 Park Plaza Hotel		
June 26, 1994	Denver	Holiday Inn, Denver		
October 21–23, 1994	Philadelphia	Pennsylvania Convention Center	Stan Lee	Called the "Philadelphia Comic Book Spectacular." 200 exhibitors; charity auction to benefit St. Jude's Hospital and Goodwill Industries. Hosts the 1994 Wizard Fan Awards.
January 22, 1995	Boston, Massachusetts	57 Park Plaza Hotel		c. 750 attendees
February 24–26, 1995	New York City	Jacob K. Javits Convention Center	Gene Simmons, Paul Stanley, and Hart D. Fisher	Called "The New York Comic Book Spectacular"
September 9–10, 1995	New York City	Jacob K. Javits Convention Center		Final comic convention at the Javits Center until the New York Comic Con in 2006
~~March 2–3, 1996~~	~~New York City~~	~~New York Coliseum~~	N.A.	Cancelled a few days beforehand; replaced at the last minute by the first Big Apple Comic Con.
