= Comics Code Authority =

Voluntary code to self-regulate the content of comic books in the United States

The Comics Code seal

The Comics Code Authority (CCA) was a self-regulatory organization formed in 1954 by the Comics Magazine Association of America that, at the height of its influence, served as a de facto censor for most of the U.S. comic book industry. The code was voluntary, as there was no law requiring its use, and it was designed to reassure advertisers, retailers, and parents about the content of comic books. The CMAA formed the Comics Code Authority at the height of a moral panic around comics that coincided with the United States Senate Subcommittee on Juvenile Delinquency hearings of 1954 and the publication of psychiatrist Fredric Wertham's book Seduction of the Innocent, both of which increasingly called for government regulation of comic books. Member organizations submitted comics to the CCA, which screened them for adherence to its code, then authorized the use of their seal on the cover if the book was found to be in compliance. Some publishers, mostly of children's comics (including Dell, Western, and Gilberton) never used the Code, but outside of children's comics, the lack of a CCA seal meant that distributors were unlikely to distribute a particular comic book. The power of the Code began to wane across the 1960s and 1970s, owing in part to changes in the distribution of comic books, the rise of underground comix, and the emergence of graphic novels and other adult comics. By 2010, only three major publishers still adhered to it: DC Comics, Archie Comics, and the now defunct Bongo Comics. Bongo broke with the CCA in 2010. DC and Archie followed in January 2011, rendering the code defunct.

== Background ==
The establishment of the Code followed years of significant backlash to the content of certain comic books as well as children's consumption of comics. The first widely-reprinted critique of comic books came from children's author Sterling North in 1940 when he declared that comics were "graphic insanity" in a column for the Chicago Daily News, which was later reprinted in the academic journal Childhood Education. After abating somewhat due to World War II, the anti-comics movement sprang back to life in 1948 due in part to the wider publication of Fredric Wertham's anti-comics critiques in magazines like Collier's and Saturday Review of Literature.

== Formation ==
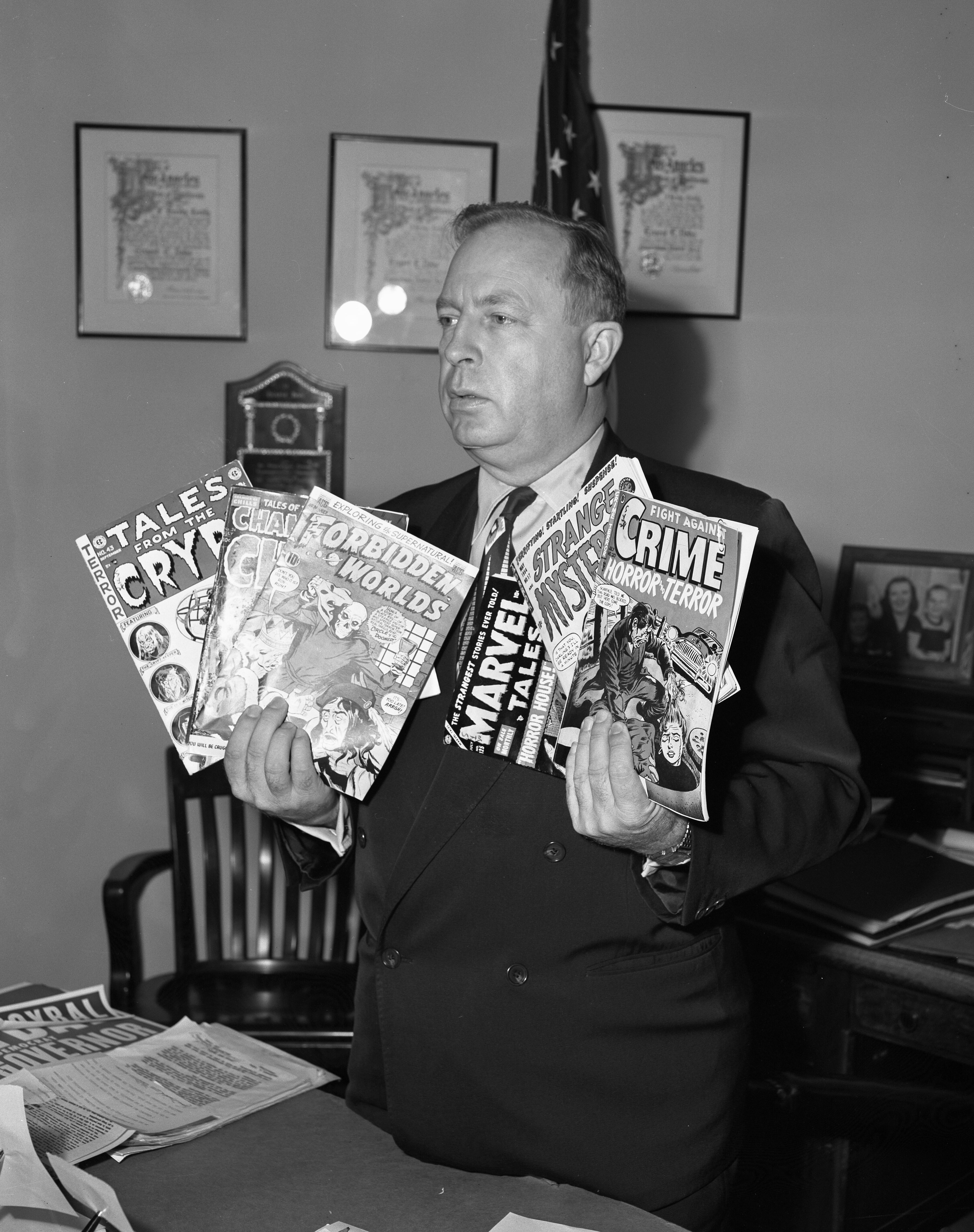
Los Angeles councilman Ernest Debs holding horror and crime comics purchased in his district (Los Angeles Daily News, 1954)

The Comics Magazine Association of America (CMAA) was formed in September 1954 in response to a widespread public concern over graphic violence and horror imagery in comic books. It named New York magistrate Charles F. Murphy (1920–1992), a specialist in juvenile delinquency, to head the organization and devise a self-policing "code of ethics and standards" for the industry. He established the Comics Code Authority (CCA), basing its code upon the largely unenforced code drafted by the Association of Comics Magazine Publishers in 1948, which in turn had been modeled loosely after the 1940 Hollywood Production Code, also known as the "Hays Code".

Before the CCA was adopted, some cities had already organized public burnings and bans on comic books. The city councils of Oklahoma City, Oklahoma, and Houston, Texas, passed ordinances banning crime and horror comics, although an attempt by Los Angeles County, California, was deemed unconstitutional by the courts. In his introduction to Archie Americana Series Best of the Fifties, editor Victor Gorelick reminisced about the code, writing, "My first assignment, as a new art assistant, was to remove cleavages and lift up low cut blouses on Katy Keene." He also wrote of Archie artist Harry Lucey that, "His sometimes suggestive storytelling–and he was one of the best–almost cost him his job. When his pencilled stories came in, the characters were dressed on one page only. The inker, a woman, Terry Szenics, later had to draw clothes on the characters on the remaining pages."

Although the CCA had no official control over the comics publishers, most distributors refused to carry comics that did not carry the seal. However, two major publishers of comics–Dell Comics and Gold Key Comics–did not display the seal, because their output was subject to a higher authority: their licensors, which included Walt Disney and the producers of many TV shows aimed at children.

=== Criticism and enforcement ===
Some publishers thrived under these restrictions, while others adapted by cancelling titles and focusing on code-approved content; still others went out of business. In practice, the negative effect of not having CCA approval was lack of distribution by the comic book wholesalers, who, as one historian observed, "served as the enforcement arm of the Comics Code Authority by agreeing to handle only those comics with the seal."

Publisher William Gaines believed that clauses forbidding the words "crime", "horror", and "terror" in comic book titles had been deliberately aimed at his own best-selling titles Crime SuspenStories, The Vault of Horror, and Tales from the Crypt.

Wertham dismissed the code as an inadequate half-measure. Comics analyst Scott McCloud, on the other hand, later commented that it was as if, in drawing up the code, "the list of requirements a film needs to receive a G rating was doubled, and there were no other acceptable ratings!"

=== "Judgment Day" ===
In one early confrontation between a comic-book publisher and the code authorities, EC Comics' William Gaines reprinted the story "Judgment Day", from the pre-code Weird Fantasy #18 (April 1953), in Incredible Science Fiction #33 (February 1956). The reprint was a replacement for the Code-rejected story "An Eye for an Eye", drawn by Angelo Torres, though "Judgment Day" was itself also objected to because of the central character being black, despite there being nothing in the Code prohibiting a black protagonist. The story, by writer Al Feldstein and artist Joe Orlando, was an allegory against racial prejudice, a point that was necessarily nullified if the lead character was not black. After an order by code administrator Charles Murphy to change the final panel, which depicted a black astronaut, Gaines engaged in a heated dispute with Murphy. He threatened to inform the press of Murphy's objection to the story if they did not give the issue the Code Seal, causing Murphy to reverse his initial decision and allow the story to run. Soon after, however, facing the severe restrictions placed upon his comics by the CCA, and with his "New Direction" titles floundering, Gaines quit publishing comic books to concentrate on Mad.

== 1954 Code criteria ==
The following shows the complete Code as it stood in 1954:

- Crimes shall never be presented in such a way as to create sympathy for the criminal, to promote distrust of the forces of law and justice, or to inspire others with a desire to imitate criminals.
- Scenes of excessive violence shall be prohibited. Scenes of brutal torture, excessive and unnecessary knife and gunplay, physical agony, the gory and gruesome crime shall be eliminated.
- Criminals shall not be presented so as to be rendered glamorous or to occupy a position which creates a desire for emulation.
- Policemen, judges, government officials, and respected institutions shall never be presented in such a way as to create disrespect for established authority.
- All scenes of horror, excessive bloodshed, gory or gruesome crimes, depravity, lust, sadism, masochism shall not be permitted.
- No comic magazine shall use the words "horror" or "terror" in its title.
- All lurid, unsavory, gruesome illustrations shall be eliminated.
- Inclusion of stories dealing with evil shall be used or shall be published only where the intent is to illustrate a moral issue and in no case shall evil be presented alluringly, nor so as to injure the sensibilities of the reader.
- In every instance good shall triumph over evil and the criminal punished for his misdeeds.
- If crime is depicted it shall be as a sordid and unpleasant activity.
- Scenes dealing with, or instruments associated with walking dead, torture, vampires and vampirism, ghouls, cannibalism, and werewolfism are prohibited.
- Profanity, obscenity, smut, vulgarity, or words or symbols which have acquired undesirable meanings are forbidden.
- Females shall be drawn realistically without exaggeration of any physical qualities.
- Suggestive and salacious illustration or suggestive posture is unacceptable.
- Nudity with meretricious purpose and salacious postures shall not be permitted in the advertising of any product; clothed figures shall never be presented in such a way as to be offensive or contrary to good taste or morals.
- Nudity in any form is prohibited, as is indecent or undue exposure.
- Illicit sex relations are neither to be hinted at nor portrayed. Rape scenes, as well as sexual abnormalities, are unacceptable.
- Sex perversion or any inference to same is strictly forbidden.
- Seduction and rape shall never be shown or suggested.

== 1960s–1970s ==
=== "Wolfman" and credits ===
Writer Marv Wolfman's name was briefly a point of contention between DC Comics and the CCA. In the supernatural-mystery anthology House of Secrets #83 (Jan. 1970), the book's host introduces the story "The Stuff that Dreams are Made of" as one told to him by "a wandering wolfman". The CCA rejected the story and flagged the "wolfman" reference as a violation. Fellow writer Gerry Conway explained to the CCA that the term referred to Marv Wolfman. The CCA agreed that it would not be a violation, as long as Wolfman received a writer's credit on the first page of the story; that led to DC beginning to credit creators in its supernatural-mystery anthologies.

=== Updating the Code ===
The Code was revised a number of times during 1971, initially on January 28, to allow for, among other things, the sometimes "sympathetic depiction of criminal behavior... [and] corruption among public officials" ("as long as it is portrayed as exceptional and the culprit is punished") as well as permitting some criminal activities to kill law-enforcement officers and the "suggestion but not portrayal of seduction." The clause "suggestive posture is unacceptable" was removed. Also newly allowed were "vampires, ghouls and werewolves... when handled in the classic tradition such as Frankenstein, Dracula, and other high calibre literary works written by Edgar Allan Poe, Saki, Conan Doyle and other respected authors whose works are read in schools around the world". Zombies, lacking the requisite "literary" background, remained taboo. To get around this restriction, Marvel in the mid-1970s called the apparently deceased, mind-controlled followers of various Haitian supervillains "zuvembies". This practice carried over to Marvel's superhero line: in The Avengers, when the reanimated superhero Wonder Man returns from the dead, he is referred to as a "zuvembie". DC comics published their own zombie story in Swamp Thing #16 (May 1975), where the deceased rise from their graves, while a soul-devouring demon appears in Swamp Thing #15 (April 1975).

Around this time, the United States Department of Health, Education and Welfare approached Marvel Comics editor-in-chief Stan Lee to do a story about drug abuse. Lee agreed and wrote a three-part Spider-Man story, portraying drug use as dangerous and unglamorous. While the Code did not specifically forbid depictions of drugs, a general clause prohibited "All elements or techniques not specifically mentioned herein, but which are contrary to the spirit and intent of the code, and are considered violations of good taste or decency". The CCA had approved at least one previous story involving drugs, the premiere of Deadman in Strange Adventures #205 (Oct. 1967), which clearly depicted the title character fighting opium smugglers (as well as the name "Deadman" being classed as a violation that was eventually allowed). However, Code administrator Leonard Darvin "was ill" at the time of the Spider-Man story, and acting administrator John L. Goldwater (publisher of Archie Comics) refused to grant Code approval because of the depiction of narcotics being used, regardless of the context, whereas the Deadman story had depicted only a wholesale business transaction.

Confident that the original government request would give him credibility, and with the approval of his publisher Martin Goodman, Lee ran the story in The Amazing Spider-Man #96–98 (May–July 1971), without CCA approval. The storyline was well received, and the CCA's argument for denying approval was deemed counterproductive. "That was the only big issue that we had" with the Code, Lee recalled in a 1998 interview:

I could understand them; they were like lawyers, people who take things literally and technically. The Code mentioned that you mustn't mention drugs and, according to their rules, they were right. So I didn't even get mad at them then. I said, 'Screw it' and just took the Code seal off for those three issues. Then we went back to the Code again. I never thought about the Code when I was writing a story, because basically I never wanted to do anything that was to my mind too violent or too sexy. I was aware that young people were reading these books, and had there not been a Code, I don't think that I would have done the stories any differently.

Lee and Marvel drew criticism from DC head Carmine Infantino "for defying the code", stating that DC will not "do any drug stories unless the code is changed". As a result of publicity surrounding the Department of Health, Education and Welfare's sanctioning of the storyline, however, the CCA revised the Code to permit the depiction of "narcotics or drug addiction" if presented "as a vicious habit". DC itself then broached the topic in the Code-approved Green Lantern/Green Arrow #85 (Sept. 1971), with writer Dennis O'Neil and artist Neal Adams beginning a story arc involving Green Arrow's teen sidekick Speedy as a heroin addict. A cover line read, "DC attacks youth's greatest problem... Drugs!"

== 1980s–1990s ==
Throughout the 80s and 90s, there was a break away from the Comics Code Authority. In 1984, the Comics Code Authority denied Swamp Thing issue #29 the seal of approval; however, DC decided to continue publishing the title without the approval. Some subsequent DC series, including Watchmen and The Dark Knight Returns (1986), launched without ever receiving the CCA Seal of approval. For example, the adult content-geared 1993 DC Vertigo imprint did not launch with CCA approval.

A late adopter of the code was Now Comics, which began displaying the Code seal on titles released in early 1989.

== Abandonment and legacy ==
The CCA rejected an issue of the Marvel Comics series X-Force, requiring changes to be made in 2001. Instead, Marvel stopped submitting its comics to the CCA and subsequently established its own rating system.

Bongo Comics discontinued using the Code without any announcements regarding its abandonment in 2010.

The CMAA, at some point in the 2000s, was managed by the trade-organization management firm the Kellen Company, which ceased its involvement in 2009. In 2010, some publishers, including Archie, placed the seal on their comics without submitting them to the CMAA. Archie Comics President Mike Pellerito said that the code did not affect his company the way that it did others as "we aren't about to start stuffing bodies into refrigerators." DC Comics announced on January 20, 2011, that it would discontinue participation, adopting a rating system similar to Marvel's. The company noted that it submitted comics for approval through December 2010, but would not say to whom they were submitted. A day later, Archie Comics, the only other publisher still participating in the Code, announced it also was discontinuing it, rendering the Code defunct.

The vast majority of advertisers had ceased making decisions on the basis of the CCA stamp over the past few years, according to a January 24, 2011, Newsarama report. Most new publishers to emerge during this time did not join the CCA, regardless of whether their content conformed to its standards. The Comic Book Legal Defense Fund announced that it would acquire the intellectual property rights to the Comics Code seal from the defunct CMAA on September 29, 2011.

The Comics Code seal can be seen among the production logos in the opening shots of the 2018 superhero film Spider-Man: Into the Spider-Verse, and its 2023 sequel, Spider-Man: Across the Spider-Verse. Binge Books announced that it had used the seal on the one-shot comic Heroes Union, produced by Roger Stern, Ron Frenz, and Sal Buscema in May 2021.

== See also ==
- Children's comics
- Censorship in the United States
- Children and Young Persons (Harmful Publications) Act 1955
- LGBT themes in comics
- Motion Picture Production Code
- Tokyo Metropolitan Ordinance Regarding the Healthy Development of Youths
- Electronic Software Rating Association

== Bibliography ==
- Dean, M. (2001) Marvel drops Comics Code, changes book distributor. The Comics Journal #234, p. 19.
- Gilbert, James. A Cycle of Outrage: America’s Reaction to the Juvenile Delinquent in the 1950s. New York: Oxford University Press, 1986.
- Hajdu, David. The Ten-Cent Plague: The Great Comic-Book Scare and How it Changed America. New York: Farrar, Straus and Giroux, 2008.
- Lent, John, ed. Pulp Demons: International Dimensions of the Postwar Anti-Comics Campaign. Madison, NJ: Fairleigh Dickinson Press, 1999.
- Nyberg, Amy Kiste. Seal of Approval: History of the Comics Code. Jackson: University Press of Mississippi, 1998.
- Original Comics Code
- 1971 Revision
- 1989 Revision
