= Child's Play (comics) =

1994 Marvel Comics storyline

- Cover of X-Force vol. 1, 32 (Mar, 1994). Art by Tony Daniel.
- Publisher: Marvel Comics
- Publication date: March – April 1994
- Genre: Superhero; Crossover
- Title(s): X-Force #32-33; The New Warriors #45-46
- Main character(s): New Warriors; X-Force; Upstarts

Creative team
- Writer: Fabian Nicieza
- Penciller(s): X-Force; Tony Daniel; The New Warriors; Darick Robertson
- Inker(s): X-Force; Jon Holdredge; The New Warriors; Larry Mahlstedt
- Letterer(s): X-Force; Chris Eliopoulos; The New Warriors; Anthony Avon
- Colorist(s): X-Force; Marie Javins; The New Warriors; Ovi Hondru
- Editor(s): X-Force; Tom DeFalco; Bob Harras; Lisa Patrick; The New Warriors; Rob Tokar

"Child's Play" is a 1994 Marvel Comics crossover storyline featuring the New Warriors, X-Force, and the Upstarts. It is also the first time Karma reunites with the New Mutants since she left the team in New Mutants #54 (1987).

== Plot ==
The Upstarts continue their series of games to prove their power and worth to one another. This time, they devise the Younghunt, a mission to capture all of the surviving members of the New Mutants (some of whom are now members of X-Force) and the Hellions. This competition also brings the Upstarts into conflict with the New Warriors, as Firestar is a former Hellion. The Upstarts acquire most of their targets, who are pitted against X-Force and the New Warriors during the crossover's climax. Paige Guthrie, who secretly followed X-Force on the rescue mission, convinces the Gamesmaster to play another game—instead of killing mutants, the Upstarts should compete with the mutant leaders of the world to find and train young mutants like herself. The Gamesmaster is intrigued by the proposition and cancels the competition.

Danielle Moonstar, still affiliated with the Mutant Liberation Front, unmasks herself to her former teammates and reveals that she was not an imposter. Moonstar maintains her cover and does not reveal she is working for S.H.I.E.L.D. to her teammates at this juncture, but this marks the first hint that she does not buy into the MLF's agenda. Meanwhile, Magma divorces herself from the Amara Aquilla persona and decides to uncover her origins as Alison Crestmere.

== Tie-in issues ==
- X-Force #32 (Move 1)
- The New Warriors #45 (Move 2)
- X-Force #33 (Move 3)
- The New Warriors #46 (Move 4)
