= Black Canaan =

- Short story by Robert E. Howard
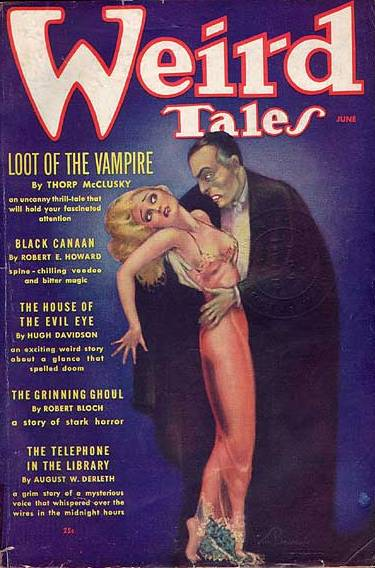
- Country: United States
- Language: English
- Genres: Horror, Southern Gothic

Publication
- Published in: Weird Tales
- Publication type: Pulp magazine
- Publication date: June 1936

"Black Canaan" is a short story by American writer Robert E. Howard, originally published in the June 1936 issue of Weird Tales. It is a regional horror story in the Southern Gothic mode, one of several such tales by Howard set in the piney woods of the ArkLaTex region of the Southern United States. The related stories include "The Shadow of the Beast", "Black Hound of Death", "Moon of Zimbabwe", and "Pigeons from Hell".

== Plot summary ==
While in New Orleans, Kirby Buckner is confronted by an elderly Creole woman who whispers a bizarre warning: "Trouble on Tularoosa Creek!" The woman quickly disappears into a nearby crowd. Buckner immediately realizes that his backwoods homeland is in peril and instantly departs for the Canaan region of his birth. He arrives after midnight and heads out on horseback through the bayou, before reaching the town of Grimesville. En route, he encounters a mysterious "quadroon girl" who mocks him. Buckner is disturbed to find himself aroused by her provocative beauty. The woman calls forth several large black men from hiding to kill Buckner, but he shoots one and kills another with a thrown bowie knife. As the third flees, he notices that the girl has vanished.

Buckner joins his fellow white men, but finds himself strangely reluctant to speak about the black woman. He learns how the local blacks are now being led by a strange "conjure man" named Saul Stark, who has vowed to kill all the whites in Grimesville and set up a black empire in America. Most are apprehensive concerning the imminent "uprising". The scion of an important family, Buckner is looked to for leadership during this time of crisis.

The men of Grimesville had already captured a frightened black man, Tope Sorely, and were about to interrogate him when Buckner arrived. One of the men offers a whip for use as coercion but Buckner, against beating the truth from Tope, attempts to calm him instead. Tope is afraid of Stark's wrath should he betray his own master. He fears that Stark will use his magical powers to "put me in de swamp!" Promises of protection persuade Tope to tell them of Stark's ambitions. However, Buckner decides to confront Stark himself. Traveling to Stark's cabin, Buckner finds Stark has left, but instinctively realizes that he placed some sort of supernatural entity within the cabin to guard it and does not enter. As he returns to his fellow townspeople, Buckner once again meets the quadroon girl. "I have made a charm you cannot resist!" she gloats, and deep down Kirby knows this is true. The woman tells him about how, on this very night, she will summon Kirby to her and they'll witness the Dance of the Skull, where he'll be left powerless to resist.

The witch woman melts mysteriously into the swamp and Buckner rides away. Along the trail, Buckner meets Jim Braxton, a friend who has come searching for him. Buckner admonishes Braxton about returning to Grimesville, so he can find and face Stark alone. However, Braxton refuses to allow his friend to face this danger on his own. As the sun sets, Buckner feels himself drawn towards the black settlement of Goshen, unable to resist or even speak of the witch's spell to Braxton. He attempts to warn his friend away several times, but to no avail. Arriving at Goshen, both men encounter the witch woman. Buckner is paralyzed by the spell, but Braxton acts out and shoots at her. Once more she vanishes, and they find no body. Suddenly, they're attacked by something in the swamp, which they cannot see clearly, and Jim Braxton is killed. Buckner, totally helpless in the grip of a voodoo spell, finds himself watching the rites of Damballah from a grove of trees. The orgiastic rites will climax with Buckner meeting a hideous fate at the hands of Saul Stark. Just then, amid a circle of Stark's followers, the witch appears, her body swaying rhythmically in the Dance of the Skull. Buckner realizes that she is the source of Stark's power, and, at the end of the ceremony, Stark will fully consolidate his power over the black people of the region.

However, as the witch finishes her dance she collapses, dead, for Braxton's bullet had struck home, hitting her in the heart. Only her supernatural power had kept her alive this long. As she expires, Buckner feels the spell laid upon him lift. The black people flee in panic, their uprising haulted, as Buckner stalks out of the swamp and kills Stark. Afterwards, Buckner learns the meaning of Tope Sorley's cryptic words: "He'd put me in de swamp!" He discovers that Stark magically altered the appearance of his enemies, transforming them into mindless amphibian horrors. The burden of this terrible knowledge is a secret Buckner does not share with his fellow whites, creating an unspoken bond between himself and the black people of Canaan.

== Background: Kelly the Conjure-man ==
"Black Canaan" was inspired by the legend of Kelly the Conjure-man. In late 1930, Howard wrote a long letter to H. P. Lovecraft concerning the history and lore of the South and Southwest. He mentions the Scotch-Irish settlement of Holly Springs, Arkansas, where his grandfather, William Benjamin Howard, settled in 1858. After recounting some of the local history, Howard goes on to write:

Probably the most picturesque figure in the Holly Springs country was Kelly the 'conjer man', who held sway among the black population of the `70s. Son of a Congo ju-ju man was Kelly, and he dwelt apart from his race in silent majesty on the river... He lifted 'conjers' and healed disease by incantation and nameless things made of herbs and ground snake bones... Later he began to branch into darker practices... [T]he black population came to fear him as they did not fear the Devil, and Kelly assumed more and more a brooding, satanic aspect of dark majesty and sinister power; when he began casting his brooding eyes on white folks as if their souls, too, were his to dandle in the hollow of his hand, he sealed his doom...They began to fear the conjure man and one night he vanished...

— Robert E. Howard, Letter to H. P. Lovecraft

In Howard's following letter to Lovecraft, he responds to the latter's suggestion that he make use of Kelly in his fiction; "Kelly the conjure-man was quite a character, but I fear I could not do justice to such a theme as you describe." However, despite Howard's reticence, Kelly did begin to find a way into his writing.

In the letter in which he first mentions Kelly, Howard thanks Lovecraft for putting him in touch with William B. Talman. Talman was an employee of Texaco, and wrote to Howard concerning contributions to his company periodical, The Texaco Star. Howard's article "The Ghost of Camp Colorado" appeared in The Texaco Star a few months later in April 1931.

It was also in 1931 that Howard submitted a follow-up article to The Texaco Star entitled "Kelly the Conjure-Man". The article begins with:

About seventy-five miles north-east of the great Smackover oil field of Arkansas lies a densely wooded country of pinelands and rivers, rich in folklore and tradition. Here, in the early 1850s came a sturdy race of Scotch-Irish pioneers pushing back the frontier and hewing homes in the tangled wilderness.
Among the many picturesque characters of those early days, one figure stands out, sharply, yet dimly limned against a background of dark legendry and horrific fable -- the sinister figure of Kelly, the black conjurer.

— Robert E. Howard, Kelly the Conjure-Man

From there, Howard expands on the story of Kelly as recounted to Lovecraft.

"Kelly the Conjure-Man" was rejected by The Texaco Star and only saw publication decades after Howard's death. However, a seed had been planted in Howard's imagination to germinate for several years. Eventually, Howard recast Kelly as Saul Stark in "Black Canaan".

== Reception ==
In his obituary of Howard, H. P. Lovecraft singled it out for praise; "Other powerful fantasies lay outside the connected series -- these including...a few distinctive tales with a modern setting, such as the recent 'Black Canaan' with its genuine regional background and its clutchingly compelling picture of the horror that stalks through the moss-hung, shadow-cursed, serpent-ridden swamps of the American far South."

=== Controversy ===
"Nigger" is used throughout the story frequently. (The narrator Kirby Buckner describes the use of the term by others, and uses it himself when conversing with peers, but uses "black" or "negro" when addressing the reader directly.)

== Comics adaption ==
The story was adapted by writer Roy Thomas and penciler Howard Chaykin into a Conan story, as was other non-Conan material previously handled in Marvel Comics' and novel editions. The story was presented in two issues, Conan the Barbarian #82-83 (cover-dated Jan.-Feb. 1978), under the titles The Sorceress of the Swamp and The Dance of the Skull!.
