= Pigeons from Hell =

- Short story by Robert E. Howard, adapted by Joe R. Lansdale
- 1979 Ace Books collection cover art by Esteban Maroto
- Country: United States
- Language: English
- Genres: Horror, Southern Gothic

Publication
- Published in: Weird Tales
- Publication type: Pulp magazine
- Publication date: May 1938

"Pigeons from Hell" is a Southern Gothic horror story by American writer Robert E. Howard, written in late 1934 and published posthumously by Weird Tales in 1938. It has been reprinted dozens of times, often in "Best Of" and "Hall of Fame" anthologies, and translated into several languages.

Two men traveling through the American South spend the night in a haunted house and encounter a grisly reality of voodoo and zombies. The title comes from an image of the ghost stories told by Howard's grandmother, especially one about a deserted plantation mansion haunted by pigeons. The one-line introduction, by Weird Tales editor Farnsworth Wright, read: "A fearsome story of frightful death, a whistle in the dark, and three women whose bodies hung in that dreadful room of horrors — by a late great master of weird fiction."

"Pigeons from Hell" was nominated for the 2014 Retrospective Hugo Award for Best Novelette, losing to science fiction author Clifford D. Simak's "Rule 18".

== Plot summary ==
"Pigeons from Hell" is a horror novelette of three chapters, separately titled "The Whistler in the Dark", "The Snake's Brother", and "The Call of Zuvembie".

Two New Englanders, Griswell and his friend John Branner, travel across the South and spend the night in a deserted plantation manor. Griswell awakens from a dream about a yellow-faced creature looking down at him from the upstairs landing. He then sees Branner walk up the stairs in a trance. He is horrified when Branner returns as an animated corpse, gripping the bloody axe that had split his skull. Griswell flees into the woods.

In his flight, he meets the county's sheriff, Buckner, who investigates the house and finds Branner motionless on the floor, with the axe embedded where Griswell was sleeping. Griswell is implicated in his friend's murder, but the sheriff gives him the benefit of a doubt and tries to clear his name. Buckner gives some credence towards Griswell's bizarre tale due to the manor's ominous reputation. It was formerly the Blassenvilles' residence, a family from the West Indies who were known for their cruelty.

After the American Civil War, the Blassenvilles fell into poverty, with all their male members dead and only four sisters remaining, shortly to be joined by their Aunt Celia from the West Indies and her mulatta maid Joan. Celia mistreated Joan, and when the latter disappeared, it was thought she had run away. Soon after, Celia vanished as well, and it was thought that she had returned to the West Indies. Over the next months, three of the Blassenville sisters also vanished one by one. One night in 1890, the last of the Blassenvilles, Elizabeth, fled the house, claiming she had found her sisters' corpses inside a secret room and was attacked by something in the shape of a woman with a yellow face. Afterwards, Elizabeth left for California and never returned. The manor has lain deserted since, and the local black folk shun it. The eponymous pigeons sometimes flock about the decaying manor. Legend has it that they are the souls of past Blassenvilles' members.

The following evening, Buckner and Griswell visit the hut of an ancient voodoo practitioner, Jacob, seeking information about the house and the Blassenvilles. Jacob tells of the extinct family and of Celia Blassenville, who mistreated her maid Joan. He claims to be a creator of "zuvembies", although he insists he cannot talk about them to a white man without Damballah sending a snake with a white crescent moon on its head to kill him. Still, he drifts into senility before rambling about voodoo, the god Damballah, and zombies along with their female counterparts, zuvembies: who live only to kill, have no sense of time, possess hypnotic powers, and can live indefinitely unless wounded by either "steel or lead". Finally, he tells how "she" participated in voodoo rites and that "the other" came to Jacob for the "Black Brew", which transforms a woman into a zuvembie. Reaching for some firewood, Jacob is bitten by a venomous snake, meeting the fate he feared. Buckner and Griswell conclude that Joan transformed herself into a zuvembie, so she could exact her vengeance on Celia Blassenville and her nieces. They resolve on spending the night in Blassenville Manor to learn the truth. There, they find Elizabeth Blassenville's diary, which tells of her fear that something is in the house with her, has killed her sisters, and will kill her too.

That night, while lying awake in complete darkness, Griswell hears the same whistling as the previous night, which Elizabeth's diary had also mentioned. Thinking he is fleeing the house, Griswell finds himself climbing the manor stairs against his own will. He is confronted by a female apparition with a yellow face and welding a knife. Griswell is powerless to resist, but Bruckner, who has followed him up the stairs, shoots the creature, which flees, mortally wounded. They track its dying noises into the secret room, where they discover the hanging bodies of the three missing Blassenville sisters as well as the corpse of the zuvembie, which is still dressed in a ball gown.

Suddenly, Bruckner recognizes the face of the zuvembie from a portrait he has seen. It's none other than Celia Blassenville. The maid Joan, in revenge, gave the Black Brew she received from Jacob to her mistress and fled. Celia Blassenville, transformed into a zuvembie, killed three of her nieces and had been living in the abandoned manor, killing anyone who entered it at night.

Bruckner says that the case can be closed by saying that a madwoman had killed Griswell's friend John Branner, since nobody will believe the truth of the matter.

== Illustrations ==
The original single illustration was by Virgil Finlay; unusually, Weird Tales reprinted the story in November, 1951, with a different illustrator, Lee Brown Coye. Later illustrators for its interior and cover art include Boris Vallejo, Jeffrey Catherine Jones, Esteban Maroto, and Scott Hampton.

== Comments ==
In 2018, a news item from the Bleeding Cool website reported that Howard's estate had applied to register a trademark for comic book versions of "Pigeons From Hell." Rich Johnston explained that there had been debate over the filing of the copyright; but "trademark is different to copyright, and while it may be argued the content of the story is public domain, the trademark for the title and selling under that name, would be different. And it is that, that Robert E. Howard Properties is applying for a trademark for, but only for comic books. Dark Horse Comics published an adaptation under license from the estate, and now Marvel Comics has the Conan licence. I wonder if there's a spinoff being planned?"

"Pigeons from Hell" is one of several regional horror stories by Howard set in the Piney Woods of the ArkLaTex region of the Deep South. Other stories include "The Shadow of the Beast", "Moon of Zimbabwe", "Black Hound of Death", and "Black Canaan".

== Reception ==
In 1983, Stephen King, writing in Danse Macabre, calls "Pigeons from Hell" to be "one of the finest horror stories of our century". Horror historian R. S. Hadji includes "Pigeons from Hell" on his list of the most frightening horror stories.

== Adaptations ==
The story is the basis for an eponymous episode of Boris Karloff's Thriller television series, airing in June 1961. It was directed by John Newland, with a teleplay by John Kneubuhl, and starred Brandon De Wilde, Crahan Denton, Ken Renard, and Ottola Nesmith as the Blassenville Zuvembie. It was adapted again in televised form for Suspense, a revival of the 1940s-1950s television anthology series, in an episode that aired January 30, 2015.

In 1988, the story was adapted into a graphic novel by Scott Hampton for Eclipse (ISBN 0913035688), as a stand-alone paperback, with a limited edition hardcover. Horror novelist Ramsey Campbell wrote the introduction to this version. Ryan Harvey wrote for Black Gate: Adventures in Fantasy Literature, "Hampton's trip to visit Howard's southern horrors is one of the most faithful, if not the most faithful, adaptations of [Howard] in any medium. It has the same brisk and breathless pacing, the same 1930s Gothic southern atmosphere, and the same level of palsied fear. Hampton's artwork is a seamless meld with Howard's style: robust and realistic, shot through with shadows. The graphic novel has little in common in its look and 'silent' style with most contemporary comic works — either from the 1980s or now — and leaps right off the page because of it. Howard fans who haven't read it should see if they can dig up a full-color copy."

The story was re-envisioned and modernized by comedy horror author Joe R. Lansdale, with art by Nathan Fox, as a four-issue comic book mini-series and published in four issues by Dark Horse Comics, starting in April 2008. In early 2009, Dark Horse re-released it in trade paperback form, with an afterword by fantasy author Mark Finn and bonus artwork pages from guest illustrators. Ryan Harvey describes the re-write at length, discussing how Lansdale "replaces the two New England strangers who stop at the Blassenville Manor while on a road trip with a new group of characters who come across as [a] Goth rock version of the Scooby Doo gang." Harvey calls it a fun adaptation which, however, "proves that all the expansion and updating in the world can't fix what wasn't broken [...] The Lansdale/Fox Pigeons from Hell is a swampy and gory good time, feeling much closer to a modern 'backwoods brutality' horror flick than Howard's grim campfire folk story" with "the finale as a standard 'Let's go back and get that thing' action-centered conclusion. [...] Fox's artwork (his first solo comics gig) is ugly in the positive sense: everything is bent, twisted, and unclean."

Another graphic edition appeared in 2008 as a 60-page comic in the omnibus The Mammoth Book of Zombie Comics, with text appearing only in speech balloons, to mixed reviews.

The Pretenders' song "Back on the Chain Gang" references this story in the lyric "... the news of the world / Got in the house like a pigeon from Hell."
