= Zuvembie =

Fictional zombie

A zuvembie is a creature used by Robert E. Howard in his short story "Pigeons from Hell," published in Weird Tales in 1938. In the 1970s Marvel Comics used the term in place of "zombie", which had been banned by the Comics Code Authority.

== Pulp magazines ==
Robert E. Howard used the "zuvembie" in his short story "Pigeons from Hell", published in Weird Tales in 1938.

In the story, a woman can become a zuvembie by drinking the Black Brew. The resulting creature is no longer human, knowing no friend or relative. It cannot talk, or think like a human. It doesn't need to eat and will live forever, staying in a cave or an old house. It has certain powers—it can command owls, bats, snakes, pigeons, and werewolves. It can hypnotise the living with its voice, and command the body of someone it has killed until the body is cold. It can only be killed by either lead or iron.

== Television ==
When "Pigeons from Hell" was adapted into an episode of the television anthology series Thriller, the "zuvembie" was adapted with it, played by Ottola Nesmith.

== Comics ==
Under the Comics Code Authority, comic books in late twentieth century United States operated under many restrictions, mostly aimed at preventing horror elements from being used. This code became more lenient in 1971 but still prevented the use of certain terms such as "zombie", because they lacked the literary background of creatures such as vampires and werewolves, although not the use of zombies or zombie-like creatures. In order to circumvent this, Marvel Comics used the term "zuvembie" in place of "zombie" in their comics.

In 1989 the Code was changed again, permitting the word "zombie", and Marvel retired the term "zuvembie". In 1997, John Byrne used the word again briefly in Wonder Woman Annual #6, published by DC Comics. In 2007 Deadpool, a character known for breaking the fourth wall, uses the term alongside Zombie in Cable & Deadpool #48. These uses suggest that, since its first appearance in Weird Tales, "zuvembie" has become a term acknowledged by both major comic book companies, DC Comics and Marvel Comics, and that it is now seen as an esoteric reference to comic book cultural history.

== Music ==
Zuvembies is also the name of an underground, odd time signature funk band based in New York City.
