= Attic Books =

Book store

- Type: Private
- Industry: Books
- Founded: London, Ontario (1976)
- Headquarters: 240 Dundas Street; London, Ontario; N6A 1H3
- Key people: Marvin Post, owner
- Products: Antiquarian and used books
- Website: Official website

Attic Books is one of Canada's largest independent used bookstores in London, Ontario, Canada. It specializes in antiquarian books, maps, prints, and ephemera.

== History ==
Marvin Post opened Attic Books in 1976. It was located on the top floor of 428 Richmond Street, London and moved to the second floor of 388 Clarence Street in 1977. Development in downtown London forced Attic Books to relocate to Parkhill, Ontario in 1987. In 1996, mayor Diane Haskett encouraged Post to bring Attic Books back to London. It is now one of the few longstanding destination businesses in the city's downtown core.

In 2006, Attic Books' second floor, previously only available to dealers and known collectors, was opened to the public and is stocked with specialized antiquarian books, maps, prints, collectibles, antiques and books on books.

== Marvin Post ==
Marvin Post, owner of Attic Books, has been a member of the International League of Antiquarian Booksellers (ILAB) and the Antiquarian Booksellers Association of Canada (ABAC) since 1981. He is also a member of the Canadian Booksellers Association (CBA). He "appraises a variety of archives, books and related material for a number of public institutions for insurance and tax purposes".

Post was a stamp dealer in 1969. He owned a record store in the early 1970s called B-side Records, which used the label from an antiquarian book press for its symbol, a triad of bumblebees.

He is a regular attendee at the Ottawa Book Fair, the Toronto Antiquarian Book Fair and the Toronto Paper Show.

== Other information ==
Attic Books is one of the very few places where Charles van Sandwyk's fine art and fantasy cards and books can be purchased.

Involved in the community, Attic Books often sponsors and hosts awards and events in London, Ontario.

It is also the only local supplier of Brodart mylar jackets.

Attic Books also participates in trade shows in Toronto and Ottawa.

== History of the building ==
The building at 240 Dundas Street is late Victorian red brick commercial in style. Originally, the building was a single floor and only about 20' long. It was not expanded until the 1880s, when the second and third floor were added. The second floor was attached to 242 Dundas Street, creating a large space that accommodated Somerset Hall. Doorways on the main floor also allowed access to the adjacent building. A hoist existed where the current elevator can be found.

During a major renovation in 1909, arts and crafts elements were added to the façade. The back end of the store was extended and a mezzanine was added to the third floor. This renovation was designed and executed by famous London architect J. M. Moore. Before 1909, the building matched the three structures that surround it, two to the west and one to the east. The elevator was installed in 1909, and was made by the Roelofsen Machine and Tool Co. in Galt, Ontario.

The large pane glass windows overlooking the street were installed by McPhillips & Co. in the 1930s. The outer two window panes on each of the upper picture windows pivoted to open like doors. These windows facilitated the movement of pianos from the street to the upper floors for display. They have since been replaced with more energy efficient windows

Marvin Post purchased the building from the Thompson family, owners of Supertest, in 1996. The Thompsons had owned it since the early 1930s. When repainting the elevator, Post removed 35 lbs. of lead paint from the car, unveiling a rainbow of colours that had been added over the years. The alternating dark and light wood on the second level flooring is called a "wedding floor", made of walnut and maple, and can also be found in 242 Dundas next door. When Post took possession of the building in 1996, the toilets had not been updated, although the plumbing had been. The toilet tanks were still made of wood, and have since been replaced.

The gargoyle overlooking Dundas Street was added by the current owner. It was designed by Florin Musta, and acquired through Tony O'Callaghan of Studio Celtia, former business at 242 Dundas Street.

== Other businesses at 240 Dundas St. ==
1875 – Abraham Spry, merchant tailor

1876 – 1880 – Various small businesses

1880 – Vacant

1881 – 1886 – Reid Brothers & Co., stationers

1887 – 1892 – Empire Tea Company (Main Floor)

Somerset Hall (Second Floor – London Temperance League)

1892 – 1907 – Anderson & Nelles Drug Store (Main Floor)

Somerset Hall (Second Floor – London Temperance League)

1892 – First electricity

1893 – First telephone

1907 – 1919 – People's Outfitting Company, furniture

1919 – 1927 – Thomas Furniture Company, furniture

1927 – Gray's Music, subsidiary of Eaton's

1930 – 1965 – McPhillips Company, pianos, radios, appliances

1965 – 1995 – Robert Holmes Stationery, stationery and books

1996 – present – Attic Books, rare and fine used books

== The ghost of Attic Books ==
In 2009, the Paranormal Knights of London performed an investigation at 240 Dundas Street into the possible presence of a ghost. Activities that have been attributed to the ghost include books flying, lights flickering, and the strong odor of a cigar wafting up from the basement stock room near the original foundations. The staff affectionately calls him Roland.
