= Paul Castiglia =

American film producer

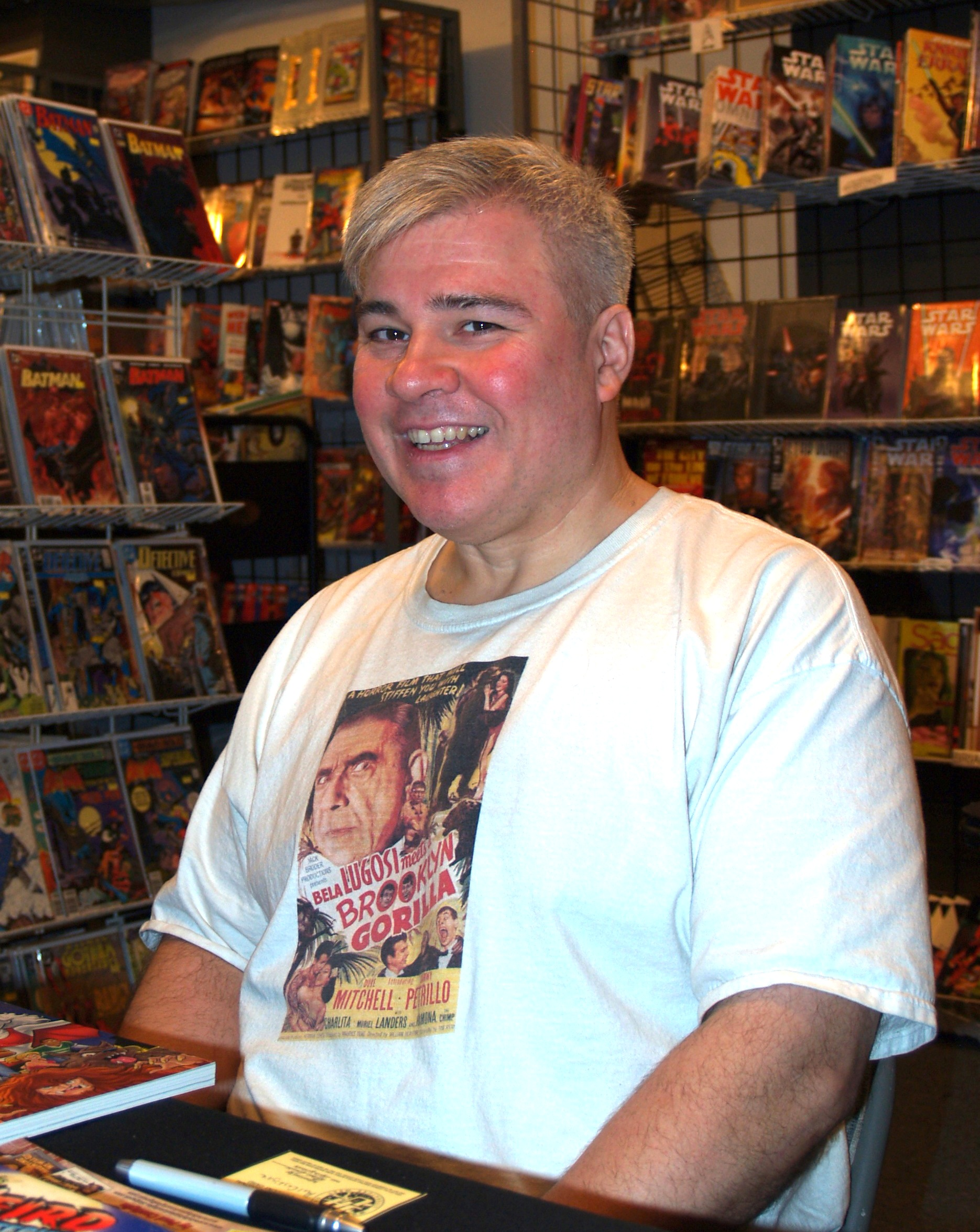
- Occupations: Editor, writer, film producer

Paul Castiglia is an American comic book writer and editor known for his work for Archie Comics, including his work on Sonic the Hedgehog, Archie's Weird Mysteries and his editing work on the Archie Americana Series. He has also written non-fiction text articles for magazines and books on pop culture, has recorded music under the name Paul Cast, is a documentary film producer, and is the co-writer of two animated series, Thomas & Friends Adventures for Mattel Toys, and Cocoa Talk for Minno.

== Early life ==
Castiglia was born February 7, 1966, in Passaic, New Jersey.

== Career ==
Paul Castiglia has been editor and writer on comic books including Archie, Teenage Mutant Ninja Turtles Adventures and Sonic The Hedgehog. He wrote or co-wrote all 34 issues of Archie's Weird Mysteries/Archie's Mysteries and wrote stories for several issues of The New Little Archie Comics Digest Magazine.

Castiglia had an editorial hand (billed variously as "Americana Series Editor", "Assistant Editor", and "Compilation Editor") in all 12 volumes of the Archie Americana Series including the final volume Best of the Nineties Book 2 which was released in 2011.

In September 2014 it was announced that Castiglia would be one of the leading editors and researchers on a new series of vintage reprint collections from Archie Comics called Archie's Favorites which began with the first volume, Archie's Favorite Christmas Comics in October 2014.

=== Comic books ===
- Lead writer on Archie's Weird Mysteries comic book series
- Contributing writer to Archie, Teenage Mutant Ninja Turtles Adventures and Sonic the Hedgehog
- Contributing writer to Looney Tunes Magazine and the DC Comics series Showcase.
- Writer of Tex Avery Comics for Dark Horse
- Co-creator and writer of Conservation Corps
- Writer of Sophistikats appearing in Wild Life from Antarctic Press
- Writer for Cracked Magazine
- Guest-Writer for War of the Independents from Red Anvil Press
- Guest-Writer for KING! from Blacklist Studios

As recounted in his introduction to The Love Showdown Collection ("A Funny Thing Happened on the Way to San Diego"), Castiglia conceived the idea of a storyline that would have Archie choose between Betty and Veronica "once and for all" as well as the denouement of the story in which Castiglia suggested the company revive Cheryl Blossom as the "wild card" character that Archie actually ends up with at story's end. The story, which ran in 1994 across four different Archie published comic book titles, was called the Love Showdown (Archie Comics). Castiglia promoted the storyline to mass media news outlets resulting in worldwide coverage. This made the "Love Showdown" the most notable and talked-about Archie Comics story of the 1990s. The company would not achieve the same level of publicity again until 14 years later with the Archie Marries Veronica/Archie Marries Betty storyline created by Michael Uslan.

=== Film and television projects ===
Castiglia is an Executive Producer, Writer, Creative Consultant, Casting Producer and Music Supervisor on an upcoming documentary Bowery Rhapsody: the Rise and Redemption of Hollywood's Original Brat Pack. According to the film's imdb page, the documentary from Handshake Away Productions takes a look at the key actors comprising The Dead End Kids, The Little Tough Guys, The East Side Kids and The Bowery Boys movie acting teams.

Castiglia is the co-writer of the animated web series, Thomas & Friends Adventures which Mattel Toys which launched on YouTube in early 2017. The series takes the familiar Thomas train engine characters and puts them into fantastical stories where anything can happen.

In 2023, Castiglia co-wrote episodes of the streaming video series, Cocoa Talk for Minno.

=== Books ===
Castiglia has written non-fiction text articles for magazines and books on pop culture, including a chapter in Midnight Marquee Actors Studios: Vincent Price. He has announced an upcoming book, Scared Silly: Classic Hollywood Horror-Comedies.

In 2013, Castiglia contributed pieces to two comics-related books. For With Great Power Castiglia was one of several who wrote tales about the same copy of Amazing Fantasy#15 (the comic book that featured Spider-Man's first appearance) being passed along from owner-to-owner. For Hey Kids, Comics! Castiglia wrote an essay about growing up discovering, collecting and reading comic books.

In 2014, Castiglia wrote an introduction for a volume of Felix the Cat Paintings by Don Oriolo from IDW Publishing.

Castiglia has co-written and co-edited the MLJ Comics Companion book from TwoMorrows Publishing. The book explores the history of Archie Comics' superhero characters. It was released in the fall of 2016.

=== Musical projects ===
Under the stage name of "Paul Cast" Castiglia is a published songwriter registered with BMI, with four songs published by Scott Lea Productions: "Comic Book Heart of Mine", "Cuttin' Loose", "How Does Your Heart Feel?" and "The FriendFish Theme." "Cuttin' Loose" was released as a 12-inch single by Scamp Records. "How Does Your Heart Feel?" appeared on What Exit?, a compilation of New Jersey recording artists. "The FriendFish Theme" was written for an unproduced animated series.

=== Charitable projects ===
Castiglia has been a co-captain of the Kids Comic Con (KCC) initiative since 2008. The initiative is an outreach to children encouraging and engaging their imaginations through the reading and creating of comic books and other creative endeavors. The KCC initiative has teamed with Ronald McDonald House New York for several special events and benefits.

Since 2009, Castiglia has been active in charity work as the "Creator Coordinator" for Superheroes For Hospice, a charity that puts on comic book shows and mini comic conventions with the proceeds going toward the St. Barnabas Hospice in Livingston, New Jersey.

Castiglia provided editorial guidance to Shira Frimer for her graphic novel Nistar which tells the story of a superhero for children with cancer. Frimer distributed the book for free to children's hospitals across the United States.

In October 2014 (National Bullying Prevention Month), Castiglia was announced as a contributing writer to a graphic novel anthology called Rise: Comics Against Bullying which was released by Northwest Press in March 2015.
