= Mike Diana =

American underground cartoonist

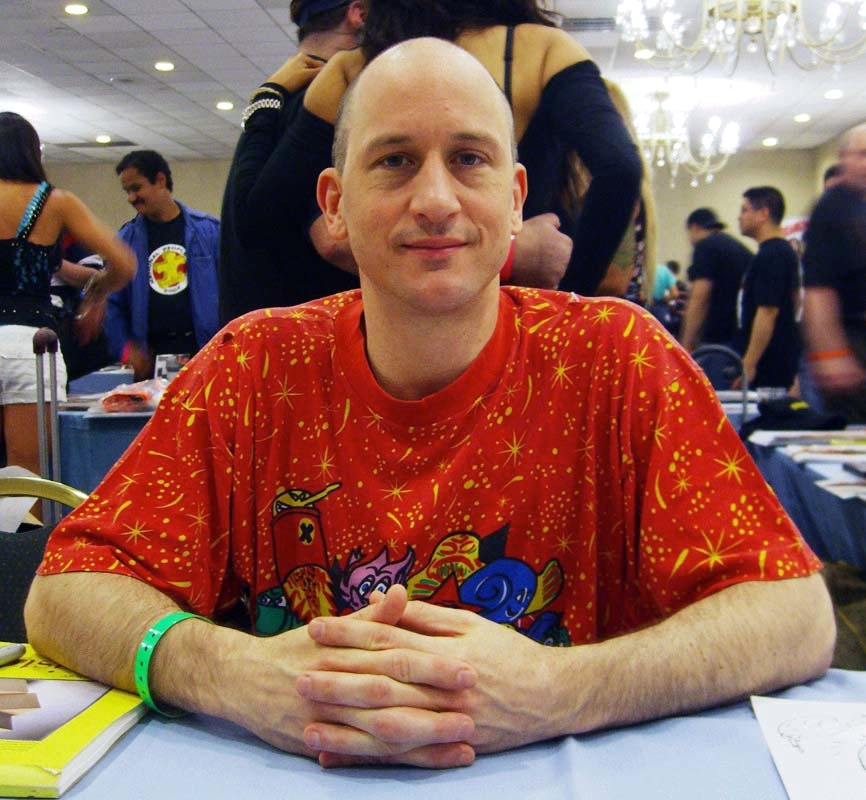
- Diana at the Big Apple Summer Sizzler in Manhattan, June 2009
- Born: Michael Christopher Diana; 1969 (age 56–57) New York City, U.S.
- Areas: Cartoonist, Inker
- Notable works: Boiled Angel

Michael Christopher Diana (born 1969) is an American underground cartoonist. His work is largely self-published and deals with themes including sexuality, violence, and religion. He is the first person to receive a criminal conviction in the United States for artistic obscenity for his comic Boiled Angel.

During his childhood and teen years, Diana took an interest in creating art others found disturbing. Living in Florida as an adult, he began publishing his comics in zines, which he primarily distributed through the mail. His work came to the attention of the FBI during their investigation of serial killings in another Florida city, and they forwarded it to Diana's local police after ruling him out as a suspect. In 1992, after he sent copies of his work to an undercover police officer, Diana was charged under Florida law with obscenity. The jury found him guilty, and his sentence included supervised probation, during which any art or writings he produced were subject to unannounced, warrantless searches and seizure by the police. Two of the three counts of obscenity were upheld on appeal, and an appeal to the U.S. Supreme Court was denied. Meanwhile, Diana moved to New York, which declined to extradite him to Florida, and he completed his probation there.

== Early life ==
Mike Diana was born in 1969 in New York City. He, his younger sister, and younger brother Matt were baptized Catholic. His mother placed him in an after school art program where, for one assignment, his class was to collect seashells on the beach and incorporate them into a collage made with plaster of Paris. Diana instead incorporated the garbage and a dead fish he had found, referring to the beach pollution that was the topic of contemporary news stories. Diana later related this story during his obscenity trial to illustrate his point of view that "art can be ugly and convey a message."

In 1979, when nine-year-old Diana was in the middle of fourth grade, he and his family moved from Geneva, New York to Largo, Florida. Though Diana received barely passing or failing grades, he received As in art classes.

== Amateur publishing career ==
Diana began drawing comics in high school, influenced by macabre subject matter such as Topps Ugly stickers, Wacky Packages and Creature Feature cards. Publications that he drew inspiration from included Heavy Metal, Creepy, Eerie, Basil Wolverton's Plop!, Bernie Wrightson's run on Swamp Thing, and the work of Jack Davis. He also enjoyed underground comics from creators such as S. Clay Wilson, Greg Irons, Rory Hayes, and Jack Chick's religious tracts, which he describes as "sick". He also enjoyed visiting the Salvador Dalí Museum in St. Petersburg.

Though Diana enjoyed the stained glass windows in the church he attended every Sunday as a child, seeing Jesus hanging on the cross disturbed him. He eventually came to so loathe the donating of money into collection baskets following sermons that spoke of burning in Hell, his Sunday bible study class, and the denouncing of popular music among his fellow congregants that he stopped going to church by age 16. The animus he developed toward the Roman Catholic Church, along with the Jack Chick tracts, influenced Diana's depiction of anti-religious themes in his work. The conservative Florida atmosphere against which Diana chafed also influenced the graphic nature of his imagery.

In 1987, during his senior year of high school his aversion to class inspired him to draw his own comics depicting unpopular teachers being graphically killed. He distributed them to his friends and submitted them to horror magazines, but was met with rejection. Diana, who lived with his father, would stay up late at night and into the morning working on his comics following working shifts at his father's convenience store in Largo. The content of his work was often characterized by nudity, violence, caricature of the human form and scatological themes, which he says he produces in order to "open people's eyes" by shocking them.

In 1988 Diana and his friend Robert, who was also born in New York State, bonded over their mutual dislike of the Florida climate, and after Robert got a job at a print shop, he convinced his boss to let them print at cost 960 copies of a zine on which they collaborated called HVUYIM, provided that they did the labor. Later that year Diana created another zine called Angelfuck, which was named after a song from the Misfits album Static Age, of which he published three issues. He then decided to do a digest size magazine, which he called Boiled Angel, which also depicted such horrors as cannibalism, torture, rape, and murder. The first issue had a print run of 65 signed and numbered copies, and by the time he printed issue #2, demand by readers, who were mostly people in other states and those who had read write-ups in review publications like Factsheet Five, increased its print run to 300.

In 1988 nineteen-year-old Diana was working as an elementary school janitor in Largo, where he would use the school's copy machine to print out the magazine. The publication, which depicted subjects such as child rape and sodomy, bestiality, human mutilation, and drug use, was distributed to about 300 subscribers. Diana was fired by the school after some of the material that he had left there was discovered.

== Legal troubles ==
=== Investigation ===
In 1991, a California law enforcement officer came into possession of one of the comics, parts of which reminded him of the then-unsolved Gainesville student murders in Florida. Copies of the books were also found in the possession of a suspect in that case, which brought the publication to the attention of the Federal Bureau of Investigation (FBI). Later that year, a few days before Christmas and after Diana had sent out a few copies of the just-published Boiled Angel #6, FBI agents showed up at Diana's mother's house, which Diana was known to visit. They showed him a copy of that issue, told him that he was a suspect in the Gainesville case, and requested a blood sample for DNA analysis. The test results ruled out Diana as a suspect, so the FBI forwarded their information on Diana and his work to the Pinellas County Sheriff's Office in Florida.

Later, after Diana had printed Boiled Angel #7 and 8 (the final issue of that series) and a new graphic novel called Sourball Prodigy, he received a total of ten letters from a police officer named Michael Flores. Flores was posing as a fellow artist who had just moved to Largo from Fort Lauderdale and requested copies of Diana's books. Flores insisted in his letters that he was not a policeman, and despite declining to meet Diana in person, Diana obliged him with copies of his comics. In 1992 the Assistant State's Attorney, Stuart Baggish, later came across the books and sent Diana a certified letter that said he was being charged with obscenity, pursuant to Florida Statute § 847.011(1): once for publishing the material, once for distributing it, and once for advertising it.

=== Trial ===
Diana contacted the non-profit First Amendment organization the Comic Book Legal Defense Fund (CBLDF), which provided him with a lawyer, Luke Lirot, and paid Diana's legal fees, which would later total $10,000. Lirot argued that Flores' letters constituted entrapment, but failed to get the case summarily dismissed, or to get the case moved to Tampa, where he and Diana felt they would get a more sympathetic jury. They went to trial the following year, in March 1994, in Pinellas County Court.

Baggish argued that Diana's work was obscene in a way that an easily available teen horror movie was not, because the latter "portrays violence in a gross way, but it does not portray sex in a patently offensive way", which is one of the criteria for obscenity under the 1973 U.S. Supreme Court Miller v. California ruling, the other two being an appeal to the "average" prurient interest in sex, and the lack of any artistic, literary, political, or scientific value. According to Lirot, the jury was visibly disgusted by the examples of Boiled Angel that they were made to read. According to Diana, the jurors were asked "what their idea of art was, and one of them said 'needlepoint'." Baggish also called as a witness Tampa psychologist Sidney Merin, who stated that people "of questionable personality strengths" could be aroused by the comic book. The prosecution also made a point of informing the jury that Diana had been a suspect in the Gainesville murders, despite the fact that the real killer, Danny Rolling, had been caught and pleaded guilty before the trial started, and Baggish told the jurors that if Diana weren't stopped he might become a mass murderer or turn others into killers, as Diana's comics were clearly aimed at such people. Baggish drew parallels with the Rolling case, stating, "This is how Danny Rolling got started. Step one, you start with the drawings. Step two, you go on to the pictures. Step three is the movies. And step number four, you're into reality. You're creating these scenes in reality." Baggish would later argue after the trial that serial killer Ted Bundy had blamed pornography for his crimes.

Diana testified for over three hours to explain his art to the jury, though the judge denied his request to enter into evidence a stack of his old underground comics, with which Diana wished to illustrate that he was not doing anything unprecedented. In his summary, Baggish told the jurors, "Pinellas County has its own identity. It doesn't have to accept what is acceptable in the bathhouses in San Francisco, and it doesn't have to accept what is acceptable in the crack alleys of New York." On March 29, 1994, after a week-long trial, the jury found him guilty after deliberating for 90 minutes, making Diana the first artist to be convicted of obscenity in the United States.

According to Robyn Blumner, executive director of the American Civil Liberties Union (ACLU) of Florida, the comics' political and anti-establishment themes, which included its depiction of pedophile priests, crosses smeared with feces, and a drawing of two eggs frying atop a Bible with the caption "This is your brain on religion" should have protected Diana from an obscenity conviction under the First Amendment, but instead inflamed the jury toward a conviction. Pointing to the prosecution's allusions to serial murder, Diana opined that he was railroaded. Diana further likened Largo to a "police state", saying that the police had the fire department evict his family from their house with only one week's notice, and bulldozed it.

=== Sentencing ===
Judge Walter Fullerton ordered Diana held in jail for four days until sentencing without bail, which drew criticism from publications such as St. Petersburg Times and Mother Jones magazine, with the latter's Sean Henry stating that while this was the norm for murderers and drug lords, it is not so for those convicted of misdemeanors. Fullerton explained, "I felt incarceration in jail was part of the sentence, so why not begin? He learned some good lessons." Though Baggish recommended Diana be incarcerated for two years, Fullerton sentenced Diana to three years of supervised probation, a $3,000 fine ($1,000 for each count), 1,248 hours of community service, and ordered him to avoid contact with minors. Fullerton also ordered Diana to follow a state-supervised psychiatric evaluation at his own expense, to take an ethics-in-journalism class, and ruled that he was to submit to unannounced, warrantless searches of his personal papers by the police and deputized probation officers from the Salvation Army, which would allow them to seize any drawings or writings. Although such random searches during probation are typical only in drug and weapons cases, Baggish stated that it was natural to extend this for obscenity convictions, saying, "Treatment is the most important part of the sentence", and that such searches were needed to force Diana "to refrain in a rehabilitative vein from this conduct. To cure the psychological maladjustment, [it's necessary] to catch him in his true state."

Aspects of this sentence drew critical reaction from the civil liberties activists. ACLU's Blumner was surprised by these provisions, saying, "I don't know of any time when such monitoring has been used on an artist. It reminds you of mind control. The fact that the state doesn't like Michael Diana's attitude and will send him to experts and conduct searches is like legalized lobotomy." Susan Alston Executive Director of the CBLDF at the time, in Northampton, Massachusetts argued, "There have been about half-a-dozen comic book obscenity cases in the United States, but most involved store owners selling perceived obscenity—and as a result no artist was ever ordered to stop drawing. Michael Diana is the first known American artist who's been legally banned from drawing as part of his sentence." Richard Wilson, a national officer of the First Amendment Lawyers Association, called the sentence "absolutely illegal", saying that it amounted to unconstitutional prior restraint. Noted comics creators also were outraged. Comics writer and novelist Neil Gaiman spoke out in support of Diana, and writer and theorist Scott McCloud called the inspection and seizure of Diana's personal drawings "sheer lunacy". Writer Peter David characterized the sentence as "onerous".

=== Probation, appeals and other legal troubles ===
Despite his and others' reaction to the sentence and Diana's bitterness toward those who targeted him, he says his probation officer, who followed his trial, was generally sympathetic and wished only to help him through his probation. During that time, Diana took up painting, and he produced one for Wired magazine that depicted himself as a tiny figure in the courtroom and the judge and prosecutors as monsters surrounding him, which he jokingly suggested violated his probation.

Following his sentencing, Diana consulted with a psychiatrist who told him she charged $100 an hour for his exam, which she said would take three hours. Upon conclusion of the exam, which involved an interview, an examination of his work, true/false questions, and a Rorschach test, she charged him $1,300, informing him that she had spent 10 hours reviewing his comics. Diana, who suspected her of inflating her bill because she knew the court had ordered him to pay for the exams, refused, and was never given the test results.

According to the November/December 1994 Mother Jones magazine, Diana had been recently arrested in Orlando when he tried to pay for a horse-and-carriage ride with a $1 bill doctored to look like a $20 bill. His attorney stated that Diana was unaware of the forgery and charges were dropped when Diana agreed to a pretrial probation program.

Two appeals to the State Appellate Court failed to have the case reversed or reheard in Florida. During the first appeal process, the prosecution used evidence gathered after the original trial, a move that, according to the CBLDF, is usually considered unethical. On May 31, 1996, Douglas Baird upheld Diana's conviction on two of the counts, affirming the original ruling that Diana's work was "patently offensive" and that if Diana's intent was to show "that horrible things are happening in our society, [he] should have created a vehicle to send his message that was not obscene." The only count of the three that was judged incorrect was the one for advertising obscene material, because the advertisement in question was the "Be on the lookout for the next issue #8!" blurb that ran in issue #7, and the Court agreed that it was improper to convict someone for advertising material that had not yet been created since Diana could not, at the time, know the nature or character of the work.

In 1996, while his case was still on appeal in Florida, Diana moved to New York City, where he was granted permission to serve out his sentence, and fulfill his community service obligation through volunteer work for the Comic Book Legal Defense Fund. Soon after the move, the Court refused to accept an amicus brief submitted by the ACLU, and responded without comment to the second appeal. Because Diana was no longer in their jurisdiction and New York City refused to extradite him because his convictions were for misdemeanors, they allowed him to serve his probation by mail, and took the required journalistic ethics course at New York University. Diana found another psychiatrist who charged him only $100 and concluded that he was perfectly normal, which she reported to the Florida court. He performed his community service by working about ten hours per week at a Lower East Side community garden and another six hours per week at God's Love We Deliver, a group that delivers food to HIV patients. Before his probation officer quit the Salvation Army-run probation department, she told the court that Diana had violated his probation. Still owing $2,000 in fines, a warrant was issued for his arrest in Florida.

In May 1997 the CBLDF and the ACLU submitted a petition for a writ of certiorari to the United States Supreme Court to hear Diana's case, with First Amendment attorney George Rehdart assisting in the petition. On June 27, the Court denied the petition without comment, effectively ending his legal options in his battle to overturn his conviction.

In February 2020, 26 years after his sentence, Diana was removed from probation.

== Post-legal trouble work ==
Mike Diana was published and represented by Shane Bugbee and Michael Hunt Publishing. Angry Drunk Graphics now publishes his work.

In a 2011 interview, he indicated that he planned to release a box set of Boiled Angel #1–8. He also indicated a desire one day to produce a graphic novel about the court case and how his life in Florida influenced the rebellious nature of his art. He also continues to enjoy painting. He has collaborated with Carlo Quispe on Uranus Comix.

In 2017 Superchief Gallery in Los Angeles hosted an exhibition of his multimedia work, in addition to several Boiled Angel reprints.

In 2025 Spazio Nadir in Vicenza, Italy, hosted an exhibition of his drawings taken from Boiled Angel curated by Nicola Stradiotto.

== Personal life ==
As of 1994, Diana was engaged to Suzy Smith, who once produced a local cable show. They both posed nude for an underground magazine.

Diana has indicated that he usually does not vote, the one exception being the 1992 U.S. presidential election, in which he voted for Ross Perot in the hopes of preventing a victory by Bill Clinton. Regarding the 2000 Presidential election, Diana says that had he voted, he would have voted for Ralph Nader.

== Cultural references ==
Mike Diana's legal troubles inspired Busted Jesus Comix, a 2005 off-Broadway play written by David Johnston and directed by Gary Shrader. The play borrows many particulars from the legal case and punishments meted out to Mike Diana, while the character of the comic artist in Busted Jesus and the background story are entirely fictional. The play was produced on Off-Off-Broadway and in Los Angeles, and received favorable reviews.

Diana's prosecution was referenced in the graphic novel Teenagers from Mars by Rick Spears and Rob G.

Boiled Angels: The Trial of Mike Diana, a documentary detailing Diana's legal battle and its ripples within the comic artists' community, was successfully crowdfunded by artist Anthony Sneed and directed by Frank Henenlotter. It was released in 2018.

== Bibliography ==
=== Books ===
- Hvuyim issue #1, zine with Robert Rootes, 1988, published by Red Stew Comix
- Festering Brainsore issue #2, 1988, published by David R. Williams
- Slaughterhouse Comix issue #1, 1988, published by Red Stew Comix
- Angelfuck issues #1-3, 1989, published by Red Stew Comix
- Boiled Angel zine issues #1–8, 1989–1991, published by Red Stew Comix, 1992 reprint of 7 & 8 by Michael Hunt Publishing
- Sourball Prodigy, issue #1-2, 1992, published as book in 2002 by Portuguese publisher MMMNNNRRRG
- Superfly comic book issue #1, 1993, published by Michael Hunt Publishing
- Cherry Bomb Revolution, 1995, published by Michael Hunt Publishing
- Worst of Boiled Angel, 1996, published by Michael Hunt Publishing
- Superfly comic book issue #2, 1997, published by Michael Hunt Publishing (delayed until 2001)
- Mobile Instrumentation Van, silkscreen fold-out, 1997
- Unholy Art, 1997
- War Sex, 2000, published by Le Dernier Cri
- Go to Hell, 2003, published by Le Dernier Cri
- Scummy Comix comic book, 2007, published by Angry Drunk Graphics
- Goo of the Gods, 2010, published by Smittekilde
- AMERICA, two volume retrospective: LIVE & DIE, 2014, published by Divus
- Needler, 2014
- Firebrat, hardcover with new and old work, 2015, published by CrnaHronika
- Upsidedown Cross, in the style of a Chick tract, 2015, included with limited edition of movie of the same name directed by William Hellfire

=== As a contributor ===
- ANSWER Me! #3 and #4
- Zero Zero
- CriCa Ilustrada mag published by Chili Com Carne (Portugal)
- Nervi published by In Your Face Comix (Italy)
- Angry Drunk Graphics' Holiday Spectacular #2 published by AngryDrunkGraphics
- Kekrapules published by Atoz Edition (Switzerland), Mille Putois (Canada) and Z Production (Switzerland), 1993.
- TESTicle PRESSure #1-#4 published by Propulsion Productions
- Zine Soup: A Collection of International Zines and Self-Published Art Books (2009) TTC Gallery.
- Comic Book Artist (Vol 2) #6

=== Films ===
- Baked Baby Jesus, directed by Mike Diana, 1990
- Blue Banshee, directed by Mike Kuchar, 1994
- Ecstasy in Entropy, directed by Nick Zedd, 2000
