= Boiled Angel =

Independent comic book

Publication information
- Publisher: Mike Diana
- Format: Ongoing series
- Genre: Humor/comedy

Creative team
- Written by: Mike Diana, Paul Weinman, et al.
- Artist(s): Mike Diana, Scott Cunningham, et al.

Boiled Angel was an early 1990s independent comic book created by Florida-based underground comic book artist Mike Diana. The comic contained graphic depictions of a variety of taboo and gory subject matters. It effectively became the first comic book in the United States to cause its creator to be convicted for artistic obscenity. Eight issues of the comic were self-published on an irregular schedule from 1989 to 1991, with reprints of issues 7 and 8 in 1992 and a “worst of” collection issued 1996.

In a 1990 review, Mike Gunderloy of Factsheet Five called Boiled Angel "a prime candidate for banning in the 90s." In 1993, a copy of Boiled Angel #8 (or "Ate") found its way into the hands of Florida Assistant State's Attorney Stuart Baggish after the comic was found in the possession of a suspect in the “Gainesville ripper” murders. Danny Rolling was later arrested and convicted for the killings.

Diana was subsequently charged with several counts of obscenity and fought a long legal battle with the aid of the Comic Book Legal Defense Fund. He was ultimately convicted on two of three charges, and lost all appeals. He was sentenced to community service and three years of supervised probation.

== Cultural references ==
The comic was referenced in the Venetian Snares song "Boiled Angel", which sampled his drunk friend talking about the comic.
