= Vincent Giarrano =

American painter and comic artist

- Born: Vincent Giarrano; November 17, 1960 (age 66) Buffalo, New York, U.S.
- Areas: Penciller, Inker
- Pseudonym: Vince Giarrano

Vincent Giarrano (born November 17, 1960), also known as Vince Giarrano, is an American contemporary realist painter and former comic book artist.

== Education ==
Vincent Giarrano was born on November 17, 1960 in Buffalo, New York. He took an early interest in drawing and by the time he was 12, decided to pursue a career as an artist.

He went on to complete his Bachelor of Fine Arts from the University at Buffalo in 1982 and a Master of Fine Arts from Syracuse University in 1985. Subsequently, he worked as an illustrator for Marvel Comics and DC Comics, among others. Giarrano credits his years of experience drawing comic books with developing a sense of the narrative structure.

== Work ==
Around 2000, Giarrano again started to take an active interest in fine arts, particularly in realist painting. He meticulously studied the works of John Singer Sargent, attended workshops and painted with friends. From the middle of the decade his works started to appear in Group and Solo Exhibitions fairly frequently. His works have been exhibited in the National Portrait Gallery, Smithsonian Institution, Washington, D.C., and National Portrait Gallery, London.

Giarrano often paints the ubiquitous experiences from everyday lives, believing these fleeting moments can carry something of infinite significance. He also puts a lot of importance on effectively capturing light and creating a moody atmosphere.

== Influence ==
Besides John Singer Sargent, other painters like Joaquín Sorolla, Anders Zorn and Edward Hopper have influenced Giarrano. He is also inspired by the courage and commitment of Dutch Post-Impressionist painter Vincent van Gogh.
