= Archie Americana Series =

Series of comic book trade paperbacks (1990s–2011)

The Archie Americana Series is a series of comic book trade paperbacks, published by Archie Comics from 1991 to 2011. The series attempts to present a history of Archie comics, with each book featuring significant stories from a specific decade, and featuring introductions by famous writers and celebrities. The series initially covered the entire span between the 1940s and the 1990s with stories showcasing some of the more significant stories from those decades. Archie Comics has printed "book 2" for those decades.

== Books ==
Cover to Archie Americana Best of the Forties

- Archie Americana Series: Best of the Forties (1991)
- Archie Americana Series: Best of the Fifties (1992)
- Archie Americana Series: Best of the Sixties (1995)
- Archie Americana Series: Best of the Seventies (1998)
- Archie Americana Series: Best of the Eighties (2001)
- Archie Americana Series: Best of the Forties Book 2 (2002)
- Archie Americana Series: Best of the Fifties Book 2 (2003)
- Archie Americana Series: Best of the Nineties (2008)
- Archie Americana Series: Best of the Sixties Book 2 (2008)
- Archie Americana Series: Best of the Seventies Book 2 (2010)
- Archie Americana Series: Best of the Eighties Book 2 (2010)
- Archie Americana Series: Best of the Nineties Book 2 (2011)
