= David Scroggy =

American retailer, columnist and editor

- Born: December 19, 1951 (age 74) Akron, Ohio, U.S.
- Areas: Retailer, Columnist, Editor, Executive
- Notable works: VP, Product Development, Dark Horse Comics
- Awards: Inkpot Award, 1977

David Scroggy (born December 19, 1951 in Akron, Ohio) is an American retailer, columnist, editor, and executive in the field of comic books. From 1993 to 2017, he was head of new product development at Dark Horse Comics.

Scroggy attended Harvey S. Firestone High School in Akron; classmates included Chrissie Hynde (later of the Pretenders) and future comics professionals Paul Mavrides and Craig Yoe.

Scroggy started out in the comics business in 1975. Having moved from Ohio to San Diego, Scroggy was hired by Shel Dorf, organizer of San Diego Comic-Con, to work as a volunteer at the convention. With Dorf's encouragement and assistance, Scroggy began writing a column for Alan Light's trade publication The Buyer's Guide to Comics Fandom (later known as the Comics Buyer's Guide). This in turn got him in the door at the local San Diego retailer Pacific Comics. Before long, Scroggy had risen to general manager of Pacific Comics' four San Diego shops (his official title was Wholesale Distribution Manager). For his work in the industry, Scroggy was given an Inkpot Award at San Diego Comic-Con in 1977.

Later, when Pacific Comics expanded into publishing, Scroggy helped recruit the reclusive Steve Ditko to publish with Pacific. In 1981 Scroggy was named Editorial Director of the comics division; he also edited Jack Kirby's Captain Victory and the Galactic Rangers and the Pacific anthology Vanguard Illustrated during that period. As Pacific Comics began to publish limited-edition art portfolios by comic book and fantasy artists, under the Schanes & Schanes imprint, Scroggy was involved editorially. One example was The Portfolio of Underground Art, published in 1980. The portfolio consisted of thirteen oversize signed and numbered plates; one each by a notable underground comix artist, created for the project. Scroggy selected the artists and wrote both biographies and a text booklet that accompanies the plates. Contributor included Rick Griffin, Robert Crumb, S. Clay Wilson, Robert Williams, Spain Rodriguez, Greg Irons, and others. Scroggy edited and wrote text for The Bladerunner Sketchbook (1982), published by Pacific Comics under their Blue Dolphin imprint. Vanguard Illustrated was an anthology comic book that teamed a new, unpublished talent with an established one. A new writer's story would be illustrated by an established artist, and vice versa. Writers whose first professional work appeared in Vanguard include Fabian Nicieza, Joey Cavalieri, and David Campiti. Artists included Brendan McCarthy and Geof Darrow.

Scroggy left Pacific in 1984 to become organizer of the annual San Diego Comic Book Expo, the trade show associated with San Diego Comic-Con. During this same period, roughly from 1983 to 1992, Scroggy worked as an agent for creators in the comics industry. He was an editor at Dark Horse Comics in 1989, and started Dark Horse's Product Development department in 1993. Scroggy again wrote a column in Comics Buyer's Guide in the 1990s.

Scroggy was Vice President of Product Development at Dark Horse for many years, retiring in 2017.

In 2019, Scroggy was a reference source for Derf Backderf in the 2020 graphic novel Kent State: Four Dead in Ohio, sharing his eyewitness account of the Kent State shootings over the weekend of May 2–3, 1970.
