= Rick Leonardi =

American comics artist (born 1957)

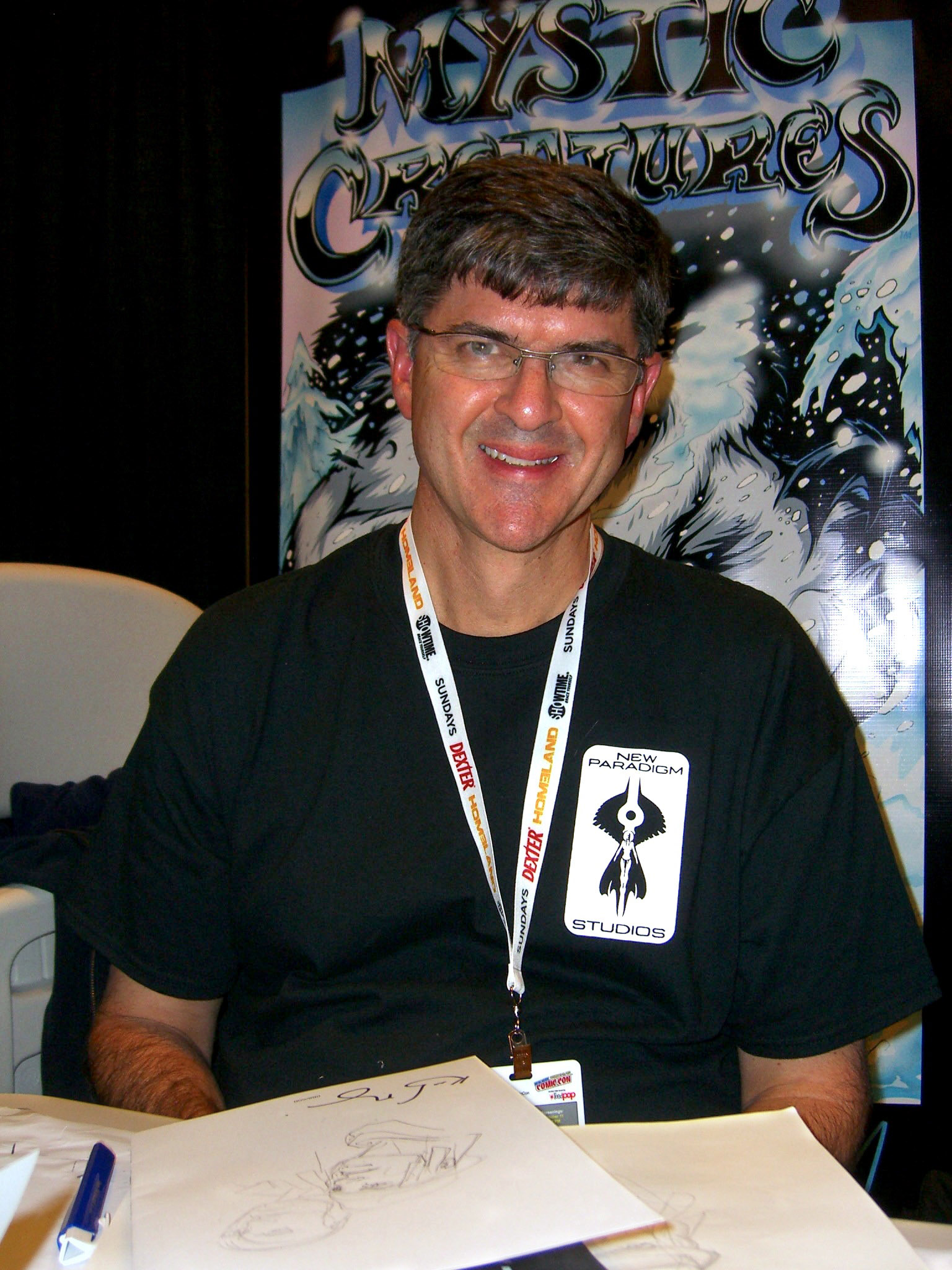
- Leonardi at the 2012 New York Comic Con
- Born: August 9, 1957 (age 69) Philadelphia, U.S.
- Area: Artist
- Notable works: Spider-Man 2099; Batman Beyond; Cloak and Dagger; Green Lantern Versus Aliens; New Mutants; Star Wars: General Grievous; Uncanny X-Men; The Vision and the Scarlet Witch

Rick Leonardi (born August 9, 1957) is an American comics artist who has worked on various series for Marvel Comics and DC Comics, including Cloak and Dagger, The Uncanny X-Men, The New Mutants, Spider-Man 2099, Nightwing, Batgirl, Green Lantern Versus Aliens and Superman. He has worked on feature film tie-in comics such as Star Wars: General Grievous and Superman Returns Prequel #3.

== Early life ==
Rick Leonardi was born August 9, 1957 in Philadelphia, and grew up in Haverhill, Massachusetts.

Leonardi's interest in becoming an artist was inspired by the work of Joe Kubert, which he discovered in the second grade when he read Star Spangled War Stories #139 (July 1968). Leonardi commented in a 2017 interview, "Top of page 8 is still one of the best-designed panels I've ever seen."

Leonardi graduated from Dartmouth College in 1979, and started drawing for Marvel Comics the following year.

== Career ==
Leonardi first interviewed with Marvel in January 1980. His first published comics artwork appeared in Marvel's Thor #303 (Jan. 1981). He collaborated with writer Bill Mantlo on two limited series: The Vision and the Scarlet Witch (Nov. 1982–Feb. 1983) and Cloak and Dagger (Oct. 1983–Jan. 1984). Leonardi's works in the 1980s include various fill-in issues of The Uncanny X-Men and The New Mutants.

He is credited, along with fellow illustrator Mike Zeck, of designing the black-and-white costume to which Spider-Man switched during the 1984 Secret Wars miniseries, and later wore for a time. According to writer Peter David, the costume began as a design by Zeck that Leonardi embellished. The plot that developed as a result of Spider-Man's acquisition of the costume led to the creation of the Spider-Man Venom although in a 2007 Comic Book Resources story, fan Randy Schueller claims to have devised a version of a black costume for Spider-Man in a story idea that he was paid for. Leonardi and writer Tom DeFalco created the Rose in The Amazing Spider-Man #253 (June 1984). For DC Comics, Leonardi was one of the artists on Batman #400 (Oct. 1986) and he drew the Batgirl story in Secret Origins vol. 2 #20 (Nov. 1987). Back at Marvel, Chris Claremont and Leonardi introduced the fictional country of Genosha in Uncanny X-Men #235 (Oct. 1988). From 1992 to 1994, Leonardi was the regular penciler for the first 25 issues of Spider-Man 2099 with writer Peter David. Leonardi later launched the Fantastic Four 2099 series with Karl Kesel. Leonardi drew the 2000 intercompany crossover miniseries Green Lantern Versus Aliens. He drew one of the tie-in one-shots for the Sentry limited series in 2001.

His subsequent series work includes Nightwing, on which he was the regular penciler for issues #71-84 from 2002 to 2003 and Batgirl, of which he drew issues #45–52 from 2003 to 2004. Subsequent miniseries he drew include Star Wars: General Grievous in 2005, and the 2006 movie tie-in, Superman Returns Prequel #3. He followed up that with other superhero titles such as Superman #665 and #668 (2007), JLA: Classified #43 (November 2007), Witchblade #112 (January 2008), and the 2008 miniseries DC Universe: Decisions. Leonardi drew the Vigilante series that debuted from DC in December 2008.

Leonardi and inker Ande Parks are the illustrators on the 2019 Batman Beyond arc written by Dan Jurgens which debuted with issue #31 in April 2019. Although Leonardi had worked on Batman before, this assignment was his first time working on the future-based Batman Beyond, whose concept is similar to Spider-Man 2099, which Leonardi co-created.

Leonardi helped devise 3-D animation tools that could emulate his line work for the 2023 animated film Spider-Man: Across the Spider-Verse.

== Technique and materials ==
In a 2025 interview, when asked how he balanced the need to produce 22 pages on a monthly deadline with his desire to be artistically satisfied when the finished work, Leonardi related advice he received during his January 1980 interview at Marvel Comics by then-Art Director John Romita Sr. In looking over Leonardi's work, Romita said his pages were okay, but that on any page featuring a grid of 5 - 7 panels, only one panel should be an artistic "stretch", in which the artist attempts to express themselves artistically, and that the remaining panels should be what Romita called "repertory panels," or stock panels that the artist could "do in their sleep" such as silhouettes or foreground or background shots of characters talking. Romita explained that only that one panel should be a test of the artist’s artistic merit, because if every panel was a "fight," the artist would get "bogged down," and the process "is going to eat you alive."

When asked in a 2025 interview if he was still a traditionalist or had adopted digital methods to produce his art, Leonardi described his process as a "hybrid approach", in which he would first produce thumbnail sketches in pencil, before blowing them up to 11" x 17", and lightbox them onto Bristol board, where he would pencil them traditionally, before scanning the black lines at his local Kinkos onto a second piece of Bristol board, which would serve as the medium on which he would apply his inks with a brush or pen. The finished inks would then be scanned into a digital file, on which Leonardi would further "clean up" and modify the art in Procreate. One frequent task for which he relies on Procreate is to correct the proportions of the heads of his figures, which he says he frequently gets wrong in the penciling stage.

== Bibliography ==
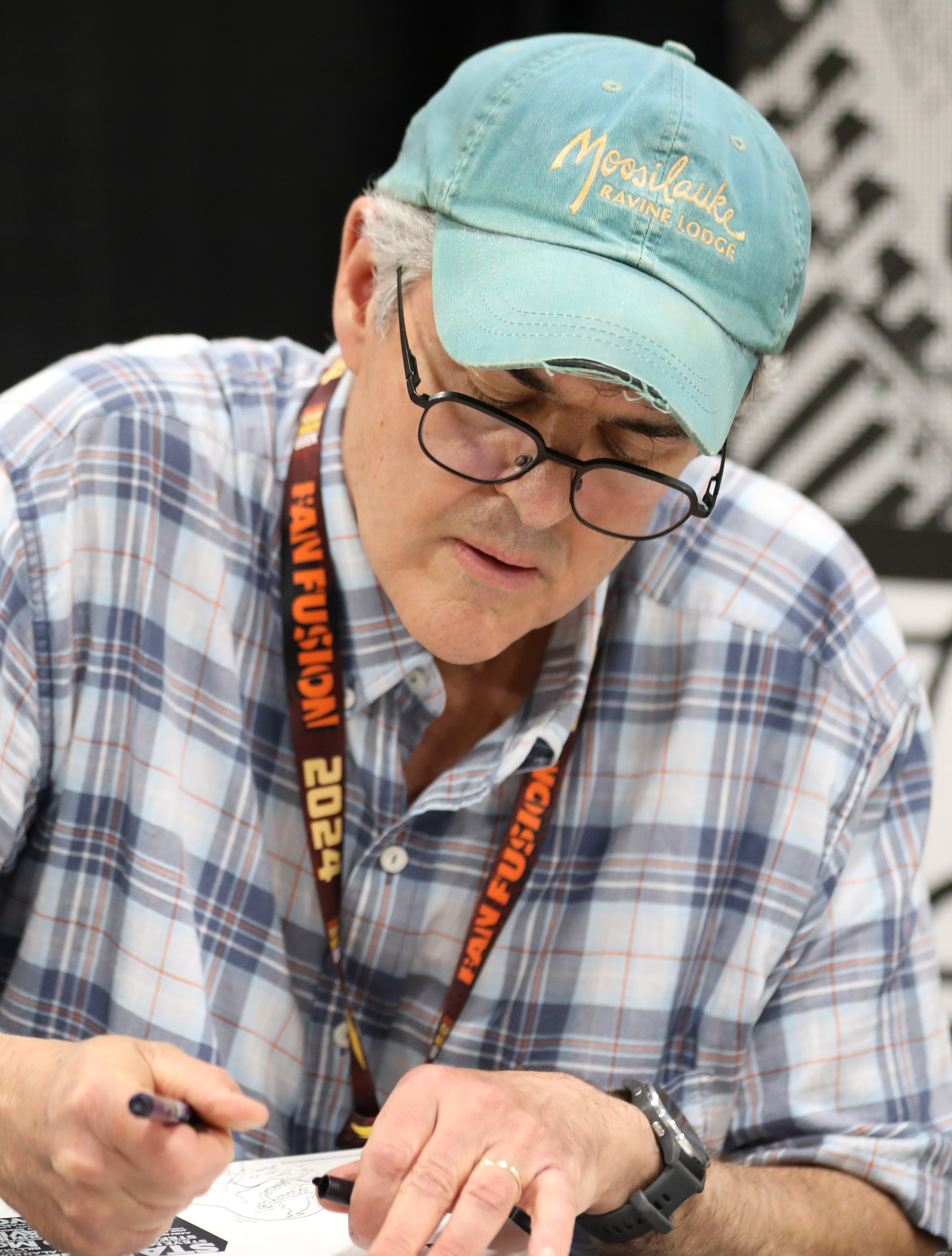
Leonardi at the 2024 Phoenix Fan Fusion

=== Dark Horse Comics ===
- Dark Horse Comics #1–2 (1992)
- Green Lantern Versus Aliens #1–4 (2000)
- Star Wars #8, 10 (1999)
- Star Wars: Darth Vader and the Lost Command #1–5 (2011)
- Star Wars: General Grievous #1–4 (2005)
- Star Wars Tales #3, 9 (2000–2001)

=== DC Comics ===
- Adam Strange Special #1 (2008)
- Astro City vol. 3 #44 (2017)
- Batgirl #45–47, 49–50, 52, 54 (2003–2004)
- Batman #400 (1986)
- Batman Beyond vol. 6 #31–36 (2019)
- Birds of Prey #39–41 (2002)
- Booster Gold vol. 2 #47 (2011)
- Booster Gold / The Flintstones Special #1 (2017)
- Convergence Batgirl #1–2 (2015)
- Convergence Batman: Shadow of the Bat #2 (2015)
- DC Universe: Decisions #1, 3 (2008)
- Fables #113 (2012)
- The Flintstones #7 (2017)
- Green Lantern/Huckleberry Hound Special #1 (2018)
- JLA: Classified #42–46 (2007–2008)
- Justice League Giant #1 (2018)
- Legion of Super-Heroes vol. 5 #47 (2008)
- Legion Worlds #4 (2001)
- New Teen Titans vol. 2 #22 (1986)
- Nightwing #57, 59, 71–75, 78–81, 83–84 (2001–2003)
- Nightwing: Our Worlds at War #1 (2001)
- Sandman Special #1 (2017)
- Scooby Apocalypse #17 (2017)
- Secret Origins vol. 2 #20 (Batgirl) (1987)
- Showcase '96 #7 (1996)
- Sovereign Seven Annual #2 (1996)
- Suicide Squad vol. 3 #23 (2013)
- Supergirl vol. 5 #27 (2008)
- Superman #665, 668–670, 712 (2007–2011)
- Superman Returns Prequel #3 (2006)
- Vigilante vol. 2 #1–4, 7–10, 12 (2009–2010)
- Who's Who: The Definitive Directory of the DC Universe #14 (1986)
- Who's Who: Update '87 #1 (1987)

=== Event Comics ===
- Painkiller Jane #1–5 (1997)
- Painkiller Jane/Hellboy #1 (1998)

=== Marvel Comics ===
- The Amazing Spider-Man # 228, 253–254, 279, 282 (1982–1986)
- Cable/Machine Man '98 #1 (1998)
- Classic X-Men #37 (1989)
- Cloak and Dagger #1–4 (1983)
- Cloak and Dagger vol. 2 #1–4, 6 (1985–1986)
- Cloak and Dagger vol. 3 #12–16 (1990–1991)
- Daredevil #248–249, 277 (1987–1990)
- Excalibur #19 (1990)
- Excalibur: Air Apparent #1 (1992)
- Excalibur: XX Crossing #1 (1992)
- Fantastic Four 2099 #1 (1996)
- Generation X #24 (1997)
- Giant-Size X-Men #4 (2005)
- Impossible Man #2 (1991)
- The Incredible Hulk Annual #10 (1981)
- Marvel Comics Presents #10–17 (Colossus); #101–106 (Ghost Rider/Doctor Strange) (1989–1992)
- Marvel Fanfare #14, 19 (1984–1985)
- Marvel Holiday Special #4–5 (1995–1997)
- New Mutants #38, 52–53, 78 (1986–1989)
- New Thunderbolts #96–97 (2006)
- Phoenix Resurrection: Revelations #1 (1995)
- The Rampaging Hulk vol. 2 #1–3, 5–6 (1998–1999)
- Sentry/Spider-Man #1 (2001)
- Sleepwalker #4 (1991)
- The Spectacular Spider-Man # 52, 71 (1981–1982)
- Spider-Man #17 (1991)
- Spider-Man 2099 #1–8, 10–13, 15–17, 19–20, 22–25 (1992–1994)
- Spider-Man/Spider-Man 2099 #1 (1996)
- Tales of the Marvel Universe #1 (1997)
- Thor #303, 309 (1981)
- Uncanny X-Men #201, 212, 228, 231, 235, 237, 252 (1986–1989)
- The Vision and the Scarlet Witch #1–4 (1982–1983)
- Warlock and the Infinity Watch #3–4 (1992)
- X-Man #31 (1997)
- X-Men '99 Annual #1 (1999)
- X-Men: True Friends #1–3 (1999)

=== New Paradigm Studios ===
- Watson and Holmes #1 (2013)

Preceded by n/a	Spider-Man 2099 penciller 1992–1994	Succeeded by Joe St. Pierre
Preceded by William Rosado	Nightwing penciller 2002–2003	Succeeded by Michael Lilly
