= Gavin King (disambiguation) =

Gavin King may refer to:

- Gavin King, an Australian journalist and author
- Gavin King (musician), a Welsh DJ better known by his stage name Aphrodite
- Gavin King (DC Comics), a fictional character from DC Comics who goes by the codename Orpheus
