= Green Lantern Versus Aliens =

Limited series comic book

Green Lantern versus Aliens
- Cover to Green Lantern Versus Aliens #1, by Dwayne Turner.

Publication information
- Publisher: DC Comics / Dark Horse Comics
- Schedule: Monthly
- Format: Limited series
- Publication date: September 2000 - December 2000
- No. of issues: 4

Creative team
- Written by: Ron Marz
- Penciller: Rick Leonardi
- Inker: Mike Perkins

Collected editions
- Green Lantern Versus Aliens: ISBN 1-56971-538-6

Green Lantern versus Aliens is a four-issue comic book intercompany crossover mini-series published jointly by DC Comics and Dark Horse Comics monthly from September to December 2000. It is written by Ron Marz and illustrated by penciller Rick Leonardi and inker Mike Perkins, with covers by Dwayne Turner. In 2001, the series was collected into a single volume with a new cover by artist Eric Kohler. The series stars several Green Lanterns, primarily Kyle Rayner, and the titular Xenomorphs from the Alien films. The story is apparently outside of DC Comics Universe canon, as Brik and Salaak are alive in current Green Lantern continuity; the series is set sometime after the destruction of the original Green Lantern Corps.

== Plot ==
Barin Char, the Green Lantern of Sector 1522, is killed by a chestburster. Hal Jordan is summoned by the Guardians of the Universe to rendezvous with fellow Green Lanterns Kilowog, Katma Tui, Tomar-Re, Green Man, and Salaak on the planet Tirama in Sector 1522. The Green Lanterns are informed of Char's disappearance and proceed to the border world where he is believed to have disappeared. Tracing the signal from Char's displaced power ring, the Lantern enter a cavern inside a mountainous butte, where they discover Char's corpse before being attacked by a swarm of Xenomorphs. Jordan, believing the Xenomorphs to be predatory rather than truly malevolent, decides to transport them to the planet Mogo to prevent them from harming others.

A decade later, the Signet Dawn, a Coluan transport vessel carrying ore, crashes onto Mogo. The aliens Tomar-Dar, Brik, Ash, M'Hdahna, and Salaak arrive at the apartment of Green Lantern Kyle Rayner and inform him of the Signet Dawn's crash on Mogo. The six then journey to Mogo to rescue the ship's crew. Inside the hull of the ship, they encounter Crowe, the ship's first officer, who tells Rayner that after the crash, the aliens carried off the other 37 crew members but left her behind. Crowe leads Rayner and the others deeper into the ship, where the Xenomorphs attack them, taking Rayner's companions captive, leaving only him, Crowe, and Salaak. When Rayner tries to grab Tomar-Dar, Rayner's power ring slips off his finger and falls down the shaft.

The trio then climbs down the shaft—Rayner and Salaak subsequently settling any remaining tension between them when Salaak apologizes for judging Rayner by what he was not rather than what he was—and discover five of Crowe's crewmates cocooned by the Xenomorphs, four of whom have been killed by chestbursters. The Xenomorphs then attack the trio, and Crowe and Rayner flee through a passageway, separated from Salaak. They then come across a chamber where they discover a Xenomorph queen with the remainder of Crowe's crew and Rayner's companions cocooned around the walls and Rayner's power ring on the floor. After exchanging a brief kiss for luck, Crowe jumps into the chamber firing at the aliens to distract them while Rayner goes for his ring. During this attempt, the skin on the right half of Crowe's face is ripped away, revealing that she is a gynoid. Rayner reacquires his ring. Crowe, fatally damaged during the melee, tells Rayner that he should not leave the Xenomorphs alive to endanger someone else in the future as Jordan did. Rayner destroys the Xenomorphs, rescuing the surviving Signet Dawn crew and his companions. Ash, Brik and Salaak do not survive.

== Collected edition ==
- Green Lantern versus Aliens (96 pages, September, Titan Books, ISBN 1-84023-283-8, August 2001, Dark Horse, ISBN 1-56971-538-6)
