= The Dregs =

American comedy folk band

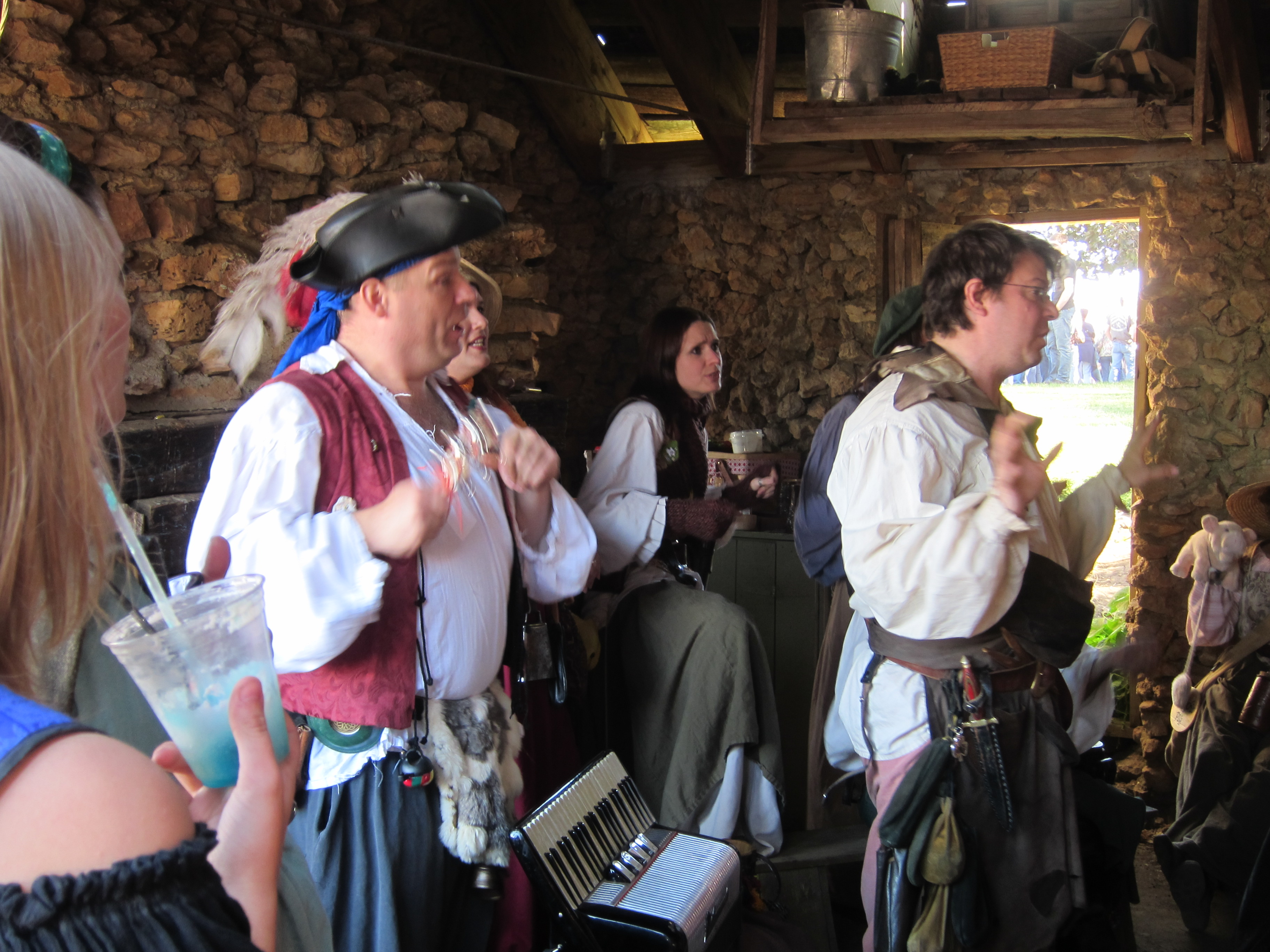
The Dregs performing at Mac's Pub at the Minnesota Renaissance Festival.

The Dregs are a comedy folk band of six performers based in the Twin Cities region of Minnesota. Live performances are partially improvised. They perform around the Midwest and have recorded eight albums.

== History ==
The Dregs began as an a cappella group formed by improv comedian and bodhrán drummer Tim Wick at the Minnesota Renaissance Festival in 2001 under the moniker "Pub Kin". It consisted loosely of over a dozen members who were meant to serve drinks and entertain patrons of Mac's Pub, a vacant merchant shop turned ale house with an Irish theme. In practice, it became problematic for performers to operate the pub on their own, so tending bar became the responsibility of the Minnesota Jaycees, and Pub Kin was reduced to purely a music act.

In 2002, the band was pared down to just five members and added elements of improv comedy to their performances. Soon thereafter, the band began making public appearances at venues outside of the Minnesota Renaissance Festival. The Dregs released their first album "Are You Gonna Drink That?" in 2003, consisting of traditional Irish ballads, silly drinking tunes, and bawdy songs. Expanding beyond a cappella, the album included several songs with accompaniment by guitarist Sean Larson. Impressed with the musical talents of their recording engineer, The Dregs asked Chad Dutton to join the act. In 2005 they released another full-length album "Our Drunk Goes to Eleven" and the CD Single "Johnny Jump-Up".

Half of the cast stepped down from The Dregs in late 2005 and were soon replaced by Rachael Salisbury, Frost Simula, and Angelina Lais. To highlight the new talent, the band released a live album, "Uncorked," in 2007, and another studio album "Thank You, Sir. May I Have Another?" just a year later in 2008. By this time, the band had established itself as a local comedy and music act with several bars, music venues, conventions, and private events in the Minneapolis/St. Paul metropolitan area, as well as additional Renaissance faires in the Midwest.

Vocalist and comedian Angelia Lais departed from the act following The Dregs Holiday Special performance in December 2009. Interested in expanding instrumentation, mezzo-soprano and violinist (and occasional violist/mandolin player) Molly Zupon was recruited in early 2010. Frost Simula left the band at the end of 2011 at which time Geoffrey M. Brown, who had been participating with The Dregs throughout 2011, joined the group as the guitarist.

The Dregs released their seventh album "Do It Like You're Drunk" in 2012. In 2013, The Dregs took their comedy show to the Minnesota Fringe Festival in a tongue and cheek one-act called 'A Brief History of Irish Music'. Also in 2013, they collaborated with fellow local Irish band Four Pints Shy on live recording, "2 Bands 1 Show".

Geoffrey Brown left The Dregs in 2015 to pursue other artistic ventures, and Paul Score joined The Dregs as the guitarist in 2016. In 2017, Chad Dutton left the band, and djembe player and accordionist Trevor Hartman joined. Trevor and Paul bring with them years of experience and camaraderie as they performed together in the Renaissance Festival band 'Folk Underground', which opened for Minnesota Renaissance iconic comedy group Puke and Snot.

Rachael Salisbury died in March of 2020 and the band continued as a quintet until 2023 when Rian Vellichor was added as an additional guitarist and vocalist.

The Dregs continue to play at the Minnesota Renaissance Festival at Mac's Pub.

== Popularity ==
The Dregs have been featured most prominently at their birthplace, the Minnesota Renaissance Festival. They make nearly a dozen appearances per day, costumed and acting as a peasant Irish band, and are still a mainstay at Mac's Pub. Similar performances have been at the Siouxland Renaissance Festival in Sioux Falls, SD, Riverssance Festival in Sioux City, Iowa, and at the Olde World Renaissance Faire in Twig, MN.

While music is a vehicle for their comedy, The Dregs main draw is a combination of their stage antics and their ridiculous lyrics. Themes which garner the most attention are songs about science fiction, rednecks, chickens, and zombies. To date, their most popular song is the apocalyptic undead ballad "Zombies in the Shire", featured on the album "Thank You, Sir. May I Have Another?"

== Discography ==
=== Are You Gonna Drink That? ===
Released: 2003
Recorded at: Rainbow Records
Engineered by: Chad Dutton
Album art by: Christopher Jones

=== Our Drunk Goes to Eleven ===
Released: 2005
Recorded at: Rainbow Records
Engineered by: Chad Dutton
Album art by: Christopher Jones

=== Johnny Jump-Up ===
Released: 2005
Engineered by: Chad Dutton
Album art by: Christopher Marcy

=== Uncorked ===
Released: 2008
Engineered by: Chad Dutton
Album art by: Frost Simula

=== Thank You, Sir. May I Have Another? ===
Released: 2008
Recorded at: Curbside Studios
Engineered by: Chad Dutton
Album art by: Frost Simula

=== Dreggnog ===
Released: 2011
Recorded at: Curbside Studios
Album art by: Frost Simula

=== Do It Like You're Drunk ===
Released: 2012
Recorded at: Shock and Awe Studio
Engineered by: Joey Olsen
Produced by: Rachael Salisbury
Mastered by: Chad Dutton
Album art by: Geoffrey M Brown

=== 2 Bands, 1 Show (with Four Pints Shy) ===
Released: 2013
Recorded live at: Parkway Theatre
Engineered by: Stephan Ahonen
Produced by: Chad Dutton
Album art by: Geoffrey M Brown

=== Shut Up And Sing! ===
Released: 2019
Recorded at: Wild Sound Recording Studio
Engineered by: Steve Kaul
Album art by: Lindsay Jane

== Cast ==
=== Current members ===
- Tim Wick - bodhrán, vocals
- Susanne Becker - percussion, vocals
- Molly Zupon - violin, mandolin, viola, vocals
- Paul Score - guitar, vocals
- Trevor Hartman - accordion, keyboard, percussion, vocals
- Rian Vellichor - guitar, vocals

=== Past members ===
- Chad Dutton
- Geoffrey M. Brown
- Amanda Gordon
- Julie Jackson
- Angelina Lais
- Sean Larson
- Rachael Salisbury
- Frost Simula
- Tonya Wershow
