= The Flash Girls =

The Flash Girls are a now defunct folk music duo based out of Minneapolis, Minnesota. The duo consisted of Emma Bull, a noted science fiction author, and Lorraine Garland, also known as "The Fabulous Lorraine". Garland is also notable as Neil Gaiman's personal assistant; the group formed at a Guy Fawkes Day party at Gaiman's home. The connections that both Bull and Garland had with the science fiction and fantasy communities allowed them to have an unusually notable group of people writing songs for and with them, including Jane Yolen, Alan Moore, and Neil Gaiman. These songs are mixed in with their own original works, traditional songs such as Star of the County Down and Lily of the West, as well as poems put to music, including works by Dorothy Parker and A.A. Milne.

The group has three albums, The Return of Pansy Smith and Violet Jones (1993), Maurice and I (1994), and Play Each Morning Wild Queen (2001). Following their second album, the pair split up due to Bull moving to California to pursue screenwriting. Since then, Garland joined the band Folk UnderGround. During their time apart between "Maurice and I" and "Wild Queen," the duo continued to write material, and in early 2001 Bull flew back to Minneapolis for an intense two-weeks of recording sessions. They intended to perform a concert with the new material, but while the band was setting up for the concert Bull fell and broke both her arms. The Flash Girls did manage to do a few performances in 2001 with a session musician covering Bull's guitar parts, but apparently have performed together infrequently since.

One recent appearance was at ConFusion 2005, aka 31 Flavors of ConFusion, where Bull with Will Shetterly were Author Guests of Honor. ConFusion is held in the Metro Detroit area every January. Garland and Bull performed together, per Steven Brust, ConFusion's Toastmaster that year.

Bull and Garland somehow landed their third-ever gig as the opening band for Warren Zevon to a packed crowd at Minneapolis' First Avenue Club. They were both extremely nervous, having been together for only a month. Garland said that if they screwed up in front of such a huge crowd, she was going to change her name to Pansy Smith and move into Gaiman's basement; in his blog, Gaiman says this was his suggestion. Bull agreed and said she'd join Garland and change her name to Violet Jones. Although the concert went off without a hitch, the pair adopted these names as their alter egos and made up a fictional history of a female Irish folk duo in the 1920s and used it as a theme for their first record, "The Return of Pansy Smith and Violet Jones." Pansy Smith and Violet Jones became characters in the DC Comics series Sovereign Seven, where they run a coffee shop.

The group's name came from the old Irish slang term "flash," which means well-dressed and of dubious reputation, or "knowing more than is socially acceptable." A number of folk songs mention "flash girls," most notably the one attributed by Bull's husband Will Shetterly as being the source for the group's name, "House-husband's Lament (Rocking the Cradle)." The line in question goes, "Come all you young men with a notion to marry/Oh, pray, won't you leave those flash girls alone."

Both The Flash Girls and Bull's former group, Cats Laughing, have been mentioned in Shetterly's stories for the fantasy fiction shared universe Borderland.
