= Sovereign Seven =

1995–98 DC Comics series

- Sovereign Seven #15 cover, artist Dwayne Turner. Clockwise from left: Network, Cascade, Indigo, Rampart, Reflex, Cruiser and Finale.

Publication information
- Publisher: DC Comics
- First appearance: Sovereign Seven #1 (April 1995)
- Created by: Chris Claremont (writer); Dwayne Turner (artist)

In-story information
- Member(s): Cascade; Indigo; Network; Finale; Rampart; Reflex; Cruiser; Power Girl

Sovereign Seven is a creator-owned American comic book series, created by Chris Claremont and Dwayne Turner, and published by DC Comics.

== Publication history ==
Launched in April 1995, Sovereign Seven was created by writer Chris Claremont and artist Dwayne Turner, and was Claremont's first professional regular series work since his departure from Marvel Comics and the X-Men franchise in 1991. It was the first creator-owned title set in the DC Universe.

The title met with middling success and was cancelled after 36 issues (three years), in June 1998, after which Claremont returned to Marvel.

== Fictional team history ==
The Sovereign Seven are a group of seven members of royal families from planets that were destroyed by a Rapture. Each was saved by the leader of the team - Cascade. The original group consists of Cascade, Finale, Rampart, Reflex, Indigo, Network and Cruiser. Rampart is killed and replaced by the DC character Power Girl in #31.

For a time, the group operates out of a mysterious coffee house (the "Crossroads Coffee Bar") which is larger on the inside than it is on the outside. Time portals open inside doorways to areas unfamiliar or well-known to the Sovereigns, who work as employees to earn their keep. The coffee house is run by supporting characters Violet Smith and Pansy Jones, comic-book counterparts of the musical alter-egos of Emma Bull and Lorraine Garland—The Flash Girls—of whom Claremont is a fan.

The Sovereign Seven battle villains including Darkseid, Maitresse, and the Female Furies.

== Membership ==
- Cascade (Rhian Douglas) is the leader of the Sovereign Seven and has the ability to cascade, or teleport, both herself and others. Her ability generally requires some knowledge of the destination or that she be provided with a "waypoint" by Network. Cascade fled her mother, Maitresse, who ruled Cascade's homeworld with unyielding omnipotence.
- Network (Taryn Haldane) is the first of the Sovereigns to meet Cascade, and is the motivating force behind gathering them. Network's homeworld is never detailed. She is a telepath, and never hesitates to draw the information she needs from the minds of those around her. It has been shown that when no other people are within range of her powers, or when her powers are suppressed, she is fully illiterate and aphasic, unable to read, speak, or understand any language. It is hinted in several storylines that Network would eventually become a terrorist for captured or controlled telepaths.
- Finale (Pahe Leilani Favaela) is a warrior from a society reminiscent of pre-American Hawaii. She is said to have come from a water world. She makes several references to Mother Ocean and The Great Orca. To defend her world from the Rapture, Finale was forced to kill her world and its inhabitants. As a result, Finale fears water since joining the Sovereigns. She fears what will happen if the Mother Ocean of Earth finds out who she is. Finale wears full body armor throughout the series, and we never truly see her face.
- Rampart (Jaffar Ibn Haroun Al Raschid) is a prince of a Muslim-like society. He has the ability to manifest force fields. He is generally considered to be attractive, as the local girls tend to swoon in his presence.
- Reflex (Walter Thorsson) is a speedster from a seemingly Nordic/Christian heritage. Unlike most characters with super-speed, both in DC and Marvel comics, Reflex is a large person. This causes some problems for him when dealing with normal, everyday things like typing. He does have, as his name suggests, well-honed reflexes.
- Cruiser (Nicholas Helicon) is a telekinetic who fuels his powers with his body mass. As a result, he's always hungry. Throughout the series, Cruiser goes from incredibly skinny and 'running on empty', to quite fat, but with plenty of power in reserve.
- Indigo is one of the most mysterious of the Sovereign Seven. 'He' is an enigma, without a true identity; even the pronoun "he" is arbitrary. When he desires it, Indigo can go completely unnoticed. His presence simply is not registered, whether it's in a dark hallway or a crowded street. He is also the consummate persuader. He can convince almost anyone (or anything) to do what he wants. He is a master infiltrator, able to get into and out of secure areas. He is also the Sovereigns' tactician, carrying out Cascade's orders no matter how difficult.
