= Spider-Man 2099 =

Comic book superhero

Miguel O'Hara Spider-Man 2099
- Spider-Man 2099 as depicted in Marvel Age Magazine #114 (October 1992). Art by Rick Leonardi.

Publication information
- Publisher: Marvel Comics
- First appearance: Preview: The Amazing Spider-Man #365 (August 1992); Full: Spider-Man 2099 #1 (November 1992)
- Created by: Peter David (writer); Rick Leonardi (artist)

In-story information
- Alter ego: Miguel O'Hara
- Species: Human mutate
- Place of origin: Nueva York, U.S. (Earth-928)
- Team affiliations: Exiles; Alchemax
- Abilities: Superhuman strength, stamina, durability, speed, agility, and reflexes; Accelerated healing and vision; Genius-level intellect; Wall-crawling via talons on fingers; Organic webbing from forearms; Paralytic venom via fangs; Gliding via air-foil on indestructible costume; Mastery of acrobatics and combat

Spider-Man 2099 is a superhero appearing in American comic books published by Marvel Comics. The character was created by Peter David and Rick Leonardi in 1992 for the Marvel 2099 comic book line, and he is a futuristic re-imagining of the original Spider-Man created by Stan Lee and Steve Ditko. His true identity is Miguel O'Hara, an Irish-Mexican geneticist living in Nueva York (a renamed New York City) in the year 2099 who attempts to re-create the abilities of the original Spider-Man in other people. An accident causes half of his DNA to be rewritten with a spider's genetic code, granting him powers identical to those of the original Spider-Man, with several notable exceptions. For instance, he lacks a "spider-sense" but has sharp talons protruding from his fingers and can secrete a paralyzing venom.

The character has appeared in several media adaptations outside of comics. His first significant non-comic book role was in the 2010 video game Spider-Man: Shattered Dimensions, where he was voiced by Dan Gilvezan, and its 2011 sequel Spider-Man: Edge of Time, voiced by Christopher Daniel Barnes. In the 2012 animated series Ultimate Spider-Man, he was voiced by Freddy Rodriguez. The character made his cinematic debut in the animated film Spider-Man: Into the Spider-Verse (2018), voiced by Oscar Isaac, who reprised his role in the sequel, Spider-Man: Across the Spider-Verse (2023).

== Publication history ==
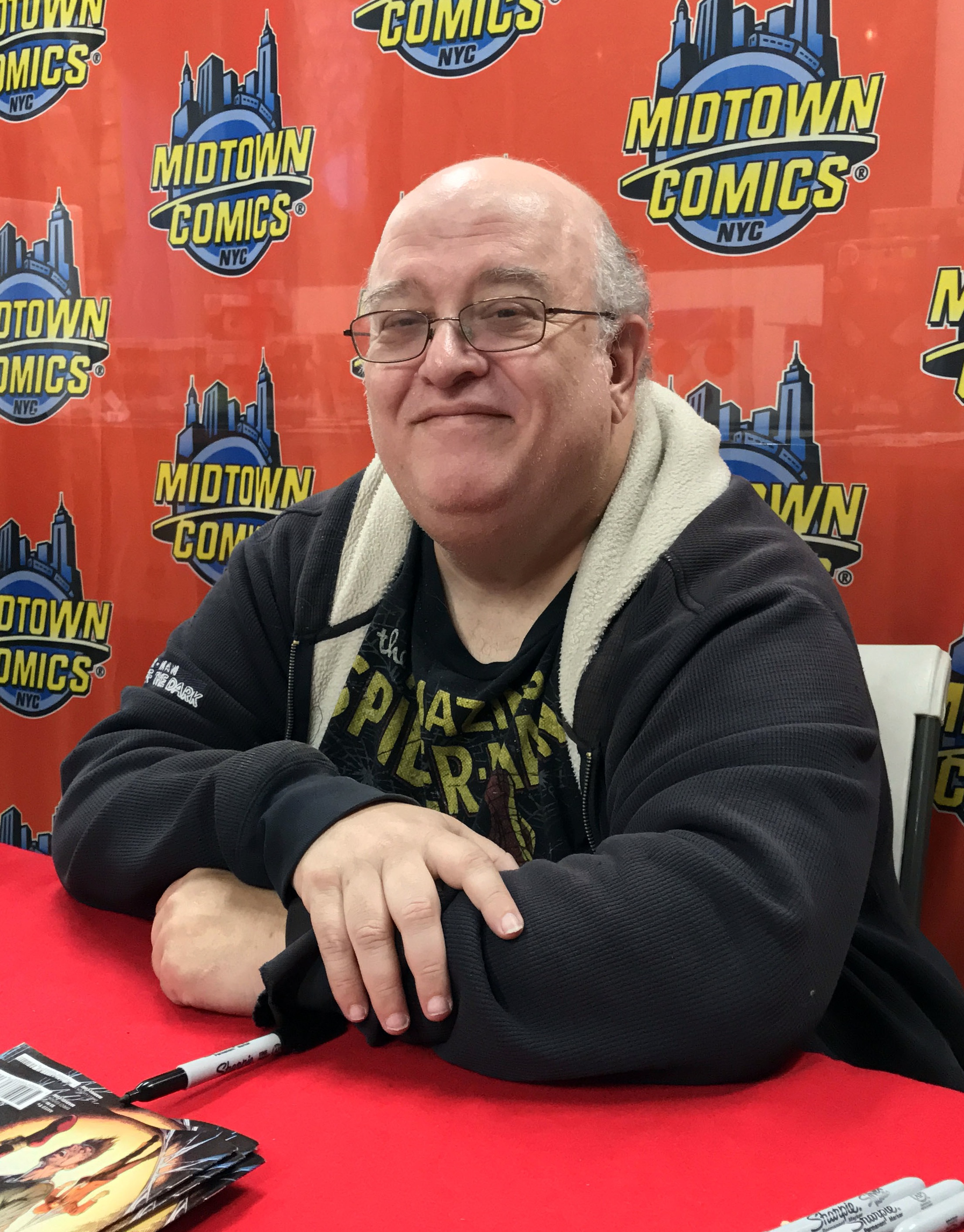
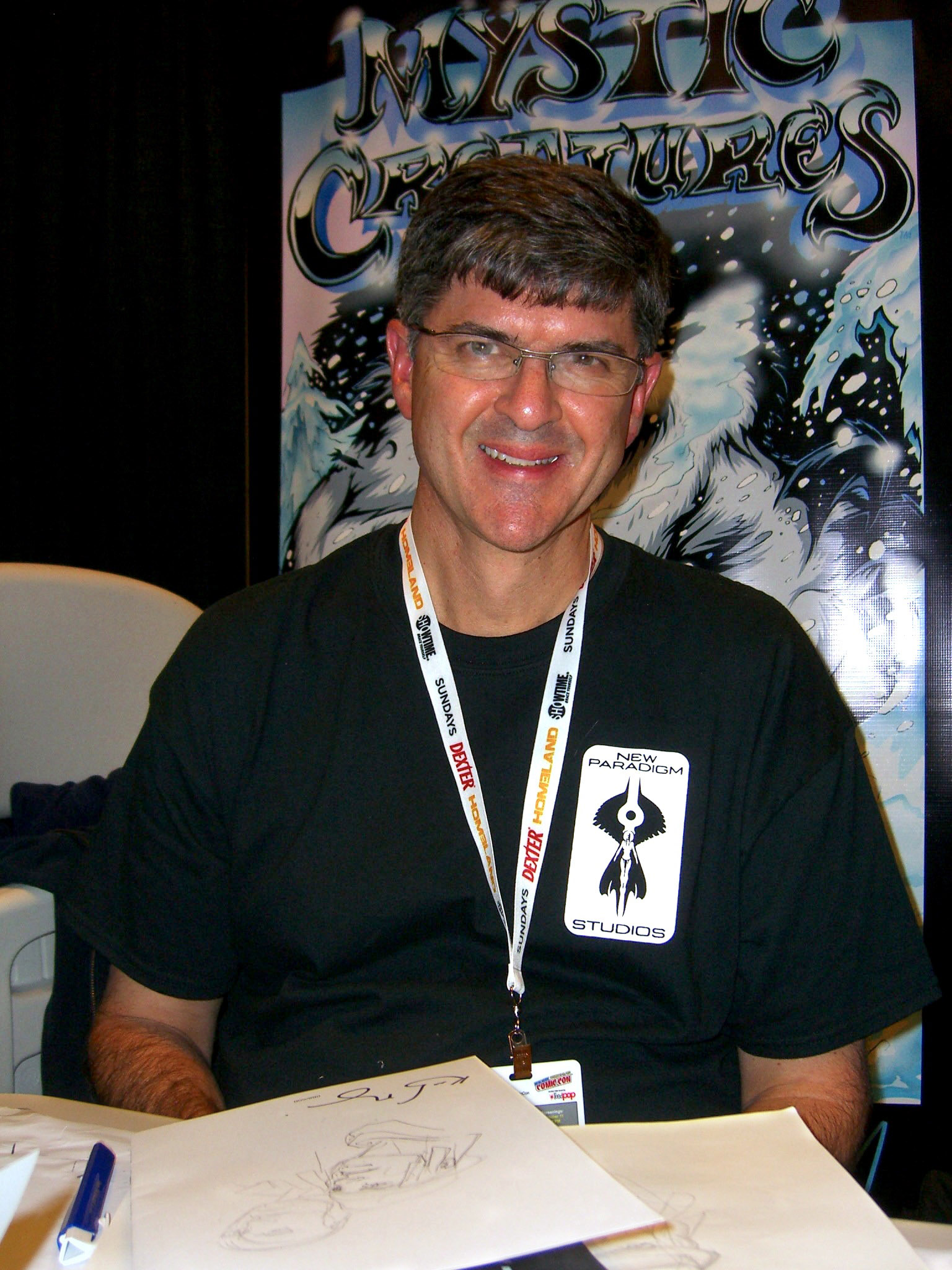
Writer Peter David and artist Rick Leonardi, who launched the first Spider-Man 2099 series in 1992

Spider-Man 2099 was one of the many Marvel characters to be re-imagined for the Marvel 2099 comic book line that showed future versions of classic Marvel characters living in the year 2099, approximately 107 years after the then-current Marvel Universe time period. Spider-Man 2099 was first featured in a five-page sneak preview of the first issue of his then-upcoming series in the 30th-anniversary issue of The Amazing Spider-Man. The Spider-Man 2099 series' first issue appeared shortly afterward. When originally published, the Marvel 2099 stories were meant to depict the official future of the Marvel Universe: a dystopian America governed by corrupt megacorporations with a number of cyberpunk elements.

The character was originally designed by artist Rick Leonardi, with Peter David brought onto the series as writer to flesh out the character's alter ego, Miguel O'Hara, and supporting characters. Spider-Man 2099 #1 was written by Peter David, pencilled by Rick Leonardi, inked by Al Williamson, and lettered by Rick Parker. David named the character after his friend, actor Miguel Ferrer. Spider-Man 2099 #1 is the highest-selling single issue of any comic written by Peter David.

Although the book was continuously selling more than 100,000 copies per issue, the book and entire 2099 comic line underwent a drastic shift, in early 1996, with the firing of the 2099 series editor Joey Cavalieri. At this time, Marvel's finances and future were unstable, and sudden firings were quite common. Like virtually all of the other writers in the line, Peter David chose to show solidarity with his editor, and he resigned from the book with issue #44. Marvel turned the 2099 titles over to fill-in writers and editors. The last two issues of Spider-Man 2099 were done without Peter David's input and the series ended with issue #46. A few months later, Marvel announced they would publish a new 2099 title, 2099: World of Tomorrow, immediately following the last issues of the original titles, under the new staff. The new bi-monthly title lasted eight issues and was meant to serve as a finale for the 2099 line and the end of its regular publication.

Miguel O'Hara was seen again without a costume in 1998 in 2099: Manifest Destiny, a one-shot issue intended to bring further closure to the 2099 line and its unresolved storylines. The character has since made several cameo and guest appearances in such titles as Captain Marvel vol. 3 #27–30 (written by Peter David) and in Exiles #75–99. Marvel published a collected edition of the first ten issues of the original series in April 2009 and a second collection in October 2013 collecting up to #14. Spider-Man 2099 next appeared in The Superior Spider-Man #17–19 in September and October 2013, with Miguel O'Hara stranded in the mainstream Marvel timeline at the end of the story.

The character and setting were reimagined for the Timestorm 2009–2099 four-issue limited series published from April to August 2009. Although bearing the Spider-Man 2099 moniker, it is a different version of the character.

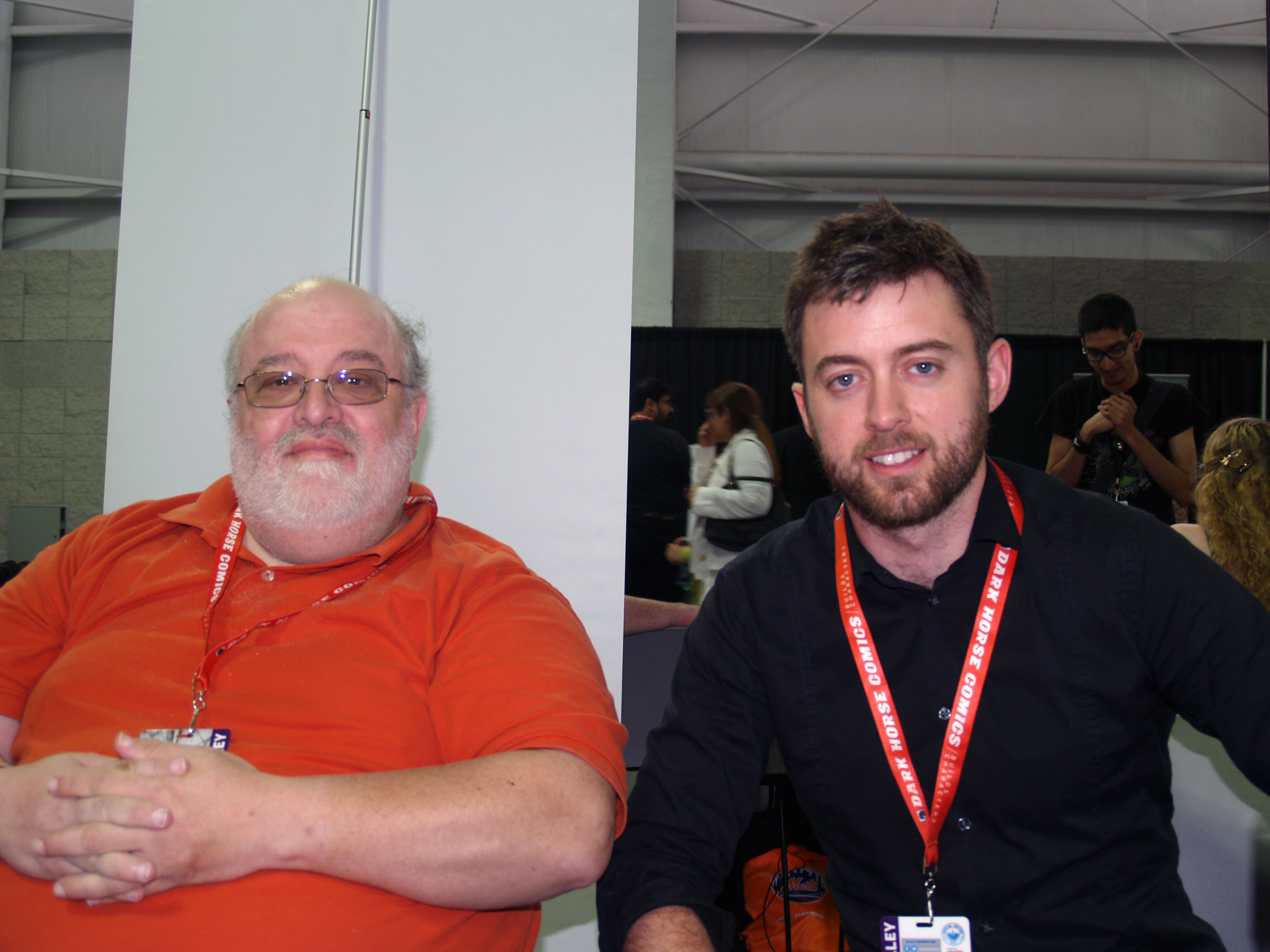
Writer Peter David and artist Will Sliney, the creative team on the 2014 series

In the 2013 "Necessary Evil" storyline in The Superior Spider-Man, the character is stranded in the present. In July 2014 Marvel launched a second Spider-Man 2099 series, with Peter David returning as writer, Will Sliney as artist, and Simone Bianchi illustrating the first issue's cover. The character appears in the 2014 "Spider-Verse" crossover storyline that involves different versions of Spider-Man, including Peter Parker. After 12 issues, the comic was re-launched in December 2015 as Spider-Man 2099 Volume 3. The new series ends with Spider-Man 2099 (vol. 3) #25 (September 2017), in which Miguel O'Hara returns to 2099. The final story arc also introduces a second character using the Spider-Man 2099 identity.

== Fictional character biography ==
=== Early years ===
Miguel O'Hara was born in New York City (futuristically called Nueva York), many years after the end of what his people's history calls the "Heroic Age", which is the modern-day era of Marvel heroes, he was born after his mother Conchata had an affair with his father's boss. He grows up with his mother Conchata, his younger brother Gabriel, and his abusive father George O'Hara. A rebellious boy with prodigy-level intelligence, Miguel is an adolescent when he is awarded enrollment into the Alchemax School for Gifted Youngsters (heavily implied to be a renovated version of the X-Men's headquarters) in Westchester, owned by the powerful Alchemax megacorporation which also controls local law enforcement agencies. Here, he befriends Xina Kwan, a girl of similar intelligence who specializes in computers. Xina helps Miguel defend himself against the bully Kron Stone, son of Tyler Stone: Vice President of R&D for Alchemax. Miguel and Xina become best friends and later develop romantic feelings for each other. As adults, Miguel and Xina date seriously until Miguel cheats on her with Dana D'Angelo, who is the girlfriend of Miguel's brother Gabe. Later on, Miguel and Dana are engaged. In the Dissecting Spider-Man editorial, it is stated that Miguel purposely self-sabotaged his romantic relationship with Xina by cheating on her with Dana because Xina challenged his superiority complex by being his intellectual equal: "He had felt somewhat disconcerted, his master of his environment threatened, whenever Xina was around." Whereas Dana was "ideal" in the sense that she cared for Miguel and was "bright enough not to annoy him, but not so sharp that she was a threat". Though seemingly arrogant and confident in all walks of life, Miguel is a very private man and trusts almost no one except for Lyla, an AI assistant whom Xina created as a gift for him.

=== Origin as Spider-Man ===
Miguel O'Hara's debut from pages 2 and 3 of Spider-Man 2099 #1, previewed at The Amazing Spider-Man #365 (August 1992). Art by Rick Leonardi.

Miguel eventually becomes head of the genetics program of Alchemax, intended to create new controlled super-powered soldiers called "corporate raiders." Miguel is specifically inspired by surviving records concerning Spider-Man and hopes to one day create a similarly powered person. But after a human test subject dies during an early experiment, Miguel tells Tyler Stone he wishes to resign from Alchemax and discontinue his genetics research. Rather than let Miguel leave, Tyler Stone tricks him into taking Rapture, an addictive drug that genetically bonds to the user. Tyler reminds Miguel that only Alchemax is allowed to legally distribute this drug, so if O'Hara does not remain with the corporation then Tyler must assume he is getting the drug from the black market and will be forced to tell the police. Not wishing to be a blackmailed addict, Miguel recalls that he entered his own genetic code into his machine's databanks during initial experiments, using it as a human DNA test sample. Intending to use this older template of his pure genetic code to write over his current biology and free himself from the Rapture, Miguel sneaks into Alchemax and uses the gene alteration machines on himself.

After Miguel turns on the machine to rewrite his DNA, his jealous subordinate Aaron Delgado sabotages the machines, causing them to alter Miguel's genetic code to be "50% spider DNA." Miguel survives the process, but realizes he now has spider-abilities. Realizing that there is now a person with abilities similar to Spider-Man, Tyler Stone sends agents to hunt this person. To conceal his identity while he fights his pursuers, Miguel dons a bodysuit with a mask that he once wore for the Mexican Day of the Dead festival. Miguel chooses this costume in particular because it is the only clothing he has that is made from "UMF" (Unstable Molecule Fabric), meaning it is the only clothing he owns that will not be torn or shred by the spider-talons that now occupy his hands and feet. After seeing him operate in public, a group of Thorites (worshippers of the Marvel hero Thor) come to believe that Miguel is the legendary Spider-Man back from the dead, and that he is the harbinger of Thor's eventual return.

=== Heroic career ===
Originally focused on finding a cure for his condition, Miguel's further adventures as Spider-Man 2099 cause him to realize how ignorant of the world he was and how he had turned a blind eye to the oppression and pain the corporations of the world have caused. He is also surprised at the effect his presence has on the people who have been oppressed for so long, particularly his own mother, who ironically also hates the man her eldest son has become yet admires the exploits of Spider-Man 2099. After this, Miguel decides to embrace his identity as Spider-Man. Donning his costume, he publicly proclaims himself to be an enemy to all the megacorps, saying he will use his powers to fight for ordinary people against those in power who abuse their influence and authority.

Later on, Miguel discovers that an arrogant scientist at Alchemax called Jordan Boone is conducting "Virtual Unreality" experiments to create a doorway into another dimension. These experiments lead to the release of two mysterious figures: the Net Prophet, called "the prophet of Thor" by the Thorites, and a powerful megalomaniac called Thanatos. The Net Prophet becomes a new ally to Miguel. Since the Net Prophet is believed to be Thor's prophet, his association with Spider-Man 2099 leads more people to believe that Miguel's alter ego is the harbinger of Thor. In the "Time Flies Saga" that occurs years later in Peter David's Captain Marvel series, it is revealed that the Net Prophet is actually the hero Justice (John Tensen) and that Thanatos is a corrupt version of Rick Jones from Earth-9309.

The first major crossover of Marvel 2099 happens when Miguel and Dana visit Alchemax's floating city "Valhalla" and are startled by the sudden appearance of two men claiming to be Thor and Heimdall, respectively. It is later discovered that Alchemax CEO Avatarr has transformed ordinary people into duplicates of the Asgardians to eliminate the rising influence of new superheroes over the public. By joining forces, Doom, Ravage, the Punisher (Jake Gallows), the X-Men, and Spider-Man 2099 are able to defeat the fake Aesir, and Valhalla falls. Miguel later learns that Gabe is aware of his dual identity, having recognized Spider-Man's costume from what Miguel wore to the Day of the Dead festival years earlier. Gabe has grown a bit resentful of Miguel's new heroic career, particularly since his girlfriend Kasey seems enamored with the costumed Spider-Man 2099. After his holographic aide Lyla suffers a serious malfunction, rather than replace Lyla, Miguel asks for repairs from his ex-girlfriend Xina because she is the only who can fix Lyla. Dana later accuses Miguel of cheating on her with Xina. Miguel becomes angry about this and about Dana's noticeably increasing interest in Tyler Stone. The two dissolve their romantic relationship, and Xina and Miguel become companions again.

=== Spider-Man 2099 Meets Spider-Man ===
In the 1995 one-shot Spider-Man 2099 Meets Spider-Man, Miguel and Peter Parker, the Spider-Man of the Heroic Age, find themselves having switched places, with Miguel waking up next to Peter's wife, Mary Jane, and Spider-Man finding himself in the future. They discover that their predicament is caused by Fujikawa (in the Modern Age) and Alchemax (in the year 2099) running experiments on a temporal energy generator. While Peter tackles the Vulture of 2099, Miguel faces Venom (Eddie Brock). Miguel realizes that this temporal anomaly is what will cause the end of the Heroic Age, since where he is in the past is when history tells him all the heroes and much of Earth's culture and technology were wiped out. The two Spider-Man characters were united to face a major cause of the chaos, a time-traveling female Hobgoblin of the year 2211 (Robin Borne) from the alternative universe of Earth-9500. They are aided by this Hobgoblin's father, Spider-Man (Max Borne), and eventually everyone is sent back to their respective times.

=== Revelations, Nightshade, and "One Nation Under Doom" ===
While eavesdropping on a conversation between his mother and Tyler Stone, Miguel learns that the Rapture that Stone gave him was only a short-lasting simulation and would have worn off in time. He also learns that Tyler Stone is his real father. Bothered by this, he leaves New York to go traveling with Xina. During this time, they travel to Nightshade, an independent research town (free of megacorp rule) run by Angela Daskelakis, their former headmistress at the Alchemax institute. While they are visiting, Alchemax attempts a hostile takeover of Nightshade, destroying most of the city and killing Angela in the process. Xina returns home and Miguel disappears into the desert, saved by a group of scavengers. As Spider-Man, they ask him to try and fix an old homunculus-like robot they had found. After seeing Spider-Man's mask, it transforms itself into a hybrid of the present day Spider-Man and Venom, naming itself Flipside. Seemingly harmless at first, the robot begins showing psychopathic and homicidal tendencies. Miguel escapes, leaving the scavengers to Flipside's mercy and returns to New York. Upon his return, Miguel finds out that Doom 2099 has assumed control over the U.S. and its megacorps. Tyler Stone is appointed as Doom's Corporate Minister and Miguel is offered the seat of CEO of Alchemax. Later, Doom 2099 offers Spider-Man 2099 the position of Minister of Supernormal Affairs. Miguel eventually accepts the position at Alchemax, deciding to change the company for the better. He also uses his new influence to order law enforcement to leave Spider-Man 2099 alone.

=== Venom, Submariner, and Goblin 2099 ===
After assuming his new position of power, Miguel winds up encountering a modern version of the original Spider-Man's enemy Venom. The Venom symbiote, still alive, though slightly altered, takes on a new host body and attacks Tyler Stone, currently hospitalized after being shot. During a later battle between Spider-Man 2099 and Venom 2099, Dana is killed. Soon after this, a new villain called the Goblin appears and begins a smear campaign against Spider-Man 2099, displaying out-of-context evidence that implies he is actually a tool of the corporations and only pretends to be a hero of the people. Miguel hopes to get aid from Doom 2099, but the monarch is then removed from power. Meanwhile, as Miguel O'Hara, he must deal with Alchemax business, including an uprising by the bio-engineered Neo-Atlanteans, who were bred as workers to complete Alchemax's underwater colony "Atlantis". Miguel gets help when his mother becomes his secretary, attempting to rebuild their relationship and confessing that she was the one who shot Tyler Stone. The neo-Atlanteans, led by Roman the new Sub-Mariner (a reverse spelling of the original, Namor), attack the city but are fended off by Spider-Man. As the Spider-Man 2099 series approached its end, Miguel confronts the Goblin again and learns that it is actually his brother Gabe, twisted by jealousy towards his brother. This story is put aside as the Phalanx approaches earth, flooding New York and paving the way for the Atlanteans to return en masse. The final volume sees the apparent deaths of Tyler Stone and Miguel's mother at the hands of the Atlanteans, as the Vulture destroys the Alchemax building. Miguel, along with Dana's sister, Jennifer, are left in an Alchemax airship, trying to decide where to find a safe place to go. In the Manifest Destiny one-shot his mother is said to have survived and in Superior Spider-Man #17 his father is revealed to be alive as well.

=== After series cancellation ===
In 2099: World of Tomorrow, the polar ice caps melt and a massive deluge kills most of the world's inhabitants. The remnants of humanity face a new threat from space: the techno-organic Phalanx. Spider-Man works together with Doom 2099 to end the invasion, in which Doom sacrifices himself for the survival of mankind. In the later one-shot 2099: Manifest Destiny, society rebuilds following the Phalanx invasion. Miguel reopens Alchemax to regain the lost technologies of the last two cataclysms of the century and restore civilization. It is revealed that Miguel and Xina are married when Miguel addresses Xina as "Mrs O'Hara" and the two share a kiss. Together, they reawaken Steve Rogers, offering him Thor's hammer Mjolnir. Jettisoned into space, Rogers passes Mjolnir back to Miguel, who is likewise deemed worthy enough to lift and wield the mystical hammer, gaining new power from it. Secretly aided by Zero Cochrane 2.0 (Ghost Rider 2099), Miguel rules for the next thousand years, ushering in an unprecedented age of enlightenment. Peace, morality, and progress spread from Earth to the surrounding worlds. In 3099, Rogers is once again revived and takes the hammer, leaving Miguel to retire and enjoy the rest of his life with his wife, Xina, by his side. Miguel O'Hara's journey from a cowardly, arrogant youth to superhero to galactic leader and icon comes to an end.

=== Stranded in the present ===
There are anomalies in the 2099 timeline and it is revealed that Tiberius Stone is Miguel O'Hara's grandfather and Tyler Stone's father. The story concludes with Tyler Stone stranding Miguel in the present and Miguel (aided by Lyla in a holographic wristwatch) taking the alias "Michael O'Mara" and becoming Tiberius's assistant to monitor the wrongdoings of the newly established Alchemax. Although the Superior Spider-Man (Otto Octavius's mind in Peter Parker's body) briefly betrays Miguel and leaves him fighting various hijacked Spider-Slayers when the Green Goblin launches a mass attack on New York, Miguel accepts Peter's explanation for his recent actions when he returns after being restored to his body reasoning that the story is too stupid to be anything but true. Although Spider-Man 2099 remains in the present to monitor Alchemax after Peter learns that it is being run by Norman Osborn.

Miguel learned that he and Liz Allan will have some significant impact on future history when a time-traveler from 2211 came back in time to try to kill him to prevent the consequences of their interaction, although Miguel nevertheless refused to either let the agent kill him or Liz. When Liz nearly discovers Miguel's identity, Miguel admits to his origin from the future without admitting to his role as Spider-Man. Roped into accompanying Tiberius Stone to sell Spider-Slayers to a foreign country, Miguel is forced to fight the Scorpion—who was hired by Alchemax to further test the Spider-Slayers—after Stone is captured by the local rebels, but Miguel manages to defeat Scorpion by tricking the Spider-Slayers into attacking him, while Stone's encounter with the rebels prompts him to change his mind about the original deal.

=== "Spider-Verse" ===
During the "Spider-Verse" storyline, Miguel O'Hara witnesses his Avenger, Timestorm, and Exiles counterparts are killed by Morlun when he received a vision of his two counterparts and before the Exiles version of him can flee to Earth-616. After the portal closes due to Morlun still feeling wary about Earth-616 Spider-Man following their last fight, Miguel leaves to find Peter Parker and to let him know what happened. He and the other 616/Main Universe Spider Heroes of Earth are recruited by Spider-UK, Mayday Parker Spider-Girl of Earth-982, and Spider-Ham to join the Spider-Army to combat Inheritors, who hunt down and devour the Spider Totems like them across the Multiverse. Using dimension-travel technology Miguel O'Hara is able to return to 2099 where the Inheritor Daemos is killed before being revived in a clone body; Miguel teams up with Lady Spider (May Reily), and Six-Armed Spider-Man to find the Inheritors' weaknesses. As revived Daemos is closing after him and his teammates, Miguel needs the Alchemax's help to investigate the Inheritors' weakness. As Daemos arrives in 2099, Six-Armed Spider-Man sacrifices his life to buy some time for Spider-Man 2099 and Lady Spider to create an energy field to trap Daemos.

With Daemos trapped in an energy field, Miguel assures Lady Spider that he will not get out, explaining that the energy level holding him multiplies exponentially the more he shoves at it. He then tells her that they have an appointment with Tyler Stone. Upon meeting, Miguel spots a ceiling laser pointed at him. Miguel is less than happy with Tyler for stranding him in 2014, Tyler points out that he has returned regardless. Miguel then requests the use of the lab adjacent to Daemos' cell so they can dissect his previous body. Though Tyler is hesitant to assist him, Miguel points out that he will have to go home sooner or later. As the Spiders get to work on Daemos' corpse, his reincarnation speaks to them through the cameras, boasting that he can't be contained, Miguel retorts that the energy field will kill him before he breaks free. As they get to work, Miguel asks Lady Spider to check out the interdimensional jumping device he obtained from another version of Miguel who tried to warn him about the Inheritors. He demonstrates how Alchemax's computers can show how to work the device, to Lady Spider's amazement. As Lady Spider figures out how to work the device, Daemos attempts to broker a deal; if they let him go, he promises that he and his siblings would leave them alone. After quickly failing to find an alternate food source for the Inheritors to ingest, Miguel rejects Daemos' offer for two reasons: One, he's evil. Two, he and Lady Spider would not sacrifice their counterparts to save their own skins. Miguel then runs over the bio lab to pick up something, it is unknown what he seeks but it was something Alchemax had cured in the 2040s. Lady Spider then calls him, stating that Daemos had gone into a trance-like state. His actions become apparent as Daemos commits suicide so he can be reborn in a new clone body. However, the new Daemos is accosted by the Punisher 2099, who strikes him three times with a titanium baseball bat and then lights the Inheritor up with a plasma gas cannon. Though it does not harm him, the flames melt the floor beneath Daemos' feet, sending him falling into the downtown areas of Nueva York. Punisher then calls Miguel, advising him to get somewhere safe before Daemos comes back. Miguel and Lady Spider take the interdimensional jumping device to the safe zone on Earth-13, only to find a great number of Spiders massacred.

When horrified by the sight of fallen Spiders, Miguel and Lady Spider find Toei Spider-Man's Leopardon and decide to repair it. Unable to return to 2099 with Daemos still there, they transport the remains of the robot to Lady Spider's universe of Earth-803. Miguel tells Lady Spider that Leopardon needs radiation in its arsenal for their next confrontation with the Inheritors due to their weakness. But as they get to work on the robot, Norman Osborn-803 calls his fellow Six Men of Sinistry to take out Lady Spider in revenge for her thwarting their attempted kidnapping of the mayor. Unwilling to waste any time, Miguel leaps into action, clawing at Green Goblin, bluffing him into thinking that he cut his throat, when he deliberately missed, forcing the Goblin to retreat. Miguel gets hit in the back by Electro and is thrown out the window, while Lady Spider takes cover inside Leopardon's head as Electro unleashes a lightning storm at her. The robot then reactivates, causing its right hand and foot to disable Electro and Vulture respectively, before Miguel fires upon Octopus with Kraven's ship, knocking him out cold. As they take Leopardon to rejoin the other Spiders, Lady Spider wonders where Harold Osborn will take her to dinner. Miguel assures her that she will have plenty of time to figure that out after they return from Loomworld and finish the Inheritors once and for all.

Finally arriving to Loomworld on Earth-001 to aid the surviving Spider-Totems, Miguel and Lady Spider present Takuya Yamashiro a newly improved Leopardon. After the Inheritors are defeated and Master Weaver is killed by the Superior Spider-Man, the surviving Spiders need to return to their respective realities one by one. With most of the Spiders sent back to their respective realities thanks to Spider-UK and Earth-616 Peter Parker, only Spider-Man 2099 and Spider-Gwen remain. Suddenly, Superior Spider-Man begins destroying the Web of Life and Destiny with Morlun's dagger, attempting to change his fate but only causing further harm to fabric of realities. Miguel and Gwen Stacy attempt to help the 616 Spiders against Otto, but Peter Parker-616 orders them to return to their respective time lines before the portal maintained by the Great Web closes. Before departing, Miguel reveals to Gwen that in the end Peter takes his body back from Otto and the good guys win.

=== Journey back to 2099 ===
Attempting to return home after the Spider-Verse, Miguel ends up in post-apocalyptic year 2099 of Earth-9200 (from The Incredible Hulk: Future Imperfect storyline). Miguel meets Ash and Sonner and tries to learn what happened in this universe, until he is found by Maestro, who mistakes Miguel for his world's Peter Parker and imprisons him in the same cell as a woman named Strange, and also kills Ash and Sonner, putting their dead bodies on the Hollywood sign. With the help of Strange, Miguel is able to return to the time period he was in before the Spider-Verse. However, he is still unable to return to 2099 and is stuck in 2015 of Earth-616 again.

=== All-New, All-Different Marvel ===
Miguel O'Hara in his new costume. Cover artwork of Spider-Man 2099 vol. 3 #3 (November 2015) by Francesco Mattina.

Following the "Secret Wars" storyline, Miguel is once again stranded in the present.

Following a crimefighting incident gone wrong, Miguel considers retirement. He is approached by Peter Parker, who offers Miguel a job at Parker Industries which Miguel accepts. Miguel resolves to improve the world without being Spider-Man again. However, his use of a time portal he built to investigate the future continues to reveal a devastated 2099. When his lover, Tempest, is killed in a terrorist attack, Miguel is compelled back into action to track down the man responsible: Doctor Chronos, the man who apparently taught robotics to Victor von Doom before his expulsion. During the subsequent fight, Doctor Chronos reveals that he is working for an organization known as "The Fist", before he dies from his injuries. Meanwhile, Roberta Mendez - the Captain America of 2099 - is revealed to have been trapped in the past shortly after the bounty hunter Venture escapes into the present through Miguel's time portal. Despite Miguel and Roberta's best efforts, Venture is retrieved and recruited by the Fist. Miguel comes into conflict with the Inhuman Lash when a Parker Industries scientist named Rhonda Flemming is revealed to be an Inhuman when she undergoes accidental Terrigenesis. Upon hatching, Rhonda's judgement is clouded by her newfound power. After sending Lash back to where he came, she rechristens herself Glorianna and begins attacking civilians. She accidentally impales her girlfriend Jasmine and disappears. Miguel later discovers from Jasmine that Tempest is actually alive, in a coma, having been secreted away by her mother, Loraine Monroe. He distracts Man Mountain Marko, who was hired by Loraine to stand guard at her room, long enough for Parker Industries to covertly relocate Tempest. Spider-Man 2099 confronts Loraine and discovers that she has powers. She confesses to have killed her second husband, because he was stalking Tempest, and that she wanted Tempest away from Miguel for protection. Miguel learns that the body of Doctor Chronos has been moved to Denver, Colorado, where a scientist named Doctor Sonny Frisco is working on a time travel experiment using Glorianna as a guinea pig. When Venture discovers him, Spider-Man fights him until Glorianna sends him back to 2099. He's then captured by that era's Venom and Doctor Octopus. Miguel later wakes up in Alchemax, which is run by that era's Sinister Six. He's freed by Kasey, who takes him to his brother Gabe, where he learns that The Fist is responsible for what happened in the future. The Sinister Six discover that the Goblin is actually Father Jennifer D'Angelo, an undercover ally of Kasey. After receiving a message from the Sinister Six, Miguel and Kasey go to Alchemax to rescue Father Jennifer. Upon escaping, Spider-Man and Father Jennifer arrive at an area where the time door appears, but Jennifer is killed by Doctor Octopus.

During the Civil War II storyline, Roberta goes back to 2099 to find her family, despite Miguel's warnings. The Public Eye attempt to arrest her, until she's rescued by Ravage 2099. In the present, Miguel receives a call from Peter Parker, who tells him of a vision the Inhuman Ulysses Cain had of the future: the death of Roberta Mendez. He goes back to 2099. Roberta learns from Ravage about the Anti-Powers Act, a law outlawing super-powers. Roberta and Ravage are taken to the downtown area by Hawkeye 2099, where they meet the remaining heroes. Spider-Man convinces Doctor Strange 2099 to help him out in exchange for his help in eliminating the A.P.A. Meanwhile, the CEO of Alchemax calls on Power Pack to defeat the heroes. Upon finding Roberta, Strange takes Spider-Man downtown, while Roberta leaves to find her husband upon learning his location. Roberta finds her husband Harry, who claims that she died and that they don't have kids, and gets captured by Power Pack. After Strange reveals that the CEO of Alchemax is J. Jonah Jameson, Spider-Man rallies the heroes to launch an assault on S.H.I.E.L.D. HQ and rescue Roberta. In the process, they discover that "Jameson" and "Power Pack" are actually Skrull impostors. Spider-Man and Roberta then go back to 2016.

While on a flight to Denver, Miguel encounters Elektra in the bathroom, who questioned his connection with the Fist. Upon landing, Elektra reveals to Miguel and Roberta that the Fist is an offshoot of the Hand who broke off from it to pursue bigger plans: the destruction of the United States. Elektra goes to the Fist's HQ after knocking out Miguel and Roberta, who chase after her once they recover. They later help Elektra defeat Doctor Frisco when the base explodes. While being interrogated, Doctor Frisco reveals that the Fist brought the Sinister Six of 2099 to the present and are heading to Chicago to search a Greek witch named Medea. Arriving in Chicago, Spider-Man and Roberta witness people being turned into zombies by a spell cast by Medea. Elektra stabs Medea from behind, killing her and restoring the zombified people. Tempest wakes up from her coma and is told that she is permanently paralyzed. Informed of this, Miguel goes to the hospital only to encounter Man Mountain Marko, who was hired by Tyler Stone to delay Spider-Man 2099 while he took Tempest with him. Upon recovering, Miguel heads back to Parker Industries HQ and finds Dr. Frisco being chased by Electro 2099. After defeating Electro, Miguel takes him to his private lab.

Using a computer simulation, Miguel and Lyla trick Electro 2099 into revealing the date on which the Fist's plans come to fruition: May 15, 2019. Sonny upgrades Miguel's time portal to allow him to travel to 2019, where he puts an end to the Fist's plans with help from that era's Tempest and their son Gabri, who has taken on the mantle of Spider-Man 2099. Tempest tells Miguel that he died while rescuing her from Tyler Stone, but he insists on going through with the rescue attempt for fear that changing the past again will lead to more disasters. Miguel is indeed killed when a post-hypnotic suggestion planted by Stone prompts Tempest to stab him. Due to the hypnosis, Tempest does not realize that she is the one who killed Miguel, thus preventing her from giving him a more specific warning when they met in 2099. However, Miguel is transported to 2099 and resurrected by Doctor Strange 2099, with help from Roberta and Gabri, as well as being informed that they are finally entering a year 2100 at Happy New Year.

== Powers and abilities ==
Miguel O'Hara is a geneticist with advanced knowledge of genetics. Although he has no formal combat training, he develops a fighting style that incorporates his enhanced agility, strength, senses, and intelligence.

After having half of his DNA re-written with the genetic code of a spider, Miguel develops a wide array of powers. He has the proportionate strength, speed, and agility of a spider. His speed allows him to dodge gunfire from a short distance away and move several times faster than a normal human being can. His superhuman agility and dexterity allow him to perform complicated acrobatic and gymnastic maneuvers that would be impossible for even the most highly trained athlete and help him achieve and regain perfect balance even under extraordinary combat situations. Access to these abilities is largely instinctual, due to his re-written genetic code.

Miguel's powers give him increased vitality and resistance to injury. He once suffered a punctured lung, broken ribs and major abrasions, and was still able to make it to a hospital where doctors said only his amazing constitution kept him alive. His metabolism allows him to heal a few times faster than a normal human, although he does not have a superhuman healing factor such as Wolverine.

Unlike the original Spider-Man (Peter Parker), Miguel does not possess an extra-sensory spider-sense that warns him of oncoming threats. Instead, Miguel possess enhanced vision and hearing, which the original Spider-Man does not have. He can see in complete darkness and can accurately perceive and zoom-in on people and objects that are a great distance away. His enhanced vision causes him to be extremely light sensitive, however, requiring that he wear tinted glasses to avoid being blinded in normal lighting conditions, which he passes off as a side effect of the Rapture. The irises of Miguel's eyes became red, although when he uses his enhanced sight to zoom-in on an object that is far away, his eyes often become completely white, with no visible irises or pupils. Thanks to his enhanced vision and reflexes, he can accurately perceive objects in motion that a normal person would see only as a blur. Miguel's hearing is also enhanced, though not to the extent of his vision.

Spinnerets in his forearms enable him to fire an organic adhesive substance from the top of his wrists, usable in a wide variety of ways. Like the original Spider-Man, Spider-Man 2099 can travel at high speeds swinging on "web-lines" when necessary, and he can use his webbing to ensnare enemies. Over time, this webbing loses its tensile strength and can be removed. Pressure applied to his forearms has occasionally caused him to release webbing unintentionally.

Although the original Spider-Man is able to have any part of his body (such as his back) adhere to surfaces through unknown and invisible means, Miguel can only cling to surfaces with his hands and feet due to angled talons protruding from his fingers and toes. These talons are not retractable but can fold down when Miguel concentrates and do so automatically when he touches his own skin so that he does not injure himself. Though only approximately an inch in length, Miguel O'Hara's talons are capable of easily slicing through flesh and plastic. They can even rend metal armor.

Miguel possesses venom glands and pronounced, pointed canine teeth. When he bites a foe, he can release a toxin that temporarily paralyzes his enemy. While the exact makeup of his venom has never been discussed, it seems powerful enough to affect such foes as Thanos and it differs from real spider venom in that it does not seem to act as a digestive agent. Miguel also cannot retract his fangs and so has had to learn how to speak in a way that does not reveal his teeth. On occasion, this has caused others to accuse him of mumbling.

=== Paraphernalia ===
Spider-Man 2099's costume is made from Unstable Molecule Fabric or "UMF." Originally invented by Reed Richards of the Fantastic Four, this fabric was made to be indestructible and was designed to interact with super-powers without hampering them. Miguel uses his talons through the UMF gloves and boots without tearing the cloth. The UMF does not dull the strength or sharpness of his talons in the process. The UMF costume has also offered Spider-Man 2099 limited protection from energy weapons, as the energy blasts could not penetrate it. However, this did not prevent Miguel from suffering the impact of the blasts, and he was still seriously injured. Likewise, if Miguel fell from a great height, the UMF would not protect him from the impact of landing, it simply would not tear in the process.

Spider-Man 2099 has a small, web-like airfoil attached to the back of his costume. The material for the air foil was obtained from a Thorite's hang-glider and is made from a material called "Lyte Byte" which is specially made to capture and direct air currents and gives off a low level of anti-gravity particles. This allows Spider-Man 2099 limited gliding abilities, valuable since the New York City of 2099 has massive skyscrapers that are often too far away for him to fire a web-line for travel. The Lyte Byte material also allows him to shift direction while in free fall and is very good at slowing down his descent, allowing him to fall from great distances without reaching terminal velocity. However, this does not grant Spider-Man 2099 actual flight. By the second volume of Spider-Man 2099 series, however, he had added anti-gravity material to the back of his costume that enables him to fly.

While in costume, Miguel often reinforces his mask with webbing so that enemies cannot remove it if he is captured or disabled in some way, provided he is not held for long enough for his webbing to degrade. He uses his talons to cut the webbing off when he removes his costume.

== Other versions ==
=== 2998 AD ===
In The Amazing Spider-Man #439, the issue takes place 1,000 years (2998, based on the release date of the issue) in the future. Two archaeologists stumble across relics belonging to Spider-Man (such as his webshooters). They speculate on his career, and discuss the other heroes who were inspired by him, such as Spider-Girl, Spider-Man 2099, and Spider-Man 2211.

=== Destiny War ===
Another version of Spider-Man 2099 is one of the alternative Avengers seen briefly during the Destiny War in Avengers Forever #12. During the Spider-Verse storyline, the Destiny War version of Spider-Man 2099 is killed by Morlun.

=== Earth-2099 ===
In the unified Marvel 2099 reality of Earth-2099, Miguel O'Hara is a scientist at Alchemax who has hallucinations of Earth-928 and Earth-23291. After leaving Alchemax and being saved by his brother Gabriel, he encounters a time-displaced version of himself. Miguel is reluctant to become Spider-Man until Gabriel's apartment is detonated by Alchemax. He became Spider-Man while infusing himself with Spider-Man's DNA.

During the "End of the Spider-Verse" storyline, Miguel was among those who were bitten by Shathra's wasps and fell under her control. He is freed from Shathra's control when Shathra was defeated. Spider-Man 2099, Madame Web, and Lady Araña begin to establish the Spider-Society.

=== Exiles ===
Spider-Man 2099 with the Exiles

The appearance of Proteus in the 2099 era before Doom 2099 comes into power causes a divergence from the original Marvel 2099, creating a new parallel reality. This new timeline, where Miguel is unmasked and leaves his world before Doom takes power, is identified as Earth-6375.

After battling the Exiles, a team of heroes from parallel worlds who attempt to fix damaged realities, the villain Proteus possesses the body of John "Net Prophet" Tensen and escapes to the parallel Earth designated Earth-928 via Jordan Boone's Virtual Unreality portal (mirroring the Net Prophet's first arrival into 2099). This is the world of the Marvel 2099 future, though Proteus arrives at a time before Doom took over leadership of the United States.

Proteus then possesses the Hulk of that era. Spider-Man 2099 joins forces with the Exiles to stop him. Proteus, being too strong for his opponent, unmasks Miguel O'Hara before the public. Spider-Man 2099 then convinces Proteus that coming to his reality was a mistake and that he should move on. Feeling guilty that he has inflicted the crazed villain onto a parallel Earth, and now afraid of being hunted down since his identity has been exposed, Spider-Man 2099 joins the Exiles in their quest to stop Proteus and leaves his world.

After Proteus is defeated, Spider-Man 2099 remains with the Exiles to help them continue to fix damaged realities. After a couple more adventures, the Exiles are scattered across the multiverse and Miguel O'Hara winds up on a parallel world where he is found by a red-haired woman living on the beach, later revealed to be that world's Mary Jane Watson. After an unspecified amount of time, the woman and Miguel fall in love and he remains on that world. The Exiles locate Miguel but decide to leave him in the parallel world, deciding at least one of them should be allowed a happy, normal life.

Years later, he and Mary Jane are still together when the attacks of Morlun during the Spider-Verse storyline are felt. Miguel learned about Morlun during Miguel's tenure with the Exiles, and senses Morlun is out there killing spiders. He gathers some of the Exiles' old equipment and prepares to flee to Earth-616, where Morlun was once killed. However, just as Miguel and Mary Jane are about to make the jump, Morlun arrives and kills that Miguel in front of the Miguel from the original timeline stranded in the present. Morlun disappears and the portal closes, leaving the Exiles' Miguel dead and the 616 Miguel desperate to find Peter Parker.

=== Secret Wars ===
During the Secret Wars storyline, the Battleworld domain of 2099 is where Alchemax reigns supreme. However, this is not the same reality as Earth-928 as Miguel is the legitimate son of Tyler Stone and goes by his birth name Miguel Stone with 2099 being made from the remnants of Earth-23291. He is the morally dubious head of Alchemax which he took over from his handicapped father. Miguel presides over the Alchemax-sponsored Avengers consisting of Hercules and future versions of Iron Man (Sonny Frisco), Captain America (Roberta Mendez), Black Widow (Tania), and Hawkeye (Max). When the teams comes into conflict with Defenders consisting of Hulk 2099, Silver Surfer, Valkyrie, Strange, and Roman the Sub-Mariner, Miguel offers them to go legitimate and work for Alchemax. The moment their leader Strange refuses, he orders the entire team detained at any cost. The teams though end up having to work together in the end when Martin Hargood, the descendant of Baron Mordo breaks into Alchemax and frees the Dweller-in-Darkness to wreak havoc. Miguel learned that his father was the one who called the hit on Captain America and threw him out the window. The Avengers and the Defenders succeeded in stopping Mordo and re-banishing the Dweller-in-Darkness. Miguel decides to let the Defenders keep operating as good guys in an act of gratitude towards them.

=== Timestorm 2009–2099 ===
In the 2009 miniseries Timestorm 2009–2099, O'Hara is younger than in his original version. His father is a scientist at Alchemax and Miguel himself is a high school student attending the Pym Academy. Miguel lives with his father with no siblings, as opposed to the original incarnation in which he lives with his mother and brother Gabriel.

Miguel received his powers in an accident caused by the Timestorm. At the time, he was attending a class on biological re-engineering in which he and his classmates were altering the genetic code of various bugs. When the Timestorm happened, his DNA was mixed with that of the spider he was working on. His powers are extremely similar to those of Peter Parker, including a spider-sense, with the exception of Miguel's organic webbing, which is shot from the top of his hand. As opposed to the original incarnation of Miguel O'Hara, the Timestorm version does not appear to have razor sharp "talons" on his hands and feet.

After gaining his powers, he creates his Spider-Man costume in a 3D printer and helps a time-lost Peter Parker battle Scorpion 2099 (Kron Stone, who was caught in the same accident as Miguel). The original Spider-Man advises him not to be a hero as it is too dangerous, and he instead uses his powers in a fighting arena against the Atlantean Human Torch.

During the 2014 "Spider-Verse" storyline, the Timestorm version of Spider-Man 2099 was killed by Morlun.

=== Warp Worlds ===
During the events of "Infinity Wars", Gamora uses the Infinity Stones to fold the universe in half, resulting in the creation of Warp World, where characters and histories were merged. Spider-Man 2099 merged with Ravage 2099 to become Arachknight 2099 (who based himself on the hero Arachknight, an amalgamation of Spider-Man and Moon Knight). In this world, Miguel Ravage accessed primal arachnid DNA through a gene-surgery accident and fights using the "spider-beast" within.

=== What The--?! ===
Piguel O'Malley / Spider-Ham 15.88, a funny animal version of Spider-Man 2099 from Earth-8311, appears in What The--?!, #26.

== In other media ==
=== Television ===
- A Spider-Man 2099 animated series was considered in 1999, but was not developed further due to the similar futuristic series Batman Beyond premiering earlier that year. Instead, creator Will Meugniot went ahead with Spider-Man Unlimited (1999).
- Spider-Man 2099 appears in the Ultimate Spider-Man four-part episode "The Spider-Verse", voiced by Freddy Rodriguez. This version possesses a "spider-sense" like the original Spider-Man and is animated in CGI while in his universe as opposed to the series' usual hand-drawn animation until he arrives in the "prime" dimension.

=== Film ===
- Spider-Man 2099 appears in the Spider-Verse trilogy, voiced by Oscar Isaac.
  - He first appears in the post-credits scene of Spider-Man: Into the Spider-Verse, in which he and his A.I. Lyla learn about the film's events while building a watch that allows safe dimensional travel. He tests it by to traveling to Earth-67, but gets into an argument with its Spider-Man.
  - Spider-Man 2099 appears in Spider-Man: Across the Spider-Verse. As of this film, he has formed the "Spider-Society" to protect the multiverse and comes into conflict with Miles Morales due to his personal belief that all Spider-People must experience personal losses to maintain the stability of the multiverse.

=== Video games ===
- Spider-Man 2099 was going to appear as a playable character in Marvel 2099: One Nation Under Doom before the game was cancelled mid-development.
- Spider-Man 2099 appears as a playable character in Marvel Super Hero Squad.
- Spider-Man 2099 appears as a playable character in Marvel Super Hero Squad Online, voiced by Yuri Lowenthal.
- Spider-Man 2099 appears as a playable character in Spider-Man: Shattered Dimensions, voiced by Dan Gilvezan. Madame Web grants him a spider-sense so he can reclaim fragments of the Tablet of Order and Chaos from his universe's versions of the Hobgoblin, the Scorpion, and Doctor Octopus before joining forces with three of his alternate counterparts to defeat Mysterio after he acquires the reassembled Tablet.
- Spider-Man 2099 appears as a playable character in Spider-Man: Edge of Time, voiced by Christopher Daniel Barnes.
- Spider-Man 2099, in both his black and white suits, as well as Spider-Ham 2099, both appear as playable characters in Spider-Man Unlimited (2014).
- Spider-Man 2099 appears as a playable character in Marvel: Future Fight.
- Spider-Man 2099 appears as a playable character in Lego Marvel Super Heroes 2.
- Spider-Man 2099's black and white suits appear as alternate costumes for the titular character of Spider-Man (2018).
- Spider-Man 2099's black suit appears as an alternate costume for Peter Parker / Spider-Man in Spider-Man 2.
- Spider-Man 2099 appears as a skin in Fortnite Battle Royale.

== Collected editions ==
=== Volume 1 (1992-1996) ===
#	Title	Material collected	Format	Pages	Released	ISBN
1	Spider-Man 2099 Vol. 1	Spider-Man 2099 (vol. 1) #1–10	TPB	240	6 May 2009	978-0785139645
2	Spider-Man 2099 Vol. 2	Spider-Man 2099 (vol. 1) #11–14, Annual #1, and material from 2099 Unlimited #1–3	TPB	240	8 Oct 2013	978-0785185376
3	Spider-Man 2099 Vol. 3	Spider-Man 2099 (vol. 1) #15–22, Ravage 2099 #15, X-Men 2099 #5, Doom 2099 #14, Punisher 2099 #13	TPB	296	17 Feb 2015	978-0785193029
4	Spider-Man 2099 Vol. 4	Spider-Man 2099 (vol. 1) #23–33, material from 2099 Unlimited #8	TPB	286	2 May 2017	978-1302904746
	Spider-Man 2099 vs. Venom 2099	Spider-Man 2099 (vol. 1) #34–38, Spider-Man 2099 Special, Spider-Man 2099 Meets Spider-Man, material from 2099 Unlimited #9–10	TPB	280	30 Apr 2019	978-1302916213
1	Spider-Man 2099 Omnibus Vol. 1	Spider-Man 2099 (vol. 1) #1–46, Ravage 2099 #15, X-Men 2099 #5, Doom 2099 #14, Punisher 2099 #13, Spider-Man 2099 Annual #1, Spider-Man 2099 Meets Spider-Man, Spider-Man 2099 Special	Omnibus	1,384	25 Oct 2022	Jim Fern cover: 978-1302947798
1	Spider-Man 2099 Omnibus Vol. 1	Spider-Man 2099 (vol. 1) #1–46, Ravage 2099 #15, X-Men 2099 #5, Doom 2099 #14, Punisher 2099 #13, Spider-Man 2099 Annual #1, Spider-Man 2099 Meets Spider-Man, Spider-Man 2099 Special	Omnibus	1,384	25 Oct 2022	Rick Leonardi DM cover: 978-1302947804

=== Volume 2 (2014-2015) ===
#	Title	Material collected	Format	Pages	Released	ISBN
1	Spider-Man 2099 Vol. 1: Out Of Time	Spider-Man 2099 (vol. 2) #1–5, and material from Amazing Spider-Man (vol. 3) #1	TPB	120	17 Feb 2015	978-0785190790
	Spider-Verse	The Amazing Spider-Man (vol. 3) #7–15, Superior Spider-Man #32–33, Free Comic Book Day: Guardians of the Galaxy #1 (five-page Spider-Man story), Spider-Verse (vol. 2) #1–2, Spider-Verse Team-Up #1–3, Scarlet Spiders #1–3, Spider-Woman (vol. 5) #1–4, Spider-Man 2099 (vol. 2) #6–8	OHC	648	12 May 2015	978-0785190356
	Spider-Verse	The Amazing Spider-Man (vol. 3) #7–15, Superior Spider-Man #32–33, Free Comic Book Day: Guardians of the Galaxy #1 (five-page Spider-Man story), Spider-Verse (vol. 2) #1–2, Spider-Verse Team-Up #1–3, Scarlet Spiders #1–3, Spider-Woman (vol. 5) #1–4, Spider-Man 2099 (vol. 2) #6–8	TPB	648	10 Mar 2016	978-0785190363
2	Spider-Man 2099 Vol. 2: Spider-Verse	Spider-Man 2099 (vol. 2) #6–12	TPB	160	28 Jul 2015	978-0785190806
	Spider-Man 2099 Omnibus	Spider-Man 2099 (vol. 2) #1–12	TPB Omnibus	264	1 Sep 2022	978-1804910399

=== Volume 3 (2015-2017) ===
Despite a new volume number, the trade paperback numbering continues from before.

#	Title	Material collected	Format	Pages	Released	ISBN
3	Spider-Man 2099 Vol. 3: Smack To The Future	Spider-Man 2099 (vol. 3) #1–5, material from Amazing Spider-Man (vol. 4) #1	TPB	120	10 May 2016	978-0785199632
4	Spider-Man 2099 Vol. 4: Gods And Women	Spider-Man 2099 (vol. 3) #6–10	TPB	112	9 Aug 2016	978-0785199649
5	Spider-Man 2099 Vol. 5: Civil War II	Spider-Man 2099 (vol. 3) #11–16	TPB	136	31 Jan 2017	978-1302902810
6	Spider-Man 2099 Vol. 6: Apocalypse Soon	Spider-Man 2099 (vol. 3) #17–21	TPB	112	12 Sep 2017	978-1302902827
7	Spider-Man 2099 Vol. 7: Back To The Future, Shock!	Spider-Man 2099 (vol. 3) #22–25, Spider-Man 2099 Meets Spider-Man	TPB	112	10 Oct 2017	978-1302905200
2	Spider-Man 2099 Omnibus Vol. 2	Spider-Man 2099 (vol. 2) #1-12; Spider-Man 2099 (vol. 3) #1-25; Captain Marvel (1999) #27-30; Superior Spider-Man (vol. 1) 17-19; Secret Wars 2099 #1-5; material from 2099 Unlimited (1993) #1-3, #8-10; Amazing Spider-Man (vol. 3) #1; Amazing Spider-Man (vol. 4) #1	Omnibus	1,256	2 Apr 2024	Simon Bianchi cover: 978-1302953836
2	Spider-Man 2099 Omnibus Vol. 2	Spider-Man 2099 (vol. 2) #1-12; Spider-Man 2099 (vol. 3) #1-25; Captain Marvel (1999) #27-30; Superior Spider-Man (vol. 1) 17-19; Secret Wars 2099 #1-5; material from 2099 Unlimited (1993) #1-3, #8-10; Amazing Spider-Man (vol. 3) #1; Amazing Spider-Man (vol. 4) #1	Omnibus	1,256	2 Apr 2024	Pasqual Ferry DM cover: 978-1302953843

=== Miniseries ===
#	Title	Material collected	Format	Pages	Released	ISBN
	Timestorm 2009/2099	Timestorm 2009/2099: Spider-Man, Timestorm 2009/2099 #1-4, Timestorm 2009/2099: X-Men	HC	144	18 Nov 2009	978-0785139225
	Amazing Spider-Man 2099 Companion	Spider-Man 2099 (vol. 4) #1, 2099 Alpha #1, Conan 2099 #1, Doom 2099 (vol. 2) #1, Fantastic Four 2099 (vol. 2) #1, Ghost Rider 2099 (vol. 2) #1, The Punisher 2099 (vol. 3) #1, Venom 2099 #1, 2099 Omega #1	TPB	296	4 Aug 2020	978-1302924928
	Spider-Man 2099: Exodus	Spider-Man 2099: Alpha #1, Spider-Man 2099: Omega #1, Spider-Man 2099: Exodus #1-5	TPB	180	3 Jan 2023	978-1804910825
	Spider-Man 2099: Dark Genesis	Spider-Man 2099: Dark Genesis #1-5	TPB	112	5 Sep 2023	978-1302952235
	Miguel O'Hara - Spider-Man: 2099	Miguel O'Hara - Spider-Man: 2099 #1-5	TPB	120	23 Jul 2023	978-1302958022
	Symbiote Spider-Man 2099	Symbiote Spider-Man 2099 #1-5	TPB	120	7 Jan 2025	978-1302949969

== See also ==
- Spider-Man (Miles Morales) – Spider-Man of African-American and Latino descent
- Anya Corazon – Latina superheroine with spider-powers
