= Lorraine Garland =

American folk musician

Lorraine Garland (born 15 February 1963) is a folk musician from Minneapolis, Minnesota. She sang and played fiddle with science fiction author Emma Bull in folk duo The Flash Girls, with the band Folk UnderGround, and in the goth / folk / rock / traditional Celtic duo Lorraine a' Malena with Malena Teves, which whom she also contributed to Chris Ewen's The Hidden Variable. She is currently one half of the folk / rock / Celtic duo Paul and Lorraine with Paul Score.

Garland is the former personal assistant to writer Neil Gaiman, for whom she worked for 20 years.
