= Folk UnderGround =

Folk UnderGround is a musical group from Minneapolis, Minnesota, USA, who blend traditional music and new songs with dark and darkly comic themes. The members include Lorraine Garland (violin and vocals), Trevor Hartman (drums, accordion, and vocals), and Paul Score (guitar and vocals).

The band formed in the summer of 2002 when guitarist Paul Score and Trevor Hartman began playing tunes from Garland's old band, The Flash Girls. "Before Long," explained Score in one interview, "Lorraine was telling us how to play them correctly, and it went to the wee hours of the morning, and we just had a blast".

The group has two albums, Buried Things, featuring new songs written by Neil Gaiman and Jane Yolen (among others), along with a selection of traditional songs. The second, Get Y'er Hands Off 'Me Booty!, is a live album of (mostly) traditional songs.

Though they have since broken up, the group used to play as the opening act for "Puke and Snot" (a comedy duo) at the Minnesota Renaissance Fair.
