= Orpheus (DC Comics) =

- Orpheus as depicted in Batman: Orpheus Rising #2 (November 2001). Art by Dwayne Turner.

Publication information
- Publisher: DC Comics
- First appearance: Batman: Orpheus Rising #1 (October 2001)
- Created by: Alex Simmons (writer); Dwayne Turner (artist)

In-story information
- Alter ego: Gavin King
- Team affiliations: Hill Street Gang; Batman Family
- Abilities: Expert martial artist; Camouflage in shadows (via suit)

Orpheus is a fictional character appearing in American comic books published by DC Comics. He first appears in Batman: Orpheus Rising (October 2001), and was created by Alex Simmons and Dwayne Turner.

== Fictional character biography ==
Gavin King grew up in Gotham dreaming of becoming a professional dancer and singer. His ambitions made him a target for local bullies, and after one too many beatings, King began studying the martial arts, excelling at them from the start. His father, a TV sports producer, and his mother, a former professional dancer, were very supportive—as long as he completed his college education.

Having reached his goal in his late teens, King toured the world as part of a famous dance troupe, but his travels exposed him to a world full of famine, poverty, violence, prejudice and lack of faith. King tried to help these unfortunates on more than one occasion, nearly getting himself killed in the process. Eventually, he was recruited by a secret organization dedicated to correcting some of the world's problems. Getting special training and technological support in the form of a stealth-circuitry-enhanced costume, King became Orpheus – a force against evil and ignorance.

Reasoning that Gotham City needed a black hero, Orpheus returned to his native city as a successful entertainment producer as well as a crimefighter. Orpheus' first cases in led him into contact with Batman, who was not fond of the debut of another inexperienced vigilante in Gotham, but recognized Orpheus as a competent force for good.

=== War Games ===
During the 'War Games' story arc, Spoiler, desperate to prove herself, took one of Batman's contingency plans and set it into action. The plan was to get all of Gotham's crime lords under the control of Orpheus, an agent of Batman, and therefore under the control of Batman himself. The plan failed because Spoiler was unaware that the man who was set to meet with the crime lords, Matches Malone, was really just one of Batman's disguises. When "Matches Malone" did not show the meeting quickly broke out into a fight, leaving many dead. This quickly erupted into a brutal gang war on the streets of Gotham.

When Spoiler comes to tell Orpheus what he must do to reclaim the situation, Black Mask appeared from the shadows and cut Orpheus's throat before torturing Stephanie to learn the extent of the plans so that he can instead appear inside Orpheus's stealth suit.

== Bibliography ==
- Batman: Orpheus Rising #1-5
- Nightwing vol. 2 #66 (April 2002) [Bruce Wayne: Murderer? Part Nine] "The Unusual Suspects"
- Batman: Family #3 (January 2003) "P.O.V."
- Batman: Family #8 (February 2003) "Blackout"
- Detective Comics #794-797
- Batman: The 12-Cent Adventure #1 (October 2004): "War Games Prelude: No Help"
- Batman: Legends of the Dark Knight #182 (October 2004) "War Games Act 1, Part 2: Behind Enemy Lines"
