= Dwayne Turner =

American comic book artist

- Born: New York City, U.S.
- Area: Artist
- Notable works: Sovereign Seven; Curse of the Spawn

Dwayne Turner is an American comic book artist and illustrator in the film and video game industry.

== Biography ==
Turner was born in Brooklyn.

He began his professional career in the late 1980s while still in college at the School of Visual Arts.

He got his start at Marvel Comics on such titles as Avengers Spotlight and Transformers. For DC, he penciled the Power of the Atom limited series in 1988. Teaming up with writer Marcus McLaurin and inker Chris Ivy, Turner penciled the bulk of the first 12 issues of Marvel's Cage title in 1992–1993. In 1995, he co-created the title Sovereign Seven for DC Comics with writer Chris Claremont.

In 1992, he co-created the character James Lucas for Marvel Comics with writer Marcus McLaurin. In 1993, he co-created Hulk 2099 for Marvel Comics with writer Gerard Jones. In 2001 he co-created the character Orpheus also for DC Comics with writer Alex Simmons. In 2003, he co-created the character Traci Thirteen for DC Comics with writer Joe Kelly.

Turner worked on a number of Todd McFarlane's Spawn titles, with a long run on the spin-off series Curse of the Spawn from 1996 to 1999. He was the penciller on volume 2 of Wildstorm's The Authority in 2003–2004.

Leaving the comics industry in 2006, Turner has worked in the video game and motion picture fields. As a storyboard illustrator, his feature film credits include Tron: Legacy, Oblivion, and The Jungle Book. His video game work includes the Halo franchise, the God of War franchise, and Gears of War.

== Bibliography ==
=== Continuity Comics ===
- (with Peter Stone) Ms. Mystic #5–6 (1990)

=== DC Comics ===
- (with Joe Kelly) "Lost Hearts, Part 2: Heartbroken," Adventures of Superman #611 (2003)
- (with Alex Simmons) Batman: Orpheus Rising #1–5 (2001–2002)
- (with Robbie Morrison) The Authority vol. 2, #1–4, 6–13 (WildStorm, 2003–2004)
- (with Roger Stern) Power of the Atom #1–5 (1988)
- (with Chris Claremont) Sovereign Seven #1–12, 15–16 (1995–1996)
- (with Joe Kelly) Superman #189 (February 2003)
- (with Greg Rucka) "One or the Other," Superman: Lex 2000 anthology, (Nov. 2000)

=== Image Comics ===
- (with Charles Holland) Butcher Knight #1–4 (Top Cow Productions, 2000–2001)
- (with Alan McElroy) Curse of the Spawn #1–23, 26 (1996–1999)
- (with Todd McFarlane) Spawn #76–77 (1998)
- (with Paul Jenkins and Chance Wolf) Spawn: The Undead #1–9 (June 1999–February 2000)

=== Marvel Comics ===
- (with Marcus McLaurin and Chris Ivy) Cage #1–8, 10, 12 (1992–1993)
- (with Gerard Jones) 2099 Unlimited #1–2 (September 1993)
- (with Dwayne McDuffie and Chris Ivy) Avengers Spotlight #26–29 (1989–1990)
- (with Don McGregor) Black Panther: Panther's Prey #1–4 (Sept. 1990–March 1991)
- (with Bobbie Chase & Mike Gustovich) "The Maiden Phoenix," Marvel Comics Presents #15 (March 1989)
- (with Marie Javins & Marcus McLaurin and Chris Ivy) "Life During Wartime," Marvel Comics Presents #82–87 (1991)
- The Transformers #68 (July 1990)
- (with Larry Hama) Wolverine #69–73 (May–Sept. 1993)

Preceded by N/A	Cage penciller 1992–1993	Succeeded by Scott Benefiel
Preceded by Mark Texeira	Wolverine penciller 1993	Succeeded by Jim Fern
Preceded by N/A	Sovereign Seven penciller 1995–1996	Succeeded by Ron Lim
Preceded by N/A	Curse of the Spawn penciller 1996–1999	Succeeded by Clayton Crain
Preceded by José Delbo	The Transformers artist 1990	Succeeded by Andrew Wildman
