= List of programs broadcast by Smile (TV network) =

Smile (formerly known as "Smile of a Child" until 2017) was an American Christian-based children's TV network owned by TBN. Although primarily a Christian-based network, Smile acquired some secular programming from outside producers and the public domain, such as Lassie and The Big Garage, as well as acquiring the U.S. rights to Canadian series such as Mickey's Farm. It also aired family-oriented films with religious/inspirational themes on Saturday afternoons and Sunday evenings. The network ran for nearly 20 years from December 24, 2005, until its closure on January 12, 2025.

== Former programming ==
All programs listed were designated as E/I by Smile, fulfilling the Federal Communications Commission's educational programming requirements.

=== Original programming ===
| Title | Premiere date | End date | Source(s) |
|---|---|---|---|
| Colby's Clubhouse | December 24, 2005 | January 12, 2025 | (Note: This show aired on TBN from 1995 to December 29, 2006, and again from 2015 to 2017.) |
| Mary Rice Hopkins and Puppets with a Heart | 2008 | January 12, 2025 | (Note: This show aired on TBN from 2010 to March 30, 2019.) |
| iShine KNECT | 2009 | 2021 | |
| VeggieTales | November 3, 2012 | January 12, 2025 | (Note: This show aired on TBN since November 3, 2012.) |
| 3-2-1 Penguins! | November 3, 2012 | 2018 | (Note: This show aired on TBN from November 3, 2012 to 2017.) |

=== Programming from Discovery Kids ===
| Title | Premiere date | End date | Source(s) |
|---|---|---|---|
| Meteor and the Mighty Monster Trucks (Note: The Christian version was branded as Monster Truck Adventures.) | October 2, 2012 | 2020 | (Note: This show aired on TBN from November 3, 2012 to March 30, 2019.) |

=== Programming from PBS Kids ===
| Title | Premiere date | End date | Source(s) |
|---|---|---|---|
| The Dooley and Pals Show | December 26, 2005 | June 25, 2023 | (Note: This show aired on TBN from 2004 to 2013.) |
| The Zula Patrol | April 4, 2015 | March 2020 | |
| Raggs | July 2, 2015 | June 30, 2020 | |
| Curiosity Quest | 2017 | 2021 | |
| Jay Jay the Jet Plane | November 1, 2021 | January 12, 2025 | |

=== Acquired programming ===
| Title | Premiere date | End date | Source(s) |
|---|---|---|---|
| The Reppies | December 24, 2005 | December 30, 2021 | |
| Becky's Barn | December 26, 2005 | February 28, 2023 | (Note: This show aired on TBN from September 5, 1992 to 1997.) |
| Cherub Wings | December 26, 2005 | December 31, 2021 | |
| Davey and Goliath | December 26, 2005 | September 29, 2018 | (Note: This show aired on TBN from March 1, 1986 to 1994, and 2002 to 2006.) |
| The Flying House | December 26, 2005 | December 31, 2021 | (Note: This show aired on TBN from November 4, 1989 to 2006.) |
| Curtain Climbing Kids Club | December 26, 2005 | December 31, 2021 | (Note: This show aired on TBN from May 22, 1993 to March 30, 2002.) |
| The Filling Station | December 26, 2005 | February 28, 2023 | (Note: This show aired on TBN from June 4, 1988 to 1996.) |
| Gospel Bill | December 26, 2005 | February 28, 2023 | (Note: This show aired on TBN from October 1, 1984 to 2005.) |
| Just the Facts | December 26, 2005 | 2008 | |
| The Knock Knock Show | December 26, 2005 | February 28, 2023 | (Note: This show aired on TBN from April 6, 2002 to September 30, 2006.) |
| Mr. Henry's Wild & Wacky World | December 26, 2005 | 2009 | |
| Quigley's Village | December 26, 2005 | 2023 | (Note: This show aired on TBN from June 30, 1990 to 2000.) |
| Superbook (1981) | December 26, 2005 | 2022 | (Note: This show aired on TBN from November 4, 1989 to 2004.) |
| Joy Junction | December 26, 2005 | August 1, 2012 | (Note: This show aired on TBN from 1982 to 2005.) |
| Kids Like You | December 26, 2005 | February 28, 2023 | |
| Circle Square | December 26, 2005 | 2009 | (Note: This show aired on TBN from September 13, 1986 to 1998, and 2000 to 2006.) |
| Bibleman | 2005 | 2010 | |
| Faithville | 2005 | 2022 | |
| Janice's Attic | 2005 | 2007 | |
| Kids Against Crime | 2005 | 2010 | |
| Kingdom Adventure | 2005 | 2007 | |
| Maralee Dawn and Friends | 2005 | 2016 | |
| McGee and Me! | 2005 | 2010 | |
| Miss Charity's Diner | 2005 | 2022 | |
| Pahappahooey Island | 2005 | January 12, 2025 | |
| Retro News: A Blast from the Past | 2005 | January 10, 2025 | |
| The Swamp Critters of Lost Lagoon | 2005 | 2021 | |
| Virtual Memory | 2005 | 2006 | |
| WWJDtv with Gina Thompson | 2005 | 2006 | |
| Gina D's Kids Club | October 7, 2006 | 2022 | (Note: This show aired on TBN from October 7, 2006 to March 30, 2019.) |
| Nanna's Cottage | October 7, 2006 | January 12, 2025 | (Note: This show aired on TBN from October 7, 2006 to 2007.) |
| BJ's Teddy Bear Club and Bible Stories | 2006 | October 31, 2020 | (Note: This show aired on TBN from 2006 to 2013.) |
| Children's Heroes of the Bible | 2006 | 2020 | |
| Fun Food Adventures | 2006 | 2016 | |
| The Funny Company | 2006 | May 31, 2016 | |
| ImagineLand | 2006 | 2012 | |
| Puppet Parade | 2006 | December 31, 2021 | |
| My Bedbugs | April 1, 2007 | 2009 | (Note: This show aired on TBN from 2007 to 2009.) |
| Animal Action with Eddie & Greg | 2007 | 2016 | |
| Another Sommertime Adventure | 2007 | 2021 | |
| Booples! | 2007 | 2009 | |
| The Boulder Buddies | 2007 | 2015 | |
| Creation's Creatures | 2007 | December 31, 2021 | |
| Dr. Wonder's Workshop | 2007 | January 12, 2025 | |
| Friends and Heroes | 2007 | January 10, 2025 | |
| Jacob's Ladder | 2007 | 2017 | |
| Life at the Pond | 2007 | 2014 | |
| Little Buds | 2007 | 2017 | |
| Safari Tracks | 2007 | 2014 | |
| Sing Along with Gina D | 2007 | 2022 | |
| Storytime Circus Theater | 2007 | 2008 | |
| Time with Dizzy | 2007 | 2011 | |
| Wild's Life | 2007 | 2015 | |
| The Wumblers | September 1, 2007 | 2010 | |
| God Rocks!/God Rocks Bibletoons | 2007 | October 25, 2013 | |
| Now See This | January 1, 2008 | January 2013 | |
| Arnie's Shack | February 2008 | January 11, 2025 | |
| Auto-B-Good | 2008 | January 31, 2019 | |
| The Big Garage | 2008 | 2019 | |
| Aqua Kids Adventures | 2008 | 2021 | |
| Ben Ketting and the Children of Light | 2008 | 2020 | |
| Bugtime Adventures | 2008 | 2020 | |
| The Charlie Church Mouse Show | 2008 | February 28, 2023 | |
| Chubby Cubbies | 2008 | 2021 | |
| D.A.R.E. Safety Tips Starring Retro Bill | 2008 | 2018 | |
| Ewe Know | 2008 | 2017 | |
| Going Wild | 2008 | 2012 | |
| Grandfather Reads | 2008 | 2018 | |
| His Kids | 2008 | 2009 | |
| OKTV | 2008 | 2013 | |
| Professor Bounce's Kid Fit | 2008 | 2021 | |
| ReFURbished Tails | 2008 | 2017 | |
| St. Bear's Dolls Hospital | 2008 | 2017 | |
| The Story Keepers | 2008 | 2018 | |
| The Upstairs Downstairs Bears | 2008 | 2017 | |
| Vipo: Adventures of the Flying Dog | 2008 | 2013 | |
| The World of Jonathan Singh | 2008 | December 31, 2021 | |
| Sarah's Stories | 2008 | January 12, 2025 | |
| Tales of Little Women | August 3, 2009 | July 31, 2017 | |
| Pit Pony | November 2009 | 2012 | |
| Animal Atlas | 2009 | 2018 | |
| Deputy Dingle | 2009 | 2015 | |
| Gerbert | 2009 | October 31, 2019 | |
| The Huggabug Club | 2009 | May 31, 2016 | |
| NIV Kids Club Music Videos | 2009 | 2022 | |
| The Adventures of Carlos Caterpillar | 2010 | September 30, 2023 | (Note: This show aired on TBN from 2010 to 2013.) |
| The Adventures of Donkey Ollie | 2010 | December 30, 2021 | |
| BB's Bedtime Stories | 2010 | January 11, 2025 | |
| Hermie and Friends | 2010 | January 12, 2025 | (Note: This show aired on TBN from 2010 to 2020.) |
| The Lad's TV | 2010 | 2017 | |
| Mike's Inspiration Station | 2010 | January 12, 2025 | |
| Mustard Pancakes | 2010 | January 12, 2025 | |
| Paws & Tales | 2010 | January 12, 2025 | (Note: This show aired on TBN from 2010 to 2017.) |
| PraiseMoves Kids | 2010 | 2012 | |
| Super Simple Science Stuff | 2010 | January 11, 2025 | |
| The Swiss Family Robinson | 2010 | 2017 | |
| Timbuktoons | 2010 | 2016 | |
| Adventures in Booga Booga Land | February 4, 2011 | January 10, 2025 | |
| Young America Outdoors | April 2011 | 2015 | |
| Animated Stories from the Bible | July 2011 | 2018 | |
| Come On Over | July 2011 | January 12, 2025 | |
| Cowboy Dan's Frontier | October 4, 2011 | 2020 | |
| The Bedbug Bible Gang | November 1, 2011 | 2021 | |
| Animated Hero Classics | 2011 | 2018 | |
| Mickey's Farm | August 5, 2012 | January 12, 2025 | |
| The Mooh Brothers | September 4, 2012 | 2014 | |
| Lassie | November 3, 2012 | 2018 | |
| The Choo Choo Bob Show | 2012 | 2021 | |
| Fluffy Gardens | 2012 | 2018 | |
| From Aardvark to Zucchini | 2012 | 2022 | |
| Totally, Zinghoppers | 2012 | 2022 | |
| Christopher Columbus | 2013 | 2020 | |
| Miss BG | 2013 | 2018 | |
| RocKids TV | 2013 | 2021 | |
| The Tails of Abbygail | 2013 | 2018 | |
| The Adventures of Skippy | 2014 | 2019 | |
| Katakune | 2014 | 2022 | |
| Mouse in the House | 2014 | 2014 | |
| PicTrain | 2014 | 2020 | |
| Tiny Square Critters | 2014 | 2021 | |
| Wild About Animals | 2014 | 2021 | |
| Zoo Clues | 2014 | | |
| Tune Time | January 9, 2015 | January 12, 2025 | (Note: This show aired on TBN from 2020 to October 31, 2020.) |
| Hippothesis | 2015 | 2015 | |
| Rocka-Bye Island | 2015 | January 12, 2025 | |
| Why? | 2015 | 2015 | |
| The Fred and Susie Show | February 10, 2016 | January 14, 2021 | |
| Owlegories | 2017 | 2021 | (Note: This show aired on TBN from April 4, 2020 to October 24, 2020.) |
| Superbook (2011) | July 15, 2018 | March 31, 2022 | |
| Theo | May 2018 | 2023 | |
| Topsy Turvy | 2018 | 2022 | |
| Two by 2 | 2018 | | |
| Ryan Defrates: Secret Agent | 2020 | 2021 | |
| Sea Kids | 2020 | 2021 | |
| Face Your Fears with the Moores | September 3, 2021 | January 12, 2025 | |
| Becky and Todd's Bible Adventures | 2021 | January 11, 2025 | |
| Holy Moly | 2021 | | |
| Whirl: Ada & Friends | 2021 | January 11, 2025 | |
| Whirl: Leo & Friends | 2021 | January 11, 2025 | |
| Storytime With Anthony Destefano | 2021 | January 12, 2025 | |
| What's in the Bible? with Buck Denver | 2023 | | |
| Bethel Music Kids: Come Alive | unknown | | |
| Bono Duck 90-Second Radio Show | unknown | | |
| Booples Video Animated Shorts | unknown | | |
| The Boulder Buddies Music Videos | unknown | | |
| Boy Plus Dog | unknown | | |
| The Enríquez Family | unknown | | |
| Gaither's Pond | unknown | | |
| God Rocks! Music Videos | unknown | | |
| The Hugglers | unknown | | |
| Kidz Quest | unknown | | |
| Matsiko Children's Choir | unknown | | |
| Nite Nite Franky Show | unknown | | |
| Super Naturally Healthy Kids with Chef Joanne | unknown | | |
| The Super Snooprs | unknown | | |
| Wee Sing | unknown | | |
| Weekend Movie Showcase | unknown | | |
| Yancy and Friends: Little Praise Party | unknown | | |

=== Short-form programming ===
| Title | Premiere date | End date | Source(s) |
|---|---|---|---|
| I'm an Animal | 2006 | 2017 | |
