= Kids Club (TV programming block) =

Children's programming on TBN, 1993–2005

- Network: TBN
- Launched: May 22, 1993; 33 years ago
- Closed: December 17, 2005; 20 years ago
- Country of origin: United States
- Owner: Trinity Broadcasting Network
- Format: Defunct Saturday morning children's program block
- Running time: 7.5 hours (1993–98, 2000-01); 8 hours (1998-2000, 2001-02); 9.5 hours (2002-06)
- Original language: English

Kids Club was an American children's programming block that aired on TBN from May 22, 1993 to December 17, 2005. The block was aimed at children between the ages of 2 and 12 years, and offered a mix of children's religious and family-oriented programming.

== History ==
Prior to 1993, TBN's Saturday morning children's block had no branding. Commercial breaks during the block primarily featured public service announcements, interstitials encouraging viewers to support Christian television, and TBN promos. On May 22, 1993, TBN re-branded its children's block as Kids Club and introduced two new shows to the block; Curtain Climbing Kids Club and Kids Like You. The public service announcements and "support Christian television" interstitials were replaced with newer interstitials targeted to kids, as well as scenes from the Curtain Climbing Kids Club TV series.

On March 30, 2002, the Curtain Climbing Kids Club TV series aired for the final time on the block, but interstitials related to the series continued to air. On December 24, 2005, TBN re-branded its Saturday morning block as Smile of a Child TV, but on TBN, the block itself from the Smile of a Child TV block started to be used on October 7, 2006.

== Programming ==
- Becky's Barn (1993-1997)
- Bibleman (2005-2006)
- BJ's Teddy Bear Club and Bible Stories (2006)
- Circle Square (1993-1998, 2000-2006)
- Cherub Wings (2002-2006)
- Colby's Clubhouse (1995-2006)
- Curtain Climbing Kids Club (1993-2002)
- Davey and Goliath (1993–94, 2002–06)
- The Dooley and Pals Show (2004-2006)
- Faithville (1997-2006)
- The Filling Station (1993-1996)
- The Flying House (1993-2006)
- Fun Food Adventures (2006)
- The Gospel Bill Show (1993-2005)
- Greatest Heroes and Legends of the Bible (2002–06)
- Jacob's Ladder (2006)
- Janice's Attic (1997-2006)
- Joy Junction (1993-2005)
- Just the Facts (1996-2002)
- K10C: Kids' Ten Commandments (2004–06)
- Kids Against Crime (1994-2006)
- Kids Like You (1993-2006)
- Kids on the Move (1998–99)
- Kingdom Adventure (2006)
- The Knock Knock Show (2002-2006)
- Maralee Dawn & Friends (2006)
- Miss Charity's Diner (2004–06)
- McGee and Me! (2005–06)
- Mr. Henry's Wild & Wacky World (2004–06)
- Nanna's Cottage (2006)
- Pahappahooey Island (2005-2006)
- Quigley's Village (1993-2000)
- The Reppies (1999-2006)
- Retro News: A Blast From the Past (2006)
- Superbook (1993-2004)
- Worship for Kids (1994-1995)
- WWJDtv with Gina Thompson (2002-2004)
