= Joel Engel =

Joel Engel may refer to:

- Joel Engel (composer) (1868–1927), music critic, composer, and leading figure in the Jewish art music movement
- Joel S. Engel (born 1936), American engineer

== See also ==
- Joel Engle (born 1968), American author, pastor, and Christian recording artist
- Joe Engel (1893–1969), American baseball player and scout
