= Willie Aames =

American actor, film and television director (born 1960)

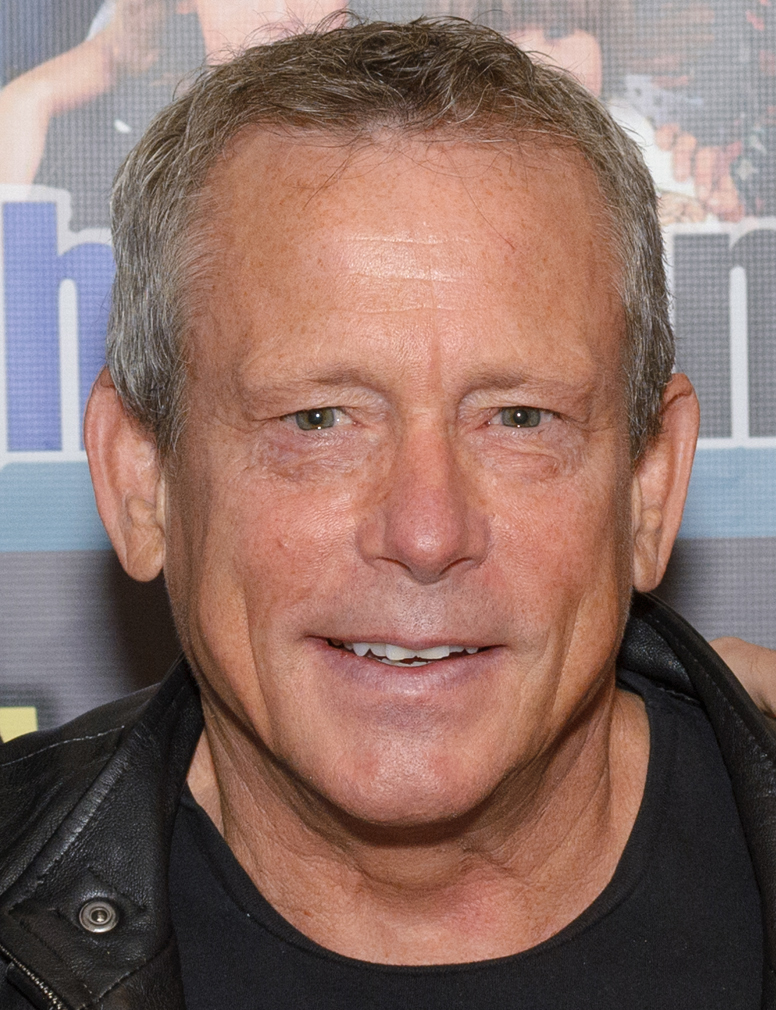
- Aames at the Chiller Theatre Expo, 2017
- Born: Albert William Upton; July 15, 1960 (age 66); Newport Beach, California, U.S.
- Other name: Willie Ames
- Occupations: Actor; director; producer; screenwriter; comedian
- Years active: 1971–present
- Known for: Eight Is Enough; Dungeons & Dragons; Charles in Charge; Bibleman; The Swiss Family Robinson
- Spouses: Vicki Weatherman (m. 1979–1984) Maylo McCaslin (m. 1986–2009) Winnie Hung (m. 2014)
- Children: 2

Albert William Upton (born July 15, 1960), known professionally as Willie Aames, is an American actor, film and television director, television producer, and screenwriter.

He is widely known for playing Tommy Bradford, one of the children of Tom Bradford (played by Dick Van Patten), on the 1970s television series Eight Is Enough, TJ Latimer in Family, Buddy Lembeck on the 1980s sitcom Charles in Charge, and the title character in the direct-to-video series Bibleman (1995–2003). He is also credited as Willie Ames.

== Early life ==
Aames was born in Newport Beach, California, in 1960. He attended Edison High School in Huntington Beach, California, and he was in both the choir and the Madrigal Ensemble.

== Career ==
Aames began acting in the late 1960s as a child, appearing in shows such as Gunsmoke, The Wonderful World of Disney, Adam-12, and The Courtship of Eddie's Father. In 1971, he originated the role of Leonard Unger, the son of Felix Unger (Tony Randall), on the ABC-TV series The Odd Couple, a part that was later played by Leif Garrett. The following year, he provided the voice of the character of Jamie Boyle in the animated series Wait Till Your Father Gets Home.

He guest-starred on various television series, including The Waltons. In 1974, he portrayed a 12-year-old Benjamin Franklin in the miniseries Benjamin Franklin. The next year, he co-starred in the series The Swiss Family Robinson.

In 1977, he landed the role of Tommy Bradford in the comedy-drama Eight Is Enough. During this period, he played in a band called Willie Aames & Paradise, in which he was lead singer/guitarist. Formed while Aames was in junior high school, the group eventually landed a recording contract with CBS Custom Label. During this time, Aames appeared in his first movie role, Scavenger Hunt. After the series ended in 1981, Aames appeared in more film roles, including Zapped! with Scott Baio and Paradise with Phoebe Cates.

Before portraying the role of Buddy Lembeck in Charles in Charge in 1984, Aames played the character of Robbie Hamlin on the ABC soap opera The Edge of Night. From 1983 to 1985, he was the voice of Hank on the cartoon Dungeons & Dragons. After the end of Charles in Charge in 1990, Aames hosted the game show The Krypton Factor.

Aames starred as Bibleman in the direct-to-video Christian superhero series from 1995 to 2003.

In 2010, Aames's career changed direction when he began working as a cruise director for Regent Seven Seas Cruises. He also worked for Oceania Cruises and Viking (Ocean) Cruises, then returned to acting in 2016.

In 2024, Aames starred in the Karen Lam directed dark comedy Armageddon Road which takes place in Las Vegas in 1976.

== Personal life ==
Aames is a Christian. He has been married three times. Aames married Vicki Weatherman in 1979, having one child, Christopher. He married Maylo McCaslin in 1986, having one child, Harleigh Jean. Aames married Winnie Hung in 2014.

Aames has battled alcohol addiction. He admitted to cutting himself following guilt over stealing a bottle of whiskey from his landlord. In 2009, following the repossession of his car, Aames hosted a garage sale in Olathe, Kansas, to sell off memorabilia and autographs, which was attended by fans as well as those in similar situations from the Great Recession.

== Filmography ==
Television
Year	Title	Role	Notes
1971	The Odd Couple	Leonard	Episode: "Win One for Felix"
1971–1972	The Courtship of Eddie's Father	Harold O'Brien	4 episodes
1971, 1973	Gunsmoke	Tom / Andy	2 episodes
1971, 1974	Adam-12	Young Boy / Billy Ray	2 episodes
1971–1975	Medical Center	Eric / Jeff	3 episodes
1972	Cannon	Petey Macklin	Episode: "A Flight of Hawks"
1972–1974	Wait Till Your Father Gets Home	Jamie Boyle (voice)	38 episodes
1973	Adam's Rib	Boy	Episode: "Katey at the Bat"
1973	Frankenstein	William Frankenstein	Two-part episode of The Wide World of Mystery
1974	Benjamin Franklin	Benjamin Franklin (at 12 years old)	Miniseries; episode: "The Whirlwind"
1974	The Wonderful World of Disney	Jeff Peterson	Episode: "Runaway on the Rogue River"
1975	The Waltons	Danny Comley	Episode: "The Beguiled"
1975	We'll Get By	Kenny Platt	12 episodes
1975–1976	The Swiss Family Robinson	Fred Robinson	20 episodes
1976	Rich Man, Poor Man Book II	Young Wesley Jordache	Miniseries; episode: "Chapter I"
1976–1977	Family	T.J. Latimer	6 episodes
1977	Little House on the Prairie	Seth Johnson	Episode: "Injun Kid"
1977–1981	Eight Is Enough	Tommy Bradford	111 episodes
1982	The Love Boat	Danny	Episode: "Doc's Nephew"
1983	The Edge of Night	Robbie Hamlin	
1983–1985	Dungeons & Dragons	Hank the Ranger (voice)	27 episodes
1984–1990	Charles in Charge	Buddy Lembeck	126 episodes
1986	Blacke's Magic	Eric Wilson	Episode: "The Revenge of the Esperanza"
1987	Eight Is Enough: A Family Reunion	Tommy Bradford	TV movie
1989	An Eight Is Enough Wedding	Tommy Bradford	TV movie
1995–2003	Bibleman	Miles Peterson / Bibleman	23 episodes
2005	Celebrity Fit Club – Season 2	Himself	8 episodes
2006	Bugtime Adventures	Narrator	13 episodes
2007	MacMillan River Adventures - Season 1	Himself	27 episodes
2008	Celebrity Fit Club: Boot Camp – Season 8	Himself	8 episodes
2015	Harvest Moon	William Stone	Hallmark TV movie
2016	Dater's Handbook	Kyle	Hallmark TV movie
2016	Every Christmas Has A Story	Vernon Hollis	Hallmark TV movie
2017	Date My Dad	Principal Reed	2 episodes
2019	Love on the Menu	Martin Thomas	Hallmark TV movie
2020	Picture Perfect Mysteries: Exit Stage Death	Neil Khan	Hallmark TV movie

Film
Year	Film	Role	Notes
1979	Scavenger Hunt	Kenny Stevens	
1982	Paradise	David	
1982	Zapped!	Peyton Nichols	
1984	Goma-2	Tony	Alternative title: Killing Machine
1985	Cut and Run	Tommy Allo	Alternative title: Amazon: Savage Adventure
2003	The Missy Files	—	Direct-to-video; Director, writer
2003	Dickie Roberts: Former Child Star	Himself	
2020	Bottle Monster	George	
