= Al Denson =

American singer

- Birth name: Albert Wray Denson
- Born: May 13, 1960 (age 64); Starkville, Mississippi U.S.
- Genres: Contemporary Christian
- Occupation(s): Singer, songwriter, television host
- Instrument: Keyboards
- Years active: 1980–present
- Website: www.aldenson.com

Albert Wray Denson (born May 13, 1960, in Starkville, Mississippi), more commonly known as Al Denson, is a contemporary Christian music artist and a Christian radio and television show host.

== Biography ==
Denson first became well known for his involvement with contemporary Christian music. As of 2005, he has written 19 songs that reached the top 10 on Christian radio charts nationwide. He has seven songs that reached the No. 1 position on the Christian radio charts: "Peace Be Still", "Shine Out the Light", "To Forgive", "Be the One", "Take Me to the Cross", "Be", and "Come and Fill This Place". In addition, he has been nominated for five Dove Awards, and he won Song of the Year. He has been a featured performer for Billy Graham's and Franklin Graham's crusades and Dawson McAllister Ministries, and was a frequent guest on Fire By Nite.

Denson also hosts a weekly television show called The Al Denson Show, which is aired on TBN, Daystar, and INSP, as well as among the 36 channels on the Sky Angel nationwide direct-to-home satellite TV service. He has since also started a program called The Parent Factor, a radio show geared towards parents.

In addition, Denson developed a line of curriculum for school children in the United States, which teaches character education and emphasizes instilling good character qualities in children.

As of 2019, Denson served as Liberty University's commercial music industry liaison.

Denson resides just outside Dallas, Texas.

== Discography ==
- 1985: Stand Up
- 1988: The Battle is On
- 1989: Al Denson
- 1990: Be the One
- 1992: The Extra Mile
- 1993: Reasons
- 1995: Do You Know This Man?
- 1997: Take Me to the Cross
- 1998: Reunion Praise
- 1998: Tabula Rasa
- 2000: From This Day On
- 2000: Awakening the Heart of Worship
- 2003: With One Voice
- 2005: Amazing Love

== Videography ==
- 1990: Be The One
- 1992: The Extra Mile
- 1992: To Forgive
- 1994: Alcatraz
- 1994: The Door
- 1994: I Know A Love
- 1994: Reasons
- 1994: INSP Live Television Special (INSP exclusive)
- 1997: "Take Me to the Cross"
- 2000: An Evening of Praise with Al Denson
