= Djoir =

American actress, singer, songwriter and music producer (born 1985)

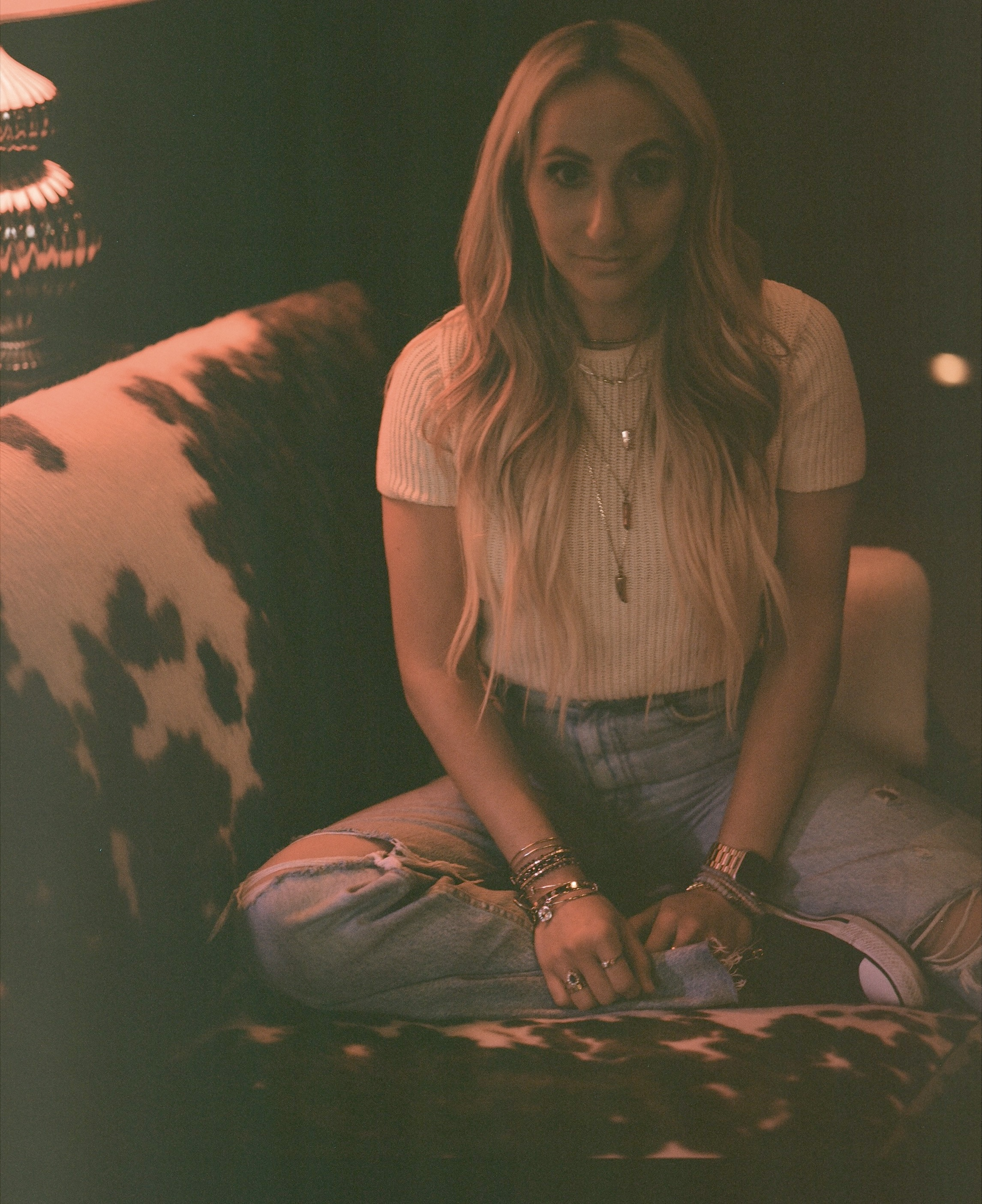
- Djoir at EASTWEST STUDIO in 2021
- Born: Dawn Marlane Jordan; April 12, 1985 (age 41); Los Angeles, California, U.S.
- Occupations: Singer; Songwriter; Producer; Actress; Influencer; Host
- Musical career
- Genres: Pop; Country; R&B; EDM; Rock; Funk; Christian; Contemporary; Lofi; Reggae; Metal
- Instrument: Vocals
- Website: www.djoir.com

Dawn Marlane Jordan (born April 12, 1985), known professionally as Djoir, is an American pop singer, songwriter, producer, actress, influencer, and host.

== Early life and career beginnings ==
Dawn "Djoir" Jordan was born on April 12, 1985. Djoir Jordan grew up in Los Angeles, California. She began taking dance lessons at age 6 and was involved in competitive gymnastics. She began her entertainment career at a very young age, performing for four and a half years (56 Episodes) on the syndicated children's TV show Colby's Clubhouse which aired on Trinity Broadcasting Network, beginning in 1995. On the show she worked closely with Krysta Rodriguez of NBC Series Smash; Crystal Lewis and Casey Lagos. She played the role of Psalty, The Singing Songbook's daughter, Harmony, in the Musical Harvest Kid's Crusades performing at Qualcomm Stadium and Anaheim Stadium.

== Career ==
As an adult, Dawn "Djoir" Jordan spent time as a singer and performer in female pop groups including, Minx Mafia (formerly Vaniti Girlz). The group went on a hiatus in 2008. Djoir later went on to pursue the path of a solo artist. Her motto as an artist is "Be Diamond Cut", which means "To Be Unique, Stand Out and Reflect Your Light". Djoir was given the name by Mr. Dalvin of Jodeci, it is a combination of her first and last name.

Her 1st single release with Danny Coggin, a.k.a. NOVASPACE, entitled “Control (ft. Djoir Jordan)" released by Into the AM Records, quickly climbed to #62 on Beatport’s Electro House chart and gained support from Top EDM DJ's around the world including Parasite, who produced a remix of "Control". Her 2nd single release with NOVASPACE, entitled "Right Now (ft. Djoir Jordan)" released by Dirty Duck Audio, climbed to #13 on the UK charts and gained support from DJs Knife Party and Gold Top.

Djoir has performed and/or worked with DEV, George Shelby of the George Shelby Band, Aaron Carter, Hyper Crush, Táta Vega of 20 Feet From Stardom, Redfoo, Hok of Quest Crew (winners of Season 3's America's Next Best Dance Crew), LMFAO, FUEL, Cassandra Mills, Dalvin DeGrate and K-Ci of Jodeci, Ginuwine, Shane Sparks, Jason Edmonds, 112, Reel Big Fish, NOVASPACE, Shaneal Funk, Breanna Kennedy and others. She has also made appearances in Redfoo's music video New Thang and LMFAO's music video Party Rock Anthem.

Djoir's 4th single "Partypocalypse" aired on the TV series Rush on the USA Network's "Learning To Fly" episode, July 31, 2014. Djoir Jordan's 2nd single "Get This Party Rockin (ft HP)" was featured in Season 4, Episode 5 of the Netflix series Orange Is the New Black which aired June 17, 2016, as well as in the movie trailer for Best Night Ever that hit theaters January 2014. Her song "Partypocalypse" was also featured on ABC Family's TV series Pretty Little Liars on the Episode entitled "Fresh Meat", which aired on January 13, 2015. Djoir and Janel Parrish, who stars in Pretty Little Liars, were both co-lead singers in a girl group called Impulse in 2003.

In 2014, Djoir received nominations for Pop Single of the Year and Solo Performer of the Year for the 2014 LA Music Awards.

Her song "Partypocalypse" was featured on the 20th Century Fox Film, The Longest Ride which was released in theaters April 10, 2015. Djoir also appeared in the October 2015 release of the movie Jem and The Holograms.

On October 11, 2016, Djoir released her single "Warrior", the first track to be released off her upcoming EP entitled "Name On It", due on January 27, 2017. She performed 5 songs off her EP live, as part of a Guinness World Record, set by Cricket Wireless for Longest Non-TV Promotional/Advert Commercial. The world record was set between December 20, 2016 to December 21, 2016 in a 24-hour live broadcast.
