= Kenny Marks =

American singer

- Born: Kenneth Michael Marks; November 6, 1950; Detroit, Michigan, U.S.
- Origin: Nashville, Tennessee
- Died: October 31, 2018 (aged 67)
- Genre: Contemporary Christian
- Occupations: Musician, singer, songwriter
- Instruments: Vocals, guitar
- Years active: 1982–2018
- Labels: Myrrh, DaySpring, Word, Tranquility
- Website: kennymarks.com

Kenneth Michael Marks (November 6, 1950 – October 31, 2018) was an American Christian singer.

== Early life and education ==
Marks' father Mirko “Michael” Mrakovic and mother Ljubica “Lucy” Vukic were from Yugoslavia. His parents changed their surname Mrakovic to Marks three months before he was born. Mirko was born in what is now Croatia in 1922 and he first moved to Canada before living in the U.S. Growing up in Detroit, Marks studied classical piano and learned to play guitar at age 13. He graduated from Messiah College in Mechanicsburg, Pennsylvania west of Philadelphia in 1971. While in college he was the drummer in a contemporary Christian group, the Fellowship.

== Career ==
Marks began performing for Billy Graham's Afterglow Concert Series. In 1981 Marks participated in a project called "Premiere Performance" run by Myrrh Records. His song was on an album with songs by various artists and an invitation for buyers to vote for their favorite who would be offered a full contract with the Christian recording label. Marks was the fans choice.

Marks' first album Follow Him was released on Myrrh Records in 1982. With his second album 1984's Right Where You Are, he began to find his own definitive style as an artist and wanting to sing about relationships. In the 1990s, he became a host on the Nashville based Shop at Home TV Network.

== Music ==
Jeannie and Johnny, a fictitious Franklin High School couple created by Marks, appear on his albums Attitude (1985) and Make It Right (1987). In the song, "Growing Up Too Fast" they are two individual kids dealing separately with emotions and impulses. In "The Party's Over, they meet at a party and get together in the back seat of Johnny's car, resulting in a pregnancy which robs them of their carefree teenage lifestyle.

On the album Another Friday Night, with the song, "Next Time You See Johnny", Johnny has left Jeannie with their son, who is old enough to hurt over Daddy's leaving, and innocent enough to hold forgiveness in his heart for Johnny. "Fire of Forgiveness" is the fourth and final song, a reflection of Johnny looking back on his life. Another song "Friends", was the theme song for the dramatic segment on the series Fire by Nite called "Friends". The song "Say a Prayer for Me Tonight" reflects on a true story when a young man named Richard talked to Marks after a concert in Philadelphia on his Make It Right tour and asked Marks to pray for him and then shared some songs he had written. Three weeks later Marks learned that Richard had committed suicide.

"White Dress", which began as a song for Marks' daughter Allegra on her first birthday, is the story of a girl growing up abandoned by her father who becomes a mother.

== Personal life ==
Marks was married to Pamela Marks for twenty-four years; she co-wrote some of his songs. They divorced in 1997.

Marks died of a heart attack on October 31, 2018.

== Discography ==
- Follow Him 1982
- Right Where You Are 1984
- Attitude 1986
- Make It Right 1987
- Another Friday Night 1990
- Fire of Forgiveness 1992
- Absolutely Positively 1994
- World Gone Mad 1995
- Best That I Can 2015
