= Fire by Nite =

American Christian variety TV show

- Genre: Christian variety show
- Created by: Willie George; Stephen Yake; Blaine Bartel
- Developed by: Willie George Ministries (1986-1993); Fire by Nite Ministries (1994-1995)
- Directed by: Eric J. Smith (1992-1993); Patrick J. McGuire (1994-1995)
- Presented by: Blaine Bartel (1986-1992, 1994-1995); Eastman Curtis (1992-1993)
- Theme music composer: Todd Homer
- Country of origin: United States
- Original language: English
- No. of seasons: 8-9
- No. of episodes: 91 (known)

Production
- Executive producers: Willie George (1986-1993); Blaine Bartel (1994-1995)
- Producers: Stephen Yake (1986-1992); Patrick J. McGuire (1994-1995)
- Production locations: Tulsa, Oklahoma (1986-1993); Colorado Springs, Colorado (1994-1995)
- Running time: 60 minutes (1986-1993); 30 minutes (1994-1995)

Original release
- Network: Home video (1986-1995); TBN (1995); JCTV (unknown)
- Release: September 1986 – 1995

Fire by Nite was a Christian variety show produced by Willie George Ministries in Tulsa, Oklahoma. FBN was hosted by Blaine Bartel for most of its production and marketed primarily to Christian youth. Episodes typically centered on a relevant theme intermixed with comedic skits, interviews with popular Christian musicians, musical performances, and light evangelism.

== Production history ==
Production for Fire By Nite was partially funded by a subscription program - for a monthly or yearly fee, viewers could have episodes delivered to them in the mail on VHS and Betamax.

=== Original Format and evolution (1986–1992) ===
Originally, Fire By Nite was not filmed in front of a live studio audience. From the first episode, featuring Carman, in 1986, to episode #47, the end of FBN's fourth year, Fire by Nite segments were prerecorded in the Willie George Ministries television studio in Tulsa, Oklahoma. The show followed a Saturday Night Live-style variety format, and each episode opened in a similar fashion, with a cast member saying "Almost live on videotape, it's Fire By Nite." At first all musical guests performed their songs live, but FBN later began producing music videos for their guests.

A typical episode followed this pattern:

1. Introduction of Host and Show Theme
2. Introduction of Episode by Host
3. Skit 1
4. Performance by Guest Music Artist
5. "What's Hot?" with Ron Luce (until 1990)
6. Skit 2
7. Interview with Guest Music Artist or additional Guest
8. "Family First", a sitcom feature within the program
9. Message by Blaine Bartel

In the fall of 1990, producer and host Blaine Bartel implemented a major change in the show's format, giving the show an overall talk show look by filming from a new set that included a live band and studio audience. Churches that participated in the Fire by Nite video purchase club were invited to bring their youth groups to attend tapings of the show. In January 1991, the long running sitcom "Family First" ended its run. Several months later, in June '91, the new recurring story "Friends" premiered.

Occasionally FBN released two part series such as, "Sex: What Do You Pay to Play?", "Satanism Unmasked", and "The Evolution of the American Teenager". Each of the two part series featured a special set, no live band, and fewer skits. "Satanism Unmasked" purported to investigate the supernatural influence Satanism, witchcraft, and Dungeons & Dragons. "The Evolution of the American Teenager" was a docu-drama produced in the summer of 1992 that chronicled the changes in teenage culture from the 1950s to the then present, 1992. It also discussed the "counter-culture" of the Jesus Movement and how it changed the landscape of the contemporary Christian church.

Director/Editor, Eric J. Smith joined Fire By Nite in February 1992. Within three months, Smith and FBN writer Tony Leech were unsatisfied with what they saw as the antiquated Family First sitcom. Smith and Leech petitioned Bartel on what they considered a more sophisticated comedy concept for a new serial comedy they entitled, "God Save the Queen". Bartel, Smith and Leech led the crew to a new aesthetic, revamping the entire program. The old format was going to be retired after the "Evolution of the American Teenager" two-part series, after which the new format would be unveiled.

During the production of the premiere episode of "God Save the Queen", Executive Producer and Pastor Willie George and Bartel had a meeting about the new direction that FBN was taking. George thought it was straying from the direction he had originally envisioned for the show, and Bartel chose to quietly tender his resignation and pursue his ambition to become a lead pastor in Colorado Springs. Smith, Leech, and a few other key production staff members met with Pastor George to discuss the new direction. Tony Leech resigned, but Smith stayed on board to oversee the transition from Blaine Bartel to Eastman Curtis in the late summer of 1992. "God Save the Queen" was scrapped (never to be seen by Fire By Nite fans), and Eastman Curtis took over the lead role in yet another new concept. Smith resigned his position in March 1993. (Two years later, Smith returned to the staff of Willie George Ministries and was employed there for just over two years and continued to freelance for them until the late 1990s before moving back to his hometown). Willie George Ministries only produced three more episodes of Fire By Nite, after Smith left, before they ended production of the program.

It was well understood that before the prior incident, Executive Producer, Pastor Willie George, had kept a fairly laissez-faire approach to the Fire By Nite program, entrusting it to Producer and host Blaine Bartel. Under Bartel's leadership, the Fire by Nite subscription base had gone from 300 members when it started to more than 4,500 members at the time of his departure. Subscriptions dropped dramatically after the host and leadership changes and upheaval. After this incident, Pastor Willie George kept a close eye on this and every other production, including the very successful Oneighty program.

=== Interjection of Eastman Curtis (1992-1993) ===
After Eastman Curtis took over hosting duties, parts of the show changed dramatically. The show was no longer filmed before a live audience, there was only one skit in addition to the main drama "The Halls of Highland", and all musical guest segments were music videos. Despite the format change, FBN continued to be a leader in its genre, and continued to be chosen for the "world premiere" of Christian music videos.

=== Blaine Bartel returns and the end (1994-1995) ===
When production of Fire By Nite moved to Blaine Bartel's church in Colorado, the format of the show changed slightly again. Other than the new segment "The Adventures of Doug and Clarence", all other comedy sketches were recycled from previous episodes of the show. The program length was reduced from 60 minutes to 30 minutes, and followed this format:

1. Show intro/theme
2. "This Just In" (commentary on current events affecting young Christians) by Lee Wilson.
3. Music Video
4. Drama: "The Adventures of Doug & Clarence"
5. Message by Blaine Bartel

== Episodes ==
Episode numbers where available are taken from the title cards at the beginning of each video. Tape numbers, where available, are taken either from the VHS labels or Willie George Ministries promotional material. After episode #60, the episode number was no longer listed on the title card.

Sep-86 #001 Peer Pressure (Carman)
Oct-86 #002 Renewing the Mind (Glad) (03-203)
Nov-86 #003 Rebellion (2nd Chapter of Acts) (03-205)
Dec-86 #004 Drugs and Drinking (Casey Treat/Teen Challenge Choir) (03-207)

Jan-87 #005 Beating the Blues (Petra) (03-209)
Feb-87 #006 How to Face the Future (DeGarmo and Key) (03-211)
Mar-87 #007 The Truth About Rock (Mylon LeFevre) (03-213)
Apr-87 #008 Evangelism/Soulwinning (Russ Taff) (03-215)
May-87 #009 The Power of Faith (Benny Hester/The Power Team) (03-217)
Jun-87 #010 Sex, Dating, and Relationships (Sheila Walsh) (03-219)
Jul-87 #011 Can't Get No Satisfaction (Randy Stonehill) (03-221)
Aug-87 #012 Honesty vs. Lying (Bryan Duncan)
Sep-87 #013 Nobody's Purfekt (1st Anniversary Special) (Kenny Marks)
Oct-87 #014 Running Scared (Morgan Cryar)
Nov-87 #015 Real Friendship (Phil Keaggy)
Dec-87 #016 How to Raise Your Parents (Kim Boyce)

Jan-88 #017 Commitment (aka Being Truly Committed) (Rob Frazier) (03-233)
Feb-88 #018 Don't Say Suicide (Rick Cua)
Mar-88 #019 Conquering Temptation (Petra)
Apr-88 #020 If God Be For Us (Mylon LeFevre)
May-88 #021 The Call of God (Stephen Wiley)
Jun-88 #022 Discipline to Win (Ruscha) (03-243)
Jul-88 #023 Satanism Unmasked I (Mike Warnke) (03-297)
Aug-88 #024 Satanism Unmasked II (Lauren Stratford, etc.) (03-299)
Sep-88 #025 Are We All Not Missionaries? (Rich Mullins)
Oct-88 #026 The Prayer Zone (aka The Power of Prayer) (David and the Giants)
Nov-88 #027 These Last Days (DeGarmo and Key)
Dec-88 #028 Strife, Who Needs It? (Whitecross)

Jan-89 #029 In the World, Not of the World (Reneé Garcia)
Feb-89 #030 Why Feel Guilty (Margaret Becker)
Mar-89 #031 Finding Your Place in Christ (Andre Walton and Steve Geyer)
Apr-89 #032 Idol Busters (aka Idols in Your Life) (Carman) (03-263)
May-89 #033 Why Good People Go to Hell (Toymaker's Dream)
Jun-89 #034 Let's Face the Music (Kim Boyce and friends)
Jul-89 #035 Spiritual Warfare (Petra)
Aug-89 #036 Crowd Control (Rick Cua)
Sep-89 #037 Jesus, Tougher Than Nails (Michael W. Smith) (03-273)
Oct-89 #038 Sex, What Do You Pay to Play I (Josh McDowell)
Nov-89 #039 Sex, What Do You Pay to Play II (various music videos but no guest)
Dec-89 #040 Missions: How to Rock Your World (Twila Paris)
Dec-89 Christmas Special (Altar Boys) This was a special video prepared for broadcast markets that aired Fire by Nite at the time. It is more blatantly evangelistic in tone than most other episodes of the series, which tended to be geared toward a churched youth audience. It is not numbered in sequence with the other episodes. The opening skit appears to be an alternate take from the same session that produced the introduction and ending clips on "Idols In Your Life"; the rest of the skits, as well as the Family First episode, are recycled from previous episodes.

Jan-90 #041 Fight to the Finish: Forecast for the '90s (Kenny Marks)
Feb-90 #042 Spirit vs. Flesh (Allies)
Mar-90 #043 People in a Box: Teenagers and TV (John Schneider)
Apr-90 #044 Rejection: Feeling Lonely in a Crowded World (Bryan Duncan)
May-90 #045 Can You Reach My Friend? (Andre Walton)
Jun-90 #046 Out of the Danger Zone (Steve Geyer) (03-291)
Jul-90 #047 Why Bad People Go to Heaven (Geoff Moore) (03-293)
Aug-90 #048 70x7 Forgiveness (Lee Wilson) (03-295)
Sep-90 #049 Satanism Unmasked: The Return I (Carman) (First episode with a new set and new co-host Lee Wilson.)
Oct-90 #050 Satanism Unmasked: The Return II (Bob Larson)
Nov-90 #051 Save the Planet's People! (Petra) (03-301)
Dec-90 #052 Big Bucks: OMI2B Broke (Stephen Wiley) (03-303)

Jan-91 #053 Love That Just Won't Leave You Alone (Rez Band)
Feb-91 #054 Busted Brains, Happy Heart (Tony Campolo, Bryan Duncan, Kim Boyce)
Mar-91 #055 Prayer Force (Mylon and Broken Heart)
Apr-91 #056 No High Like the Most High: America on Drugs (Part I) (E.T.W.)
May-91 #057 No High Like the Most High Part II (Rick Cua)
Jun-91 #058 Friends: Don't Be Alone in Your Battlezone (DC Talk)
Jul-91 #059 Too Hot to Handle, Too Cold to Hold (Al Denson)
Aug-91 Taming the Tongue (Newsboys)
Sep-91 Blast From the Past! (5th Anniversary Special)
Oct-91 All for the Call (Kenny Marks)
Nov-91 Terminator Faith (Katina Boyz)
Dec-91 Twas the Day After Christmas Special (Chuckie P.)

Jan-92 Blood Sweat and Tears pt 1 (Michael Peace)
Feb-92 Blood Sweat and Tears pt 2 (White Heart)
Mar-92 Big Talk, Hot Walk (Kellye Huff)
Apr-92 Sex, Love and Dating (Josh McDowell and Petra)
May-92 Voices and Choices (Two Hearts)
Jun-92 Broken Heart, Broken Home (Rich Mullins)
Jul-92 Evolution of the American Teenager Part I
Aug-92 Evolution of the American Teenager Part II
Sep-92 The Great Adventure (Steven Curtis Chapman)
Oct-92 Life Is Short, Press On (Eastman Curtis) (NOTE: On this show, Blaine announces his departure from the show and introduces new COTM youth pastor Eastman Curtis as Fire by Nite's new host.)
Nov-92 Building Your Esteem in God (Rick Cua) (First permanent episode outside out the studio.)
Dec-92 Charting Your Course (Bride)

Jan-93 Turning the World Upside Down (Newsboys)
Feb-93 The Do It Generation (David Mullen)
Mar-93 Wearing Your Bully-Proof Vest: Guarding Your Heart (DC Talk)
Apr-93 Sexual Revolution or Revelation (John George and Whitecross)
May-93 How Do You Spell Success? F-A-I-T-H-F-U-L-N-E-S-S (Susan Ashton)
Jun-93 Cities Under Siege: America and Violent Crime (Eric Champion)
Jul-93 Bridging the Generation Gap (Phillips, Craig and Dean)
Aug-93 Tongue-Tied: Watch Your Words (Pam Thum)

After the August 1993 episode, production of Fire by Nite at Willie George Ministries shut down. Several episodes from the Willie George Ministries run were edited and re-released by Blaine Bartel during his time in Colorado.

May-94 Generation 911 (Bryan Duncan) (This program also featured a special look at the many bloopers and practical jokes done on the set of Fire by Nite entitled "Best of Boopers", supposed to be "Best of Bloopers".)
Jun-94 Unreasonable Christianity (Rick Cua)
Jul-94 Idol Breakdown (Ray Boltz)
Aug-94 Families Under Siege (Kenny Marks)
Sep-94 Sudden Fear (Mark Lowry)
Oct-94 Endangered Generation (Geoff Moore)
Dec-94 Around the World in 30 Minutes or So (Ron Luce)

Other episodes produced in Colorado exist; it is unknown how many of the previous episodes were re-released during this time period.

Fire by Nite has been removed from JCTV's broadcast schedule. It is not known if any broadcasters are still airing the show.

== After Fire by Nite ==
=== Blaine Bartel's new ministries, fall from grace, and restoration ===
Blaine Bartel testified that during his time with Willie George Ministries, Church On The Move and Fire By Nite, he began an addiction to pornography by watching an adult movie in a hotel room in Pennsylvania. In 2006, years after he planted a church in Dallas, Texas, he confessed of an affair he had during that time and resigned as pastor of the church. He was restored and became a member of the staff at Gregory Dickow's Life Changers International Church in Chicago. After trying to reconcile his 30-year marriage to his wife Cathy (who portrayed Connie Collins, Doug's sister, in the "Family First" serial), the couple would divorce that same year. He has since sought counselling and has recovered from his addiction. In 2012, he returned to Tulsa where he began attending a new church and met his current wife Lori, who he said was "extremely important part in my recovery and journey back". He started his own church Resurrection Tulsa, but it did not last. He has since started an online ministry to help men affected by porn addiction called .

=== Eastman Curtis' ministry ===
After Fire by Nite ended production in Tulsa in 1993, Curtis continued ministry in various ways. He also took his experience from hosting Fire by Nite to host a new teen-oriented Christian program This Generation.

== See also ==
- The Gospel Bill Show, another Christian youth television program from Willie George whose actors performed in skits for Fire by Night.
