= Jem and the Holograms (film) =

2015 musical drama film

- Theatrical release poster
- Directed by: Jon M. Chu
- Screenplay by: Ryan Landels
- Based on: Jem by Christy Marx
- Produced by: Jason Blum; Jon M. Chu; Scooter Braun; Brian Goldner; Stephen Davis; Bennett Schneir
- Starring: Aubrey Peeples; Stefanie Scott; Hayley Kiyoko; Aurora Perrineau; Ryan Guzman; Molly Ringwald; Juliette Lewis
- Cinematography: Alice Brooks
- Edited by: Jillian Moul; Michael Trent
- Music by: Nathan Lanier
- Production companies: Allspark Pictures; Blumhouse Productions; Chu Studios; SB Projects
- Distributed by: Universal Pictures
- Release date: October 23, 2015
- Running time: 118 minutes
- Country: United States
- Language: English
- Budget: $5 million
- Box office: $2.3 million

Jem and the Holograms is a 2015 American musical drama film produced and directed by Jon M. Chu, written by Ryan Landels, and starring Aubrey Peeples (as the title character), Stefanie Scott, Hayley Kiyoko, Aurora Perrineau, Ryan Guzman, Molly Ringwald and Juliette Lewis. Loosely based on Christy Marx's 1980s animated television series Jem, the film was produced by Allspark Pictures (a subsidiary of Hasbro Studios) and Blumhouse Productions.

Chu's interest in developing a film adaptation of Jem is based on having grown up watching the original series with his sisters. He had attempted to make the film 11 years earlier, but was rejected by Universal due to the cost.

Jem and the Holograms was theatrically released on October 23, 2015, by Universal Pictures. The film was a financial failure, grossing $2.3 million worldwide on a $5 million budget and was not well received by critics.

== Plot ==
Jerrica Benton and her younger sister, Kimber, live with their Aunt Bailey and two foster sisters, Aja and Shana. The four girls frequently videotape themselves playing music and wearing colorful outfits, but the shy Jerrica refuses to be videotaped while singing. Jerrica discovers that, due to Aunt Bailey's financial problems, they will have to sell their home. To release her frustration, Jerrica puts on a wig and makeup and records a video of herself singing a song she wrote.

Jerrica is interrupted just before she is about to delete the video, and Kimber uploads the video to YouTube. The video attracts millions of views in a single day. Jerrica is offered a record deal by Starlight Productions and travels to Los Angeles with her sisters. They meet music producer Erica Raymond and her son Rio. Erica is polite and courteous with the quartet, but shows particular interest in Jerrica, who she sees as a potential superstar.

The girls settle down in L.A. and discuss their next move. They have brought along a small robot called 51N3RG.Y (pronounced synergy), which was invented by Jerrica's deceased father, Emmett. The robot suddenly activates itself and leads them on a scavenger hunt. Each clue represents something Jerrica did or wanted to do with her father. The objective is to find several missing pieces designed to fit into the robot to be fully activated. The girls find the first piece on the Santa Monica Pier. They find the second clue in a guitar once owned by Emmett when, by coincidence, the band plays live.

Rio and Jerrica begin to develop romantic feelings for each other, much to Erica's dismay. Erica assigns Rio to another singer in an attempt to keep him away from Jerrica. Aunt Bailey tells Jerrica via FaceTime that their house is going for auction in a few days. Desperate to save the home, Jerrica asks Erica for an advance. Erica says she will oblige if Jerrica agrees to leave her sisters and go solo. Jerrica relents, believing Erica's decision will benefit her sisters and Aunt Bailey. When Jerrica's sisters find out, they denounce her for leaving them out of the deal and depart. After a dull solo performance, Jerrica becomes regretful and visits the L.A. house where she used to live with Kimber and her father.

Jerrica's sisters arrive and reconcile with her. They vow to help finish the scavenger hunt, and Rio joins them. Jerrica realizes that the last pieces of the puzzle are the earrings Emmett bequeathed to her, but Erica had them taken during her first visit to Starlight. The earrings are now stored in Erica's office. Rio and the girls break into Starlight and almost get caught by Erica, but succeed in retrieving the earrings. The reward is a final holographic message from Emmett. The group also discover Rio's late father's will, which grants him a majority of Starlight shares, effectively putting him in control of the company.

With the house safe, Jem and her sisters perform live. Rio chats with rock journalist Lindsey Pierce, who offers the band the Rolling Stone cover. Pierce asks Rio what to call the band; he suggests "Jem and the Holograms."

In a mid-credits scene, Erica, who has now been terminated from Starlight, seeks out a group of punkish young women in a seedy junkyard. She attempts to convince them to form a band to rival the Holograms. The girls initially refuse her offer out of bitterness stemming from Erica's decision to drop them from her label in the past. But when their leader, Pizzazz learns that Jem and Rio are dating, she takes Erica inside their trailer; graffiti on the side of the group's trailer reveals their name as the Misfits.

== Cast ==
- Aubrey Peeples as Jerrica "Jem" Benton, the lead singer of the Jem and the Holograms.
  - Isabella Rice as Young Jerrica "Jem" Benton
- Stefanie Scott as Kimber Benton, the sister of Jerrica.
- Hayley Kiyoko as Aja Leith, the foster sister of Jerrica and Kimber.
- Aurora Perrineau as Shana Elmsford, the foster sister of Jerrica and Kimber.
  - Wynter Perrineau as Young Shana Elmsford
- Juliette Lewis as Erica Raymond, a music producer who is a genderbent version of Eric Raymond from the cartoon series.
- Ryan Guzman as Mario "Rio" Raymond, the son of Erica Raymond who is based on Rio Pacheco from the cartoon series.
- Molly Ringwald as Aunt Bailey, the aunt of Jerrica and Kimber who is based on Mrs. Bailey from the cartoon series.
- Nathan Moore as "Zipper", the henchman of Erica Raymond.
- Barnaby Carpenter as Emmett Benton, the late father of Jerrica and Kimber.
- Ryan Hansen as Stephen, a security guard.
- Quddus as V.J.
- Kesha as Pizzazz (cameo), the lead singer of the Misfits.
- Hana Mae Lee as Roxy (cameo), a member of the Misfits.
- Katie Findlay as Stormer (cameo), a member of the Misfits.
- Eiza González as Jetta (cameo), a member of the Misfits.
- Jimmy Fallon as Himself (archive footage)
- Dwayne Johnson as Himself (archive footage)
- Alicia Keys as Herself (archive footage)
- Chris Pratt as Himself (archive footage)
- Nicholas Braun as Brad (uncredited), a valet
- Jamie Bernadette as a Reporter (uncredited)
- Djoir Jordan as Herself (uncredited)

Cameo appearances from the original TV series cast include: Samantha Newark, the voice of the original Jem, as a hairstylist; Britta Phillips as a stage manager; and Jem's creator Christy Marx as Lindsey Pierce, an editor for Rolling Stone.

In addition, Ariana Grande and her manager Scooter Braun (who also serves as the film's executive producer) were originally set to make cameo appearances; but their scene got cut from the final film.

== Production ==
With the recent successes of the live-action reboots of G.I. Joe and Transformers, Hasbro was rumored to be considering a live-action film with Universal Studios (Hasbro and Universal had signed a six-film contract in 2010), or a new incarnation of the animated series. On March 20, 2014, a live-action motion picture adaptation of Jem and the Holograms was announced to be directed by Jon M. Chu.

Chu has said he had spent ten years developing the film with producer Jason Blum. The film's musical producer, Scooter Braun, stated that he drew influence from his work on the career of Justin Bieber. It was later revealed that the original Jem writer Christy Marx was not involved in any part of the film's production. In response to her having no part or consultation on the film, Marx defended Chu's sense of ambition for the project via Facebook and left it up to the fans to decide whether or not the project was a "smart decision". Her lack of involvement was not permanent, however, and she was granted a minor speaking role near the end of the movie.

In April 2014, it was announced that Aubrey Peeples had been cast as Jem, with Stefanie Scott as Kimber, Hayley Kiyoko as Aja, and Aurora Perrineau as Shana. Peeples had admitted being initially unfamiliar with the franchise although she subsequently became familiar with it and became a fan quickly. Other parts were announced throughout the next couple of months with actor Ryan Guzman cast as Rio announced on April 30, Juliette Lewis's involvement on May 19, and Molly Ringwald on May 20. Principal photography began on April 22, 2014, in Van Nuys, later on May 19, shooting was underway in Los Angeles. Shooting ended on May 24, 2014.

On October 23, 2015, Chu stated he wanted to make a crossover film between Jem and the Holograms with Transformers and G.I. Joe.

== Soundtrack ==
The soundtrack for the film, featuring original compositions and also songs by Hailee Steinfeld and Dawin, was released in North America by Silent Records and Republic Records on October 23, 2015.

Jem and the Holograms (Original Motion Picture Soundtrack)
No.	Title	Artist	Length
1.	"Youngblood" (featuring Aubrey Peeples and Stefanie Scott)	Hilary Duff & Jem and the Holograms	3:04
2.	"Hit Me Up" (featuring Stefanie Scott)	Jem and the Holograms	3:36
3.	"Alone Together" (featuring Aubrey Peeples)	Jem and the Holograms	2:08
4.	"Cold Blooded"	Ida Maria	3:35
5.	"Mi Mi Mi"	Serebro	3:12
6.	"We Got Heart" (featuring Aubrey Peeples and Ryan Guzman)	Jem and the Holograms	2:57
7.	"Youngblood" (featuring Aubrey Peeples and Stefanie Scott)	Jem and the Holograms	2:58
8.	"Love Myself"	Hailee Steinfeld	3:38
9.	"Movie Star"	Hayley Kiyoko	3:18
10.	"The Way I Was" (featuring Aubrey Peeples)	Jem and the Holograms	3:43
11.	"Life of the Party"	Dawin	3:26
12.	"I'm Still Here"	Jem and the Holograms	3:44
13.	"Got It"	Marian Hill	3:12

== Release ==
=== Marketing ===
On February 25, 2015, the first official image from the film was released, featuring Peeples as Jem, Scott as Kimber and Kiyoko as Aja performing on stage. On May 12, 2015, director Chu revealed the first official film poster. The next day, on May 13, a trailer was released online, which was attached to the theatrical run of fellow female-centric Universal film Pitch Perfect 2. On August 11, a second trailer was released, this time featuring the robot 51N3RG.Y (pronounced synergy) which itself was based on the supercomputer of the original cartoon series, which generates and holographically projects the band's images and creates their special effects during stage performances. Critics responded negatively to the May 2015 trailer, noting that the reboot seems to share little with its animated predecessor. Hillary Crosley Coker of Jezebel commented that the film "looks like a less interesting version of Beyond the Lights". Uproxx noted the trailer's low rating on its official YouTube page, while The Huffington Post Canada wrote that the changes to the original plot have "disappointed '80s kids everywhere", then highlighted multiple negative fan reactions. Williesha Morris, also writing for Huffington, criticized the film's re-imagining of the Jerrica character, stating that the original cartoon "represented female empowerment, not angst". Scott and Blum have both addressed the negative reactions by asking fans to reserve judgment until release. Scott stated that "I think that they have to see the movie to understand that things that they think are missing are in there." Blum has described the film as being "a hundred percent true to the spirit of Jem".

=== Home media ===
Jem and the Holograms received a DVD and Blu-ray/DVD combo release on January 19, 2016. Special features include twelve deleted scenes, an audio commentary by director Chu, a gag reel, a music video for "Youngblood" and a featurette titled "Glam, Glitter, Fashion, and Fame: The Reinvention of Jem".

== Reception ==
=== Box office ===
Jem and the Holograms opened theatrically in North America on October 23, 2015, alongside The Last Witch Hunter, Paranormal Activity: The Ghost Dimension and Rock the Kasbah, as well as the wide release of fellow Universal drama Steve Jobs. It was initially projected for a $5 million opening weekend, but was lowered to $3 million after Thursday night previews earning $34,000 ($36 per theater average). The film ultimately opened fifteenth at the box office with $1.4 million, the worst opening of 2015, the fourth worst opening ever for a film screening in more than 2,000 theaters and the worst ever for a film released by a major studio. On November 10, just over two weeks later, Universal removed Jem from theaters entirely. Jason Guerrasio of Business Insider described the pull as "an unheard of move for a movie that was in theaters nationwide."

An international roll-out began the same weekend as its North American release, including Slovenia, Croatia, Iceland, Norway, Singapore, the United Kingdom and France. It never made theatrical release in Australia, instead being issued direct-to-DVD.

Jem grossed $2,184,640 in the United States and Canada, and $149,044 overseas, bringing its worldwide total to $2,333,684.

=== Critical reception ===
I get fans sending me hate mail, I get death threats, I get racist remarks — it's a really fun business. ... Reviewers have been harsh, to say it lightly.

— Jon M. Chu, Director

On the review aggregator website Rotten Tomatoes, 22% of 78 critics' reviews are positive, with an average rating of 3.9/10. The website's consensus reads: "Jem and the Holograms ignores its source material's goofy charm in favor of bland by-the-numbers drama." Metacritic, which uses a weighted average, assigned the film a score of 42 out of 100, based on 16 critics, indicating "mixed or average" reviews. Audiences polled by CinemaScore gave an average grade of "B+" on an A+ to F scale.

Among both positive and negative reviewers alike, Lewis's performance was singled out for praise. Pam Powell of the Daily Journal wrote "Juliette Lewis seems to have the most fun role as the evil, self-serving, egomaniac music manager who will stop at nothing to lure the young and trusting singer into her lair. She’s over-the-top, but in a very entertaining way... able to seem completely honest when telling reporters about how genuine and real Jem is immediately following a scene where she’s given the Holograms what amounts to forced corporate makeovers." Dominic Griffin, writing for Spectrum Culture, noted a "career-best turn from Lewis, operating so many miles ahead of her co-stars and the film they’re all stuck in that she’s ducking clouds, meteorites and the surface of the sun itself, delivering a master class in the expressive power of narrowing one’s eyes at exactly the right moment". Courtney Howard of Fresh Fiction wrote "who really steals the show is Lewis. She brings her bonafide rock-star swagger to the fold and plays it to the hilt – never going campy. Her version of a Ra’s-Al-Ghul-esque character in this origin story exudes charisma, sass and dedication."

Charlie Anders of io9 wrote "This movie outsources its biggest moments of narrative intensity to random YouTube vids, which is a filmic choice so incomprehensible, I'm tempted to interpret it as some kind of grand statement of Dada anti-meaning." Genevieve Kosky of Vox wrote that the movie "not only fails resoundingly as a film, but also fails as a nostalgia piece — which, honestly, might be the greater sin in today’s pop cultureverse", and opined that it should have been more like 2001's adaptation of Josie and the Pussycats. Scott Tobias of National Public Radio concurred, writing "Few critics gave Josie enough credit for cleverly subverting the teen-pop musical, but Jem preys so rapaciously on its target demographic that it holds the virtues of the earlier film in sharp relief. Jem and the Holograms is Mac and Me to Josie and the Pussycats' E.T.".

Geoff Berkshire of Variety praised Peeples' performance, noting that she "keeps the film watchable", as well as Lewis as "a nonsensical bitch-on-wheels caricature with offbeat line readings and live-wire energy", and noted that "a generally unremarkable tech package — cinematography, sound, costuming & makeup, etc. — at least provides a modest showcase for costume designer Soyon An, makeup head Mary Klimek and hairstylist Vanessa Price, who come the closest to channeling the vibrant spirit of the Jem cartoons that originally made fans fall in love."

Matt Zoller Seitz, editor-in-chief of RogerEbert.com, gave 3 out of 4 stars, stating that the film "is one of the weirdest big screen adaptations of a cheap TV cartoon that I've seen", giving his observation that the film even sometimes evokes the films of Terrence Malick, a filmmaker known for his films' lush cinematography and reflective nature. Seitz's overall conclusion is that "[the film is] not a good film in terms of plot or tonal consistency, and it offers almost nothing in the way of true conflict, but it's always an observant and sincere movie, and occasionally a beautiful and deep one."

Glen Heath Jr., writing for Little White Lies, wrote that "If Chu can't quite decide which genre or story to embrace – this version of Jem clumsily mixes rock opera, sci-fi and melodrama – he's in brilliant control of certain moments that merge new technology and classical Hollywood editing... the film doesn't deserve the vitriol lobbed at it by dismissive critics and angry fans. Chu's weird, heartfelt vision has a distinct perspective regarding online wanderlust and understands the vibrancy of color... But most of all it appreciates the tenacious will to be real in a world where everything is an illusion."

=== Contest controversy ===
In March 2014, the film's producers opened an online contest encouraging fans to create short videos describing their love of the original Jem animated series and what a film version would mean to them. The winners were initially to be offered a small role in the film; this was later changed to having the videos themselves featured. In the final production, the fan footage was interspersed with clips of celebrities and edited in such a manner that the fans appeared to be talking about the film's version of the characters. The fans with submitted footage were not informed as to how it would be used; this was perceived as fans being misled into providing positive reviews for a film they had not yet seen, resulting in many being upset by the manipulation of their perspectives on the character and series in light of how unlike the original series the premise of the film was.
