= Raven Moon Entertainment =

American media production company

Raven Moon Entertainment was an American media production company based in Orlando, Florida. It produced children's programming and was most well-known for its Gina D's Kids Club brand, a series of live action and animated videos for children. It also produced 3D animated films.
