= Dawson McAllister =

American talk show host (1946–2020)

- Born: November 14, 1946; New Kensington, Pennsylvania
- Died: December 17, 2020 (aged 74); Nashville, Tennessee
- Occupation(s): Radio Host, Speaker, Author
- Spouse: Ruth Hill Fulton

Dawson McAllister (November 14, 1946 – December 17, 2020) was an American speaker, radio host, and author. He was the host of the radio program Dawson McAllister Live on Sunday nights from 10:00pm–2:00 am ET, which had an average audience of 500,000 listeners a week. Up until his death, McAllister had developed another version of his call-in show, Dawson McAllister Live! and a topic-driven podcast.

He died December 17, 2020, at Vanderbilt Medical Center after being treated for heart problems.

== Public speaking, writing, and youth ministry ==
After his 1968 graduation from Bethel College in Minnesota, McAllister began studies at Talbot School of Theology in Los Angeles. During this time, he accepted a position as a part-time youth pastor at Reseda Baptist Church, where he began speaking to teenagers. Soon after, McAllister began to receive local and national speaking invitations.

In 1973, McAllister created a 13-episode TV series. Developed for markets in the southwest United States, it was designed to present biblically-based counsel to teenagers who did not go to church, or who had stopped attending church. Two years later, he wrote and published the first of 18 youth ministry manuals. That same year, the first Dawson McAllister student conference, based on his Discussion Manual for Student Relationships, was held. Hundreds of thousands of teenagers attended these conferences over the years. Young worship leaders like Chris Tomlin, Todd Proctor, Jeffrey Dean Smith, Joel Engle and Al Denson got their start at McAllister's conferences, along with speakers like Mark Matlock.

In 1988, McAllister began his ongoing partnership with crisis counseling organizations and trained counselors, who began attending his conferences to support teenagers in crisis.

== Broadcast and online ministries ==
McAllister's call-in talk radio show Dawson McAllister Live! had its inaugural broadcast in 1991. Three years later, it was named Talk Show of the Year by the National Religious Broadcasters.

In January 2005, the Top 40 version of Dawson McAllister Live! signed on with its first affiliate station, KJYO in Oklahoma City. Eventually, more than 140 stations would air the show with a weekly audience of over 1 million listeners.

TheHopeLine with Dawson McAllister radio program was launched in partnership with Way Media Network, and was eventually syndicated on 109 stations. In 2010, TheHopeLine stopped referring callers to Christian gay conversion therapy organization Exodus International after pressure from producer Clear Channel. In 2012, McAllister launched Dawson 24/7, his first of two 24/7 streaming internet radio webcasts.

McAllister and his team made the move to a fully web-based ministry in 2017 in an effort to reach as many teenagers and young adults as possible. His website, TheHopeLine.com, includes streaming radio, podcasts, social media, blogs, stories, videos, eBooks, online chat and mentoring, referrals to support groups and counseling organizations, and other digital resources. ThePrayerZone.com, also a part of McAllister's ministry, allows people to offer prayer for struggling teens and young adults, and people in need of prayer to make prayer requests.

== Works ==
- A Walk with Christ to the Cross: The Last Fourteen Hours of His Earthly Mission (2009)
- Saving the Millennial Generation: New Ways to Reach the Kids You Care (1999)
- Como Saber Si Esta Verdaderamente Enamorado/How to Know If You're Really in Love (1996)
- How to Know If You're Really in Love (1993)
- Please Don't Tell My Parents (1992)
- The Great War: God, Satan and You: A Spiritual Warfare Discussion (1991)
- The Search for Significance: Youth Discussion Manual (1990)
- Self Esteem and Loneliness (1989) ISBN 0-923417-02-8

== Dawson McAllister Association ==
McAllister's nonprofit, the Dawson McAllister Association, funds the creation and distribution of the resources and media he provided to support teenagers and young adults in difficult life situations. It has been in operation for more than 40 years as a 501(c)3 organization.

== Personal life ==
In 1977, McAllister married Ruth Hill. They had two sons. On December 17, 2020, Dawson died from cardiac complications at Vanderbilt Medical Center in Nashville, Tennessee.

== Education ==
McAllister attended Bethel College in Minnesota for undergraduate work where he graduated in 1968 and began graduate studies at Talbot School of Theology in California. He also had an honorary doctorate from Biola University.
