= The Swiss Family Robinson (1975 TV series) =

1975 American television series

- Also known as: Island of Adventure
- Genre: Action-adventure
- Written by: Anthony Lawrence; John Meredyth Lucas; William Welch
- Directed by: Christian I. Nyby II; Leslie H. Martinson
- Starring: Martin Milner; Pat Delaney; Willie Aames; Eric Olson; Helen Hunt; Cameron Mitchell
- Composer: Richard LaSalle
- Country of origin: United States
- Original language: English
- No. of seasons: 1
- No. of episodes: 20

Production
- Producer: Irwin Allen
- Cinematography: Fred Jackman, Jr.
- Camera setup: Single-camera
- Running time: 48 mins.
- Production company: 20th Century Fox Television

Original release
- Network: ABC
- Release: September 14, 1975 – April 11, 1976

The Swiss Family Robinson is an American action and adventure series that aired on ABC from September 14, 1975 to April 11, 1976. The two-hour pilot for the series was first shown on April 15, 1975. Based upon the 1812 novel The Swiss Family Robinson, the pilot and its 20 subsequent episodes of the series were produced by Irwin Allen, who had earlier produced a futuristic adaptation of the same novel in the 1965 TV series Lost in Space.

== Synopsis ==
The series starred Martin Milner as Karl Robinson, the survivor of a shipwreck who found himself, his wife and two sons stranded on a volcanic island. In one of her first acting performances, Helen Hunt co-starred as a young girl who was stranded on the island from the same shipwreck and who was taken in by the Robinson family. Befriending the Robinsons was Jeremiah Worth (played by Cameron Mitchell), a sailor who had survived on the island alone for seven years following an earlier shipwreck.

The series was initially scheduled opposite NBC's Wonderful World of Disney and CBS' Three for the Road. In December 1975, CBS replaced Three for the Road with 60 Minutes which soon became a popular Sunday night staple. In addition to the tough competition, The Swiss Family Robinson was preempted several times and showed repeat episodes four times during its short run. The final original episode was telecast on April 4, 1976.

Because the Canadian series of the same name had come first, this was shown in Britain and other international territories as Island of Adventure.

== Cast ==
- Martin Milner as Karl Robinson
- Pat Delaney as Lotte Robinson
- Willie Aames as Fred Robinson
- Eric Olson as Ernie Robinson
- Helen Hunt as Helga Wagner
- Cameron Mitchell as Jeremiah Worth

== Episodes ==
No.	Title	Original release date
1	"The Typhoon"	September 14, 1975
2	"The Hawk"	September 21, 1975
3	"The Mountain"	September 28, 1975
4	"Man O' War"	October 5, 1975
5	"The Slave Ship"	October 12, 1975
6	"The Pit"	October 19, 1975
7	"The Tiki"	October 26, 1975
8	"Neptune's Nephew"	November 2, 1975
9	"The Chimp"	November 9, 1975
10	"The Castaway"	November 16, 1975
11	"The Treasure"	November 23, 1975
12	"The Captain"	November 30, 1975
13	"The Bell"	December 7, 1975
14	"Ernie's Christmas"	December 21, 1975
15	"The Operation"	January 4, 1976
16	"The Renegades"	January 19, 1976
17	"Jean Lafitte: Part 1"	February 1, 1976
18	"Jean Lafitte: Part 2"	February 8, 1976
19	"The Devils"	March 28, 1976
20	"Wild Dog"	April 11, 1976

== Production notes ==
This series was directed by Leslie H. Martinson and Christian I. Nyby II. The second unit director was Stan Jolley. The story editing was done by William Welch, the cinematography was by Fred Jackman, Jr., and the original music was by Richard LaSalle.
