= Yancy (musician) =

American Christian musician (born 1980)

- Also known as: Yancy Wideman Richmond
- Born: Yancy LaDelle Wideman; July 16, 1980 (age 46); Mississippi
- Origin: Tulsa, Oklahoma
- Genres: Worship, Christian pop, pop rock
- Occupations: Singer, songwriter
- Instrument: vocals
- Years active: 1997–present
- Website: yancyministries.com

Yancy Wideman Richmond (born July 16, 1980) is an American Christian musician, who plays worship and Christian pop music mainly focused towards a children's audience.

== Early life ==
Yancy was born Yancy LaDelle Wideman, on July 16, 1980, in Mississippi, to Jim and Julie Wideman (née, Spencer). She has a younger sister, and grew up in Tulsa, Oklahoma.

== Career ==
Her music recording career began in 1997, while she has since released a number of albums, with four of them getting reviews. They are Rock-N-Happy Heart (2008), Stars, Guitars & Megaphone Dreams (2010), Roots for the Journey (2013), and Little Praise Party: Taste and See (2014).

== Personal life ==
She is married to Cory Richmond, and together they reside in Tennessee, with their children.

== Discography ==
=== Albums ===
- Big Weather Change (1997)
- Adeline Street (2002)
- Beautiful Sound (2004)
- Rock-N-Happy Heart (2008)
- Stars, Guitars & Megaphone Dreams (2010)
- Roots for the Journey (2013)
- Little Praise Party: Taste and See (2014, with Friends)
