= Gina D's Kids Club =

American educational children's television program

- Genre: Children's television series Educational; Preschool
- Starring: Gina Mourey
- Opening theme: "Let's All Go to Gina D's"
- Country of origin: United States
- Original language: English
- No. of seasons: 2
- No. of episodes: 30

Production
- Running time: 30 minutes
- Production companies: Raven Moon Entertainment; MG Studios

Original release
- Network: Syndication
- Release: September 6, 2004 – May 19, 2008

Gina D's Kids Club is an American educational children's television series broadcast on selected stations and networks. It is seen across the U.S. on Trinity Broadcasting Network (TBN) and its digital subchannel Smile. It can also be seen on selected local stations. Gina Mourey played Gina D herself. The other characters have been played by Tim Trombitas, Austin Blay, and Joel Simser.

Gina D's Kids Club is geared towards preschoolers from 2 to 6 years old and explores such topics as colors, shapes, and other subjects.

== Episodes ==
=== Series overview ===
Season	Episodes	Originally released	
Season	Episodes	First released	Last released
1	17	September 6, 2004	March 15, 2005
2	13	September 25, 2006	April 20, 2007
3	2	December 7, 2004	May 19, 2008

=== Season 1 (2004–2005) ===
No. overall	No. in season	Title	Original release date
1	1	"Clouds, Stars and Sunshine"	September 6, 2004
2	2	"Imagination"	September 7, 2004
Gina D turns her clubhouse into a magical pretend world of fantasy and fun for viewers at home. Birdie and Hammy use their imagination, to turn the living room couch into an airplane, the BOBO Blocks go on an imaginary train ride to visit letters in the alphabet, and Mr. Pockets leads an imaginary band of instruments that has everyone laughing. Throughout the show, Gina and the characters imagine what it's like to be in a variety of professions, in a marching band, or even a fish! Gina introduces a host of new original songs including "Imagine If", and "Bedtime Stories".
3	3	"Good News"	September 8, 2004
Gina D and her clubhouse friends emphasise the importance of kindness and sharing with others. This positive behavior is reinforced throughout the program in character skits. Gina appears in an animated feature delivering The Good News Gazette door to door, Simon Wannabe organises a Good News Party with the Cuddle Bugs and neighborhood children, Pierre D'Artiste paints Good News Party invitations, and Miss Millie Muffin makes peanut butter and jelly Good News roll-ups in the kitchen. Original soundtracks include "Do the Cuddle Bug", "Spread a Little Good News", and "Kindness".
4	4	"Sing-a-Song Day"	September 9, 2004
Simon is helping Gina D clean out the clubhouse toy chest when he finds a music box that was a special gift from Gina's grandmother in England. For Gina, it's a reminder of her childhood visits when she would listen to Grandma sing songs that brought her comfort and joy. Simon, Hammy, Fishy, and the others all begin to make that same comparison with songs that Gina sang to them. Songs include "Sing Children Sing", "Spread a Little Good News", "Que Pasa - The Playtime Song" and more.
5	5	"Helping Hand"	September 10, 2004
Clubhouse puppets Birdie and Kitty refuse to help each other, creating an opportunity for Gina D to teach little viewers about the importance of being courteous. Simon and Gina demonstrate how to make a helping hands clothesline during the arts and crafts segment, Miss Millie Muffin makes cookies that look like little hands for her helping hands rap song, and Gina and Hammy emphasise the importance of being a caring friend. Throughout the show Gina and TV Ted sing new original songs supporting the program theme including the "Helping Hands Song", and "It's Nice to Be Nice".
6	6	"TV Ted's Birthday"	September 13, 2004
Let's Party! Gina D's animated clubhouse friend TV Ted has a birthday and she wants everyone to be a part of the celebration. She sings a variety of original songs like "Birthdays", "Let's Have a Party", "Blow Out the Candles", and more. Meanwhile Mr. Pockets creates funny things out of balloons, Simon helps teach kids how to make their own party hats out of paper plates, and Miss Muffin makes the TV Ted birthday cake while singing a rap song. The show ends with all the neighborhood kids attending TV Ted's birthday party.
7	7	"Playtime"	September 14, 2004
In this lively episode, Gina D gets everyone at home ready for playtime at the Kids Club with a new set of musical treats, games, and even new Kids Club characters called The Cuddle Bugs. The show is filled with games and songs featuring Gina, Simon and the neighborhood kids. TV Ted takes everyone on a train ride while singing "The Train Song" and Miss Muffin cooks up the laughs with her rendition of how to spell words using a cookie alphabet. A new set of original soundtracks include "Que Pasa", "Patti Cake", and "Hide & Seek".
8	8	"Visit the Doctor"	September 15, 2004
Hammy is not feeling well and he is fearful about going to the doctor. (Reactions similar to those experienced by children ages 3-5) Gina D, Simon and the rest of his Kids Club friends, help calm the fear of the unknown by pretending they are doctors and in a series of skits. Hammy realises the positive attributes associated with feeling better and going to the doctor. Original songs include "I Always Want to Help You When You're Sick","You're Going to the Doctor", and a song called "V.I.P" featuring Gina D and her animated back-up singers The Transistor Sisters.
9	9	"Scrapbook Day"	September 16, 2004
Hammy, Birdie and Kitty are full of questions about scrapbooks. What is a scrapbook? Why should anyone make one? Gina D and Simon answer puppet questions by creating a Kids Club scrapbook of their own and Gina gets everyone involved in the project. Pierre D'Artiste helps to design and color the cover, Simon gathers pictures from the attic, and Miss Millie Muffin makes some 'picture perfect' treats. As Gina and her friends reminisce about special moments displayed in each scrapbook picture, the picture transitions into a video clip from that show. Music videos include the original songs "Shake", and "Colors".
10	10	"Shapes and Sizes"	September 17, 2004
Gina D and the clubhouse puppets introduce young viewers to the many shapes and sizes of the objects inside the clubhouse. They reinforce how these objects each resemble a circle, triangle, or a square. Throughout the show, Kids Club characters reinforce that theme with an assortment of set-ups. Mr. Pockets does an interactive segment with viewers to identify graphic shapes and sizes he magically pulls from his many pockets, Pierre D'Artiste colors them, and Miss Millie Muffin turns them into cookies. Getting yourself in shape also becomes a part of the show with Gina D and the Transistor Sisters singing a song called "Spin It". They encourage viewers to stay fit and ask them join in on a low-key exercise using circular arm and body movements. Some of the featured songs are "Shapes", "How Big is Big", and "Circle of Love".
11	11	"Join the Club"	September 20, 2004
Gina D makes sure little viewers get the message as she gently instructs them on the individual gifts and talents that make each of us special. An animated segment with a boy and girl looking in the mirror compares their special features, and TV Ted takes us to a pre-school class to watch children display their individual talents in a sing-a-long and Miss Millie Muffin bakes cookies that look like TV Ted, Hammy, Birdie, and Fishy then incorporates simple arithmetic into a clever rap song called "Counting Cookies". Other original soundtracks include inspirational songs that encourage positive reinforcement like "Believe in Your Dreams", and "Special Person".
12	12	"Let's Go to the Zoo"	September 21, 2004
Kitty, Birdie, and Fishy take center stage with Gina D to entertain and teach young viewers about different animals at the zoo and household pets. TV Ted, Doggie Brown, and the neighborhood children are featured in a music video around the song "Let's All Bark Like Doggie Brown", while Simon, Mr. Pockets, and Pierre each present an interactive segment to identify specific animals from Zebra's to Kangaroos. In the Kids Club kitchen, Miss Muffin makes animal cookies and associated animal sounds in a special song. Original soundtracks include "How'd You Like to Be a Monkey", "Zebra's Have Stripes", and "Hop Like a Kangaroo".
13	13	"Smile-Ability"	September 22, 2004
Gina D reminds her friends at home that you're not dressed until you have your smile on, and the clubhouse characters each demonstrate ways to reinforce the message. Pierre D'Artiste paints a picture of frowns that turn into happy faces, Mr. Pockets takes us on a BOBO Blocks animated train ride to find the letters that spell the word s-m-i-l-e and TV Ted takes viewers to the playground for a special "The A-B-C Song". Miss Muffin finishes the day by making happy face cookies, then singing a song about them in the Kids Club kitchen. Original music includes "Smile-ability", "The A-B-C Song", "Have a Good Day", and "Sing Children Sing".
14	14	"Animal Alphabet"	March 10, 2005
Clubhouse character TV Ted introduces a game for Gina D, Simon, and young viewers at home. He shows them a letter and several different animals. The game is to match the letter with the first letter in an animal's name, reinforcing letters, sounds, and memory. Gina sings a variety of original songs about animals including: "How'd You Like to Be a Monkey", "Hop Like a Kangaroo", and "Zebra's Have Stripes". Miss Millie Muffin makes her famous cheese kite snacks, Mr. Pockets directs the Barnyard Band, and the 3-D animated BOBO Blocks take young viewers on a journey to Farmer Al's Farm for a special animal song.
15	15	"Let's Get Fit"	March 11, 2005
Gina D and the Clubhouse Kids encourage everyone to get fit and shape up as they participate in simple exercises. Children have fun while learning an early lesson about the positive benefits of good exercise and good food. In a series of skits with the characters, young viewers are invited to copy specific arm and leg movements and to join the Kids Club characters in moving exercises like hopping, skipping and jumping. Pierre D' Artiste paints and colors the good vegetables to eat, Miss Millie Muffin makes a nutritious treat called "apple shakers" and The Transistor Sisters appear for a special "Let's Get Fit" exercise finale song. Additional songs include: "Always Eat Right", "Walking", and "1-2-3 Jump Like Me!".
16	16	"Journey to the Land of Dinosaurs"	March 14, 2005
17	17	"Let's Fix TV Ted"	March 15, 2005

=== Season 2 (2006–2007) ===
No. overall	No. in season	Title	Original release date
18	1	"Good Manners"	September 25, 2006
19	2	"Reach for the Stars"	September 26, 2006
Gina D and the clubhouse characters discuss new things they would like to learn and be able to accomplish. Simon wants to learn how to juggle, but doubt, low self-esteem and an "I can't" attitude, keep him from believing in his dream. Gina and the other characters encourage him to overcome the negative thoughts and work toward accomplishing his goals to be successful. Original songs by Gina D and the Transistor Sisters include: "You Can Shine", "Reach for the Stars", "You'll Be Great", and "Be Proud of Who You Are".
20	3	"Cuddle Bug Caper"	September 27, 2006
The Cuddle Bugs play a joke on Simon when they hide his hat and leave behind a trail of rhyming riddles. Simon must solve the riddles to find his favorite hat. Gina D helps Simon think through each clue. The answers to the riddles bring back fun memories of the places they've been and the things they have learned together. The program contains seven original songs including Miss Millie Muffin's, "Sunshine Cookies".
21	4	"Journey to the Land of Dino-Bugs"	September 28, 2006
22	5	"Rhymin' Simon"	September 29, 2006
Gina D and Simon are cleaning out the Kids Club toy box while they play a rhyming game. As Gina holds up a toy, Simon tries to select a word that rhymes with the toy. The words also lead to related songs and music videos throughout the show and entertaining appearances by TV Ted, Miss Mille Muffin, Mr. Pockets and Pierre D'Artiste. Original songs include: "To Be a Fish", "Have a Good Day", "Rainbows" and more.
23	6	"Under the Sea"	October 2, 2006
Fishy gets a letter from a fish friend from the Great Barrier Reef that inspires Gina D and the clubhouse gang to learn more about life under the sea. They build a cardboard aquarium to display some of the fish and mammals that live in the water. Pierre D'Artiste paints some fish while singing about "The Fish Lesson", and Miss Millie Muffin makes tuna sandwiches to a song called "Fish is Brain Food". The program features seven original songs including: "To Be a Fish", "Turtles, Dolphins, Seals & Whales", and the title cut "Life Under the Sea".
24	7	"Learn to Read"	October 3, 2006
Gina's Grandmother sends Hammy a storybook with words under the pictures. Up until now Hammy has only seen picture books. Gina and the cast discuss and demonstrate the link between sounds and letters, and how letters make words, words make sentences, and sentences make a story. Seven original songs include: "Learn to Read", "Letters Have Sounds" and "Books Can Take You Anywhere".
25	8	"Learn to Count"	October 4, 2006
26	9	"Puppet Friends"	April 16, 2007
27	10	"Safety First"	April 17, 2007
Gina and the Kids Club cast teach young viewers how to think about safety inside and outside the home. The program provides information about 9-1-1, and being safe around the house, or crossing the street for school. A special on-location segment features a visit to a firehouse and how to stop, drop, and roll if our clothes catch fire by accident. Six new original safety songs include: "Safety Comes First", "Look Both Ways", and "Ask First".
28	11	"What's That Sound?"	April 18, 2007
Simon invents a machine called the Sound-A-Rama 6000 that can make all kinds of sounds, so Gina and her clubhouse friends create a game called "What's That Sound". They identify sounds inside and outside the clubhouse with help from young viewers at home. The Cuddle Bugs help create musical instruments with household items, Pierre D' Artiste paints musical instruments that make high and low sounds, and Gina sings a host of new songs including: "Sounds Are All Around Us", "Loud Sounds / Quiet Sounds", and "Sounds of the World".
29	12	"Sharing"	April 19, 2007
Gina's Grandmother sends her a special cookie in the mail. Simon wants one too but there is only one, giving Gina the opportunity to explain and demonstrate the importance of sharing with others. A series of character segments with Pierre D'Artiste, Miss Millie Muffin, and Mr. Pockets, reinforce the sharing theme, along with seven original songs that include: "Sharing is Caring", "Don't Forget to Say Please", and "Always Be Courteous".
30	13	"Sunrise, Sunset"	April 20, 2007
Gina and the clubhouse characters introduce preschoolers to a daily routine of tasks and events that are part of a normal daily routine in the morning, afternoon, and night. Mr. Pockets performs a walk through the day, and Pierre sings about the clock on the wall. Additional clubhouse songs include: "Sunshine", "Bedtime Stories", and "The Big Dipper".

=== Specials (2004–2008) ===
No. overall	No. in season	Title	Original release date
31	1	"Gina D's Cuddle Bug Christmas"	December 7, 2004
32	2	"Sing Along with Gina D"	May 19, 2008
A compilation of music videos from the "Gina D's Kids Club" series.

== Production ==
The series started pre-production in 2001 and had a budget of $1.8 million.
