= Joel Engle =

- Born: June 3, 1968 (age 58)
- Occupations: Author; pastor; former Christian recording artist

Joel Engle (born June 3, 1968) is an American author, pastor, and former Christian recording artist. He recorded the number one song "Shadow of Your Cross" and the top 10 songs "Louder Than The Angels," "Be A Father To Her," and "I Believe In You." Engle also wrote several popular worship songs including "I Bow Down" and "You Are The Holy One."

== Early life ==
As a young boy growing up in San Francisco, Joel Engle never knew his father. Tragedy struck when, at the age of 11, Joel found his mother lying on the kitchen floor after suffering a stroke. She died soon after, leaving Joel in the care of his elderly grandparents in Wetumka, Oklahoma. Just three years later there was even more upheaval when Joel's grandfather died and his grandmother went to live in a retirement home. At the age of 14, Joel was placed in the Baptist Children's Home in Moore, Oklahoma. Engle was adopted by Dale and Nadine Engle of Garber, Oklahoma, at age 16.

== Education ==
Engle went on to study music and theology on scholarship at Oklahoma Baptist University. While there, he met and eventually married his wife Valerie.

== Career ==
After college, Engle toured with Dawson McAllister student conferences for three years, playing in front of crowds upward of 500,000 per year.

In 1997, Joel and wife Valerie, started Spin360, a modern worship resource that provided worship leaders with songs, chord charts, sheet music, and other tools. This ministry served over 12,000 churches worldwide. Joel's piano and vocal talents were also simultaneously being put to good use with many camp dates, conferences, and outreach opportunities with the Billy Graham Association, Fellowship of Christian Athletes, and Student Life. Joel has shared the stage with GMA Dove Award winners Casting Crowns, TobyMac, Rebecca St. James, Third Day, MercyMe, and others.

== Author ==
In 2006, Engle signed a publishing contract with LifeWay Publishing. He released The Exchange: Tired Of Living the Christian Life On Your Own.

In 2010, Engle released The Father I Never Had through Lucid Publishing.

== Awards ==
In 2012, Engle received the Performance In Excellence award from his alma mater Oklahoma Baptist University.

== Pastoral Ministry ==
In 2008, Engle founded The Exchange Church, which operated in the Alliance area of far north Fort Worth, Texas, until its closing in 2020. Engle transitioned from his position as pastor at The Exchange in 2013 to ChangePoint Church, a megachurch in Anchorage, Alaska. There, he became the Pastor of Preaching and Vision.

In January 2015, Engle spoke at Liberty University's Convocation held in Vines Center.

In 2020, Engle relocated back to the contiguous United States and became the lead pastor at Fusion Bible Church in Durant, Oklahoma. Engle announced he had left his position at Fusion Bible Church in 2021.

Joel Engle is the current pastor of First Baptist Church Newnan, Georgia.

== Discography ==
- One Day Praise (1993)
- Surrender (1999)
- Nothing Left Of Me (2001)
- Louder Than The Angels (2002)
- Made for Worship (2005)
- I Believe in You (2007)
- Nothing Left of Me
- Ultimate Worship Collection - 3 CDs
