= Bugtime Adventures =

American animated television series

- Genre: Animation, Christian, children
- Narrated by: Willie Aames
- Country of origin: United States
- Original language: English
- No. of seasons: 1
- No. of episodes: 13

Original release
- Network: TBN
- Release: 2003

Bugtime Adventures is an American children's animated series that began airing in 2003. 13 episodes were produced, to air on Christian TV stations like TBN.

The entire series is also available on DVD.

== Synopsis ==
Bugtime Adventures interleaves historical events described in the Bible with fictional stories of a community of bugs who live nearby in Bugglesville. The bugs' story overlaps with the Biblical human story — for example, in the first episode, "Blessing in Disguise", Iggy the wild bee crashlands on the back of Joseph, who is struggling with emotions of forgiveness and revenge. Iggy's awareness of Joseph's story helps him to solve his own problems in Bugglesville.

The show was produced by Lightning Bug Flix in association with Kim's Ani Communications (Kim's Ani Comm) and Santa Fe Communications, and animated by Starburst Animation Studio in Seoul, South Korea.

== Episodes ==
Generally, the real Bible event is paralleled in some way by the fictional bug story. 13 episodes were produced:

1. "Blessing in Disguise" - The Joseph Story. Both Joseph and Antoni have to make a choice between revenge or forgiveness.
2. "A Giant Problem" - The David Story. David's courage facing Goliath inspires Megan to fix the leaking dam.
3. "Against the Wall" - The Rahab Story. The Hebrews and the bugs face obstacles on their paths.
4. "You're All Wet" - The Elijah Story. A drought affects the Hebrews and the bugs.
5. "Construction Woes" – The Tower of Babel Story. Nimrod starts building the tower of Babel, while the bugs have a project of their own.
6. "Not to Bee" – The Esther Story. Haman tricks the king into agreeing to kill the Israelites, while Megan rescues a bee who plans to destroy Bugglesville.
7. "A Lot to Swallow" - The Jonah Story. The ants wind up with Jonah inside the whale.
8. "It's the Pits" - The Daniel Story. The bugs are inspired by Daniel's courage in the lions' den.
9. "What"s a Manna with You?" - The Story of Moses and Manna from Heaven. The Hebrews ask Moses for something to eat, but are disappointed by the manna.
10. "Joy to the World" - The Christmas Story. The bugs witness the birth of Jesus Christ.
11. "Riding for a Fall" - The Story of Elisha healing Naaman. Naaman doesn't want to follow Elisha's instructions for curing his leprosy.
12. "Keep the Trust" - The Story of Samson and Delilah. Samson fails to keep the secret of his strength, while Antoni the ant fails to keep Gina's secret.
13. "Scare Tactics" - The Story of Gideon vs. the Midianites. Gideon is apprehensive about leading the Hebrews in battle against the Midianites, while the bugs are afraid to fight a scorpion who's taken over their town.

== Broadcast ==
The show aired on the Smile network until 2020.

Internationally, the show has also aired in the United Kingdom, South Korea, Poland and Taiwan. It was also broadcast on the Australian Christian Channel in Australia and Light TV in the Philippines.

The show also aired on EWTN.
