= Mary Rice Hopkins =

American musical artist (born 1956)

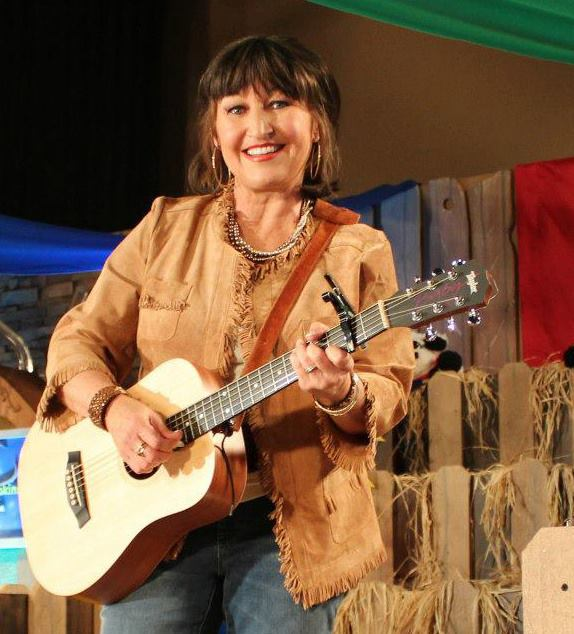

Background information
- Genres: Christian, Children
- Instruments: Vocals, guitar, fiddle
- Labels: Big Steps 4 U, administered by Music Services
- Website: www.maryricehopkins.com

Mary Rice Hopkins is an American children's and Christian religious artist born September 6, 1956, who has written hundreds of songs for children and adults. She currently lives in Southern California.

Hopkins has been in the music ministry for over 30 years and has over twenty albums. She was influenced musically by her parents and brothers. Her brothers originated the country-gospel band Brush Arbor, which won the Academy of Country Music award for Vocal Group of the Year in 1974. With Wendy Hofheimer, she recorded three albums as "Wendy & Mary" for Sparrow Records.

Hopkins has also written several children's books, as well as curriculum books that accompany her albums. Her distributor is Big Steps 4 U. According to her web site, she uses her music and ministry to share God's love and spread the good news of the gospel of Jesus Christ. In 1997, she received a lifetime achievement award from Point Loma Nazarene University, where she studied communications and Christian education.

In 2005, Hopkins teamed up with puppeteer Darcie Maze. Together they travel the country doing concerts. They also have a television show on the TBN network and the Smile of a Child network entitled, Mary Rice Hopkins and Puppets with a Heart. The episodes incorporate the use of puppetry, music, and Scripture to speak to children about relevant life issues. A DVD that contains two of the show's episodes has received the Dove Foundation Seal of Approval and the show itself received a Parent's Television Council Seal of Approval.

== Albums ==
- Come Meet Jesus (1990)
- Good Buddies (1991)
- Lighthouse (1992)
- Mary Christmas: A Family Christmas Album (1993)
- In My Garden (1995)
- 15 Singable Songs For The Young At Heart (1997)
- Juggling Mom (1999)
- In The Beginning (1999)
- Workmanship (2000)
- Miracle Mud (2000)
- Come On Home (2002)
- Sing Through The Year (2004)
- Canciones Para Toda La Familia (2007)
- A Very Mary Christmas (2007)
- Sleep Little One: Lullabies For Children and Grown-Ups (2009)
- Get On Board! (2009)
- Dancing in the Desert (2010)
- Dream Big Dreams (2022)
