= The Gospel Bill Show =

- Title card for the show.
- Created by: Willie George
- Starring: Willie George; Ken Blount; Jeff Merrill (1986–1993); Lana Osborn; Daine Demaree (until 1989); John Witty (1989–1993)
- Country of origin: United States
- No. of episodes: 65

Production
- Executive producer: Willie George
- Running time: 30 minutes

Original release
- Network: Syndicated
- Release: June 4, 1981 – May 12, 1993

The Gospel Bill Show is a Christian-values based television show that was produced by Willie George Ministries from June 4, 1981 to May 12, 1993. (Later episodes were titled as Adventures in Dry Gulch but featured the same characters and premise.)

During its main run it was broadcast on the CBN and TBN networks. It is currently seen in syndication on the Daystar and Smile of a Child networks, and on other small independent Christian television stations.

It was also broadcast on the Australian Christian Channel in Australia.

== Characters ==
- Gospel Bill (Willie George) – the sheriff of Dry Gulch. Bill serves both as representative of the law and as moral guidance counselor to the citizens of Dry Gulch.
- Nicodemus (Ken Blount) – deputy and sidekick of Gospel Bill, also the foreman at a local ranch. Nicodemus was once a drunk of ill-repute who was sobered up by Bill and reaffirmed as a born-again Christian. Nicodemus is easily swayed by various shysters, but Gospel Bill serves as his moral compass when temptations arise.
- Miss Lana (Lana Osborn) – runs the town's general store, which doubles as a telegraph office. She serves as the town's maternal figure, although in the series she is not known to have any husband or children.
- Elmer Barnes (Jeff Merrill) – a citizen of Dry Gulch who is friends with the main characters. He is portrayed as somewhat mentally challenged and is often confused on Biblical matters. He has two pet worms, Inky and Dinky (which he often carries on his person, though they are largely unseen characters) and his primary concern is "goin' fishin'".
- Theodore Ulysses (T. U.) Tutwater (Daine Demaree) – the mayor of Dry Gulch as well as the president of the Dry Gulch Bank and Trust. He represented secular interests (such as pride and greed) and usually mocked Gospel Bill's religious views, though he would not engage in illegal acts. In later episodes, Demaree (who moved to California to pastor a church) was replaced by John Witty and the character's name was changed to T. W. Tutwater.
- Luther Bedlow (also played by Willie George, but credited as "himself") – the stock villain of the show. He usually attempts to engage in criminal activity but is always foiled by Gospel Bill.
- Orville Cornpone (Rodney Lynch) – served in early episodes as Bedlow's dim-witted henchman who would usually cause Bedlow to be unsuccessful in his criminal activities. Cornpone later became a Christian (courtesy of Gospel Bill) and thereafter played a morally upstanding character (though Bedlow would attempt to recruit him back to villainy).
- Wichita Slim (Kenneth Copeland) – a tough as nails, but gentlemanly U.S. Marshall who comes through town and helps with the most difficult problems they occasionally face.
- Miss Trudi Lou (Trudi Blount) – a minor character to whom Nicodemus often refers as the woman he hopes to woo someday. (Trudi Blount is Ken Blount's real life wife.)
- Ferman Farnsworth (also played by Willie George; but often credited as "himself") – a minor character (though often referenced) who owns the ranch where Nicodemus works.
- Barkamaeus (Keith Holey) – an anthropomorphic human-sized talking dog who wore a cowboy hat and vest. He only appeared in early episodes of the show.

Before the Elmer Barnes character was introduced, Jeff Merrill appeared on early episodes of the show as a geological surveyor, who advised Luther Bedlow of gold deposits to be found underneath Dry Gulch.

John Witty and Rodney Lynch also appeared as the town doctor in several episodes.

== Premise ==
The Gospel Bill Show was set in the fictional town of Dry Gulch, portrayed as being in the Old West. However, there were many anachronistic references to the present day, such as television and answering machine, which did not exist back when the show was supposed to be set. Dry Gulch was so named because the citizens voted it as a "dry" city (i.e., one which prohibited alcohol sales).

== Format ==
The show would center around a topic, where Gospel Bill would be heavily involved in providing moral guidance to one of the citizens (usually Nicodemus or Elmer Barnes) and/or preventing catastrophe (mainly stopping Luther Bedlow's criminal activities).

=== Oogene and Jeannie Mae segments ===
A typical episode would be interrupted several times by puppet segments depicting Biblical stories as well as the adventures of Oogene, a young boy who squabbles with his sister Jeannie Mae (but the fights are always resolved by a moral lesson) and narrates "Oogene at the Zoo", in which Oogene studies an animal and relates its role to a lesson from the Bible ("Oogene at the Farm" replaced the "Oogene at the Zoo" segment in some later episodes). Segments with Oogene and Jeannie tend to be unique, but the zoo and farm field pieces are repeated frequently throughout the series as filler for the show. Willie George voiced the majority of the various puppet skits, most notably Oogene and his sister Jeannie Mae.

=== Music video and lesson ===
The episode would also feature a Christian song and music video (usually by Ken Blount) towards the end of the show. Sometimes he would appear in character as Nicodemus, but often he will appear as himself, singing about a dramatic story which is acted out by others. Some of the music videos not contributed by Blount included the songs, "We've Got the Power" by long-time KCM worship leader Len Mink and "It's God" by Kellie Copeland Swisher (daughter of Kenneth Copeland), as well as "A Merry Heart" where Blount is joined by unnamed puppets wearing blue and orange-striped shirts. An unknown band was occasionally seen opposite Blount in some later videos.

At the end of most shows, Gospel Bill reappeared with props in hand to spell out a lesson to the viewer, generally relating to the main plot of the episode. He would often use the props as a visual aid to demonstrate a particular concept he is emphasizing. In some later episodes, Nicodemus will give the lesson instead of Gospel Bill.

=== Adventures in Dry Gulch ===
Later episodes of the show were titled as "Adventures in Dry Gulch" rather than "The Gospel Bill Show", many of which did not feature Willie George at all. Instead, Nicodemus would be in charge while Gospel Bill is "out of town" on some unspecified task.

== Home media ==
The series is available for DVD purchase through George's church website. Episodes included in the collection include;

- God Gives Back - Ken Blount: In the Name of Jesus -At the threat of losing her store, Miss Lana chooses to obey God with the tithe and trust Him to provide.
- There's Still Hope - Ken Blount: Know You're a Christian -When Gospel Bill brings a desperate bank robber to justice, Miss Lana believes the robber can be saved when no one else does.
- Power of Agreement - At the Zoo with Oogene: Ostrich - Ken Blount: You Are My Inspiration -A bizarre accident leaves Gospel Bill with amnesia. Nicodemus and Miss Lana respond with the prayer of agreement.
- He Sent His Word and Healed Them - Ken Blount: All Hail King Jesus -Gospel Bill speaks God's Word when a local family is threatened with a contagious disease.
- Don't Trust in Riches - Ken Blount: Worship and Adore Thee -Eager to make a profit, Tutwater loses all of his money in a bad mining investment.
- The Worst Temptation -In an effort to make Gospel Bill leave Dry Gulch, Luther Bedlow and Cornpone try to lure him away with temptations.
- To Cheat or Not, Part 1 -Luther Bedlow uses Cornpone as a pawn in the local sheriff's election, and they buy votes with bribes.
- To Cheat or Not, Part 2 - Ken Blount: You Are My Inspiration -After an unfair election, Gospel Bill must help the new sheriff deal with outlaws and save the day.
- All Things Through Christ - Len Mink: We've Got The Power -Gospel Bill must find a way to reveal a mysterious thief's identity and catch him in the act.
- Praise God When Trouble Comes -Gospel Bill experiences trouble at every turn and has to decide whether he will complain or praise God.
- To Tell the Truth - Ken Blount: Nothing But the Blood -Elmer takes dating advice from Nicodemus, but he stretches the truth in order to make a good impression.
- Receiving by Faith - Ken Blount: You Are My Inspiration -When two outlaws injure Gospel Bill, his friends must pray and stand in faith for his healing.
- It Pays to Work -Elmer needs money, but he fails to display a good work ethic when Miss Lana gives him a job.
- The New Birth -Gospel Bill recounts his lawless days before Christ to show Elmer that Jesus can change anyone.
- The Reward of Stinginess -Tutwater misses out on God's blessing when he allows a stingy spirit to keep him from giving at church.
- The Power of the Tongue -Nicodemus activates the power of God's Word for healing, and Gospel Bill uses the Word to help him outsmart a gunman.
- Treasures in Heaven -Luther Bedlow and Cornpone hear of a treasure, so they kidnap Nicodemus in an effort to find it.
- If God Be for Us -When Gospel Bill heads out of town, Nicodemus is left in charge and learns to conquer his fears.
- Agreement Equals Power -Gospel Bill and Nicodemus believe God for the money Nic needs in order to save his mother's farm.
- Overcoming Faith -Gospel Bill, Nicodemus, Miss Lana, and Elmer all use their faith in order to overcome obstacles in their way.
- Control Your Thoughts - At the Zoo with Oogene: Koala Bear - Ken Blount: Don't Let the Devil Steal Your Joy -Nicodemus and Elmer nearly come to blows when Elmer tries to court Miss Trudi Lou.
- Babies Make Mistakes -After falling back into an old habit, a new Christian learns what it means to persevere in spite of mistakes.
- Elmer Finds His Gift -When faced with growing debts and no job, Elmer discovers his true gift.
- There's No Such Thing As Monsters -Gospel Bill has to set Tutwater straight about a monster story and find the prankster responsible.
- Never Give Up -Fed up with how hard Farnsworth is working him, Nicodemus decides to quit his job.
- Deadly Disobedience - At the Zoo with Oogene: Ostrich - Ken Blount feat. Unnamed Puppets: A Merry Heart -A young boy's life is in jeopardy when he disobeys his mother and falls into a mine shaft.
- Nic and the Faith Saddle -Nicodemus needs a new saddle for a cowboy contest, so Gospel Bill encourages him to believe God for it.
- Rejoice in the Lord -When everything goes wrong with his day, Nicodemus has to choose whether or not he will praise God.
- Angels Watching over Me -In dealing with his fear of the unknown, Elmer finds out that angels are watching over him.
- Put Off Temptation -Luther Bedlow and Tutwater join forces and try to bribe Gospel Bill so he will influence the townspeople.
- The Root of Bitterness -Miss Lana is tempted to become bitter when Tutwater accuses her of selling shoddy merchandise.
- Words of Healing -Gospel Bill speaks words of healing on behalf of his Uncle Pete, but Elmer brings sickness upon himself with a negative confession.
- How to Make Friends - At the Zoo with Oogene: Elephant - Ken Blount: J-E-S-U-S
- Freed from Sin - At the Zoo with Oogene: Orangutan - Ken Blount: In the Name of Jesus
- The Jealous Mistake - At the Zoo with Oogene: Ostrich - Ken Blount: All Hail King Jesus
- The Spirit of Giving - At the Zoo with Oogene: Red Kangaroo - Ken Blount: Forget All Those Things
- The Love of Money - At the Zoo with Oogene: Bengal Tiger - Ken Blount: Joy, Joy, Joy
- The Christmas That Almost Wasn't - At the Zoo with Oogene: Grizzly Bear - Ken Blount: Hark! The Herald Angels Sing
- The Wicked Man's Trap - At the Zoo with Oogene: Jaguar - Ken Blount: Nothing But the Blood
- The Missionary Journey - At the Zoo with Oogene: Animal Zoo Review - Ken Blount: In the Name of Jesus
- Feed Your Spirit - At the Zoo with Oogene: Jaguar - Ken Blount: Fear Not
- Praise Beats Complaining - At the Zoo with Oogene: Ostrich - Ken Blount: Don't Let the Devil Steal Your Joy
- Believe the Best - At the Farm with Oogene: Horse
- Pride Comes Before Trouble - At the Zoo with Oogene: Zebra - Ken Blount: Fear Not
- Honesty - At the Zoo with Oogene: Flamingo - Ken Blount: Nothing But the Blood
- Peer Pressure - At the Zoo with Oogene: Red Kangaroo - Ken Blount: Fear Not
- Gorilla Prank
- The New Man (introducing the Wichita Slim character played by Kenneth Copeland) - At the Zoo with Oogene: Animal Zoo Review - Kellie Copeland: It's God
- By His Stripes - At the Zoo with Oogene: Jaguar - Ken Blount: All Hail King Jesus
- The Fugitive, Part 1 - At the Zoo with Oogene: White Rhinoceros
- The Fugitive, Part 2 - At the Zoo with Oogene: Polar Bear
- Control Your Temper - At the Zoo with Oogene: Bengal Tiger - Ken Blount: In the Name of Jesus

== Spin-offs ==
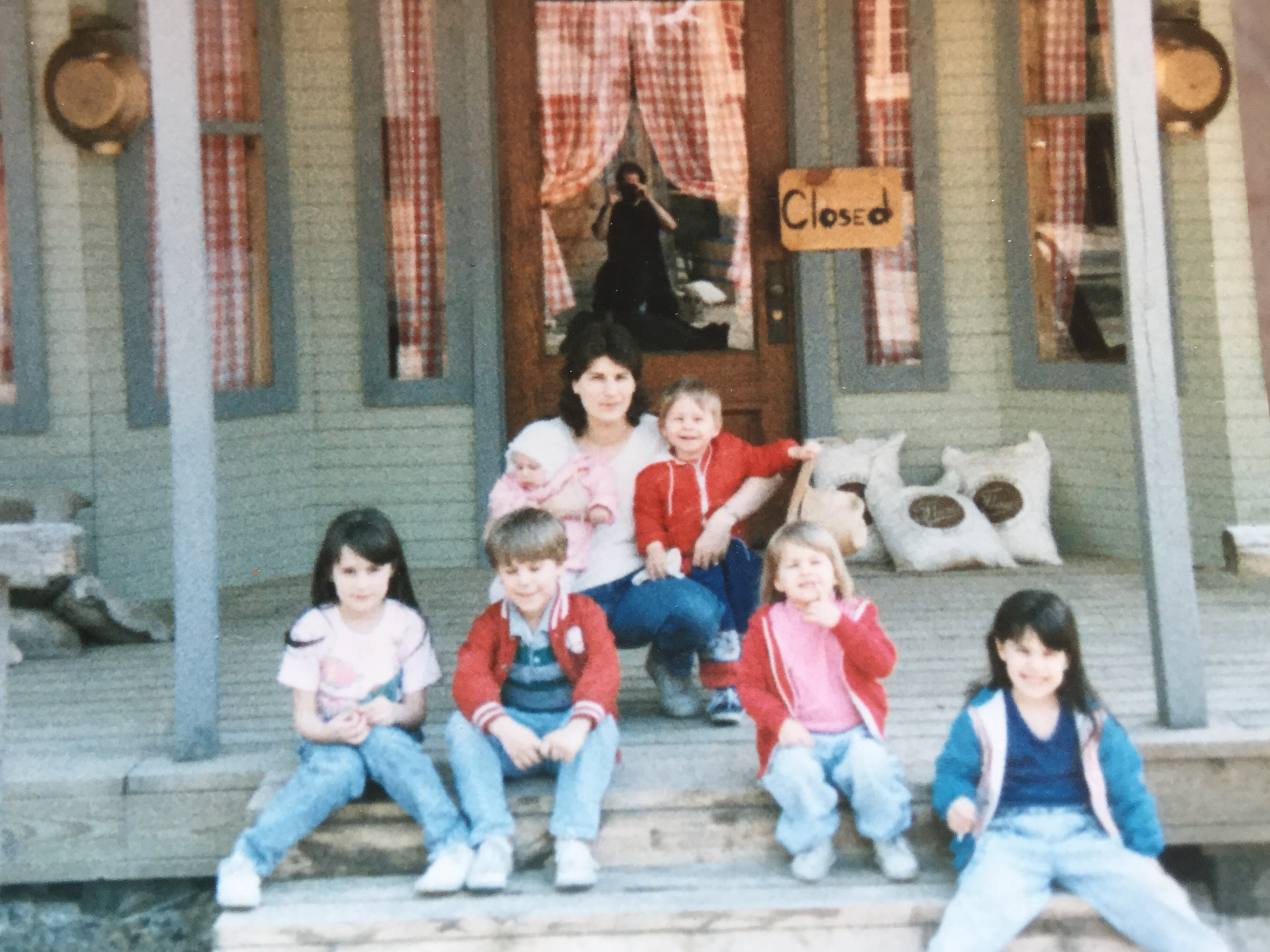
A family visiting Dry Gulch in early 1990s

Willie George Ministries launched three direct-to-video spin-offs of The Gospel Bill show: The Candy Store, Bill Gunter, U.S. Marshal, and The Cimarron Trail.

=== Dry Gulch, U.S.A. ===
Shortly after The Gospel Bill Show first aired, Willie George opened Dry Gulch, U.S.A. (now known as New Life Ranch Frontier Cove) in Adair, Oklahoma, a Western-themed Christian children's summer camp nestled near Lake Hudson with over 1.25 miles of shoreline.

=== Bill Gunter, U.S. Marshal ===
A more traditional western-style program that was shot on location at Dry Gulch, U.S.A. Gospel Bill is renamed Bill Gunter, while the other characters retain their names. Bill Gunter, U.S. Marshal is not as campy as The Gospel Bill Show, and takes itself much more seriously. The show was sold strictly as part of a video club and was sold at Church on the Move later on as well.

Bill Gunter is a United States Marshall in the days of the Oklahoma Indian Territory. Striving to maintain a strong Christian testimony in the midst of lawlessness, Gunter is a role model for children.

=== The Candy Store ===
The Candy Store was a television show that was a tie-in to The Gospel Bill Show that shared some of that show's characters. It was a program for pre-schoolers that featured Miss Lana and Nicodemus as well as a newcomer, Lefty Wright (Jim Wideman).

Characters

- Miss Lana
- Nicodemus
- Elmer Barnes
- Barkimaeus, The Faith Dog
- Lefty Wright
- Miss Trudi Lou
- Wendell, the Woodchuck

Episode Titles

- A: is for Abraham
- B: is For Bible
- C: is for Christ
- D: is for David
- E: is for Esther
- F: is for Faith
- G: is for Grace
- H: is for Heaven
- I: is for You
- J: is for Jesus
- K: is for Kindness
- L: is for Love
- M: is for Miracle
- N: is for Noah
- O: is for Obey
- P: is for Prayer
- Q: is for Queen
- R: is for Rejoice
- S: is for Sickness (Healing)
- T: is for Temple
- U: is for Unbelief
- V: is for Victory
- W: is for Wealth
- XYZ: is the End

=== The Cimarron Trail ===
Contrary to popular belief this show was not a new series but was actually the Bill Gunter U.S. Marshal series renamed. Pastor George had wanted the series to be called this originally but when shooting for the series began it was relayed to him that the name The Cimarron Trail was copyrighted and could not be used for the name. While Pastor George did not like using the name Bill Gunter U.S. Marshall it was the name chosen at the time. Later on towards the end of the series it was found out that the name The Cimarron Trail was not taken or copyrighted so the series was renamed as Pastor Willie George had wanted it to be.

=== The Wichita Slim Trilogy ===
In addition to the aforementioned spin-offs, there were also three related movies. The cast was left mainly intact, but the Gospel Bill/Bill Gunter character was now teamed up with (now U.S. Marshall) Wichita Slim (Kenneth Copeland).

- The Gunslinger, which revolves around a shooting where Wichita Slim is injured and loses his memory, causing him to temporarily revert to his outlaw ways. (This was the only movie in the trilogy to be completed during the show's run)
- Covenant Rider involves the two Marshalls efforts to rescue Bill Gunter's nephew, who was kidnapped by outlaws associated with Saul Gillespe (guest star: fellow televangelist Jesse Duplantis).
- The Treasure of Eagle Mountain concerns a treasure left by a retired (and seriously wounded) lawman to his jaded son, and the efforts to find it. (The name is a reference to Eagle Mountain Lake, located near Copeland's ministry headquarters northwest of Fort Worth, Texas.)

== See also ==
- Fire By Nite (another Christian youth television program from Willie George)
