= Colby's Clubhouse =

- Title card for the show
- Created by: Peter and Hanneke Jacobs
- Starring: Peter Jacobs
- Country of origin: United States
- Original language: English
- No. of seasons: 3
- No. of episodes: 43

Production
- Executive producers: Peter and Hanneke Jacobs
- Running time: 27 minutes

Original release
- Network: Trinity Broadcasting Network; Smile; Australian Christian Channel
- Release: November 19, 1995 – December 31, 2000

Colby's Clubhouse is an American Christian live-action children's television show that teaches principles from the Bible through songs and everyday situations. The main character is Colby, an anthropomorphic computer portrayed as having the entire Bible programmed into his memory. The show was written and produced by Peter and Hanneke Jacobs and was originally aired on Trinity Broadcasting Network, with Peter playing the part of Colby. It originally aired from 1995 to 2000 with several changes of cast members. The first episode aired on November 19, 1995, and it was last aired on December 31, 2000. The show was primarily shot in Orange County, California. On December 30, 2006, the show was removed from TBN, although it remains on the network's Smile of a Child digital subchannel. Albums and videotapes featuring Colby the Computer were produced. However, many of these were produced before the TBN series and feature different children.

== Record Albums (1984–1995) ==
Prior to the TV series, a series of record albums was released during the 80s and early 90s. Two of them were adapted into videos. There was also a VHS release titled "Colby's Place" in 1989. It wasn't based on any albums, but it was possibly a pilot episode for another planned series that never came to fruition (most likely because it was rejected for being too similar to "Kids Incorporated"). The last album, "A Heart to Give" was adapted into the first episode of the final TV series, which was divided into two parts. The following is a list of the albums in their release order.

- Colby 1: Make a Joyful Noise (1984)
- Colby 2: Colby's Missing Memory (1985 [Video 1986])
- Colby 3: Save Colby's Clubhouse (1986)
- Colby 4: God Uses Kids (1987)
- Colby 5: Putting Feet on Faith (1990 [Video, 1992])
- Colby 6: Colby's Bible Camp Catastrophe (1991)
- Colby 7: A Heart to Give (1995)

== Episodes ==
=== Season 1 (1995–96) ===
No. overall	No. in season	Title	Original release date
1	1	"A Heart to Give (Part 1)"	November 26, 1995
2	2	"A Heart to Give (Part 2)"	November 26, 1995
3	3	"Vandella Virus Visits"	December 17, 1995
4	4	"It's Almost Christmas"	December 24, 1995
5	5	"Check Your Connection"	December 31, 1995
6	6	"The Ballgame"	January 7, 1996
7	7	"Willing for Forgiveness"	January 14, 1996
8	8	"Showing Up"	January 21, 1996
9	9	"Colby's Birthday"	January 28, 1996
10	10	"Danielle Discovers"	February 4, 1996
11	11	"Helping Beau's Grandpa"	February 11, 1996
12	12	"50's and 60's Day (Part 1)"	February 25, 1996
13	13	"50's and 60's Day (Part 2)"	February 25, 1996
14	14	"Danielle's New Clothes"	March 3, 1996
15	15	"It Was Performed by Being a Kid"	March 10, 1996
16	16	"Clubhouse Inspector"	March 17, 1996

=== Season 2 (1996–97) ===
No. overall	No. in season	Title	Original release date
17	1	"Anorexia"	October 20, 1996
18	2	"Zane's Operation"	October 27, 1996
19	3	"Sing Along Show (Part 1)"	November 17, 1996
20	4	"Sing Along Show (Part 2)"	November 17, 1996
21	5	"Thanksgiving Show!"	November 24, 1996
22	6	"Brett's Older Brother"	December 15, 1996
23	7	"The Guys Performing a Rock Band (Part 1)"	January 26, 1997
24	8	"The Guys Performing a Rock Band (Part 2)"	January 26, 1997
25	9	"The Puppet Show"	February 2, 1997
26	10	"A Friendship Clubhouse"	February 9, 1997

=== Season 3 (1997–2000) ===
No. overall	No. in season	Title	Original release date
27	1	"Jessica Had to Move Away"	September 14, 1997
28	2	"Homeless Vet"	October 5, 1997
29	3	"Crystal is a Guest"	November 9, 1997
30	4	"The Popular Crowd"	March 1, 1998
31	5	"Shoeboxes"	April 26, 1998
32	6	"Worship Around the World"	May 31, 1998
33	7	"Finding Your Own Special Talents"	June 14, 1998
34	8	"Camping Trip"	July 5, 1998
35	9	"Krysta's Sister Has Problems"	August 16, 1998
36	10	"Basketball and Bullies"	September 27, 1998
37	11	"All Things Work Together"	May 9, 1999
38	12	"Helping Missionaries"	November 7, 1999
39	13	"Dawn's Reputation"	January 16, 2000
40	14	"Having Fun with Friends"	April 2, 2000
41	15	"Dealing with Bigots"	June 18, 2000
42	16	"Easter Show"	August 27, 2000
43	17	"Brittany Finds a Dog"	December 31, 2000

== Cast ==
- Peter Jacobs as Colby the Computer

=== Children ===
- Jessica Adams
- Rachel Balich
- Saxon Christin
- Beau Clark
- Kiera Cope
- Jonathan Curry
- Ryan Devin
- Brittany Durlach
- Laura Fager
- Zane Gerson
- Gina Gonzalez
- Adam Hill
- Danielle Hogg
- Paulina Johnson
- Kevin Jones
- Dawn Jordan
- Danielle Kincebach
- Casey Lagos
- Randy Landingham
- Matthew Lomakin
- Jake Mann
- Brandon Muchow
- Tyler Newman
- Andrew Pollaro
- Jason Rausavljevick
- Krysta Rodriguez
- Matt Sackett
- Randy Stuck
- Delana Tillman
- Brett Traina
- Aaron Vaughan
- Stephanie Wall
- Lindsey Weeks
- Christopher Williams
- Peter Woo

== See also ==
- Gerbert (TV series)
