= Bibleman =

American Christian direct-to-video children's series

- Genre: Action; Children's series Superhero
- Created by: Tony Salerno
- Starring: Willie Aames; Marc Wayne; Maylo Upton; Brady Williams; Brian Lemmons; Jeff Scott; Robert Schlipp
- Country of origin: United States
- Original language: English
- No. of episodes: 32 (live-action); 26 (animated)

Production
- Camera setup: Single-camera
- Running time: 29–56 minutes
- Production companies: Pamplin Entertainment; Tommy Nelson; B&H Kids

Original release
- Network: Direct-to-video; Australian Christian Channel; Smile of a Child
- Release: 1995 – 2010
- Release: 2016 – 2020

Bibleman is an American Christian-themed direct-to-video children's series created by Tony Salerno that ran from 1995 to 2010. The series centers around an evangelical superhero who fights evil, often by quoting scripture, and sometimes breaks the fourth wall.

The show had three incarnations: The Bibleman Show, The Bibleman Adventure, and Bibleman: Powersource. The series' titular character was played by Willie Aames from 1995 to 2003 and by Robert T. Schlipp from 2004 to 2010. Originally owned by Pamplin Entertainment, then sold to Tommy Nelson, the series is currently owned by B&H Kids. It was re-launched in CGI format in 2016 (new title Bibleman: The Animated Adventures).

Bibleman was also broadcast on the Australian Christian Channel in Australia.

== Plot ==
Miles B. Peterson is a wealthy man who turns to God after he finds a Bible in some mud. From then on, he pledges to fight evil with the word of God. Disguised in the full armor of God, Bibleman fights against enemies using scripture.

== Characters ==
=== Heroes ===
Miles Peterson/Bibleman (played by Willie Aames): The first Bibleman. As depicted in the early show's intro, Miles was described as a man who had success, fame, and wealth but was a frustrated and miserable man. After giving up and throwing himself to the ground in anguish, he discovers a Bible covered in mud. Upon finding it, he experiences a "burning desire to know God" and becomes a Christian. He then decides to fight evil in the name of God as Bibleman. Miles eventually retired, passing on the title of Bibleman to his successor Josh Carpenter. Miles' first 3 Bibleman suits consisted of a purple and yellow color scheme, but during “Jesus Our Savior” he built a new suit, which was silver and white. Miles’ armor is based on the Armor of God, consisting of the Waist Belt of Truth, the Breastplate of Righteousness, the Shoes of Peace, the Shield of Faith and the Helmet of Salvation. His weapon is a laser sword called the Sword of the Spirit, which is the physical representation of God's Word, the Bible. While he isn't seen in the Animated Adventures, Miles was mentioned in “Braving The Big Battle With The Baroness” as an old friend of Josh Carpenter, which has not been alluded to before in the live-action series.

Coats (played by Marc Wayne): Miles Peterson's best friend and first sidekick, who coaches high school basketball on the side. While Coats didn't have a superhero suit like future sidekicks, he did have a bunch of gadgets and some self-defense training, allowing him to fight off the henchmen of a villain. Coats left the team for reasons classified as stated in "Conquering the Wrath of Rage Live (2000)".

U.N.I.C.E (voiced by Maylo Upton, Jef Scott, and Lisa Kent): (Universal Networking Intelligence Computing Entity) The AI in the BibleCave and Mobile Mission Command Center who gives attitude to Bibleman's sidekick Coats and insists on manners being used even if it wastes time. Strangely, U.N.I.C.E. isn't included in the Animated Adventures.

Kerry "KT" Turner/Cypher (played by Brady Williams and voiced by JJ Gerber in the Animated Adventures): Bibleman's second sidekick. KT originally wore silver armor with black cameo pants and boots, with a headset that had a scope. Later, his suit color was changed to match Bibleman's, with an eye cover added. In, “A Fight For Faith”, KT would remove the headset and eye cover, for yellow strap-on glasses with black lenses. KT originally didn't have a weapon, but would later gain two energy blades that, when put together, can create a forcefield.

Lia Martin(or Lia Martinez in early appearances)/Biblegirl (played by Tracy Henao, Heather Hazelwood-McSmith, Anayansi Schlipp, and voiced by Nicole Bauman in the Animated Adventures): She first fights with a net, then a gun and then a side shooting weapon. In Powersource she later uses an energy Tonfa. During the beginning of Powersource, Biblegirl was away at Command Central, but returned in Crushing the Conspiracy of the Cheater.

Josh Carpenter/Bibleman (played by Robert T. Schlipp and voiced by Josh Snethlage in the Animated Adventures): The second Bibleman after Miles retires. He is depicted as someone who never understood the Bible until his darkest day (when his parents were arguing) where he read his Bible and accepted Jesus Christ as his Lord and Savior. Josh originally wore the 4th Bibleman suit, until Powersource, where he gained his own suit which returned to the classic purple and yellow color scheme. Just like Miles’, Josh's armor was made up of the Waist Belt of Truth, the Breastplate of Righteousness, the Shoes of Peace, the Shield of Faith and the Helmet of Salvation. Also just like Miles, Josh wields a Laser Sword in battle.

Mel O'Shea/Melody. (played by Lindsay Lewis and voiced by Kylie McCullough in the Animated Adventures) Biblegirl's cousin. She is the only sidekick to have never served alongside Miles Peterson. Her outfit is colored blue and red and uses a laser staff. In the Animated Adventures, her suit colors were changed to match the rest of the team.

=== Villains ===
Dr. Decepto (played by Ron Schott): A scientist villain with green skin. He only appeared in a flashback in Big Big Book, where he defeated Bibleman, but was later seen behind bars.

Madam Glitz (played by Cindy Phillips): A self-centred woman in Back to School. She captured Miles Peterson (Bibleman) because she wanted the fame Bibleman had. However, Bibleman tells her that it is the Word of God that everyone desires and needs to hear. She was placed inside a T.V. set by God.

The Fibbler (played by Bill Murphy and voiced by Peter Jaycock in the Animated Adventures): A green-haired evil clown (resembling the Cesar Romero version of the Joker from the 1960s Batman TV series) who influenced one of the church singing group children to lie. After she asks her friends for forgiveness, The Fibbler and Bibleman fight. The Fibbler was defeated and destroyed by his own sword of darkness. In the animated adventures, the new version of The Fibbler speaks with a Scottish accent and has a green diamond called the Whispering Stone; this allows him to control kids and make them lie, even if they don't want to. The stone also allows Fibbler to create energy weapons; he was also lent the Invisibility Belt by Dr. Fear.

The Gossip Queen (played by Maylo Upton): A villainess queen whose character design was later widely criticized for sharing many characteristics with traditional Jewish stereotypes (e.g., possessing dark skin, curly black hair, a large hook-nose, thick lips, and dark-colored beady eyes). She tried to rip the Church singing group apart. She has two henchmen named Loose Lips and Blabbermouth and could fire Beams of Bitterness from her fingers. She was destroyed when she was hit by Bibleman's sword of the Spirit.

Luxor Spawndroth (played by Brian Lemmons and voiced by Rory O'Shea in the Animated Adventures): A villain who takes on different personas after defeat. These incarnations include The Shadow of Doubt, Master of Misery, Dr. Fear, El Furioso, The Prince of Pride, and finally his real name, Luxor Spawndroth. His weapon is the sword of darkness, which is either red or, in a couple of cases, purple. Spawndroth was defeated for good in Lead Us Not Into Temptation. In the animated series, Dr. Fear, Prince of Pride, and the Shadow of Doubt appear as separate incarnations.

Ludicrous (played by Steve Weatherford, Andrew Hicks, Bret Harrison, Les VanValkinburgh, and voiced by Scott Nichol and Cameron Elvin in the Animated Adventures): The evil sidekick of Luxor Spawndroth. From The Fiendish Works of Dr. Fear to Shattering The Prince Of Pride, he was a teenager, but in Breaking The Bonds Of Disobedience and Lead Us Not Into Temptation, he was played by a heavy set man. In Lead Us Not Into Temptation, he was defeated for good by Cypher.

L.U.C.I. (voiced by Maylo Upton, Jef Scott, and Lisa Kent): (The Link to Underhanded Computer Influences) is the evil counterpart to U.N.I.C.E and computer to all the villains starting with Dr. Fear. Just like U.N.I.C.E., L.U.C.I. isn't included in the Animated Adventures.

Primordius Drool (played by Jef Scott): is a green-skinned demon with great powers including wielding lightning who, later in the series, is punished, becoming 'The Wacky Protestor'.

- The Wacky Protestor (played by Jef Scott and Jonathon Barger): was a goofy, blue-skinned demon scientist who was formerly 'Primordius Drool' before he got demoted. His abilities include plasma balls. During his final scheme, he created a special portal to another realm to trap Christian students and turn them to atheism. However, he got caught in his own trap and was stuck there forever. He was the first villain fought by the second Bibleman, Josh Carpenter.

Rapscallion Polite Sinister (played by Kevin McSmith): was the villain fought by Bibleman in the 2005 live show, hired by the Wacky Protestor to take out the source of Bibleman's power. He was defeated when placed inside a cage that sucked out his power.

Professor E. Meritus Snortinskoff (played by Steve Sandfort): A mad scientist who's in charge of Snortinskoff Industries and makes kids disrespect their authorities. His henchman is Stench.

Stench (played by Henry Haggard): This character is a henchmen of Professor E. Meritus Snortinskoff.

2Kul 4Skul (played by Jeff Durham): A gray-skinned villain who devised a plan to establish a T.V. station with the call letters W.B.I.G. (which stand for What's Bad is Good) to block the gospel from reaching the youth.

I.M. Wonderful (played by Amber Liabenow and Lisa Kent): A vain woman who wears a gold mask and a cape.

The Whiner Brothers (played by Rick Burgess and Bubba Bussey, and voiced by David Andrew Brent and Peter Jaycock in the Animated Adventures): Two villains who use a radio station broadcast to make children whine and complain.

The Cheater (played by Peter Vann): Best among super villains. His tools are his "belittler," his flying cards, land mines, and a bouncy house gladiator club. If one is unlucky enough to get him angry, The Cheater will unplug his/her surge protector.

The Slacker (played by Josh Childs and voiced by Cameron Elvin in the Animated Adventures): This senior villain makes kids lazy with his Lasers of Laziness. He carries a staff (laser of laziness) and goons to support him in battle. He can also teleport and possesses clairvoyance.

Super Pro Gamemaster 2 (played by Henry Haggard): This villain was a cyborg who could control machines. He appeared in "Lambasting the Legions of Laziness".

Super Pro Gamemaster 3 (played by Eric Pasto-Crosby): This robotic leader of the Evildoers Club was Super Pro Gamemaster 2's successor. He has powers similar to his predecessor and developed the video game Big Bad Bully.

Baron Ulysses Tantamont von Braggart (played by Clarck Leach): A sheriff-like pig villain with a golden head cap who lives in a castle. His weapons are his electric staff that he uses to battle Bibleman, and his electric chair that he uses to shoot at Bibleman and Cypher.

The Commandant of Confusion (played by Dean Guthrie) A gold-skinned heavyweight villain who is very technical and has an evil sidekick named Chaos, who is dressed up in a black and red jumpsuit.

Chaos (played by Joey Febres) A Henchman in a black and red suit and mask, who is said to have worked with many villains, but is only seen with The Commandant of Confusion.

The Sultan of Selfishness (voiced by Peter-Mark Raphael) An olive-skinned man with black, curly hair, black eyebrows and eyes, a black goatee, and a green Nehru suit with gold trimmings. He temporarily gains control of a school by posing as a motivational speaker who dispenses small stickers that cause all the students and faculty to become susceptible to the Sultan's 3Ds credo: Demand, Deserve, Dominate.

The Baroness: A female villain who gets her powers from a green crystal on her cane. Called the Conflict Crystal, whoever looks at, or is touched by it, is induced to begin arguing with those around them. The crystal then absorbs the energy from the conflict to recharge its power. However, the crystal will lose its power if there's no arguing for it to recharge itself with.

The Crusher is a villain wanting to spread violence. He has two henchmen and super strength.

The Grand Duchess of Greed: also known as Gwyneth Reed or simply the Grand Duchess is a villain who can infect people with her glitter kisses. When she blows a kiss onto an object or person, it can infect the person with greed (in the case of Lila) or disrespect (in her second appearance).

The Mayor of Maybe: a villain who makes kids doubt and question their faith in God. He accomplishes this through the use of bubblegum, but gets trapped in it himself and is seen floating away.

The Ronin of Wrong is a villain who wants to spread wrongdoing. He wears a helmet that is "two sizes too small".

== Reception ==
The program has been criticized for its format and production values, including in an August 2009 episode of the UK topical show You Have Been Watching, with panelist David Mitchell saying "The thing that struck me most about it is quite how badly it is made, to the extent that you must think it's been made by anti-Christian people to make Christianity look as naff and discouraging and artless as possible." The series has been described as dogmatically evangelical.

In 1998, sales made up less than one percent of the Christian children's video market. Three years later, sales climbed to eleven percent of that market. It held third place behind first place VeggieTales and second place 3-2-1 Penguins! which were both produced by Big Idea Entertainment. The Dove Foundation gave the series its "Family-Approved" seal for "this energetic battle against evil."

However, several adults have criticized the show's fight scenes as promoting violence, despite the fact, one show ("Conquering The Wrath Of Rage"), and its live counterpart, addressed the violence issue.

Of Bibleman, Marc Peyser of Newsweek writes,

Much of Christian entertainment, like the "Bibleman" videos featuring a Scripture-quoting superhero, is designed as a kinder, gentler yet more searching alternative for an audience that has long felt overlooked by the prevailing media and entertainment culture. But as those products have become more successful—and the people in those industries have become savvier—the category has edged closer to the mainstream. Pop music that never mentions the word, Jesus. Movies that spend as much time blowing up buildings as saving souls. As with other groups that have created their own subcultures, Christian entertainment has emerged from its sheltered infancy and has begun to straddle two worlds: the religious one that created it and the secular one it was designed to avoid.

The live show has been described as falling between "a high budget Sunday school pageant, a Batman movie, and the Teenage Mutant Ninja Turtles to even Power Rangers in how it comes across." The production borrows heavily from popular culture, including films, popular music and video games.

== Merchandise ==
=== Action figures ===
In October 2000, Tommy Nelson released the first series of 5" Bibleman action figures starting with Bibleman and villain El Furioso. The series later included figures of Cypher, Biblegirl, and Temptation. The final figure in the series was a platinum version of Bibleman.

=== Board game ===
The Bibleman Adventure board game was released by Talicor in 2001. Players select a hero card and matching token to battle the "Bad Guys" while traveling quickly through the town of Shatzville in an attempt to "save the children." The first player to rescue six kids, deliver them safely to the town church and race back to the BibleMan Cave is the winner! The BibleMan board game is actually two games in one. Instructions are included for both a Basic Game (Ages 3–6), and an Advanced Game (Ages 7 & up) and allows for both age groups to play at the same time.

=== Music ===
Bibleman over the years released multiple official CDs including but limited to: Bibleman Live (2004), Bibleman Official Soundtrack (2005), and Bibleman 18 Songs to Trounce Villains by.

=== Video game ===
A Bibleman computer game was released in 2005 by Covenant Studios titled The Bibleman Video Game Adventure: A Fight for Faith. It received generally mixed reviews. Although it did receive some negative reviews, it was praised by some evangelical Christian gaming sites for "family-friendly" and "Christ-centered" gameplay.

=== Books ===
In 2000 Tommy Nelson published The Bibleman Bible, using the ICB translation text and featured 32 full color images from the show and mini-comic sections. Tommy Nelson then published The Official Bibleman Collector's Edition book the same year, then in 2001 published Bibleman Combat Manual, a book intended to aid in memorizing bible verses.

== Episodes ==
=== The Bibleman Show ===
- Big Big Book (1995)
- Back To School (1995)
- The Six Lies of the Fibbler (1996)
- Silencing the Gossip Queen (1996)

=== The Bibleman Adventure ===
- Defeating the Shadow of Doubt (1998)
- The Fiendish Works of Dr. Fear (1999)
- The Incredible Force of Joy (1999)
- The Visual Bible: The Stories of Jesus (2000)
- Conquering the Wrath of Rage (2000)
- Shattering the Prince of Pride (2000)
- Breaking the Bonds of Disobedience (2001)
- Lead Us Not Into Temptation (2001)
- Jesus Our Savior Part 1 (2002)
- Jesus Our Savior Part 2 (2003)
- A Light in the Darkness (2003)
- Divided We Fall (2004)
- A Fight For Faith (2004)

==== Live videos ====
- The Incredible Force of Joy Live (1999)
- Conquering the Wrath of Rage Live (2000)
- Breaking the Bonds of Disobedience Live (2001)
- A Light in the Darkness Live (2004)
- A Fight For Faith Live (2005)

=== Bibleman Jr. ===
- Thankful for Jesus (2000)
- God Loves Everyone (2000)
- God Loves to Laugh (2000)
- God's Beautiful Child (2000)

=== Bibleman: Powersource ===
- Terminating the Toxic Tonic of Disrespect (2006)
- Tuning Out The Unholy Hero (2007)
- Crushing the Conspiracy of the Cheater (2007)
- Lambasting the Legions of Laziness (2008)
- Blasting The Big Gamemaster Bully (2009)
- In the Presence of Enemies (2010)

==== Live videos ====
- Combating The Commandant of Confusion: A Bibleman Live Adventure (2010)

=== Bibleman: The Animated Adventures ===
- Clobbering the Crusher (2016)
- Braving the Big Battle with the Baroness (2016)
- Repelling the Ronin of Wrong (2016)
- Melting the Master of Mean (2016)
- The Mayor of Maybe Doles Out Doubt (2016)
- Dr. Fear's Almost Perfectly Disastrous Day (2016)
- Disabling the Disobey Ray (2017)
- Ambushed by the Ambassador of Ignorance (2017)
- Stopping the Sultan of Selfishness (2017)
- Lighting Up the Shadow of Doubt (2017)
- Fracturing the Falsehoods of the Fibbler (2017)
- Wiping Out the Whiner Brothers (2017)
- Spoiling the Schemes of Luxor Spawndroth Part 1 (2017)
- Spoiling the Schemes of Luxor Spawndroth Part 2 (2017)
- Fibbler's Fakery Goes Up In Fireworks (2017)
- Scraping The Sultan's Stinging Stickers Of Selfishness (2018)
- Say Goodbye, to the Grand Duchess of Greed Part 1 (2018)
- Say Goodbye, to the Grand Duchess of Greed Part 2 (2018)
- Halting the Hateful Hand of Mister Malevolent (2019)
- Expelling the Empress of Unhappiness (2019)
- A Wake-Up Call for the Slacker (2019)
- Dispatching the Grand Duchess’ Disrespectful Desserts (2019)
- Pulverizing the Plans of the Prince of Pride (2020)
- A Stand For Jesus Foils Dr. Fear (2020)
- Getting Right Wrecks The Ronin Of Wrong (2020)
- Bible Brigade Versus The Ambassador Of Ignorance (2020)

== In popular culture ==
- The series was director James Gunn's inspiration for the Holy Avenger featured in the 2010 film Super.
- Bibleman was featured in the tabletop role playing game Mutants & Masterminds as a responsible superhero, very similar in dress and character to his television counterpart.
