= List of AC Comics publications =

This is a list of comics publications released by AC Comics (formerly known as "Paragon Publications" and "Americomics").

== List ==
Title	Series	Issues	Dates	Notes
America's Greatest Comics		16	2002–2006	
Americomics		6	April 1983 – March 1984	(cancelled)
Americomics Special		1	Aug. 1983	Published during the very brief time that AC was able to license the Charlton Comics superheroes before the rights were purchased outright by DC Comics. The team consisted of Captain Atom, Blue Beetle, the Question, and Nightshade.
Bad Girl Backlash		1	Dec. 1995	
Best of the West		71	1998–2009	(cancelled)
Big 'Uns		2	1998–2004	
Bill Black's Fun Comics		2	1982–1983	Continues from Fun Comics #1-2.
Black Diamond		5	May 1983 – 1984	
Captain Paragon	3	1; 4; 5	1972; Dec. 1983 – 1985; Apr. 1985 – 1986	Paragon Publications, from Paragon Presents... #1 Captain Paragon and the Sentinels of Justice
Dragonfly		8	Summer 1985 – 1987	(cancelled)
Faze 1 Fazers		4	1986	
Fem Fantastique		3	1971–1978	Paragon Publications
Femforce			1985–present	
Femzine	2	1; 4	1981; Jan. 2003 – May 2007	
Fun Comics		2	1981–1982	Continues as Bill Black's Fun Comics #3-4.
Garganta's Thrilling Science		1	2001	
Green Lama: Man of Strength		3	2009	(cancelled)
Golden Age Men of Mystery		16	1996–1999	Continued as Men of Mystery Comics.
Golden Age Treasury (a.k.a. Golden Age Spotlight)		2	2002–2003	
Good Girl Art Quarterly	2	15; 1	1990 – Spring 1994; 2001	Vol. 1 continued as Good Girl Comics #16–18; vol. 2 begins with issue #19.
Jungle Girls		16	1989–1993	
Macabre Western		2	1972–1973	Paragon Publications
Men of Mystery Comics			1999–present	Continued numbering from Golden Age Men of Mystery.
Ms. Victory Special		1	1985	
Nightveil	2	7; 1	1984–1987; 2001	(cancelled)
Paragon: Dark Apocalypse		4	1993	limited series
Paragon Illustrated		6	1969–1975	Paragon Publications (#5 published as Paragon Magazine)
Paragon Presents...		2	1970	Paragon Publications (#1 Captain Paragon, #2 Dark Continent)
Paragon Super Heroes		1	1973	Paragon Publications
Paragon Western Stars		1	1975	Paragon Publications, #3 (single issue) continued from Paragon Magazine #5 and Paragon Illustrated #6
Priority: White Heat		2	1986	limited series
Sentinels of Justice		6	1993–1994	(cancelled)
The Shade		1	Fall 1984	Special
She-Cat		6	1989–1995	(cancelled)
Star Fems		2	1980–1982	Paragon Publications
Sentinels of Justice		6	1993–1994	(cancelled)
Tara on the Dark Continent		2	1974–1979	Paragon Publications, from Paragon Presents... #2
Venture		3	1986–1987	(cancelled)
White Savage		1	1970	Paragon Publications
