= List of Sentinels of Justice members =

The Sentinels of Justice are a number of fictional superhero teams published by AC Comics.

== Charlton Comics version ==
Character	Real name	Joined in	Notes
Captain Atom	Allen Adam	Americomics Special #1 (Aug. 1983)	
Blue Beetle	Ted Kord	Americomics Special #1 (Aug. 1983)	
Question	Victor (Vic) Sage	Americomics Special #1 (Aug. 1983)	
Nightshade	Eve Eden	Americomics Special #1 (Aug. 1983)	

== Founding members ==
Character	Real name	Joined in	Notes
Captain Paragon/Paragon	Charlie Starrett	Captain Paragon and Sentinels of Justice #1	Advisor/trainer to current group.
Nightveil a.k.a. Blue Bulleteer	Laura Wright	Captain Paragon and Sentinels of Justice #1	Member of Femforce.
Stardust	Mara	Captain Paragon and Sentinels of Justice #1	Member of Femforce.
Commando D	Kon-Nor	Captain Paragon and Sentinels of Justice #1	Advisor/trainer to current group.
Scarlet Scorpion	Mike McCluskey	Captain Paragon and Sentinels of Justice #1	Advisor/trainer to current group.

== New team ==
New team launched in Femforce #58-60.

Character	Real name	Joined in	Notes
American Crusader	Archibald "Archie" Masters	Femforce #58	
Avenger	Roger Wright	Femforce #58	
Black Venus		Femforce #58	
Captain Flash	Professor Keith Spencer	Femforce #58	
Catman	David Merryweather	Femforce #58	
Darkfire		Femforce #58	Joins FearForce under cover.
Green Lama	Jethro Dumont	Femforce #58	Dies in Femforce #60.
Hood		Femforce #58	
Jet Girl		Femforce #58	
Kitten	Katie Conn	Femforce #58	
Miss Masque	Diana Adams	Femforce #58	
Paragon a.k.a. Miss Victory & Rad	Jennifer Burke	Femforce #58	Now the villain Rad.
Reddevil	Bart Hill	Femforce #58	An apparently renamed Lev Leason Publication's Daredevil.
Rocketman		Femforce #58	
Yankee Girl	Lauren Mason	Femforce #58	
