= List of female superheroes =

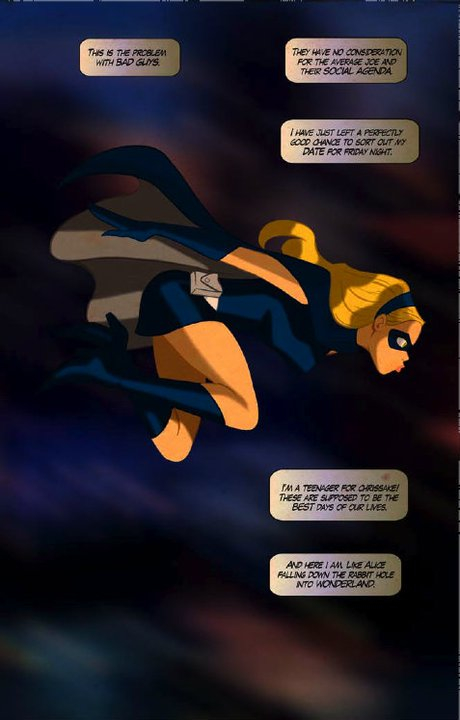
The Legend of the Blue Lotus

The following is a list of female superheroes in comic books, television, film, and other media. Each character's name is followed by the publisher's name in parentheses; those from television or movies have their program listed in square brackets, and those in both comic books and other media appear in parentheses.

Contents

Top - A B C D E F G H I J K L M N O P Q R S T U V W X Y Z

See also – External links

== A ==
- Adept (Marvel Comics)
- Alisha (Misfits)
- Agent Red (Miraculous: Tales of Ladybug & Cat Noir)
- Agent Yellow (Miraculous: Tales of Ladybug & Cat Noir)
- Agent Blue (Miraculous: Tales of Ladybug & Cat Noir)
- Amber (Eclipse Comics)
- America Chavez (Marvel Comics)
- American Dream (Marvel Comics - MC2)
- American Maid (The Tick)
- Amethyst, Princess of Gemworld (DC Comics)
- Animalia (Marvel Comics)
- An Yu (PJ Masks)
- Andromeda (DC Comics)
- Andromeda (Marvel Comics)
- Angela (Image Comics) + (Marvel Comics)
- Aquagirl (DC Comics)
- Argent (DC Comics)
- Ariel (Marvel Comics)
- Arisia Rrab (DC Comics)
- Armor (Marvel Comics)
- Arrowette (DC Comics)
- Artemis of Bana-Mighdall (DC Comics)
- Mina Ashido (My Hero Academia)
- Tsuyu Asui (My Hero Academia)
- Atom Eve (Image Comics)
- Atomic Betty (television series' title character)
- Aurora (Marvel Comics)
- Avengelyne (various)
- Avenger (Lynn Michaels)

== B ==
- B.Orchid (Killer Instinct)
- Ballistic (Cyberforce member; Top Cow)
- Bandita (Phoenix Studios)
- Barb Wire (Dark Horse)
- Bastet (PJ Masks)
- Batgirl (DC Comics)
- Batwoman (DC Comics)
- Beautiful Dreamer (DC Comics)
- Bella Donna (Marvel Comics)
- Belphegor (DC Comics)
- Betsy Braddock (a.k.a. Psylocke/Captain Britain; Marvel Comics)
- Wanda Blake (Image Comics)
- Claire Bennet (Heroes)
- Biblegirl (Bibleman)
- Bibou (Éditions Gallimard)
- Big Barda (DC Comics)
- Big Bertha (Marvel Comics)
- Binary (a.k.a Captain Marvel or Ms. Marvel; Carol Danvers) (Marvel Comics)
- Bitsy (SuperKitties)
- Vera Black (a.k.a. Sister Superior; DC Comics)
- Black Canary (DC Comics)
- Black Cat (Harvey Comics)
- Black Cat (Marvel Comics)
- Black Orchid (DC Comics)
- Black Widow (Natasha Romanoff)
- Black Widow (Timely Comics)
- Blackbat (DC Comics)
- Blacklight (Marvel Comics - MC2)
- Blackthorn (Marvel Comics)
- Blindfold (Marvel Comics)
- Bling! (Marvel Comics)
- Blink (Marvel Comics)
- Blonde Blazer (Dispatch)
- Bloodruth (Rippaverse Comics)
- Blossom (The Powerpuff Girls)
- Bloom (Winx Club)
- Bluebird (DC Comics)
- Bluestreak (Marvel Comics - MC2)
- Boodikka (DC Comics)
- Boom Boom (Boomer, Meltdown, Timebomb) (Marvel Comics)
- Brandy (Image Comics)
- Brava (Marvel Comics)
- Bride of Frankenstein (DC Comics)
- Bronze (Marvel Comics)
- Bubbles (The Powerpuff Girls)
- Buff (Marvel Comics)
- Bulleteer (DC Comics)
- Bulletgirl (see Bulletman and Bulletgirl; DC Comics)
- Bumblebee (DC Comics)
- Bunnyx (Miraculous: Tales of Ladybug & Cat Noir)
- Burka Avenger
- Burn (Marvel Comics)
- Burnout (Eclipse Comics)
- Buttercup (The Powerpuff Girls)

== C ==
- Caitlin Fairchild (DC Comics - Wildstorm)
- Calico (Marvel Comics)
- Callisto (Marvel Comics)
- Cambria (The Amory Wars)
- Captain Britain (Betsy Braddock) (Marvel Comics)
- Captain Confederacy (Marvel Comics)
- Captain Marvel (Marvel Comics)
- Captain Universe (Marvel Comics)
- Cat Claw (Malibu Comics)
- Catwoman (DC Comics)
- Celsius (DC Comics)
- Cerebella (Marvel Comics)
- Cerebra (Marvel Comics)
- Cerise (Marvel Comics)
- Chance (Marvel Comics)
- Chase (DC Comics)
- Chastity (Chaos Comics)
- Lila Cheney (Marvel Comics)
- Choice (Marvel - Ultraverse)
- Cimarron (Eclipse Comics)
- Cinnamon (DC Comics)
- Clea (Marvel Comics)
- Cloud (Marvel Comics)
- Cloud 9 (Marvel Comics)
- Coagula (DC Comics)
- Cobweb (America's Best Comics)
- Colt (AC Comics)
- Comet Queen (DC Comics)
- Copycat (DC Comics - Wildstorm)
- Copycat (Marvel Comics)
- Coupe (Dispatch)
- Anya Corazon (Marvel Comics)
- Crazy Jane (DC Comics)
- Crimson Avenger (DC Comics)
- Crimson Curse (Marvel Comics - MC2)
- Crimson Fox (DC Comics)
- Crystal (Marvel Comics)
- Cyberella (title character) (Helix comics)
- Cybergirl (title character)
- Cybersix
- Cyblade (Top Cow)
- Cyclone (DC Comics)
- Cyclops-Lass (Marvel Comics)

== D ==
- Dabung Girl (Deeper Learning Comics)
- Dagger (Marvel Comics)
- Danger (Marvel Comics)
- Darkstar (Marvel Comics)
- Darna (Mango Comics)
- Dart (DC Comics)
- Dart (Image Comics - Highbrow Ent)
- Dawn (Sirius Entertainment)
- Dawnstar (DC Comics)
- Dazzler (Marvel Comics)
- Dead Girl (Marvel Comics)
- Karolina Dean (Marvel Comics)
- Debrii (Marvel Comics)
- Decay (Marvel Comics)
- Deep Blue (DC Comics)
- Destiny (Marvel Comics)
- Devi (Virgin Comics)
- Diamond Lil (Marvel Comics)
- Diamondback (Marvel Comics)
- Dinah Soar (Marvel Comics)
- Diva (DC Comics - Wildstorm)
- Doctor Light (DC Comics)
- Doctor Mid-Nite (DC Comics)
- Doll Girl (DC Comics)
- Dolphin (DC Comics)
- Domino (Marvel Comics)
- Domino Lady (Pulps)
- Dove (DC Comics)
- Dragonfly (AC Comics)
- Dragonna (Mars Ravelo's)
- Dream Girl (DC Comics)
- Dumb Bunny (DC Comics)
- Dupli-Kate (Image Comics)
- Dusk (Marvel Comics)
- Dust (Marvel Comics)
- Dyna Girl (Krofft)

== E ==
- Eagle (a.k.a. Sparrow; Miraculous: Tales of Ladybug & Cat Noir)
- Echo (Marvel Comics)
- Elasti-Girl (DC Comics)
- Elastigirl (The Incredibles)
- Electra Woman (Krofft)
- Elektra (Marvel Comics)
- Empowered (Dark Horse Comics)
- Empress (DC Comics)
- Emma Frost (a.k.a White Queen) (Marvel Comics)
- Energizer (Marvel Comics)
- Engineer (DC - Wildstorm)
- Ernst (Marvel Comics)
- Escapade (Marvel Comics)

== F ==
- Faith (DC Comics)
- Fallen Angel (DC Comics)
- Fantômette (Collection Rose)
- Fathom (one of the Elementals, Comico Comics)
- Fathom (Aspen Comics)
- Feral (Marvel)
- Fever (DC Comics)
- Finesse (Marvel Comics)
- Fire (DC Comics)
- Firebird (Marvel Comics)
- Firestar (Marvel Comics)
- Fixx (Marvel Comics)
- Flamebird (DC Comics)
- Fleur-de-Lis (DC Comics)
- Flint (WS)
- Flora (Winx Club)
- Forerunner (DC Comics)
- Free Spirit (Marvel Comics)
- Freefall (DC Comics - Wildstorm)
- Freeze Girl (Sky High)
- Tara Fremont (AC Comics)
- Fury (DC Comics)

== G ==
- Gaia (Marvel Comics)
- Galura (Marvel Comics)
- Gamora (Marvel Comics)
- Ganymede (Marvel Comics)
- Garganta (AC Comics)
- G-Girl (My Super Ex-Girlfriend)
- Ghost (Dark Horse Comics)
- Gimmick (Marvel Comics)
- Gin Genie (Marvel Comics)
- Ginny (SuperKitties)
- Glitter (Marvel - New Universe)
- Glory (various)
- Gloss (DC Comics)
- Godiva (DC Comics)
- Good Boy (Marvel Comics)
- Grace (DC Comics)
- Granny Smite (Marvel Comics)
- Vicki Grant (DC Comics)
- Green Ghost (Image Comics)
- Gretel (Hamster & Gretel)
- Jean Grey (a.k.a Marvel Girl or Phoenix) (Marvel Comics)
- Gabby Gomez/Gum Girl (Disney/Hyperion)
- Gypsy (DC Comics)

== H ==
- Nejire Hado (My Hero Academia)
- Toru Hagakure (My Hero Academia)
- Cornelia Hale (W.I.T.C.H.)
- Halo (DC Comics)
- Harbinger (DC Comics)
- Hawk (DC Comics)
- Hawkeye (Kate Bishop) (Marvel Comics)
- Hawkgirl (DC Comics)
- Hawkwoman (DC Comics)
- Molly Hayes (Marvel Comics)
- Hay Lin (W.I.T.C.H.)
- Hazmat (Marvel Comics)
- Hellcat (Marvel Comics)
- Satana Hellstrom (Marvel Comics)
- Hepzibah (Marvel Comics)
- Hippolyta (DC Comics)
- Hit Girl (Kick-Ass)
- Horridus (Image Comics - Highbrow Ent)
- Heather Hudson, formerly Sasquatch, Exiles member (Marvel Comics)
- Hummingbird (Marvel Comics)
- Huntara (Marvel Comics)
- Henrietta Hunter (Marvel Comics)
- Huntress (DC Comics)
- Hurricane (Miraculous: Tales of Ladybug and Cat Noir)
- Husk (Marvel Comics)

== I ==
- Ice (DC Comics)
- Icemaiden or Glacier (DC Comics)
- Indigo (DC Comics)
- Insect Queen (DC Comics)
- Invisible Woman (Marvel Comics)
- Invisigal (Dispatch)
- Natasha Irons (DC Comics)
- Isis (DC Comics)
- Irma Lair (W.I.T.C.H.)
- Ironheart (Marvel Comics)

== J ==
- Jade (DC Comics)
- Jalisco (Phoenix Studios)
- Jann of the Jungle (Marvel Comics)
- Jayna (DC Comics)
- Jem and the Holograms (Hasbro)
- Jen Starkey (Marvel Comics)
- Jess (Misfits)
- Jessica Priest (Image Comics)
- Jet (DC Comics)
- Jet (DC Comics - Wildstorm)
- Jetstream (Sky High)
- Kyoka Jiro (My Hero Academia)
- Jitter (Marvel Comics)
- Jocasta (Marvel Comics)
- Daisy Johnson (Marvel Comics)
- Jolt (Marvel Comics)
- Jessica Jones (Marvel Comics)
- Rhea Jones (a.k.a. Lodestone; DC Comics)
- Joystick (Marvel Comics)
- Jubilee (Marvel Comics)
- Judomaster (DC Comics)
- Jungle Girl (various)

== K ==
- Jennifer Kale (Marvel Comics)
- Kalliyankattu Neeli (Lokah Chapter 1: Chandra)
- Bette Kane (DC Comics)
- Nova Kane (First)
- Karma (Marvel Comics)
- Kasumi (a.k.a. Batgirl or Orphan; Cassandra Cain; DC Comics)
- Katana (DC Comics)
- Nemuri Kayama (My Hero Academia)
- Kelly (Misfits)
- Itsuka Kendo (My Hero Academia)
- Laurel Kent (DC Comics)
- Kid Flash (Iris West) (DC Comics)
- Kinetix (DC Comics)
- Gabby Kinney (Marvel Comics)
- Kismet (Marvel Comics)
- Kitten (Frank Z. Temerson; Holyoke Publishing)
- Misty Knight (Marvel Comics)
- Knightowl (Miraculous: Tales of Ladybug & Cat Noir)
- Knockout (DC Comics)
- Killer Frost (DC Comics)
- Kole (DC Comics)
- Komodo (Marvel Comics)
- Kratha (Virgin Comics)
- Krystala (ABS-CBN)
- Krystalin (Marvel Comics)

== L ==
- Lacuna (Marvel Comics)
- Lady Blackhawk (DC Comics)
- Lady Deadpool (Marvel Comics)
- Lady Death (Chaos Comics)
- Lady Luck (The Spirit Section)
- Ladybug (Miraculous: Tales of Ladybug & Cat Noir)
- Ladyhawk (Marvel Comics)
- Lara Croft
- Lexi Bunny (Loonatics Unleashed)
- Liberty (Paw Patrol: The Mighty Movie)
- Liberty Belle (DC Comics)
- Lifeguard (Marvel Comics)
- Lifter (Marvel Comics)
- Lightning (DC Comics)
- Light Lass (DC Comics)
- Lightspeed (Marvel Comics)
- Lilyfay (PJ Masks)
- Little Mermaid (DC Comics)
- Loa (Marvel Comics)
- Looker (DC Comics)
- Loquita (Phoenix Studios)
- La Lunatica (Marvel Comics)
- Lyja (a.k.a. Lazerfist and Ms. Fantastic; Marvel Comics; Marvel Comics - MC2)
- L'Oiselle (Serial novel)

== M ==
- M (Marvel Comics)
- Madame Mirage (Top Cow Productions)
- Madame Xanadu (DC Comics)
- Magdalena (Top Cow Productions)
- Magdalene (Marvel Comics)
- Magik (Marvel Comics)
- Magma (Marvel Comics)
- Majestia (Miraculous: Tales of Ladybug & Cat Noir)
- Makawalu Akana (a.k.a Spider-Girl) (Marvel Comics)
- Malevola (Dispatch)
- Manhunter (Kate Spencer) (DC Comics)
- Manitou Dawn (DC Comics)
- Manteau (DC Comics)
- Marrina (Marvel Comics)
- Marrow (Marvel Comics)
- Marvel Girl (Marvel Comics)
- Marvelous Maureen (Archie Comics)
- Mary Marvel (DC Comics)
- Aspen Matthews (Aspen Comics)
- Maxima (DC Comics)
- Maximum Ride (novel series and manga)
- Maya (DC Comics)
- Naomi McDuffie (DC Comics)
- Medusa (Marvel Comics)
- Mega Mindy
- Meggan (Marvel Comics)
- Melee (Marvel Comics)
- Melody (Bibleman)
- Menagerie (DC Comics)
- Mera (DC Comics)
- Mercury (Marvel Comics)
- Merry, Girl of 1000 Gimmicks (DC Comics)
- Mighty B
- Nico Minoru (Marvel Comics)
- Mirage (DC Comics)
- Miss America (DC Comics)
- Miss America (Marvel Comics)
- Miss Fury
- Miss Hound (Miraculous: Tales of Ladybug & Cat Noir)
- Miss Martian (DC Comics)
- Mockingbird (Marvel Comics)
- Monster Girl (Image Comics)
- Monstress (DC Comics)
- Moondragon (Marvel Comics)
- Moon Girl (Marvel Comics)
- Moon Maiden (DC Comics)
- Danielle Moonstar (Marvel Comics)
- Moonstone (Marvel Comics)
- Morgana Macawber (Darkwing Duck)
- Motormouth (Marvel Comics)
- Ms. Marvel (Carol Danvers; Marvel Comics)
- Ms. Marvel (Kamala Khan) (Marvel Comics)
- Ms. Marvel (Sharon Ventura; Marvel Comics)
- Ms. Mystic (originally Pacific Comics, then Continuity Comics)
- Ms. Thing (Marvel Comics)
- Ms. Victory
- Murmur (Marvel Comics)
- Musa (Winx Club)
- Mystek (DC Comics)
- Mystique (Marvel Comics)

== N ==
- Namora (Marvel Comics)
- Namorita (Marvel Comics)
- Natalie Gooch (Disney/Hyperion)
- Nature Girl (Marvel Comics)
- Negative Woman (DC Comics)
- Nelvana of the Northern Lights (Hillborough Studio)
- Nemesis (Marvel Comics)
- Nemesis (DC Comics)
- Neptunia (Darkwing Duck)
- Night Girl (DC Comics)
- Night Nurse (Marvel Comics)
- Nightshade (DC Comics)
- Nightstar (DC Comics)
- Nightveil (AC comics)
- Nikki (Marvel Comics)
- Nimona (HarperCollins)
- Nina Mazursky (DC Comics)
- Ninja-Rina (Disney/Hyperion)
- Nocturne (Marvel Comics)
- Nova (Frankie Raye) (Marvel Comics)
- Number Seven / The White Violin (Vanya Hargreeves) (The Umbrella Academy)
- Number Three / The Rumor (Allison Hargreeves) (The Umbrella Academy)
- Nurse Spex (Sky High)

== O ==
- Octobriana
- Aleta Ogord (see also Starhawk; Marvel Comics)
- Scarlet O'Neil (Newspaper Strip)
- Onyx (DC Comics)
- Oracle (DC Comics)
- Owlette (PJ Masks)
- Owlwoman (DC Comics)

== P ==
- Pantha (DC Comics)
- Violet Parr (The Incredibles)
- Penance (Marvel Comics)
- Petra (Marvel Comics)
- Sara Pezzini (Witchblade; Top Cow)
- Phantom Girl (DC Comics)
- Phantom Lady (Quality / DC Comics)
- Phoenix (Marvel Comics)
- Photon (a.k.a Captain Marvel or Spectrum, Monica Rambeau) (Marvel Comics)
- Summer Pickins (DC Comics)
- Pigella (Miraculous: Tales of Ladybug & Cat Noir)
- Pimp Killer (Artillery Network)
- Pixie (Marvel Comics)
- Poison Ivy (DC Comics)
- Polaris (as Overdrive; Marvel Comics))
- Polymouse (Miraculous: Tales of Ladybug & Cat Noir)
- Power Girl (DC Comics)
- Power Princess (Marvel Comics)
- Princess (Zoom)
- Princess Projectra a.k.a. Sensor (DC Comics)
- Prism (Dispatch)
- Promethea (America's Best Comics)
- Purple Flame (Deeper Learning Comics)
- Purple Tigress (Miraculous: Tales of Ladybug & Cat Noir)
- Kitty Pryde (Shadowcat, Ariel, Sprite) (Marvel Comics)
- Psylocke (Kwannon) (Marvel Comics)

== Q ==
- Jenny Quantum (DC Comics - Wildstorm)
- Jesse Quick (DC Comics)

== R ==
- Rachel Summers (a.k.a Marvel Girl, Prestige, Phoenix, Askani, Rachel Grey)
- Rad (AC Comics)
- Rainbow (Eclipse Comics)
- Rainbow Brite (Hallmark Comics)
- Raptor (Marvel Comics - MC2)
- Ratcatcher 2 (DC Comics - DCEU)
- Raven (DC Comics)
- Ren Kimura (Marvel Comics)
- Rena Rouge (Miraculous: Tales of Ladybug & Cat Noir)
- Renren (Miraculous Tales of Ladybug and Cat Noir)
- Red Guardian or Starlight (Marvel Comics)
- Red She-Hulk (Marvel Comics)
- Red Tornado (All-American Comics)
- Replica (Marvel Comics)
- Rescue (Marvel Comics)
- Revanche (Marvel Comics)
- Cecilia Reyes (Marvel Comics)
- Robin (Stephanie Brown and Carrie Kelley) (DC Comics)
- Rocket (DC Comics)
- Rogue (Marvel Comics)
- Ronin (Marvel Comics)
- Rose and Thorn (DC Comics)
- Rose Tattoo (DC Comics - Wildstorm)
- Rosebud (Super Buddies)
- Roxy (Winx Club)
- Royal Pain (Sky High)
- Ruca (Phoenix Studios)
- Ruby Summers (Marvel Comics)

== S ==
- Sabra (Marvel Comics)
- Sage (Marvel Comics)
- Sailor Moon (Kodansha manga)
- Saint Anna (Marvel Comics)
- Santa (Phoenix Studios)
- Sapphire (DC Comics)
- Saturn Girl (DC Comics)
- Savant (DC Comics - Wildstorm)
- Scaredycat (Marvel Comics)
- Scarlet Witch (Marvel Comics)
- Wendy Schulze (Freaks: You're One of Us)
- Scorpion (Carmilla Black) (Marvel Comics)
- Secret (DC Comics)
- Amanda Sefton (Marvel Comics)
- Selene (Underworld)
- Sepulchre (Marvel Comics)
- Serpentina (Marvel Comics)
- Sersi (Marvel Comics)
- Sexx Pistol (Artillery Network)
- Shadow Hunter (Virgin Comics)
- Shadow Lass (DC Comics)
- Shadoweyes (SLG Publishing)
- Shadowhawk (Image Comics)
- Shakti (Raj Comics)
- Shamrock (Marvel Comics)
- Shanna the She-Devil (Marvel Comics)
- Shard (Marvel Comics)
- She-Dragon (Image Comics - Highbrow Ent)
- She-Hulk (Marvel Comics)
- She-Hulk (Lyra) (Marvel Comics)
- She-Ra (television series)
- She-Thing (Marvel Comics)
- She-Venom (Marvel Comics)
- Sheena (Wags)
- Liz Sherman (Dark Horse, Hellboy)
- SheZow (television series)
- Shi (Crusade)
- Shikari (DC Comics)
- Shining Knight (Ystina) (DC Comics)
- Shrinking Rae (Image Comics - Invincible TV series)
- Shrinking Violet (DC Comics)
- Sif (Marvel Comics)
- Silencer (Marvel Comics)
- Silhouette (Marvel Comics)
- Silk (Marvel Comics)
- Silk Spectre (DC Comics)
- Silver Fox (Marvel Comics)
- Silver Sable (Marvel Comics)
- Silver Scorpion
- Silverclaw (Marvel Comics)
- Siryn (Marvel Comics)
- Skids (Marvel Comics)
- Skye (Paw Patrol: The Mighty Movie)
- Skyrocket (DC Comics)
- Snapdragon (Marvel Comics)
- Snowbird (Marvel Comics)
- Snowflake (Miraculous: Tales of Ladybug & Cat Noir)
- Songbird (Marvel Comics)
- Emma Sonnett (a.k.a. the 10th Muse) (various)
- Spanner (Marvel Comics - MC2)
- Jenny Sparks (DC Comics - Wildstorm)
- Sparx (DC Comics)
- Speedy (Mia Dearden) (DC Comics)
- Spider Girl (DC Comics)
- Spider-Girl (Marvel Comics - MC2)
- Spider-Gwen (Marvel Comics)
- Spider-Woman (Marvel Comics)
- Dorothy Spinner (DC Comics)
- Spitfire (Marvel Comics)
- Spoiler (DC Comics)
- Sprite (Marvel Comics)
- Spy Smasher (DC Comics)
- Squirrel Girl (Marvel Comics)
- Stacy X (Marvel Comics)
- Star Sapphire (DC Comics)
- Stardust (AC Comics)
- Starfire (DC Comics)
- Stargirl (DC Comics)
- Starlena (Garfield's Pet Force)
- Stature (Marvel Comics)
- Stella (Winx Club)
- Stepford Cuckoos (Marvel Comics)
- Storm (Marvel Comics)
- Stripperella
- Sun Girl (Marvel Comics)
- Sunpyre (Marvel Comics)
- Super Daisy (Disney Comics)
- Super Gran (TV series)
- SuperAvni (Deeper Learning Comics)
- Supergirl (DC Comics)
- Superwoman (DC Comics)
- Suprema (Awesome)
- Surge (Marvel Comics)
- Sway (Marvel Comics)
- Swift (DC Comics - Wildstorm)

== T ==
- Yu Takeyama (My Hero Academia)
- Talisman (Alpha Flight) (Marvel Comics)
- Tara (Marvel Comics)
- Taranee Cook (W.I.T.C.H.)
- Tecna (Winx Club)
- Tempo (Marvel Comics)
- Tempus (Marvel Comics)
- Gwen Tennyson (Ben 10)
- Traci Thirteen (DC Comics)
- Thor (Jane Foster; Marvel Comics)
- Thor Girl (Marvel Comics)
- Thornn (Marvel Comics)
- Thunder (DC Comics)
- Jonni Thunder (DC Comics)
- Barb Thunderman (The Thundermans)
- Chloe Thunderman (The Thundermans)
- Nora Thunderman (The Thundermans)
- Phoebe Thunderman (The Thundermans)
- Thundra (Marvel Comics)
- Tigra (Marvel Comics)
- Tigress (DC Comics)
- Timeslip (Marvel Comics)
- Titaness (Mansion Comics)
- Setsuna Tokage (My Hero Academia)
- Tomorrow Woman (DC Comics)
- Topaz (Malibu Comics)
- Topaz (Marvel Comics)
- Touriya Naji (sarcasm comics)
- Toxyn (Marvel Comics)
- Transonic (Marvel Comics)
- Triplicate Girl (DC Comics)
- Donna Troy (DC Comics)
- Trinary (Marvel Comics)
- Tsunami (DC Comics)
- Kagami Tsurugi / Ryuko (Miraculous: Tales of Ladybug & Cat Noir)
- Katma Tui (DC Comics)
- Turbo (Marvel Comics)
- Toph Beifong (AVATAR THE LAST AIRBENDER)

== U ==
- U-Go Girl (Marvel Comics)
- Uncanny Valley (Miraculous: Tales of Ladybug & Cat Noir)
- Ochaco Uraraka (My Hero Academia)
- Rumi Usagiyama (My Hero Academia)

== V ==
- Valda the Iron Maiden (DC Comics)
- Valkyrie (Marvel Comics)
- Vampire by Night (Marvel Comics)
- Vampirella (Dynamite Entertainment)
- Varga (Bulaklak Magazine)
- Veil (Marvel Comics)
- Velocity (Top Cow: Cyberforce)
- Venus (Marvel Comics)
- Venus Dee Milo (Marvel Comics)
- Vesperia (Miraculous: Tales of Ladybug & Cat Noir)
- Victory (Miraculous: Tales of Ladybug & Cat Noir)
- Vigilante (Patricia Tryce; DC Comics)
- Vindicator (Marvel Comics)
- Vixen (DC Comics)
- Vogue (VeggieTales)
- Vogue (various)
- Void (DC Comics - Wildstorm)
- Voyd/Karen (Incredibles franchise)
- Voodoo (DC Comics - Wildstorm: WildCats)

== W ==
- Jakita Wagner (DC Comics - Wildstorm: Planetary)
- Jenny Wakeman (My Life as a Teenage Robot)
- Wallflower (Marvel Comics)
- War Woman (Image Comics)
- Wasp (Marvel Comics)
- Wave (Marvel Comics)
- Weaver (Worm)
- Web Woman (Filmation)
- WhirlGirl (Web series title character)
- White Witch (DC Comics)
- Wicked (Marvel Comics)
- Wildcat (DC Comics)
- Wild Thing (Marvel Comics - MC2)
- Wilhelmina Vandom (W.I.T.C.H.)
- WilyKit (ThunderCats)
- Wind Dancer (Marvel Comics)
- Colleen Wing (Marvel Comics)
- Winged Victory (Astro City)
- Witchblade (Top Cow Productions)
- Witchfire (DC Comics)
- Witchfire (Marvel Comics)
- Wolfsbane (Marvel Comics)
- The Woman in Red (Standard Comics)
- Wonder (Zoom)
- Wonder Girl (DC Comics)
- Wonder Twins (DC Comics)
- Wonder Woman (DC Comics)
- WordGirl (television series' title character)

== X ==
- X-23 (Marvel Comics)
- Xena Warrior Princess (Darkhorse Comics)
- Xenia (Guardians)
- XS (DC Comics)

== Y ==
- Yaira (Rippaverse Comics)
- Momo Yaoyorozu (My Hero Academia)
- Gertrude Yorkes (Marvel Comics)
- Yellowjacket (Rita DeMara) (Marvel Comics)

== Z ==
- Zatanna (DC Comics)
- Zealot (DC Comics - Wildstorm)

== See also ==
- Girl Heroes
- List of female supervillains
- List of woman warriors in folklore, literature and popular culture
- Magical girl
- Portrayal of women in American comics
- Superheroine
