= List of female supervillains =

This is a list of female supervillains that can be found in American comic books and associated mediums. They are a counterpart to the superheroine, just as the villain is the counterpart to the hero.

== Comic books ==
=== Marvel Comics ===
==== Avengers villains ====
- Alkhema
- Bombshell
- Dragonfly
- Gladiatrix
- Lascivious
- Letha
- Man-Killer
- Nightshade
- Poundcakes
- Princess Python
- Ruby Thursday
- Terminatrix
- Umar
- Viper
- Volcana
- Yellowjacket

==== Black Widow villains ====
- Black Lotus
- Iron Maiden
- Snapdragon
- Wrangler

==== Captain America villains ====
- Anaconda
- Asp
- Black Mamba
- Black Racer
- Coachwhip
- Diamondback
- Fer-de-Lance
- Mysteria
- Sin
- Superia

==== Captain Marvel villains ====
- Moonstone

==== Cosmic villains ====
- Aegis
- Nebula

==== Daredevil villains ====
- Lady Bullseye
- Shock
- Typhoid Mary

==== Ghost Rider villains ====
- Hag
- Heart Attack
- Lillith
- Steel Wind
- Witch Woman

==== Hulk villains ====
- Harpy
- Mercy
- Vapor
- Water Witch

==== Iron Man villains ====
- Crimson Cowl
- Madame Masque

==== She-Hulk villains ====
- Abominatrix
- Figment
- Silencer
- Southpaw
- Titania
- Ultima
- Unum

==== Spider-Man villains ====
- Aura
- Beetle
- Bloodlust
- Electro
- Joystick
- Knockout
- Kraven the Hunter (Ana Kravinoff)
- Lady Octopus
- Medea
- Menace
- Mindblast
- Paper Doll
- Poison
- Scorpia
- Scream
- Screwball
- Shriek
- Stunner
- Whiplash
- White Rabbit

==== Spider-Woman villains ====
- Dansen Macabre
- Gypsy Moth/Skein
- Morgan le Fay
- Nekra

==== Thor villains ====
- Enchantress
- Hela
- Karnilla
- Lorelei
- Quicksand

==== X-Men villains ====
- Acolytes (Amelia Voght, Anne-Marie Cortez, Gargouille, Static, Unuscione)
- Adrienne Frost
- Arcadia DeVille
- Arkea
- Andrea von Strucker
- Arclight
- Astra
- Bella Donna
- Birdy
- Siena Blaze
- Blindspot
- Candra
- Cassandra Nova
- Chimera
- Copycat
- Cylla Markham
- Dark Phoenix
- Deathbird
- Destiny
- Emma Frost
- Famine
- Fatale
- Hell's Belles
- Hellions (Catseye, Roulette, Tarot)
- Hag
- Harness
- Haven
- Hordeculture
- Infectia
- Joanna Cargill (as Frenzy)
- Kimura
- Lady Deathstrike
- Lady Mastermind
- Leper Queen
- Lifeforce
- Lorelei
- Madelyne Pryor (as the Goblin Queen)
- Malice
- Miss Locke
- Mother Righteous
- Moira X
- Mortis
- Mutant Liberation Front (Dragoness, Strobe, Tempo, Thumbelina)
- Mystique
- Omega Flight (Delphine Courtney, Diamond Lil, Miss Mass, Tech-Noir)
- Omega Sentinel
- Phantazia
- Pink Pearl
- Rogue
- Saturnyne
- Selene
- Spiral
- Technet (Bodybag, China Doll, Fascination, Gatecrasher, Ringtoss)
- Vertigo
- Zaladane and the Savage Land Mutates (Leash, Lupa, Whiteout)

==== Other Marvel villains ====
- Lucia von Bardas
- Bloodtide
- Dragonrider
- Ecstasy
- Ereshkigal
- Fault Zone
- Foxfire
- Gilded Lily
- Delphyne Gorgon
- Femme Fatales
- Gazelle
- Hera
- Hippolyta
- Impala
- Inferno
- Ion
- Javelynn
- Lady Dorma
- Lodestone
- Magneta
- Mercy
- Paragon
- Pretty Persuasions
- Shiklah
- Sphinx
- Spider-Woman (Charlotte Witter)
- Stained Glass Scarlet
- Terraxia
- Vertigo
- The Wink

=== DC Comics ===
==== Aquaman villains ====
- Siren

==== Batman villains ====
- Duela Dent
- Harley Quinn
- Magpie
- March Harriet
- Orca
- Phantasm
- Poison Ivy
- Punchline
- Talia al Ghul
- Roxy Rocket

==== Flash villains ====
- Golden Glider
- Magenta
- Killer Frost
- Reverse-Flash
- Savitar

==== Green Arrow villains ====
- China White
- Cupid
- Onyx
- Shado

==== New Gods villains ====
- Amazing Grace
- Bernadeth
- Bloody Mary
- Gilotina
- Granny Goodness
- Knockout
- Lashina

==== Superman villains ====
- Faora
- Livewire
- Maxima
- Silver Banshee
- Ursa

==== Teen Titans villains ====
- Blackfire
- Cheshire
- H.I.V.E.
- Jinx
- Madame Rouge
- Rose Wilson
- Shimmer
- Terra

==== Wonder Woman villains ====
- Astarte
- Blue Snowman
- Cassie Arnold
- Cheetah
- Circe
- Dark Angel
- Decay
- Devastation
- Disdain
- Doctor Cyber
- Doctor Poison
- Eviless
- Fausta Grables
- Genocide
- Giganta
- Gundra the Valkyrie
- Hecate
- Hypnota
- The Mask
- Medusa
- Osira
- Paula von Gunther
- Queen Atomia
- Queen Clea
- Queen Mikra
- Queen of Fables
- Sharkeeta
- Silver Swan
- Trinity
- Veronica Cale
- Zara

==== Other DC villains ====
- Bizarra
- Blacksmith
- Blaze
- Bleez
- Deuce
- Divine
- Double Dare
- Emerald Empress
- Enchantress
- Enigma
- Fatality
- Fright
- Gamemnae
- Gemini
- Glorith
- Godiva
- Goldilocks
- Harlequin
- Hazard
- Heggra
- Hyena
- Indigo
- Inque
- Jeannette
- Jewelee
- Killer Frost
- Lady Clay
- Lady Shiva
- Lady Vic
- Lazara
- Leather
- Mindboggler
- Mist
- New Wave
- Nocturna
- Nyssa Raatko
- Paula Brooks as Tigress
- Phobia
- Plastique
- Prank
- Queen Bee
- Rampage
- Riddler's Daughter
- Roulette
- Saturn Queen
- Scandal Savage
- She-Bat
- Spider Girl
- Star Sapphire
- Sun Girl
- Superwoman (Crime Syndicate of America
- Tala
- Tigress
- Viper
- Ventriloquist

=== Other comics ===
- Angelus (Image Comics)
- Animora (Mystic)
- Bomb Queen (Image Comics)
- Celestine (Image Comics)
- Dragon Lady
- Evinlea (Negation)
- Fem Paragon (Femforce)
- Ingra (The First)
- Jessica Priest (Image Comics)
- Karai
- Mai Shen (Scion)
- Mothergod (Valiant Comics)
- Nyx (Image Comics)
- Sailor Galaxia (Kodansha manga)
- Rad (Femforce)
- Tiffany (Image Comics)
- Valentina (from Darna)
- Viscerator (Image Comics)
- Zera (Image Comics)

== American animation ==
=== 2D ===
- Baby Doll (Batman: The Animated Series)
- Baroness (G.I. Joe)
- Camilla (Kim Possible)
- Cobra (Big Hero 6: The Series)
- Doctor Blight (Captain Planet and the Planeteers)
- Eletronique (Kim Possible)
- Eris (The Grim Adventures of Billy & Mandy)
- Frightwig, Rojo, and Charmcaster (Ben 10)
- Galatea (Justice League Unlimited)
- Greta von Gruesome (Larryboy: The Cartoon Adventures)
- Ample Grime (Darkwing Duck)
- High Voltage (Big Hero 6: The Series)
- Lady Kale (Princess Gwenevere and the Jewel Riders)
- Momakase (Big Hero 6: The Series)
- Morgana (Princess Gwenevere and the Jewel Riders)
- Mrs. Clayface (DC Super Hero Girls)
- Penelope Spectra and Ember McLain (Danny Phantom)
- Ammonia Pine (Darkwing Duck)
- Princess Morbucks (The Powerpuff Girls)
- Sedusa and Femme Fatale (The Powerpuff Girls)
- Shego (Kim Possible)
- Supersonic Sue (Big Hero 6: The Series)
- Talon (Static Shock)
- Wuya (Xiaolin Showdown)
- Yzma (The Emperor's New School)
- Zarana (G.I. Joe)

=== 3D ===
- Carly (PJ Masks)
- Daemon (ReBoot)
- Empress of Unhappiness (Bibleman)
- Evelyn Deavor (Incredibles 2)
- Hexadecimal (ReBoot)
- Lab Rat (SuperKitties)
- Lamprey (Shadow Raiders)
- Luna Girl (PJ Masks)
- Octobella (PJ Masks)
- Scarlet Overkill (Minions)
- The Bad Apple (VeggieTales)
- The Baroness (Bibleman)
- The Grand Duchess of Greed (Bibleman)
- Zsa Zsa (SuperKitties)

== Live action TV ==
- Astronema (Power Rangers Lost Galaxy)
- Azkadellia (Tin Man)
- Chase (Blade: The Series)
- Christine White (The 10th Kingdom)
- Divatox (Power Rangers Turbo)
- I.M. Wonderful (Bibleman)
- Irina Derevko (Alias)
- Ice (The Amazing Extraordinary Friends)
- Madam Glitz (Bibleman)
- Gossip Queen (Bibleman)
- Raina (Cleopatra 2525)

== Other ==
- Coupé, Invisibitch, Malevola, Prism (Dispatch)

== See also ==
- Femme fatale
- List of female superheroes
- Supervillain
- Villain
