= SuperBabes: The Femforce Role-Playing Game =

1993 superhero role-playing game

SuperBabes: The Femforce Role-Playing Game is a superhero role-playing game published by Selex in 1993 that is based on the Femforce comic published by AC Comics.

== Gameplay ==
SuperBabes: The Femforce Role-Playing Game is a game in which the players take on roles of superheroes from the Femforce comics such as Nightveil, Ms. Victory, and Garganta. There are also rules to create new characters.

=== Character creation ===
Players build a new character's abilities using a pool of creation points. The first step is to buy an origin from options such as Adventuress, Artificial Being, and Supernatural Accident. Next, creation points are added to the seven attributes (Muscles, Health, Moves, Looks, Brains, Will, and Personality). The balance of creation points are spent on super powers, skills and special equipment.

=== Combat and skill resolution ===
A twenty-sided die is used to resolve most skill and combat checks. If multiple skills are used at the same time, percentile dice are thrown instead.

=== Bimbo points ===
If a character earns one Bimbo point, her superpowers will work at maximum effect with no need for a die roll. Two Bimbo points allow the character to accomplish normally impossible actions. As critic Lester W. Smith pointed out, "This lets players simulate the wahoo actions and deus ex machina resolutions common to comic-book adventures." The maximum number of Bimbo points a character can earn in an adventure is three.

At the start of each adventure, the gamemaster secretly rolls a twenty-sided die and if the result is equal to or less than the number of Bimbo points a character has, those points are wiped clean, and a special random Bimbo Event happens that has negative consequences for the character.

== Reception ==
In Issue 57 of White Wolf Inphobia, Sean Holland commented "While I believe that the authors achieved their goal of creating a fast and easy RPG, I think they dropped in too much silliness along the way. If you're interested in a lighthearted (and a bit lightweight) superhero RPG, Super Babes might be for you." Holland concluded by rating it a 3 out of 5.

In Issue 208 of Dragon, Lester W. Smith found much to like, commenting, "The writing throughout the game is light and entertaining, with friendly editorial comments inserted here are there for illumination or amusement. The system seems to hold together nicely, accommodating a wide range of abilities and power levels. Most impressively, the rules cover their subject with relative simplicity — this in an easy game to play." Smith did note that the components were cheaply and poorly made. Smith concluded by giving the game a rating of 4 out of 6.
