= 1949 in radio =

The year 1949 saw a number of significant events in radio broadcasting history.

== Events ==
- 2 January – The Jack Benny Program first appears on CBS after 16 years on NBC – one of the most visible results of CBS' "talent raids."
- 1 April – The facilities and staff of the Broadcasting Corporation of Newfoundland are transferred to the Canadian Broadcasting Corporation on the former British colony joining Canada as its 10th province.
- 15 April – KPFA 94.1 FM in Berkeley, California, begins broadcasting as the first listener-sponsored radio station in the United States and the first of five stations founded by the Pacifica Radio network.
- 23 November – James Lindenberg branches into radio broadcasting with the official launch of DZBC 1000 kilohertz on AM, owned by Bolinao Electronics Corporation (the predecessor of ABS-CBN Corporation) in the Philippines.

== Debuts ==
=== Programs ===
- January 9 – Screen Directors Playhouse premieres on NBC.
- January 31 – Book at Bedtime debuts on the BBC Light Programme.
- February 11 – Yours Truly, Johnny Dollar (1949–1962) debuts on CBS.
- February 27 – Broadway Is My Beat debuts on CBS.
- April 4 – Ray's a Laugh debuts on the BBC Light Programme.
- April 24 - Richard Diamond, Private Detective debuts on NBC.
- May 1 – The Adventures of Frank Race, a syndicated program, debuts in some markets.
- May 7 – The Affairs of Peter Salem debuts on Mutual.
- June 3 – Dragnet premieres on NBC.
- June 5 - The Green Lama premieres on CBS.
- June 18 - Murder by Experts premieres on Mutual.
- June 29 – Candy Matson debuts on NBC West Coast.
- July 3 – Four Star Playhouse debuts on NBC.
- July 4
  - Add a Line debuts on ABC.
  - Leave It to Joan debuts on CBS.
  - Young Love debuts on CBS.
- August 1 - Make Believe Town debuts on CBS.
- August 25 – Father Knows Best debuts on NBC.
- September 4 – Chance of a Lifetime debuts on ABC.
- September 5 – Light-Up Time debuts on NBC.
- November 4 - Crime Correspondent debuts on CBS.

=== Stations ===
- January 25 – Bayerischer Rundfunk is reconstituted from Munich Radio in West Germany. This year it establishes the Bavarian Radio Symphony Orchestra.
- February 22 – KWPC-FM (99.7 FM) of Muscatine, Iowa, with a broadcasting power of 3,000 watts, signs on the air as a sister station of KWPC-AM (860 AM). Studios are located on the outskirts of Muscatine.
- June 26 – WWON-FM/105.5-Woonsocket, Rhode Island, begins broadcasting at 390 watts. It is the sister station of WWON/1240 in the same community.
- September 10 — WJMA/1340-Orange, Virginia, begins broadcasting with 250 watts full time.
- December 11 – KALA/1400-Sitka, Alaska, begins broadcasting. The owner is Baranof Enterprises.
- December 22 – WPEP/1570-Taunton, Massachusetts, begins broadcasting from studios atop the Roseland Ballroom, north of downtown Taunton.

== Closings ==
- January 2 – Cabin B-13 ends its run on network radio (CBS).
- January 9 – WWDX-FM, Paterson, New Jersey, ceases broadcasting.
- April 17 – Manhattan Merry-Go-Round ends its run on network radio (NBC Blue Network).
- May 29 - Electric Theatre ends its run on network radio (CBS).
- June 4 – The Adventures of Frank Merriwell ends its run on network radio (NBC).
- June 5 – The Alan Young Show ends its run on network radio (NBC).
- June 10 – Herb Shriner Time ends its run on network radio (CBS).
- June 25 – Famous Jury Trials ends its run on network radio in the United States.
- June 27 - Child's World ends its run on network radio (ABC).
- July 1 - Ford Theater (radio series) ends its run on network radio (NBC).
- July 3 – Mayor of the Town ends its run on network radio.
- August 20 - The Green Lama ends its run on network radio (CBS).
- August 22 – Leave It to Joan ends its run on network radio (CBS).
- September 4 – The Burl Ives Show ends its run on network radio (ABC).
- September 25 – Call the Police ends its run on network radio (CBS).
- September 26 – Add a Line ends its run on network radio (ABC).
- October 28 – The Abe Burrows Show ends its run on CBS.
- December 15 – Captain Midnight ends its run on network radio Mutual.
- December 25 - The House of Mystery ends its run on network radio Mutual.

== Births ==
- February 7 – Les Ross, né Meakin, English midlands DJ.
- March 12 – David Mellor, English politician and radio presenter.
- April 2 – Paul Gambaccini, American-born British music presenter.
- April 20 – Paul Heiney, English broadcaster.
- May 22 – Jesse Lee Peterson, American political radio host.
- November 23 – Tom Joyner, American radio host
- November – Neal Conan, American NPR host, producer, editor and correspondent, captured during the 1991 Gulf War by the Iraqi Republican Guard (died 2021)
- December 12 – Bill Nighy, English actor.
- Philip Dodd, English creative arts academic and broadcaster.
- David Stafford, English writer and broadcaster.

== Deaths ==
- January 9 – Tommy Handley, English comedian (born 1892).
- February 15 – Patricia Ryan, American actress (born 1921); she was stricken with a severe headache the night before while performing in a broadcast of Cavalcade of America, and her husband found her dead the next morning at home.
- June 10 – Sir Frederick Ogilvie, British broadcasting executive and university administrator (born 1893).
