= Rik Levins =

American comic book artist

Richard "Rik" Levins (October 10, 1950 - June 12, 2010) was an American comic book artist and penciller, best known for his work on Marvel Comics' Captain America, where he worked with writer Mark Gruenwald for over three years (1991–1994). During the years he worked with Gruenwald, they co-created characters such as Superia.

Other titles he contributed to include Marvels' Avengers, AC Comics' Americomics and Femforce, and his own creator-owned series, Dragonfly.

After working in the comic book industry, he moved to the computer game industry. He worked at the game company N-Space, where he contributed art to game such as Danger Girl, Die Hard Trilogy 2: Viva Las Vegas, and Duke Nukem: Land of the Babes.

After leaving N-Space, Rik began working at Full Sail University.

Levins died on June 12, 2010.

== Comic book credits ==
Marvel

- Avengers Vol 1 #319 - 325 Credits: Penciller
- Avengers West Coast Vol 1 #65 - 66 Credits: Penciller
- Captain America Vol 1 # 387 - 393 Credits: Penciller
- Captain America Vol 1 # 394 - 422 Credits: Penciller, Cover Artist
- Captain America Annual Vol 1 13 Credits: Penciller
- Destroyer Vol 1 # 7 & 9 Credits: Penciller
- Marvel Holiday Special Vol 1 1992 Credits: Penciller
- Sensational She-Hul Vol 1 #47 Credits: Penciller
- What if...? Vol 1 #10 & 25 Credits: Penciller

Valiant/Acclaim

- H.A.R.D. Corps # 17 Date: APR / 1994 Credits: Penciller
- H.A.R.D. Corps # 18 (with card) Date: MAY / 1994 Credits: Penciller, Cover Artist
- H.A.R.D. Corps # 19 Date: JUN / 1994 Credits: Penciller, Cover Artist
- H.A.R.D. Corps # 20 Date: AUG / 1994 Credits: Penciller, Cover Artist
- H.A.R.D. Corps # 21 Date: SEP / 1994 Credits: Cover Artist
- H.A.R.D. Corps # 22 Date: OCT / 1994 Credits: Cover Artist
- H.A.R.D. Corps # 23 Date: NOV / 1994 Credits: Cover Artist
- H.A.R.D. Corps # 24 Date: DEC / 1994 Credits: Cover Artist
- Solar, Man of the Atom # 44 Date: MAY / 1995 Credits: Penciller
- Solar, Man of the Atom # 45 Date: JUN / 1995 Credits: Penciller
- X-O Manowar # 1/2 Date: NOV / 1994 Credits: Artist
- X-O Manowar # 1/2 GOLD Date: NOV / 1994 Credits: Artist
- X-O Manowar # 26 Date: MAR / 1994 Credits: Penciller
- X-O Manowar # 27 Date: APR / 1994 Credits: Penciller, Cover Artist
- X-O Manowar # 28 (with card) Date: MAY / 1994 Credits: Penciller, Cover Artist
- X-O Manowar # 29 Date: JUN / 1994 Credits: Penciller, Cover Artist
- X-O Manowar # 30 Date: AUG / 1994 Credits: Penciller, Cover Artist
- X-O Manowar # 31 Date: SEP / 1994 Credits: Penciller, Cover Artist
- X-O Manowar # 32 Date: OCT / 1994 Credits: Penciller, Cover Artist
- X-O Manowar # 33 Date: NOV / 1994 Credits: Penciller, Cover Artist
- X-O Manowar # 34 Date: DEC / 1994 Credits: Penciller, Cover Artist
- X-O Manowar # 35 Date: JAN / 1995 Credits: Penciller, Cover Artist
- X-O Manowar # 36 (with SP card) Date: FEB / 1995 Credits: Penciller, Cover Artist
- X-O Manowar # 37 Date: MAR / 1995 Credits: Penciller
- X-O Manowar # 38 Date: MAR / 1995 Credits: Penciller
- X-O Manowar # 39 Date: MAR / 1995 Credits: Penciller
- X-O Manowar # 40 Date: MAR / 1995 Credits: Penciller
