= Strong female character =

Stock character

The strong female character is a stock character, the opposite of the damsel in distress. In the first half of the 20th century, the rise of mainstream feminism and the increased use of the concept in the later 20th century have reduced the concept to a standard item of pop culture fiction. This narrative cliche is separate and distinct from the notion of a female character who is well written, granted some form of agency, and whose actions and desires occupy a central place in the story in a way that is unusual in the history of women in literature and women in film.

Whether female characters are strong enough is often used as a gauge of story quality by critics, in a similar manner to whether the story passes the Bechdel test. However, some have criticized this metric for causing authors to avoid creating female characters with realistic weaknesses. The female characters that fall into this trope are often reduced to having one dimension with little development throughout their arc.

== Traits ==
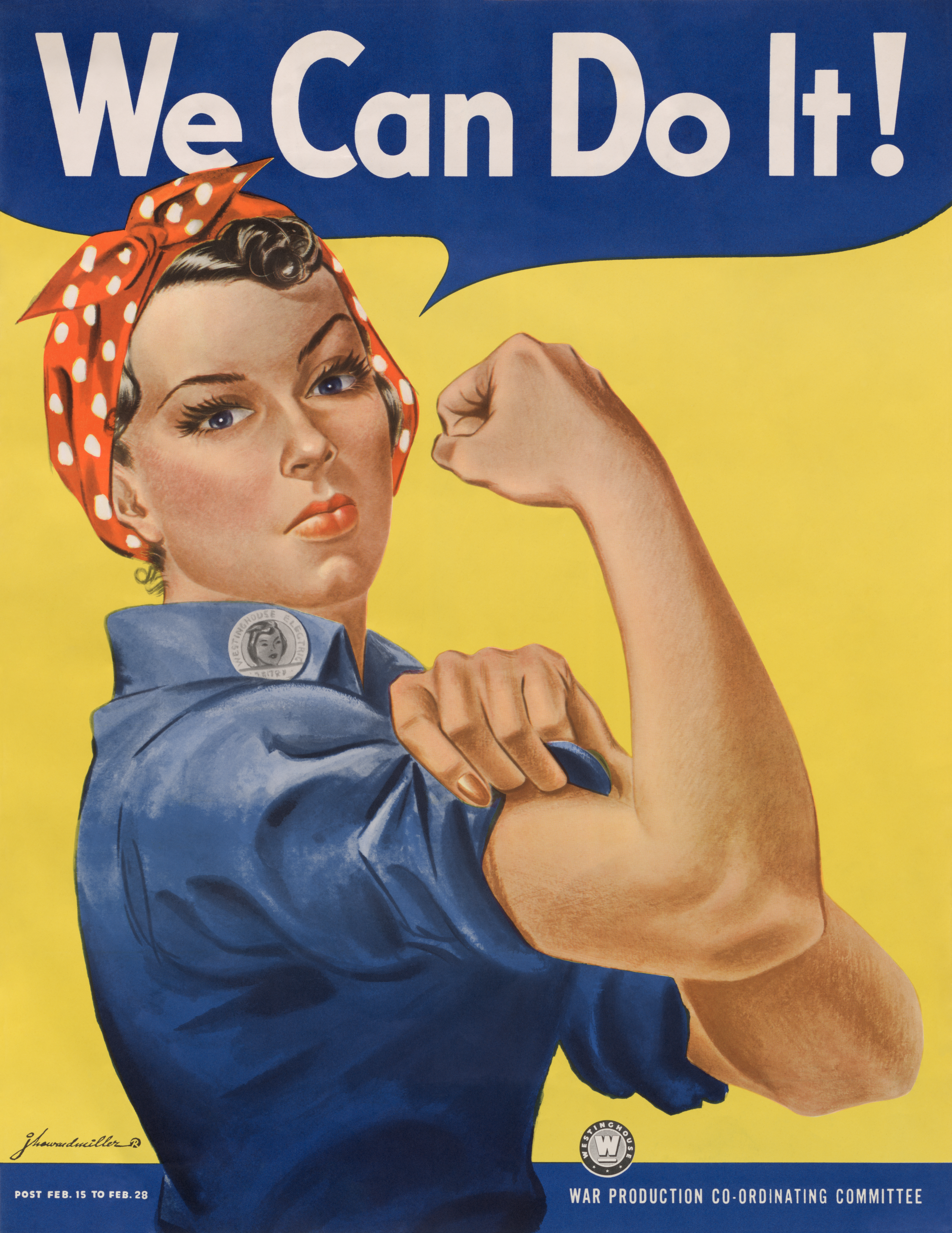
Physical strength is a common trait of strong female characters, although the phrase refers to self-control

According to Carina Chocano, the strong female character has become a "cinematic cliché", resulting in character archetypes like the "alpha professional" whose laser-like focus on career advancement has caused her to become a "grim, celibate automaton", and the "gloomy ninja with commitment issues". By this metric, the strong female character is a woman with the gendered behavior taken out. This is a contrast to the traditional way women are displayed in media, Brooke Shapiro suggests in her research that the scarce times women are at the forefront of the story, they are generally portrayed with the patriarchal ideologies of being emotional and codependent. There is no clear consensus on the definition of "strong female character". Alexandria Gonzales notes that the characters that fall under this category are often described with traditionally masculine characteristics.

Another way this is shown is that the strong female character is sometimes distanced from femininity is by subverting the physical characteristics audiences have come to expect from female characters. For example, the titular character in Mulan famously rejects her feminine appearance to become a warrior by cutting her long hair with a sword. Some believe it describes characters with powerful physical abilities, such as those of Buffy Summers or Katniss Everdeen. Others believe it to represent the quality of a character's "inner life" and their relative importance in the story.

== Criticism ==
Although the archetype arose largely through feminism, it has not been universally well received by those supportive of women's rights. Sophia McDougall of the New Statesman has criticized the high prevalence of strong female characters for creating a cliché that represents women as unrealistically strong; she argues that the simplicity of this archetype does little to present women in media in a realistic, complex way. She points out that "Sherlock Holmes gets to be brilliant, solitary, abrasive, Bohemian, whimsical, brave, sad, manipulative, neurotic, vain, untidy, fastidious, artistic, courteous, rude, a polymath genius. Female characters get to be Strong". In analyzing characters that fall under this archetype, it was shown that they are often created with a narrow, male-influenced features that stereotype what it means to be strong. When these roles are displayed with a small scope of characteristics, it becomes the default expectation for what a woman should be while leaving so many other types of women underrepresented.

Carina Chocano from The New York Times has offered similar criticism for the "shorthand meme" of strong female characters; while she sees them as a "gateway drug" to realistic representation, she takes offense at the implication that female characters are "not interesting or worth identifying with" if they are not cold, flawless, and "masculine". In contrast, Alison Willmore of BuzzFeed takes issue with popular interpretation of the word "strong" rather than with the archetype itself; she prefers strong female characters in the sense of well-developed ones given a legitimate point of view over "badass" ones. Kelly Faircloth of the feminist blog Jezebel believes that strong female characters are not enough or required, but that women must have integral roles in the plot apart from helping men realize theirs (rather than, "seamlessly replace[able] with a floor lamp").

Over time, these criticisms and a new wave of feminism that has grown tired of "strong" being a female protagonists' only dimension has led huge production studios like The Walt Disney Company to usher in a new wave of female characters that have more to them than being princesses. For example, 2021's Raya and the Last Dragon features a story surrounding the relationships and growth of a dynamic group of female leads.

== See also ==
- Bad girl art – Comic book trend of the 1980s/90s
- Bond girl – Female love interest or sidekick of James Bond
- Final girl – Trope in slasher horror films
- Girl power – Slogan encouraging women's empowerment
- Girls with guns – Sub-genre of action films and animation
- List of female action heroes
- List of superheroines
- Mary Sue – Overly competent fictional character
- Media and gender – Relationship between mass media and gender
- Women warriors in literature and culture – Archetypal figure
