= Spark Publications =

Defunct American comic book publisher

- Status: defunct (1946)
- Founded: 1944
- Country of origin: United States
- Headquarters location: Springfield, Massachusetts
- Key people: Jerry Robinson, Mort Meskin
- Publication types: Comic books
- Fiction genres: superhero
- Imprints: Fact & Fiction Publications

Spark Publications was a short-lived comic book publisher in the mid-1940s, during the Golden Age of Comic Books. The company was established and owned by Ken Crossen, who was the creator and writer of the Green Lama. Most of their comics was produced by a studio run by Jerry Robinson and Mort Meskin. Other creators who worked for Spark included Joseph Greene and Mac Raboy. The combination of Robinson, Meskin, and Raboy, using similar styles, gave Spark's books a sort of house style.

During their short existence Spark put out fifteen issues of three titles: two issues of Atoman, eight of The Green Lama (a series they picked up from Crestwood Publications), and five of Golden Lad.

Solely a publisher of superhero comics, the company was too small to survive the shrinking of the market post-World War II.

== Characters ==
- Atoman
- Golden Girl
- Golden Lad
- Green Lama (first published by Crestwood/Prize Comics and in pulp magazines)
- Lieutenant Hercules
- Magga the Magnificent
- Marvin the Great
- Shaman & Flame
- Swift Arrow

== Titles published ==
- Atoman Comics (2 issues, 1946)
- Golden Lad (5 issues, 1945–46)
- Green Lama (8 issues, 1944–46)
