= Minions (film) =

2015 American animated film

- Theatrical release poster
- Directed by: Pierre Coffin; Kyle Balda
- Written by: Brian Lynch
- Produced by: Chris Meledandri; Janet Healy
- Starring: Sandra Bullock; Jon Hamm; Michael Keaton; Allison Janney; Steve Coogan; Jennifer Saunders; Geoffrey Rush
- Edited by: Claire Dodgson
- Music by: Heitor Pereira
- Production companies: Universal Pictures; Illumination Entertainment
- Distributed by: Universal Pictures
- Release dates: June 11, 2015 (Odeon Leicester Square,London); July 10, 2015 (United States)
- Running time: 91 minutes
- Country: United States
- Language: English
- Budget: $74 million
- Box office: $1.159 billion

Minions is a 2015 American animated comedy film directed by Pierre Coffin and Kyle Balda and written by Brian Lynch. Produced by Universal Pictures and Illumination Entertainment, it is a spin-off and prequel to Despicable Me (2010), the first installment in the Minions film series, and the third overall installment in the Despicable Me franchise. The film features the voices of Coffin (as the Minions), Sandra Bullock, Jon Hamm, Michael Keaton, Allison Janney, Steve Coogan, Jennifer Saunders, and Geoffrey Rush as the narrator. In the film, the Minions search for their replaceable evil boss after, one-by-one, accidentally killing all their past leaders throughout history.

Minions premiered at the Odeon Leicester Square in London on June 11, 2015, and was theatrically released in the United States on July 10, by Universal Pictures. It received mixed reviews from critics and grossed $1.16 billion, finishing its theatrical run as the fifth-highest-grossing film of 2015, the second-highest-grossing animated film and the tenth-highest-grossing film of all time. A sequel, Minions: The Rise of Gru, was released in 2022.

== Plot ==
Minions are small, yellow pill-shaped creatures which have existed since the beginning of time, evolving from single-celled organisms into beings which exist only to serve history's most despicable masters, but they are very clumsy and end up accidentally killing every boss they work for like a Tyrannosaurus, a caveman, a pharaoh, and Count Dracula. They are driven into isolation after firing a cannon at Napoleon while in Russia and start a new life inside a cave, but after many years, the Minions become sad and unmotivated without a boss to serve. This prompts three Minions, named Kevin, Stuart and Bob, to embark on a quest to find the next boss for their tribe to follow.

In 1968, the three end up in New York City and stay at a department store for the night, where they come across a hidden commercial broadcast advertising Villain-Con, an Orlando convention for all villains. The next day, they hitchhike a ride to the convention with the Nelsons, a family of thieves. At the convention, they meet Scarlet Overkill, the world's first female supervillain, who unexpectedly hires them and takes them to her home in London. They phone the rest of the Minions to get them to join. Scarlet plans to steal the Imperial State Crown from Queen Elizabeth II, promising to reward the Minions if they succeed, but also threatening to kill them if they fail.

Scarlet's husband Herb supplies them with inventions to aid in the heist, but they are nearly caught while breaking into the Tower of London. During the subsequent chase, Bob runs into the Sword in the Stone and pulls it free to defend himself and his friends, removing the Queen from the throne and making Bob the new King. Enraged that someone else accomplished her dream of stealing the throne, Scarlet confronts Bob, who voluntarily abdicates the throne in her favor. Undeterred, Scarlet imprisons Kevin, Stuart, and Bob in a dungeon, where a masked man named Blerb (Herb in disguise) attempts to torture the trio, but they escape with the intention of apologizing to Scarlet at her coronation.

After making their way to Westminster Abbey, Kevin, Stuart, and Bob interrupt the coronation by inadvertently dropping a chandelier on Scarlet. Mistaking the accident for an assassination attempt, a livid Scarlet orders the trio's execution and has other villains pursue them through the streets of London during a thunderstorm. Stuart and Bob are kidnapped, while Kevin hides in a pub and on television sees Scarlet, who declares that she will kill Stuart and Bob if Kevin does not show up by dawn. With the villains still searching for him, Kevin sneaks into Scarlet's castle to steal weapons and triggers a machine Herb was building, causing him to grow in size into a giant, and scaring the villains away. Kevin tramps through London, saves his friends and battles Scarlet, just as the other Minions turn up in the city. Scarlet tries to eradicate them by firing a massive missile, but Kevin eats the missile instead. Scarlet and Herb attempt to escape with her rocket dress, only for Kevin to hold onto it and get pulled into the sky. The missile explodes, seemingly killing Kevin, Scarlet and Herb. As the Minions mourn the loss of their friend, Kevin survives after returning to his normal size.

The Queen gets her throne and crown back. She rewards Bob with a tiny crown for his teddy bear Tim, Stuart with an electric guitar (which he accidentally destroys while rocking out, reluctantly choosing a snow globe, which was a gift from Kevin), and Kevin with a knighthood. Scarlet and Herb, still alive, steal the crown again, only to be stopped by a young boy named Gru, who fires a freeze ray at them and flees with the crown on a rocket-powered motorcycle. The Minions run after him, deciding he is the boss they were looking for.

== Voice cast ==
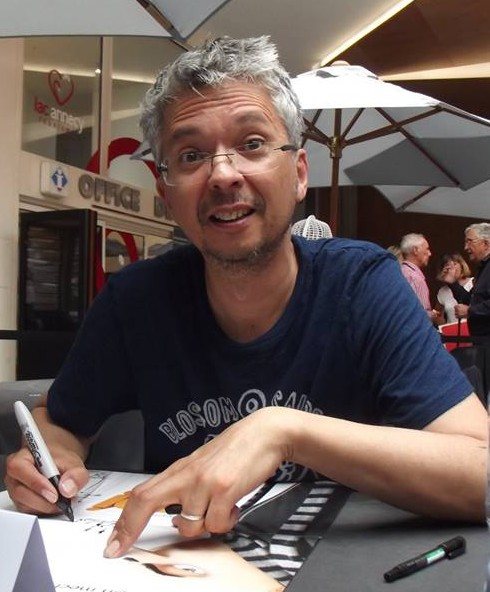
Director Pierre Coffin also voices the Minions.

- Pierre Coffin as the yellow, small Minions, including:
  - Kevin, a tall, two-eyed minion who is the leader of the Minion trio, out to find a new boss
  - Stuart, an average height, one-eyed minion who is a musician, and the slacker of the Minion trio
  - Bob, a short, two-eyed and heterochromic minion who is the youngest and smallest of the Minion trio
- Sandra Bullock as Scarlet Overkill, supervillain and Herb's wife
- Jon Hamm as Herb Overkill, a genius inventor and Scarlet's husband
- Michael Keaton as Walter Nelson, Madge's thief husband and Tina, Walter Jr. and Binky's father
- Allison Janney as Madge Nelson, Walter's thief wife and Tina, Walter Jr. and Binky's mother
- Steve Coogan as the Tower Guard
  - Coogan also voices Professor Flux, a scientist who develops time travel
- Jennifer Saunders as Elizabeth II, the Queen of the United Kingdom
- Geoffrey Rush narrates the prologue and epilogue

Additionally, Steve Carell reprises his role as Gru, who appears at the end of the film in his younger form. Other cast members include Katy Mixon as Tina Nelson, Walter and Madge's thief daughter; Michael Beattie as Walter Nelson Jr., Walter and Madge's thief son (Beattie also voices a VNC announcer); Tara Strong as Binky Nelson, the baby brother of Tina and Walter Jr.; Hiroyuki Sanada as Dumo, a sumo fighter villain; and Dave Rosenbaum as Fabrice, Scarlet's personal stylist.

== Production ==
=== Development ===
Development on Minions was greenlit in July 2012, after writer Brian Lynch recognized the popularity of Despicable Me Minion Mayhem, a simulator ride. Pierre Coffin became director again with newcomer Kyle Balda as the co-director, marking the first film in the franchise where Chris Renaud is not a director, but as an executive producer. Eric Guillon returned for the film but was not an art director, as he was the character and production designer for the film.

=== Casting ===
In February 2013, Sandra Bullock joined the cast to voice Scarlet Overkill, with Jon Hamm joining two months later as her husband Herb Overkill. Bullock was paid $10 million for her involvement. In March 2015, Allison Janney was cast as Madge Nelson. Pierre Coffin, the film's director, reprised his role as the Minions. This is one of the films in the franchise in which Coffin is the lead actor. Kyle Balda served as a co-director along with Coffin. Jennifer Saunders was cast to voice Queen Elizabeth II.

== Music ==
The official soundtrack for the film was released on July 10, 2015, by Back Lot Music. The soundtrack also features the film's original music, composed by Heitor Pereira.

== Marketing ==
Bloomberg News estimated that Universal Pictures spent $593 million promoting Minions, including $26.1 million on television advertisements; it described the promotion as the "largest and most comprehensive" in the distributor's history. It also featured 850 toy brands, as well as partners included McDonald's, Chiquita, and General Mills. In April 2015, Pantone announced the creation of a new official Pantone color, "Minion Yellow", in partnership with Illumination. Titan Comics published a series of comics and graphic novels based on the film in June. As a promotional tie-in, Minions Paradise was released.

== Release ==
=== Theatrical ===
Minions debuted at the Odeon Leicester Square in London on June 11, 2015, followed by a premiere on June 27, at the Shrine Auditorium in Los Angeles. The film was initially scheduled for release on December 19, 2014, but on September 20, 2013, it was postponed to July 10, 2015. This shift was reportedly made in response to Universal's satisfaction with the successful release of Despicable Me 2 (2013) and desire to exploit fully the merchandising potential of Minions.

=== Home media ===
Universal Pictures Home Entertainment released Minions for digital download on November 24, 2015, and on Blu-ray and DVD on December 8. Physical copies contain behind-the-scenes featurettes; a deleted scene; an interactive world map; short films Cro Minion, Competition, and Binky Nelson Unpacified; and a trailer of The Secret Life of Pets (2016). Minions was the best-selling home-video release of December. Blu-ray accounted for 67 percent of its sales, along with the home-media release of Ant-Man. By the end of 2015, the physical release had grossed about $95.7 million. A 4K Ultra HD Blu-ray version was released on September 5, 2017.

== Reception ==
=== Box office ===
Minions grossed $336 million in the United States and Canada and $823.4 million in other territories, for a worldwide total of $1.159 billion. It was the fifth-highest-grossing film of 2015 and the second-highest-grossing animated film of all time. On August 28, 2015, Minions passed the $1 billion mark at the worldwide box office, becoming the third animated film to cross that milestone after Toy Story 3 (2010) and Frozen (2013). Deadline Hollywood calculated the film's net profit as $502 million, accounting for production budgets, marketing, talent participations, and other costs; box office grosses and home media revenues placed it second on their list of 2015's "Most Valuable Blockbusters".

In the United States and Canada, Minions was released with The Gallows and Self/less on July 10, 2015. It grossed $46 million on its first day, including $6.2 million from Thursday night previews. During its opening weekend, the film grossed $115.2 million across 4,301 theaters, making it the second-highest opening weekend for an animated film, behind Shrek the Third (2007). Moreover, it had the largest opening weekend for a prequel, breaking the previous record held by Star Wars: Episode III – Revenge of the Sith (2005). The film would hold the record for having the highest opening weekend for an Illumination film until 2023 when The Super Mario Bros. Movie took it. Its second weekend grosses dropped by 57 percent to $50.2 million, and followed by another $22 million the third weekend. Minions completed its theatrical run on December 17, 2015.

Worldwide, Minions debuted in 44 markets on June 18, 2015, and later a total of 66 countries by July 11. The film grossed $12.5 million in its opening weekend from four countries, and in its second, Minions made $37.6 million in 10 markets. Its top international markets were the United Kingdom ($73.1 million), China ($63.47 million), and Germany ($63.46 million).

=== Critical response ===
The film has an approval rating of 55% based on 223 professional reviews on the review aggregator website Rotten Tomatoes, with an average rating of 5.8/10. Its critical consensus reads, "The Minions' brightly colored brand of gibberish-fueled insanity stretches to feature length in their self-titled Despicable Me spinoff, with uneven but often hilarious results." Metacritic (which uses a weighted average) assigned the film a score of 56 out of 100 based on 35 critics, indicating "mixed or average" reviews. Audiences polled by CinemaScore gave the film an average grade of "A" on an A+ to F scale.

Jesse Hassenger of The A.V. Club gave the film a C, saying "Minions has idiosyncratic roots, but it's a franchise play all the way. Finally, even 5-year-olds have their own movie that mechanically cashes in on something they loved when they were younger". Michael O'Sullivan of The Washington Post gave the film two and a half stars out of four, saying, "I, too, once enjoyed the Minions, in the small doses that they came in. But the extra-strength Minions is, for better or for worse, too much of a good thing". Brian Truitt of USA Today gave the film two and a half stars out of four, saying, "Brian Lynch's screenplay features a series of amusing sight gags and physical comedy that mostly hits; watching the Minions play Polo while riding Corgis is an exercise in cuteness". Tom Russo of The Boston Globe gave the film two stars out of four, saying, "Impressive as it is that the filmmakers get so much comedic mileage out of their characters' half-intelligible prattling, the conventional dialogue is bafflingly flat". Manohla Dargis of The New York Times said, "While Minions explores nominally new narrative ground, it folds neatly into a series that now includes two features, various shorts, books, video games, sheet music and a theme park attraction. So, you know, different but also the same".

Tom Long of The Detroit News gave the film a B, saying "Minions is every bit as cute as it's supposed to be, a happily empty-headed animated frolic that rarely pauses to take a breath". Peter Travers of Rolling Stone gave the film two stars out of four, saying, "It's not whether this prequel can mint money; that's a given. The questions is: Can the minions carry a movie all by their mischievous mini-selves? 'Fraid not". Kerry Lengel of The Arizona Republic gave the film two-and-a-half stars out of five, saying, "Despite the dizzying pace of carefully calibrated incongruities, Minions somehow never generates more than the occasional chuckle". Christopher Orr of The Atlantic said, "There's plenty of high-velocity comic inanity on display to keep kids happily diverted. But the movie's major flaw is an extension of its own premise: Search as they may, the minions never find a villain worthy of their subservience". Liam Lacey of The Globe and Mail gave the film two stars out of four, saying, "With its episodic stream of slapstick gags, Minions has moments of piquant absurdity, but mostly its shrill-but-cutesy anarchy works as a visual sugar rush for the preschool set".

=== Accolades ===
Accolades received by Minions (film)
Award	Date of ceremony	Category	Recipient(s)	Result	Ref.
Annie Awards	February 6, 2016	Outstanding Achievement for Animated Effects in an Animated Production	Frank Baradat, Antonin Seydoux, Milo Riccarand, and Nicolas Brack	Nominated	
Annie Awards	February 6, 2016	Outstanding Achievement for Character Animation in a Feature Production	Hichem Arfaoui	Nominated	
Annie Awards	February 6, 2016	Outstanding Achievement for Character Design in a Feature Production	Eric Guillon	Nominated	
Annie Awards	February 6, 2016	Outstanding Achievement for Production Design in an Animated Feature Production	Eric Guillon	Nominated	
Annie Awards	February 6, 2016	Outstanding Achievement for Storyboarding in a Feature Production	Habib Louati	Nominated	
Annie Awards	February 6, 2016	Outstanding Achievement for Voice Acting in an Animated Feature Production	Pierre Coffin	Nominated	
Annie Awards	February 6, 2016	Outstanding Achievement for Voice Acting in an Animated Feature Production	Jon Hamm	Nominated	
British Academy Children's Awards	November 22, 2015	Kid's Vote — Film	Minions	Won	
British Academy Film Awards	February 14, 2016	Best Animated Film	Minions	Nominated	
Cinema Audio Society Awards	February 20, 2016	Outstanding Achievement in Sound Mixing for a Motion Picture – Animated	Carlos Sotolongo, Gary Rizzo, Chris Scarabosio, Shawn Murphy, and Corey Tyler	Nominated	
Empire Awards	March 20, 2016	Best Animated Film	Minions	Nominated	
Golden Reel Awards	February 27, 2016	Outstanding Achievement in Sound Editing – Sound Effects, Foley, Dialogue and ADR for Animated Feature Film	Dennis Leonard	Nominated	
Golden Trailer Awards	May 6, 2015	Best Animation/Family	"Trailer 1" (Motive Creative)	Nominated	
Golden Trailer Awards	May 6, 2015	Best Animation/Family Poster	"Stuart, Kevin & Bob One-Sheet" (Ignition)	Won	
Golden Trailer Awards	May 6, 2015	Best Summer Blockbuster Poster	"Stuart, Kevin & Bob One-Sheet" (Ignition)	Won	
Golden Trailer Awards	May 6, 2015	Best Summer Blockbuster Poster	"Overkill One-Sheet" (Ignition)	Nominated	
Golden Trailer Awards	May 4, 2016	Best Animation/Family Poster	"Butts" (Lindeman & Associates)	Nominated	
Golden Trailer Awards	May 4, 2016	Best Animation/Family TV Spot	"Came From" (Workshop Creative)	Nominated	
Golden Trailer Awards	May 4, 2016	Best Billboard	"Bananas Billboard" (Lindeman & Associates)	Nominated	
Golden Trailer Awards	May 4, 2016	Best Voiceover TV Spot	"Came From" (Workshop Creative)	Nominated	
Golden Trailer Awards	May 4, 2016	Best Wildposts (Teaser Campaign)	"Artist Series" (Lindeman & Associates)	Won	
Hollywood Music in Media Awards	November 11, 2015	Best Original Score in an Animated Film	Heitor Pereira	Nominated	
Kansas City Film Critics Circle Awards	December 20, 2015	Best Animated Feature	Minions	Nominated	
Nickelodeon Kids' Choice Awards	March 12, 2016	Favorite Animated Movie	Minions	Nominated	
Nickelodeon Kids' Choice Awards	March 12, 2016	Favorite Voice From an Animated Movie	Sandra Bullock	Nominated	
People's Choice Awards	January 6, 2016	Favorite Animated Movie Voice	Sandra Bullock	Nominated	
People's Choice Awards	January 6, 2016	Favorite Family Movie	Minions	Won	
Producers Guild of America Awards	January 23, 2016	Best Animated Motion Picture	Chris Meledandri and Janet Healy	Nominated	
Saturn Awards	June 22, 2016	Best Animated Film	Minions	Nominated	

== Legacy ==
In the years following its release, Minions has remained an enduringly popular film of the Despicable Me franchise. It is popular globally, inspiring Internet memes. The film's headlining trio appeared at the 88th Academy Awards in 2016, in which they presented Best Animated Short Film. During his presentation for Best Picture, English comedian Sacha Baron Cohen called the characters "hard-working little yellow people with tiny dongs" in response to the lack of diversity. Coffin stated in 2024 that Minions's box-office take made successful through marketing rather than quality, but he expressed displeasure over the final film. That August, Renaud felt that Minions should not be remade into its live-action adaptation, which was considered to have a different take and could diminish the characters' popularity.

== Sequel and prequel ==
Minions's success spawned the Minions film series, beginning with its sequel Minions: The Rise of Gru (2022). In the film, an eleven-year-old Gru plans to become a supervillain with the help of his Minions, which leads to a showdown with a malevolent team, the Vicious 6. It achieved similar financial and critical success as the first two Despicable Me films. A third film, Minions & Monsters, was released in July 2026.
