= Captain Paragon =

Paragon

Publication information
- Publisher: AC Comics
- First appearance: Captain Paragon vol. 1, #1 (1972)
- Created by: Bill Black

In-story information
- Alter ego: Charlie Starrett
- Team affiliations: Sentinels of Justice
- Notable aliases: Captain Paragon, the Latigo Kid
- Abilities: Superhuman strength, speed and stamina Limited invulnerability Flight; Enhanced longevity

Paragon, or Captain Paragon, is a fictional superhero character published by AC Comics currently as a supporting character in Femforce. This character initially had his own book, then was with the Sentinels of Justice.

== Character biography ==
Charlie Starrett was a 19th-century ranch hand who was secretly the heroic masked gunslinger known as the Latigo Kid, he starred alongside classic Western characters such as Black Phantom, Red Mask and the Durango Kid. In the early 20th century, a secret organization called the Paragon Foundation enhanced Starrett's latent psionic abilities and transformed him into the super-powered, blue and red-costumed Captain Paragon.

He fought the forces of evil until the 1950s when he was apparently killed by his archenemy, the Black Shroud. His body, however, was stolen by the evil Proxima and her alien warrior women and taken to the planet Rur, where he was revived even more powerful than he was before so he could be used as a weapon against their enemies, the Krotons. Escaping with the aid of the stellar-powered scientist Stardust, he returned to Earth only to find that thirty years had passed and that, stricken with amnesia, he no longer had any memory of who he was behind his mask.

Hiring a private detective to dig into his past, he turned his attention to the more important matters at hand and helped found the Sentinels of Justice with Stardust, Nightveil, Commando D and the Scarlet Scorpion in Captain Paragon and Sentinels of Justice #1 to battle super-villains and alien invasions. Later, the Sentinels were disbanded by the military and were replaced with other heroes which did not sit well with the original members. With Jennifer Burke chosen to lead the New Sentinels of Justice under the name of Paragon, the original Paragon objected. This led the original Sentinels members to be named advisers to the new team.

Captain Paragon is married to Femforce leader Miss Victory. He is a frequent ally of the team.

== Inspiration ==
Bill Black first attempted to revive the original Captain Marvel written and drawn in a more realistic Marvel Comics style in his 1969 fanzine Paragon Golden Age Greats, Vol. 1, #2. However, on the legal advice of his friend and publishing mentor, Martin L. Greim, he decided that rather than risk copyright trouble with Fawcett Publications it was best to destroy the entire print run, except for two copies he saved for his files. He then redid the story using his own newly created hero, Captain Paragon.

The name of Paragon's original secret identity is a tribute to cowboy star Charles Starrett who played the Durango Kid.
