= Murmur (comics) =

Murmur, in comics, may refer to:

- Murmur (DC Comics), a DC Comics supervillain
- Murmur (Marvel Comics), a Marvel Comics superhero

== See also ==
- Murmur (disambiguation)
