= The Green Lama (radio series) =

American radio adventure drama (1949)

The Green Lama is an American radio adventure drama that was broadcast on CBS June 5, 1949 - August 20, 1949. It was based on novels about that character by Richard Foster.

== Overview ==
After spending 10 years in Tibet in a monastery of lamas, wealthy young Jethro Dumont returned to the United States after having become an honorary lama. In addition to that title, he had obtained "curious and secret powers" that he used, as the on-air introduction said, "in his single-handed fight against injustice and crime". In Tibet, green represented justice, so he chose that color as part of his name.

Paul Frees portrayed Dumont, and Ben Wright played his loyal Tibetan servant, Tulku. Other actors and actresses heard on the series included Harry Bartell, Gloria Blondell, Lillian Buyeff, William Conrad, Lawrence Dobkin, Georgia Ellis, Laurette Fillbrandt, Jack Kruschen, Nestor Paiva, and Herb Vigran. Larry Thor was the announcer. Richard Aurandt provided the music.

== Production ==
Initially Norman MacDonnell produced and directed the show; By July 6, 1949, Jim Burton had become the director. Writers included Foster, William Froug, and Ken Crossen. Originating from Hollywood, the show was sustaining. It initially was broadcast on Sundays at 5:30 p.m. Eastern Time as a replacement for Broadway Is My Beat. Effective July 16, 1949, it was moved to Saturdays at 7 p.m. E. T.

== Episodes ==
Episodes of The Green Lama
Date	Episode
June 5, 1949	"The Man Who Never Existed"
June 12, 1949	"The Man Who Stole a Pyramid"
June 19, 1949	"The Girl With No Name"
June 26, 1949	"The Million Dollar Chopsticks"
July 3, 1949	"The Last Dinosaur"
July 16, 1949	"The Return of Madame Pompadour"
July 23, 1949	"Tapestry in Purple"
July 30, 1949	"The African Diamond Affair"
August 6, 1949	"The Gumbo Man"
August 13, 1949	"The Case of the Dangerous Dog"
August 20, 1949	"The Case of the Patient Prisoner"

== Critical response ==
A review of the premiere episode in the trade publication Variety said that it was "a little fanciful" but adequate for a summer mystery program. The review commended the acting of Frees and the supporting cast as well as the quality of the show's writing and the episode's "exotic atmosphere".
