= Yankee Girl =

- Yankee Girl (AC Comics version)

Publication information
- Publisher: Dynamic Publications; Superior Publishers; AC Comics
- First appearance: As Kitty Kelly: Punch Comics #1; As Lauren Mason: Dynamic Comics #23 (Nov. 1947)
- Created by: Lauren Mason: Ralph Mayo (artist)

In-story information
- Full name: Kitty Kelly; Lauren MasonLauren Mason
- Species: Human
- Team affiliations: Sentinels of Justice
- Abilities: Superhuman strength Invulnerability; Flight

Yankee Girl is the name of two superheroines each debuting during the 1930s and 1940s Golden Age of Comic Books. One was revived in the 1990s.

== Publication history ==
The first superheroine called Yankee Girl was Kitty Kelly, debuting in Dynamic Publications's Punch Comics #1 (cover-dated December 1941).

The next Yankee Girl, Lauren Mason, appeared solely in Dynamic Comics #23 (Nov. 1947) by artist Ralph Mayo, from the Canadian firm Superior Publishers. This story and another, whose original publication is unknown, appear in unauthorized reprints from I.W. Publishing / Super Comics in 1958 and 1964.

An updated version of Lauren Mason re-appeared in AC Comics' FemForce #29 (1990), as one of dozens of characters in a 24-page story by writer Bill Black and penciler Rik Levins. She went on to the single-issue Yankee Girl (Oct. 2003). through 2008.

== Fictional character biography ==
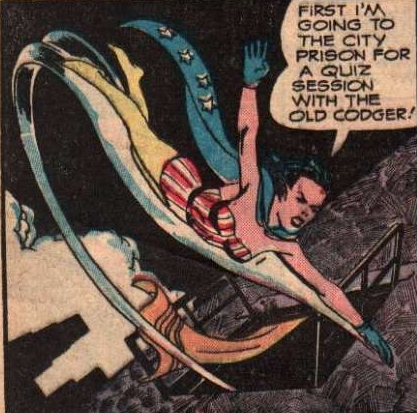
Yankee Girl (Lauren Mason) from Dynamic Comics #23 (Nov. 1947). Art by Ralph Mayo

In the 1940s, young socialite Lauren Mason would utter the words "Yankee Doodle Dandy!" to transform into Yankee Girl, gaining super strength, the power of flight, and enhanced durability or possibly invulnerability. In her only Golden Age appearance, Yankee Girl catches two murderers who are killing people with poisoned cats.

In present-day stories beginning in the 1990s, it was explained that Mason had been bestowed her powers by the wizard Merlin in order to produce a champion to aid the Allied Forces during World War II. She and several other heroes of that era volunteered to enter suspended animated sleep at a classified vault to be summoned again when the world needed them. During the "Shroud Wars" storyline of Femforce, these heroes were awakened and were initially referred to as the "Vault Champions".

Yankee Girl is still essentially a young woman who grew up in the 1930s and 1940s, and is depicted as being relatively naive regarding the modern world and how society has changed. In various Femforce issues, Yankee Girl served as a spokesmodel for "Dunkies", a popular snack cake, along with Span-X, a fabric tailored for superheroes, with humorous results.

== Powers and abilities ==
By uttering the words "Yankee Doodle Dandy!", the 1940s Lauren Mason gained super strength, the power of flight, and enhanced durability or possibly invulnerability.

In the 1990s, her magic words are Karma Madre Tolon. This instantly changes her clothing into her heroic costume and gives her super powers. In this form she can lift 9000 pounds, is almost impervious to harm, and can fly. She can also survive in outer space unprotected.
