= Rad (character) =

- Miss Victory as Rad

Publication information
- Publisher: AC Comics

In-story information
- Alter ego: Jennifer Burke
- Team affiliations: Femforce; Sentinels of Justice
- Notable aliases: Miss Victory, Paragon
- Abilities: Superhuman strength Limited invulnerability

Rad is a comic book supervillain in the Femforce comic published by AC Comics.

Rad possesses superhuman strength, together with the ability to fly (although only over short distances). Her true identity was Jennifer Burke, daughter of the original Miss Victory, who in the 1940s developed the "V-formula" to increase the strength/stamina of allied troops. The initial formula, V-45, turned Dan Barton, crack covert agent and boyfriend of Laura Wright, into the supervillain Black Commando. Joan Wayne was able to alter the formula, creating V-47, which only worked on herself and only for a short period of time, and she became the superheroine "Miss Victory".

In the 1980s, the Black Commando force-fed some of the V-45 to Joan. In addition to permanent super strength and youth, she developed the same paranoia and narcissism that the Black Commando had. She took the name "Rad" and became a ruthless mercenary. Eventually, Femforce was able to expunge the V-45 from her system and restore Joan's normal personality.

In the meantime, Joan Wayne was replaced by her grown-up daughter Jennifer Burke (the only other person on whom the V-47 would work) becoming the second Miss Victory. After the return of Joan Wayne to the Miss Victory codename, Jennifer Burke left Femforce and was chosen to lead the New Sentinels of Justice under the name of Paragon which was objected to by the original Paragon. The combined stress of replacing her mother in Femforce, her son being killed by a villain, losing her husband in an affair with a team member, and then being replaced by her mother left Jennifer vulnerable to the machinations of the Shroud. Once again, she followed in her mother's footsteps, taking the V-45 and becoming the new Rad.
