= Add a Line =

1949 American radio game show

- Genre: Game show
- Running time: 30 minutes
- Country of origin: United States
- Language: English
- Syndicates: ABC
- Hosted by: John Nelson
- Original release: July 4 – September 26, 1949

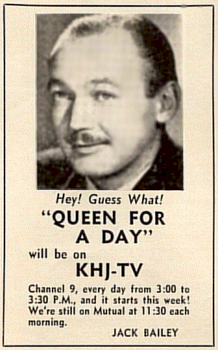

Add a Line is a daytime radio game show which aired coast-to-coast on ABC from July 4, 1949, to September 26, 1949. The title came from the show's format, which "called for players to add the final line to a rhyme given to them by the host."

== Gameplay ==
Players called in live from anywhere in the United States. First, John Nelson supplied a line, and the player attempted to come up with any rhyming line within ten seconds. If successful, the player progressed to the second task: John Nelson recited a couplet from a popular work of writing without the last word and the player attempted to fill in the blank. For example, if he said "I think that I shall never see / A poem as lovely as a...", the player might correctly answer "tree" by recognizing the poem Trees or by guessing with context clues. The player would then win the $1000 prize that was given out once per day.

The 30-minute program was typically broadcast at 2:30 p.m. and was hosted by John Nelson (1915–76), who had previously emceed a daily radio show called Bride and Groom in which he interviewed couples before and after their weddings, and had also appeared on audience participation radio shows such as Breakfast at Sardi's. Add a Line emerged amid a wave of call-in shows that relied on telephones and its prize offerings, which included the $1000 daily jackpot as well as varying household items such as a television set, did not generate as much publicity as the large prizes offered by competing shows. In September 1949, after one season, hosting duties transferred to Jack McCoy, a Hollywood radio personality known for shows such as Kay Kyser's College of Musical Knowledge and Let's Meet McCoy, while John Nelson focused on Bride and Groom and the new ABC television show Auction-Aires.

In Radio and Television (Appleton-Century-Crofts, 1950), Garnet R. Garrison and Giraud Chester noted:

"By 1949, the give-away programs had taken on the character of a bonanza. One CBS program offered a jackpot of $50,000 to the lucky winner. NBC launched a mammoth quiz called Hollywood Calling to compete with the Jack Benny show. ABC had Stop the Music, Strike It Rich and Add a Line. Mutual, with its Queen for a Day, managed to give away more prizes than any of the other networks."
