= Green Lama =

Fictional pulp magazine hero

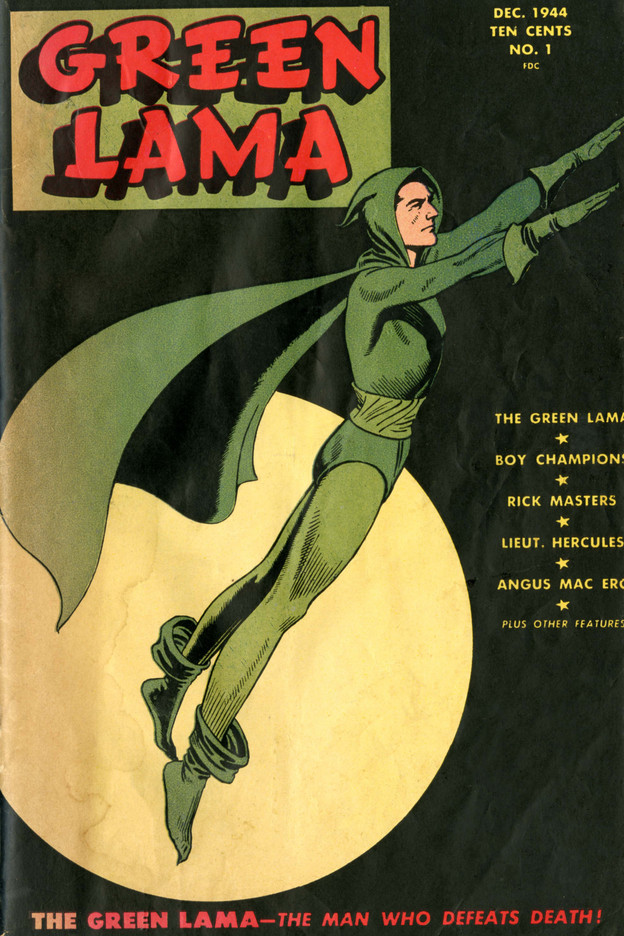

Publication information
- Publisher: Frank A. Munsey; Prize Comics; Spark Publications; Moonstone Books
- First appearance: Double Detective vol. 5, #5 (April 1940)
- Created by: Kendell Foster Crossen

In-story information
- Alter ego: Jethro Dumont
- Notable aliases: Dr. Charles Pali, Hugh Gilmore
- Abilities: Flight; Super speed and strength Ability to emit energy beams Control fire Animal manipulation

The Green Lama is a fictional pulp magazine hero of the 1940s, created by American author Kendell Foster Crossen. He is commonly portrayed as a powerful Buddhist Lama, dressing in green robes with a red scarf and using his powerful skill set to fight crime. Slightly different versions of the same character also appeared in comic books and on the radio. Unlike many contemporaneous characters from smaller publishers, the Green Lama character is not in the public domain, as the author "wisely retained all rights to his creation".

== Pulps ==
=== Original pulps ===

The Green Lama first appeared in a short novel entitled The Green Lama in the April 1940 issue of Double Detective magazine. The novel was written by Kendell Foster Crossen using the pseudonym of "Richard Foster". Writing in 1976, Crossen recalled that the character was created because the publishers of Double Detective, the Frank Munsey company, wanted a competitor for The Shadow, which was published by their rivals Street & Smith.

The character, partially inspired by explorer Theos "the White Lama" Bernard, was originally conceived as "The Gray Lama", but tests of the cover art proved to be unsatisfactory, so the color was changed to green. The Green Lama proved to be successful (though not as successful as The Shadow), and Crossen continued to produce Green Lama stories for Double Detective regularly up until March 1943, for a total of 14 stories.

Although appearing in a detective fiction magazine, the Green Lama tales can be considered science fiction or supernatural fantasy in that the Green Lama and other characters are possessed of superhuman powers and super-science weapons. The Green Lama is an alias of Jethro Dumont, a rich resident of New York City, born July 25, 1913, to millionaires John Pierre Dumont and Janet Lansing. He received his A.B. from Harvard University, M.A. from Oxford, and Ph.D. from the Sorbonne; he also attended Drepung College in Tibet. He inherited his father’s fortune, estimated at ten million dollars, when his parents were both killed in an accident while he was still at Harvard; he then spent ten years in Tibet studying to be a lama (a Buddhist Spiritual Teacher), acquiring many mystical powers in the process. He returned to America intending to spread the doctrines of Tibetan Buddhism (to relieve suffering by removing ignorance), but realized that he could accomplish more by fighting crime, since Americans were not ready to receive spiritual teachings. He never carried a gun, believing that "this would make me no better than those I fight". Dumont was also endowed with superhuman powers acquired through his scientific knowledge of radioactive salts. Dumont had two main alter egos: the crime-fighting Green Lama and the Buddhist priest Dr. Pali. Additional alter egos included the adventurer "Hugh Gilmore".

Among the Green Lama's associates were a Tibetan lama named Tsarong, the college-educated reformed gangster Gary Brown, the post-debutante Evangl Stewart (who would go on to marry Gary), radiologist Dr. Harrison Valco, New York City police detective John Caraway, actor Ken Clayton, Montana-born actress Jean Farrell, and magician Theodor Harrin. The Green Lama was also frequently assisted by a mysterious woman known as "Magga", whose true identity was never revealed. Crossen's pseudonym "Richard Foster" was also established as a character and friend of Jethro Dumont.

The first six stories have been reprinted in the pulp reprint fanzine High Adventure. Altus Press has reprinted the entire series in three volumes.

==== Official continuity of Green Lama pulp stories ====
1923–1933

- "The Case of the Final Column" by Adam Lance Garcia (flashbacks)
- "The Green Lama: Unbound" by Adam Lance Garcia (flashbacks)
- "Black Bat / The Green Lama: Homecoming" by Adam Lance Garcia
- "Shiva Endangered" by Kevin Noel Olson
- "Eye of the Beholder" by Adam Lance Garcia

1935

- "Case of the Crimson Hand" by Kendell Foster Crossen
- "Croesus of Murder" by Kendell Foster Crossen

1936

- "Babies for Sale" by Kendell Foster Crossen
- "Wave of Death" by Kendell Foster Crossen

1937

- "The Man Who Wasn’t There" by Kendell Foster Crossen
- "Death’s Head Face" by Kendell Foster Crossen

1938

- "The Green Lama: Horror in Clay" by Adam Lance Garcia
- "The Case of the Clown Who Laughed" by Kendell Foster Crossen
- "The Case of the Invisible Enemy" by Kendell Foster Crossen
- "The Case of the Mad Magi" by Kendell Foster Crossen
- "The Case of the Vanishing Ships" by Kendell Foster Crossen
- "The Case of the Fugitive Fingerprints" by Kendell Foster Crossen
- "The Green Lama: Scions" by Adam Lance Garcia
- "The Case of the Crooked Cane" by Kendell Foster Crossen
- "The Case of the Hollywood Ghost" by Kendell Foster Crossen

1939

- "The Case of the Beardless Corpse" by Kendell Foster Crossen
- "The Case of the Final Column" by Adam Lance Garcia (Altus Press)
- "The Green Lama: Unbound" by Adam Lance Garcia
- "The Green Lama: Dæmon’s Kiss" by Adam Lance Garcia
- "The Green Lama: Crimson Circle" by Adam Lance Garcia

=== Modern pulps ===

In 2009, Airship 27 Productions and publisher Cornerstone Book Publishers began releasing a series of new pulp anthologies and novels. These new stories treat the original pulps as a vague history, though they slightly shift the time period from the early 1940s to the late 1930s and portray the Lama as younger and less experienced.

While the books were produced without the Crossen Estate, neither the authors nor the publisher were aware of the estate's claim at the time. The book was produced in good faith under the belief that the character was in the Public Domain, with no intention to infringe on any unknown rights. One of the stories, set in 1939, sought to portray the origin of the Green Lama. The other stories, while perhaps preceding the pulps in narrative order, would likely be set in the 1940s, possibly preceding the first publication in April 1940.

==== Volume 1 ====
The first new Green Lama anthology was released on August 14, 2009. The anthology, edited by Ron Fortier, featured three new stories—two short stories, and one novella—written by Kevin Noel Olson, W. Peter Miller, and Adam L. Garcia, respectively. Olson's story, "Shiva Endangered", tells one of the Lama's first adventures in Tibet and introduces the McGuffin known as the Jade Tablet (a copy of the legendary Emerald Tablet) and explains the origins of the Lama's powers. Garcia's novella, "Horror in Clay", is set years later in New York, shortly after Crossen's story "Death's Head Face", and pits the Lama and friends against a golem, as well as continuing the narrative of the Jade Tablet and tying the Green Lama into the Cthulhu mythos. Finally, Miller's short, "The Studio Specter", is set in L.A., soon after the events of "Horror in Clay", and tells the story of a Phantom-like villain terrorizing a film studio.

"Horror in Clay", the cover art by Mike Fyles, and Jay Piscopo's interior artwork from this volume were nominated for 2009 Pulp Factory Awards.

==== Volume 2: Green Lama: Unbound ====
The Green Lama's first full-length novel in nearly 70 years, Green Lama: Unbound, was released July 28, 2010. Written by Adam L. Garcia, it displayed interior and cover art by Mike Fyles. The novel takes place roughly six months after "Studio Specter" and shortly after the last original pulp story, "Beardless Corpse". Continuing the Jade Tablet storyline established in "Shiva Enangered" and "Horror in Clay", Unbound pitted the Green Lama against Lovecraft's Great Old Ones and Cthulhu, as well as featured—for the first time ever—details of Dumont's ten years in Tibet.

In 2011, the book, Garcia, and Fyles were nominated for several awards including Best Novel, Best Interior Art, and Best Exterior Art in the Pulp Factory Awards; as well as Best Book, Best Cover Art, Best Interior, Best Pulp Revival, and Best Author in the 2011 Pulp Ark Awards. It won for Best Pulp Revival in the Pulp Ark Awards, and Best Pulp Novel and Best Interior Art in the Pulp Factory Awards.

=== Airship 27 ===
==== Green Lama: Mystic Warrior ====
Airship 27 released Green Lama-Mystic Warrior in 2013, with two original stories from Volume One and two new stories. A second edition came out in 2014. The stories and authors in this volume are "Shiva Endangered" by Kevin Noel Olson, "The Menace of the Black Ring" by Nick Ahlhelm, "The Studio Specter" by W Peter Miller, and "The Case of the Hairless Ones" by Robert Craig, with cover art by Isaac L. Nacilla and interior illustrations by Neil Foster.

=== Moonstone Publishers ===
When it was established that the Green Lama was not in the public domain, Garcia moved his books to Moonstone. Along with new work, Garcia's stories "Horror in Clay" and "Unbound" were authorized to be reissued in expanded releases. Garcia has also produced short stories crossing over the Green Lama with other pulp heroes.

==== Green Lama: Scions ====
Taking place shortly after "Horror in Clay", Dumont and his associates fight a malevolent force that arrived in New York aboard a cruise ship filled with people murdered at their own hands.

==== Green Lama: Daemon's Kiss ====
A short story featured in Moonstone's "Of Monsters and Men" anthology, the Green Lama and his associates fight a succubus outside a rural hotel. Features original "widescreen" art by Mike Fyles.

==== Green Lama: Crimson Circle ====
A second novel, Green Lama: Crimson Circle, also by Garcia and Fyles, came out in 2015. The story is a sequel to the very first Green Lama pulp story, "Case of the Crimson Hand", while continuing the plot threads left hanging at the end of Unbound. The short comic "Green Lama and the Death Dealers" by Garcia and Fyles, bridges the gap between Unbound and Crimson Circle. A third novel is also written named Green Lama: Redemption.

=== Altus Press ===
In addition to reprinting the original pulp stories in 2011 and 2012, Altus Press included a new short story in their third volume, "Green Lama and the Case of the Final Column", by Garcia and Fyles that ties the original pulps and new pulps stories together. "The Final Column" is set immediately after "The Case of the Beardless Corpse", shortly before the events of Green Lama: Unbound, and lays the groundwork for several plot points in Unbound and the Crimson Circle. It also features Crossen's pseudonym "Richard Foster" as a principal character.

== Comic books ==
=== Golden Age comics ===
==== Prize Comics ====
The Green Lama's first comic book appearance was in issue #7 of Crestwood Publications' Prize Comics (December 1940). The character continued to appear in the title for 27 issues (through 1943). All stories were written by Ken Crossen, with art by Mac Raboy and others. In Prize Comics #24, he teamed up with Black Owl, Dr. Frost, and Yank and Doodle to take down Frankenstein's Monster.

This version of the character bears considerable similarities to his pulp counterpart, most notably his costume design, but was more of a sorcerer with the ability to travel through time, resurrect the dead and often battled Lucifer's minions. There were also minor changes to his supporting cast such as Jean "Parker" and the inclusion of a character known as Tashi Shog (a Tibetan liturgic wish meaning "May prosperity be").

According to Jess Nevins' Encyclopedia of Golden Age Superheroes, the Green Lama "fights Yellow Peril racketeers, the Nazi femme fatale Baroness von Elsa, the ghostly Pharod, snake cultists, the Nazi agent Harlequin, and especially the occultist Professor Voodoo, 'two legged beast of prey' who surpasses 'in cunning and cruelty all the forces of evil'".

==== Spark Publications ====
He then moved to his own title, The Green Lama (Spark Publications), published by Kendell Foster Crossen, which lasted for eight issues from December 1944 to March 1946. This iteration character of the Green Lama was somewhat different from his previous versions, taking a page from the original Captain Marvel and transforming via a magic word ("Om! Mani Padme Hum!") into a cape and skintight costume-clad superhero with superhuman strength and the power of flight (his adventures were even drawn by ace Captain Marvel Jr. artist Mac Raboy). However the scripts were still written by Kendell Foster Crossen, who had created the earlier pulp version of the character.

Reprints of the Green Lama stories from the eight-issue Spark series are available in two hardcover archive volumes produced by Dark Horse Comics in 2008.

=== Modern comics ===
==== AC Comics ====
Over the last 20 years, the publisher AC Comics has been virtually the only source for the original Golden Age material featuring the Green Lama, and intermittently used the character in their long-running, original series Femforce. In 2004, writer/artist James Ritchey III started production on a two-part graphic novella, entitled Green Lama: Man of Strength, revamping the version from the Spark Publications era. Billing the story in interviews as a "Superhero Mystical Murder Mystery involving Reincarnation", Ritchey never completed the art for part two, due to illness—so it was shelved for three years.

Green Lama: Man of Strength #1 shipped through Diamond Distributors on April 5, 2008, after a requested a one-month delay from Diamond, due to their frowning upon smaller independents having two similar titles shipped simultaneously. The second issue came out in 2009.

==== Dynamite Comics ====
The Green Lama is currently one of several Golden Age characters appearing in the Dynamite Entertainment comic book series Project Superpowers, by writer Jim Krueger and artist Alex Ross. This version of the Green Lama is vaguely a continuation of his Spark Publications iteration, though his powers have evolved to be more nature-based. The character has been used without authorization of the Crossen Estate.

==== Moonstone ====
Moonstone Publishers are new publishers of back-up comic stories based on the pulp version of the character under its "Return of the Originals" banner. These shorts are written by Mike W. Barr. Moonstone has released in 2013 a new novel of the character, The Green Lama: Scions, written by Adam Lance Garcia.

== In other media ==
=== Web comics and fiction ===
Green Lama is one of several Golden Age comic characters to make an appearance in Tales of the Living Legends, a webcomic featuring Golden Age art and rewritten stories.

The Green Lama plays a key role as a supporting character in the fiction blog, Flyover City.

=== Radio ===
More than three years after the demise of his comic book, the Green Lama was resurrected for a short-lived CBS radio series that ran for 11 episodes from June 5 to August 20, 1949, with the character's voice provided by Paul Frees. This version of the Green Lama was also written by creator Kendell Foster Crossen, along with several co-writers.

=== Television ===
CBS Television considered producing a television version of the Green Lama for the 1950 season. The proposal never got the green light.

=== Aerial performance ===
On January 6, 2012, the Green Lama came to life in an aerial performance at the Rubin Museum of Art as part of its "Hero, Villain, Yeti" exhibit. It was written by Adam Lance Garcia, based on his short story "Case of the Final Column", and performed by New-York-based Cirquetacular.

== Buddhist element ==
The Green Lama stories display a sympathetic and relatively knowledgeable portrayal of Buddhism, both in the text of the stories and in numerous footnotes. From Crossen's own comments, in his foreword to Robert Weinberg's 1976 reprint of the first Green Lama story, it is clear that this was not proselytism on his part, but simply because he wanted to create a Tibetan Buddhist character and then read everything he could find on the subject.

The most frequent reference to Buddhism in the stories is the use of the Sanskrit mantra "Om mani padme hum" (usually translated as "Om, the jewel on the lotus"), which would indeed be used by Tibetan monks. However, the majority of other references to Buddhism in the stories, while accurate, relate to the Theravada form of Buddhism rather than the Tibetan form, with frequent use of Pali words such as "Magga", "Nibbana", and "Dhamma", rather than the Sanskrit equivalents that would be used in Tibetan Buddhism.

== See also ==
- Peter Cannon, Thunderbolt – a similar concept also from the mid-20th century
