= Dabung Girl =

Indian Comic Book Superhero

Publication information
- Publisher: Deeper learning Innovations Private Limited
- First appearance: "Dabung Girl and the Space Journey" (2019)
- Created by: Saurabh Agarwal

In-story information
- Alter ego: Tara
- Species: Human mutate
- Place of origin: Tadkapur
- Abilities: Intelligence; Superhuman Stretchability, Elasticity/Plasticity, Malleability, Resilience, Durability and Agility

Dabung Girl (Hindi: दबंग गर्ल) is a fictional, Indian comic book superhero character. Dabung Girl is an Indian adolescent girl superhero focusing on breaking gender stereotypes. She was created by life skills educationist Saurabh Agarwal. Dabung Girl’s stories are presented as a comic book series. The word Dabung means ‘fearless’ in English.

== Key characters ==
- Tara/Dabung Girl: Dabung Girl aka Tara is a regular village girl. Tara transforms herself into Dabung Girl by saying Kavooom!!!
- SuperAvni (aka Maya): Tara’s elder sister.
- Purple Flame (aka Riya): Dabung Girl’s friend, who is also a superhero and has dyslexia.

== Awards and recognition ==
Year	Title
2021	Winner of Social Media for Empowerment Award (SM4E) for child protection community campaign
2021	Winner of best emerging comic book series for children at CBAM Awards by AnimationXpress
2020	Social Impact Design Award at Design Leadership Summit by IAMAI
2020	Gather Fellowship for Social Impact, Seeds of Peace
2020	Nomination for Best Children Illustrated Book of the Year, ComicCon
2020	Dabung Girl supported a design challenge, to solve social problem, in 2020 in partnership with Internet and Mobile Association of India (IAMAI) and UNICEF
