= Kendell Foster Crossen =

American writer (1910–1981)

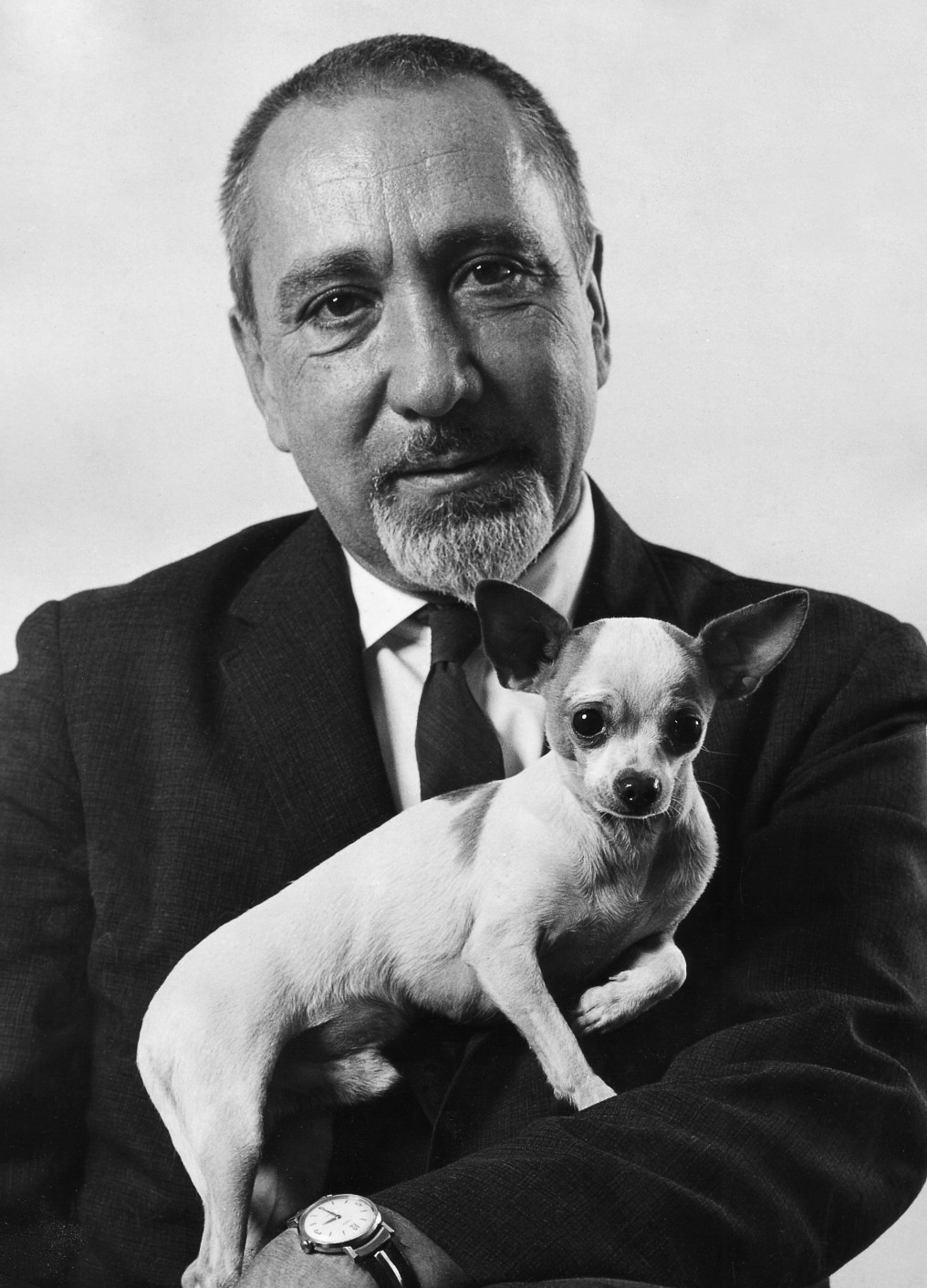
- Born: July 25, 1910; Athens, Ohio, United States
- Died: November 29, 1981 (aged 71); Los Angeles, California, United States
- Occupation: Novelist
- Children: Stephen Foster Crossen, Karen Crossen Ready, Kendra Crossen Burroughs, David Crossen
- Writing career
- Pen name: Richard Foster, Bennett Barlay, Kent and Clay Richards, M. E. Chaber

Kendell Foster Crossen (July 25, 1910 – November 29, 1981) was an American pulp fiction and science fiction writer. He was the creator and writer of stories about the Green Lama (a pulp and comic book hero) and the Milo March detective and spy novels.

His pen names included Richard Foster, Bennett Barlay, Kent Richards and Clay Richards, Christopher Monig (the name of the ghost of the town of Crossen on the Oder), and M.E. Chaber (from the Hebrew word mechaber, meaning author). Some bylines use the abbreviated name Ken Crossen.

== Biography ==
Kendell Foster Crossen was born in Albany, Ohio (outside Athens), the only child of farmers Sam Crossen and Clo Foster Crossen. He attended Rio Grande College in Ohio on a football scholarship. He was an amateur boxer and worked at jobs ranging from carnival barker to insurance investigator. In the 1930s he was employed as a writer on Works Progress Administration (WPA) projects, including a New York City Guidebook, before becoming editor of Detective Fiction Weekly in 1936.

In the 1940s he wrote pulp detective fiction and novels under his own name as well as the pseudonyms Richard Foster, M.E. Chaber, Christopher Monig, Clay Richards, Bennett Barley, and others. He originated the pulp and comic book character the Green Lama, a crime-fighting Buddhist superhero whose powers emerged upon the recitation of the Tibetan mantra "Om mani padme hum". He wrote hundreds of radio scripts for The Green Lama, Suspense, The Saint, Mystery Theater, and others. His later television credits include 77 Sunset Strip, The Man from Blackhawk, Man and the Challenge, and Perry Mason. Crossen was one of the founders of the Mystery Writers of America and the uncredited editor of its first anthology, Murder Cavalcade (1946).

In the 1950s Crossen began writing science fiction for publications such as Thrilling Wonder Stories, including the humorous Manning Draco stories about an intergalactic insurance investigator (four of which are collected in Once Upon a Star: A Novel of the Future, 1953). His novels in the genre are Year of Consent (1954), dealing with an America run by tyrannical "social engineers", and The Rest Must Die (1959), about survivors of a nuclear catastrophe in New York City. Novellas include Passport to Pax (1952) and Things of Distinction (1952). He edited two sci-fi anthologies, Adventures in Tomorrow (1951) and Future Tense (1952).

Crossen's papers and works are collected at the Howard Gotlieb Archival Research Center at Boston University.

== Milo March ==
A successful series of tightly plotted novels about a brandy-drinking, poetry-quoting New York insurance investigator named Milo March was published under the name M.E. Chaber from the mid-1950s to the early 1970s: Hangman’s Harvest (1952), No Grave for March (1953), As Old as Cain (1954), The Man Inside (1954; made into a 1958 film), The Splintered Man (1955), A Lonely Walk, based on the Wilma Montesi case (1956), The Gallows Garden (1958), A Hearse of Another Color (1958), So Dead the Rose (1959), Jade for a Lady (1962), Softly in the Night (1963), Six Who Ran (1964), Uneasy Lies the Dead (1964), Wanted: Dead Men (1965), The Day It Rained Diamonds (1966), A Man in the Middle (1967), Wild Midnight Falls (1968), The Flaming Man (1969), Green Grow the Graves (1970), The Bonded Dead (1971), and Born to Be Hanged (1973). In some of these plots, March is called to duty in the U.S. Army Reserve. Notable among these is The Splintered Man, in which he rescues the West German head of counterespionage police kidnapped by the East Germans (a character loosely based on Otto John), who are forcing him to take LSD as a mind-control experiment. In 1967, also under the name M.E. Chaber, Crossen published The Acid Nightmare, a cautionary young adult novel about LSD.

A final Milo March manuscript, set in Vietnam, was completed in 1975 but was unpublished during the author's lifetime owing to a difference of opinion with his publisher, Holt, Rinehart & Winston, who told him it was "too political and too controversial."

Paperback Library reissued 20 Milo March novels from 1970 to 1971 (Born to Be Hanged didn't make it into the series). The same series included four novels featuring insurance investigator Brian Brett: Abra-Cadaver, The Burned Man, Once Upon a Crime, and The Lonely Graves, all as by Christopher Monig. The final book in the series is The Tortured Path, written as by Kendell Foster Crossen, featuring Major Kim Locke of the CIA, on assignment in Communist China. Two other Kim Locke novels, in which Locke works with a military dog, were omitted from the Paperback Library series: The Big Dive and The Gentle Assassin, the latter as by Clay Richards.

In 2020–2021, Steeger Books (formerly Altus Press) reprinted the whole Milo March series, including Born to Be Hanged, now in paperback for the first time; the previously unpublished work, Death to the Brides; and six Milo March short stories collected under the title The Twisted Trap.
