= Murmur =

Murmur commonly refers to:

- Breathy voice, a type of phonation in speech, also known as a "murmured voice"
- Heart murmur, a pathologic heart sound produced as a result of turbulent blood

Murmur may also refer to:

== Music ==
- Murmur (album), the 1983 debut R.E.M. album
- Murmur (EP), a 2009 EP by The Sight Below
- Murmur (record label), an imprint of Sony Music Australia
- Murmur, a 2007 album by Yoko Shimomura
- "Murmur", a song by John Frusciante from the 2001 album From the Sounds Inside
- Murmurs (album), a 2006 album by Caroline Lufkin album
- The Murmurs, an American band

== Films ==
- Murmur (2019 film), a Canadian docufiction film
- Murmur (2022 film), a film directed by Mark Polish
- Murmur (2025 film), a Tamil horror film by Hemnath Narayanan

== Characters ==
- Murmur (DC Comics), a male supervillain from The Flash comic book
- Murmur (Marvel Comics), a female psychic superhero from the group Alpha Flight or a different male mutant character related to Hellions
- Murmur (demon), a Great Duke and Earl of Hell
- James "Murmur" Zancone, a character in The Sopranos (played by Lenny Venito)

== Computing ==
- Murmur, the corresponding server to the communication software Mumble (software)
- MurmurHash, a non-cryptographic hash function

== Other uses ==
- mürmur, a New York City podcast
- Murmur (placoderm), a genus of placoderms
- Murmuration, a swarming behavior of starlings
- Mur Murs, documentary film
