= Dragonfly (AC Comics) =

Comics character

- Dragonfly, on the cover of Americomics #4. Art by Jerry Ordway

Publication information
- Publisher: AC Comics
- First appearance: Americomics #4 (Oct. 1983)
- Created by: Rik Levins

In-story information
- Alter ego: Nancy Arazello
- Team affiliations: Femforce; Sentinels of Justice
- Abilities: Flight; Super-strength; Telekinesis
Dragonfly
Publication information
- Format: Limited series
- Genre: Superheroine
- Publication date: 1986 – 1987
- No. of issues: 8

Dragonfly is a comic book superheroine. Created by Rik Levins, she debuted in Americomics #4 (October 1983) and starred in her own self-titled series.

== Publication history ==
After a one-page advertising insert that appeared in Americomics #3, Dragonfly made her first appearance in issue #4. She was spun off into her own eponymous title that ran for eight issues (1985-1987). Though published by AC Comics, the series was both owned and funded by creator Rik Levins. According to AC president Bill Black, the Dragonfly contract stipulated that 70% of profits would go to Levins and 30% to AC Comics, but in practice the title consistently broke even. After Dragonfly became a member of the Femforce, she appeared semi-regularly in that magazine's run.

== Fictional character biography ==
Dragonfly is the secret identity of Nancy Arazello, one-time friend of Ken Burton, an engineer obsessed with the occult. In his researches, Ken finds a coded diary belonging to John Gallegher, a male Dragonfly who died in 1957. Using his computer skills, Ken decodes the diary and arranges to perform the mystic ritual that summons Zzara. Nancy interrupts this ceremony at a critical moment and is transformed into Dragonfly.

Nancy later learns that Zzara is an extradimensional insect-god (or demon, opinions vary). Zzara used an image from Nancy's subconscious, "her ideal of perfect feminine beauty", a statuesque platinum blonde, and used it as the basis for Dragonfly. He modified it, stamping his identifying marks, which included compound eyes and diaphanous wings. Nancy's mind supplied more prosaic details, such as a zipper in the black body suit with a white dragonfly emblem on the chest, 4-inch heels, and sunglasses to hide the eyes. When Nancy does not inhabit the Dragonfly body, it is stored in an extradimensional crystal sphere that maintains the body's original specifications.

== Powers and abilities ==
Thanks to the mystical rays of Zzara, Dragonfly is given an idealized body that can fly (she can reach speeds of Mach 4), super-strength, and the ability to move objects with her mind.

== Reception ==
For The Slings & Arrows Comic Guide, Dragonfly had an "oddball opening", but it "quickly became a routine, if not badly done, superheroine feature".
