= Ultima (comics) =

Ultima is a fictional character appearing in American comic books published by Marvel Comics. The character first appeared in Savage She-Hulk #9 (October 1980).

== Fictional character biography ==
Ultima Wordman uses her willpower to increase her strength, but was defeated by the She-Hulk.
