= Sin (comics) =

Sin, in comics, may refer to:

- Sin (Marvel Comics), the daughter of the Red Skull
- Sin (DC Comics), an adopted daughter of Black Canary
- Sin Comics (Jay Stephens, 1993–1994), Black Eye Productions

== See also ==
- Sin (disambiguation)
