= Children of the Atom (comics) =

2021 comic book series

- Cover to Children of the Atom #1, art by R.B. Silva

Publication information
- Publisher: Marvel Comics
- Schedule: Monthly
- Publication date: March – August 2021
- No. of issues: 6
- Main character(s): Cyclops-Lass; Gimmick; Cherub; Marvel Guy; Daycrawler

Creative team
- Written by: Vita Ayala
- Artist(s): Bernard Chang; Paco Medina; Cover Artist; R.B. Silva; Erick Arciniega; Jesus Aburtov
- Letterer: VC's Travis Lanham
- Colorist(s): Marcelo Maiolo; David Curiel
- Editor(s): Senior Editor; Jordan D. White; Editor; Shannon Andrews Ballesteros; Head of X Jonathan Hickman

Children of the Atom is a comic book series written by Vita Ayala, and illustrated by Bernard Chang and Paco Medina and published by Marvel Comics. The title was launched in March 2021 as part of Reign of X, a relaunch of Marvel's X-Men related titles.

The series focuses on the teen vigilantes operating in New York City using alien technology and pretending to be mutants in order to join Krakoa.

== Publication history ==
Children of the Atom was originally announced in January 2020 for an April 2020 debut, but the series was delayed due to the onset of the COVID-19 pandemic. It was eventually announced to come out in January 2021 and later rescheduled for March 2021 debut. The series is part of the X-Men line's Reign of X, following the conclusion of X of Swords crossover.

It was advertised as the introduction of the teenage vigilantes as the X-Men's sidekicks. Writer Vita Ayala calls this series “the only human perspective book that we have in the X-line right now.” They also mentioned that the series is from the point of view of the teenagers who idolize the X-Men growing up and see and them as superheroes.

The characters made a cameo appearance in the story "Race" featured in Marvel's Voices #1.

== Plot ==
The Children of the Atom are teen vigilantes living in New York City dreaming of joining their heroes, the X-Men, on Krakoa. They stop Hell's Belles during a robbery on one of their missions, which earns praise from the X-Men while raising concerns from the Avengers that the teens are putting themselves in danger, due to Kamala's Law still being in effect.

During one of their attempts to use the gateway to enter Krakoa, the Children of the Atom are captured by the U-Men before being rescued by the X-Men. It is then revealed that the teens are non-mutants and are using alien technology to emulate their powers:

- Cyclops-Lass (Beatrice Bartholomew) – Heat beam technology inside her visor.
- Cherub (Gabriel Brathwaite) – Flight via exosuit and sonic blast from his hand harp.
- Gimmick (Carmen Maria Cruz) – Absorption and manipulation of kinetic energy through her gauntlets.
- Marvel Guy (Benjamin Thomas) – Chemically induced suggestions through pheromones released from his gloves.
- Daycrawler (Jason Thomas) – Short-range teleportation field generator on his belt.

This development results in rejection from the X-Men, questioning their actions claiming themselves as mutants. However, the X-Men thanks them in their efforts of disbanding an anti-mutant hate group and locating three lost citizens. After receiving an invitation to the Hellfire Gala, Gimmick is revealed as the only mutant in the team, possessing shapeshifting abilities. This revelation causes friction in the group, resulting in Gimmick leaving the team for Krakoa. She later rejoined the team to stop Hordeculture from stealing Krakoan flowers.

== Cancellation ==
Series writer Vita Ayala confirmed that Children of the Atom ended its run with issue #6, released in August 2021.

== Reception ==
At the review aggregator website Comic Book Roundup, the series received an average score of 7.8 out of 10 based on 64 reviews. AIPT reviewer Dan Spinelli stated that after a series of delays, the comic book is absolutely worth the wait bringing the young heroes to life with humor and the soap operatics the X-Men are known for. ComicBook.com reviewer Chase Magnett notes that the series failed to provide an effective focus for the characters and the conclusion is deeply unsatisfying as each page is spent on individual characters monologue on what they learned.

=== Prints ===
#	Publication Date	Writer	Artist	Colorist	Comic Book Roundup Rating	Estimate Sales to North American retailers (first month)
1	March 10, 2021	Vita Ayala	Bernard Chang	Marcelo Maiolo	8.1 by 18 professional critics	Data not yet available
2	April 14, 2021	Vita Ayala	Bernard Chang	Marcelo Maiolo	7.3 by 12 professional critics	Data not yet available
3	May 12, 2021	Vita Ayala	Paco Medina	David Curiel	8.2 by 11 professional critics	Data not yet available
4	June 9, 2021	Vita Ayala	Paco Medina	David Curiel	7.7 by 9 professional critics	29,158
5	July 7, 2021	Vita Ayala	Paco Medina	David Curiel	7.5 by 8 professional critics	26,932
6	August 11, 2021	Vita Ayala	Paco Medina	David Curiel	8.3 by 6 professional critics	Data not yet available

== Collected editions ==
#	Title	Material collected	Pages	Publication date	ISBN
1	Children of the Atom by Vita Ayala – Volume 1	Children of the Atom #1–6 Marvel's Voices #1 (X-Men story)	184	October 19, 2021	ISBN 978-1302921736
