= Sentinels of Justice =

Fictional organisation

Publication information
- Publisher: Americomics (a.k.a. AC Comics)
- First appearance: August 1983
- Created by: Bill Black

In-story information
- Member(s): American Crusader; Avenger; Black Venus; Captain Flash; Catman; Darkfire; Hood; Jet Girl; Kitten; Miss Masque; Reddevil; Rocketman; Yankee Girl; List of Sentinels of Justice members

Sentinels of Justice is a fictional organization of superheroes. The comic was published by Americomics (a.k.a. AC Comics) in 1983 during a brief time that AC was able to license the Charlton Comics superheroes before the rights were purchased outright by DC Comics. The team consisted of Captain Atom, Blue Beetle, the Question and Nightshade. This line-up's first appearance was in Americomics Special #1 (August 1983). A revised team made up of existing Americomics characters Captain Paragon, Nightveil, Stardust, Commando D, and Scarlet Scorpion would appear in Captain Paragon and the Sentinels of Justice #1–3 (1985–86), the title would change to Sentinels of Justice with #4 (the indicia would still state Captain Paragon and the Sentinels of Justice), it would last until issue #6 (1986).

== Fictional team history ==
AC Comics editor and head writer Bill Black had been making plans for a superhero team to be named the Sentinels of Justice when he was contacted by Charlton Comics with a request that AC provide material for the Charlton Bullseye comic book. The team concept was quickly revised, with a roster of Charlton characters. Bullseye was cancelled before the story could be published, but AC was granted a limited license to publish the material already prepared for Charlton.

After AC received news that the series was cancelled, Black returned to his original plan for a team consisting of existing Americomics characters. A house ad for the revamped Sentinels team appeared on the back cover of the only published adventure of the team of Charlton characters.

A relaunch of the team took place in Femforce #59 with members being from the Vault of Heroes project.
