= Nightveil =

- Nightveil, as the Blue Bulleteer on the cover of Femforce #38 (1991).

Publication information
- Publisher: AC Comics
- First appearance: as Phantom Lady: Captain Paragon #1 (1972) as Nightfall: Bill Black's Fun Comics #4 (March 1983) as Nightveil: Nightveil #1 (1984) as Blue Bulleteer: FemForce Special #1 (Fall 1984)
- Created by: Benjamin Smith

In-story information
- Alter ego: Laura Wright
- Species: Human (formerly); Witch (currently)
- Team affiliations: Femforce
- Notable aliases: Blue Bulleteer; Nightfall; Mystic Maid
- Abilities: Magic; Peak-level athleticism

Nightveil is a fictional character, a superheroine who appears in the Femforce comic book, published by AC Comics. An adaptation of the Golden Age superhero Phantom Lady, she has also been known as Blue Bulleteer and Nightfall. Her secret identity is Laura Wright, daughter of a member of the United States Senate.

== Publication history ==
Nightveil (in her Blue Bulleteer identity) is an adaptation of the Golden Age superhero Phantom Lady. AC believed that the copyrights to the original character and stories had lapsed and were now in the public domain, but DC Comics asserted that it owned the rights to the character. AC declined to challenge the larger publisher.

In her first appearance, Captain Paragon #1 (1972), she was named The Phantom Lady. In Bill Black's Fun Comics #4 (March 1983), she became Nightfall. She was renamed Nightveil in Nightveil #1 (1984). She first appeared as Blue Bulleteer in FemForce Special #1 (Fall 1984).

== Fictional character biography ==
Laura Wright was born on December 4, 1920. She began her crimefighting career as the masked Blue Bulleteer, using a pair of firearms to battle evil. In the 1960s, Laura became the pupil of an otherworldly being Azagoth. He took her to another dimension called Limbo for sorcery training. Then, she later reappeared on Earth as Nightveil, with her youth restored and ready to fight crime again. Nightveil combats supernatural villains like the Black Shroud, Gorgana, and her nemesis Alizarin Crimson.

== Powers and abilities ==
Originally, Laura have no superpowers, but fought evil as the Blue Bulleteer, a costumed markswoman. After a near-fatal injury, she was rescued by the wizard Azagoth, who has given her genuine mystical powers (such as teleportation, flight, intangibility, and elemental control). Even as a witch, Nightveil still maintains her agility.

== Live appearances ==
In live appearances, Nightveil is played by Mary Capps.

Capps made appearances at conventions as Nightveil until 2007, her last appearance being at Visioncon in Springfield, Missouri. It was at this point that Visioncon declined to re-invite her because of lack of fan interest. She has said, however, that even if she had been invited, she would not have been able to make the trip from Texas.

=== Film ===
In 2005, AC Comics released the low-budget live-action movie Nightveil: Witch War. It starred Mary Capps in the title role. Her husband, Chuck Capps, played a jewel thief, with Maria Paris as Nightveil's nemesis, Alizarin Crimson/Lenore Stratten.

Nightveil and the Sorcerers Eye - 2010 - Maria Paris as Nightveil - 49 minutes - Bill Black - director & producer.
