= Femforce =

Comic book

- Front cover of Femforce #64

Publication information
- Publisher: AC Comics
- First appearance: Femforce #1 (1985)

In-story information
- Member(s): Miss Victory; She Cat; Nightveil; Synn; Tara; Rayda; Stardust; Colt; Firebeam

Femforce is a comic book published by AC Comics that began publication in 1985, detailing the adventures of the titular team: the "Federal Emergency Missions Force" or "Femforce", some of them original creations, while others originated in the 1940s and 1950s, lapsing into the public domain by the time Femforce was published. The team are, as their name implies, all superheroines, and are the first and the longest running all-women 'super-team'. The series has passed 200 issues, a significant milestone for an independent comic book company. Writers on the book have included Bill Black, Stephanie Sanderson, Mark Heike, Paul Monsky, Enrico Teodorani and Francesca Paolucci. Artists on the book have included Bill Black, Stephanie Sanderson, Mark Heike, Brad Gorby, Jeff Austin, Dave Roberts and Rik Levins.

== Fictional history ==
The team was formed by Miss Victory, She Cat, the Blue Bulleteer and the original Rio Rita in the 1940s during World War II, in which they fought as aides to the allied forces. After the war, Rio Rita retired. The rest of the Femforce continued to operate as an offshoot of the U.S. government, most of them kept young by their super-powers. In 1960, Blue Bulleteer was assaulted by thugs and nearly killed but was luckily taken in by Azagoth, a being from another dimension. When she returned from Azagoth's home dimension as the sorceress Nightveil she brought a new ally, the reality-altering Synn, with her.

Later members in the 1980s were weapons mistress Colt and the environmentalist Tara. The group also met up with the granddaughter of their old member Rio Rita, who was using the same codename as her grandmother though she never officially joined the team. When a villain, Black Commando, forced Ms. Victory to overdose on V-45, the serum that gave her powers, it altered her mind and she became a renegade named 'Rad'. and was replaced on the team by her now-adult daughter Jennifer, who became a second Ms. Victory. Once her mother returned and took over as leader of the team again, Jennifer's life gradually grew worse before she herself became a second Rad. In the 1990s, new members included the alien warrior Stardust, the ghost Firebeam, electric-powered Rayda, and briefly, the heroines Dragonfly and Thunderfox.

The Femforce's military liaison was initially a man named General Gordon, an old school and somewhat sexist soldier who occasionally clashed with his female allies. Gordon was later replaced by General Roberta Strock who was considerably friendlier to the Femforce's cause. Other allies have included the Sentinels of Justice and the so-called "Vault of Heroes", a group of costumed crimefighters placed in suspended animation in the 1940s by the mystic, Dr. Weird (the Vault was AC Comics' method of reviving a number of public domain superheroes from now-defunct publishing companies of the Golden Age of Comic Books).

== Team members ==
The lineup of Femforce has frequently changed over the decades of the team's existence but has included the following characters:

- Miss Victory: Real Name: Joan Wayne. Powers: Superhuman strength, flight and invulnerability. Based on the original Golden Age Miss Victory. Team leader.
- She Cat: Real name: Jessica Hunt. Powers: Enhanced strength with advanced agility and reflexes. Based on the Harvey Comics version of Black Cat.
- Nightveil: Real Name: Laura Wright. Powers: Sorcery, flight, dimensional travel. Originally a gun-toting heroine named Blue Bulleteer. The Blue Bulleteer identity is based on the Fox Feature Syndicate version of Phantom Lady (not to be confused with the Quality Comics/DC Comics character of the same name).
- Rio Rita: Real Name: Rita Farrar. A spy from Spain, she retired and was eventually succeeded by her granddaughter. She had no powers. Based on Fiction House's Senorita Rio.
- Synn: Real name: Silva Synn. Powers: Illusions, flight, matter manipulation.
- Tara: Real name: Tara Fremont. Powers: Size changing, ability to communicate with animals. Inspired by Sheena, Queen of the Jungle and other jungle girl characters of the 1940s and 1950s.
- Rayda: Real name: Dyna Morisi. Powers: Electricity manipulation, enhanced reflexes.
- Stardust: Real name: Dr. Mara. Powers: Flight, superhuman strength, energy bolts.
- Colt: Real name: Valencia Kirk. Powers: None, though she is an expert in espionage, weapons technology. Temporarily took over as team leader after the original Miss Victory became the villainess Rad; was later replaced as team leader when Joan Wayne's daughter, Jennifer, became the new Ms. Victory.
- Firebeam: The ghost of a woman killed in a house fire, whose spirit can now control fire.
- Ms. Victory: Real name: Jennifer (Wayne) Burke. Daughter of the original Miss Victory, Joan Wayne. Later became the anti-heroine Rad. Powers: Superhuman strength, flight and invulnerability.
- Dragonfly: Real name: Nancy Arazello. Powers: Superhuman strength, telekinesis and flight.
- Thunderfox: A fictional comic book character brought to life by Nightveil's magic. Later fades from existence when her comic is cancelled. Powers: Superhuman strength and invulnerability.

== Other characters ==
- Garganta: Real name: Carol Heisler. Powers: Size-changing and telepathy. Originally an elderly scientist turned into a young blonde, later made an auxiliary Femforce member. Writers Dominique Mainon and James Ursini described Garganta as a modern example of the giantess rooted in the myth of the Amazons. A live-action film featuring Garganta was produced by Bill Black.
- Yankee Girl: Real name: Lauren Mason. Powers: Flight, superhuman strength, invulnerability. Based on the original Golden Age Yankee Girl.
- Fem Paragon: A fascist tyrant from another dimension and leader of the armies of Rur.

== Topics ==
Femforce was a superhero comic but also occasionally featured Weird West stories.

== Adaptations ==
SuperBabes: The Femforce Role-Playing Game was published in 1993.
