= AC Comics =

American comic book publishing company

- Company type: Private
- Industry: Comic books
- Founded: 1969; 57 years ago
- Founder: Bill Black
- Headquarters: Longwood, Florida, U.S.
- Owner: Bill Black
- Website: http://www.accomics.com

AC Comics (formerly known as Paragon Publications and Americomics) is a comic book publishing company started by Bill Black.

AC Comics specializes in reprints of Golden Age comics from now-defunct companies whose properties lapsed into public domain and were not reprinted elsewhere. It also publishes a number of Modern Age adventures starring the Golden Age superheroes that appeared in those stories. The most famous of those titles is Femforce, which features the adventures of an all-female superhero team, one of the first teams of this nature in the comics industry.

Based on its focus on Golden Age reprints and stories inspired by that style, AC has developed a reputation for straightforward, fun, and action-packed superhero tales which often avoid the darker themes of many modern comics. AC artists often make use of a style known as "good girl art", made popular in the Golden Age era, which combines attractive, clean linework with elements of Pin-up model#cheesecake and humor. In addition to superheroes, AC has attempted to preserve other comic book genres inspired by the series of the past, such as Westerns and jungle adventure.

== History ==
=== Paragon Publications ===
AC Comics was founded as "Paragon Publications" in 1969, and released the first issue of Paragon Illustrated magazine in Fall of that year, followed by its first comic titles—Paragon Presents and White Savage—in 1970. Other titles from Paragon's beginnings included Fem Fantastique and Paragon Golden Age Greats (1971), Macabre Western and Captain Paragon (1972), Paragon Magazine and Paragon Super Heroes (1973), Tara on the Dark Continent (1974), and Paragon Western Stars (1975). The company's early titles were cheaply published black-and-white comics. Though the company published several titles simultaneously, they were only able to produce a total of three issues a year, since nearly all writing, inking, and editing on the comics was done by Bill Black himself during this period.

=== Americomics ===
In 1982, the company changed its name to "Americomics" before settling on "AC Comics" in 1984. The original plan behind the reintroduction as Americomics was to narrow the lineup to a single full-color anthology series, Americomics, which the publisher could put out on a consistent basis, rather than the earlier model of several black-and-white titles published sporadically.

The first issues of Americomics coincided with the independent comics boom, and the publisher responded to this unexpected success by expanding its lineup of titles to include several creator-owned series, such as Dragonfly. However, most of these titles were produced and funded by the creators themselves, with minimal creative oversight from Americomics.

=== AC Comics ===
In 1985, AC debuted Femforce, which it still publishes today. Other AC series include Best of the West (1998–2009) and the ongoing Men of Mystery Comics. Following the popularity of size-changing Femforce members Garganta and Tara, AC made the giantess concept a recurring theme in their comics. Tapping into this cult following, AC has released stories and anthologies specifically catered to fans of giant women, as well as DVD releases which embrace this theme in the tongue-in-cheek style of 1950s science fiction B-movies. An ongoing giantess feature known as Gargantarama has even been added to the company's Femforce title.

By 1986, AC Comics had expanded to a staff of roughly 25 people. Production was largely handled through the mail, since only a handful of staff resided anywhere near AC's Florida headquarters.

AC has expanded into other DVD projects which collect classic movie serials and other material now in the public domain, as well as low-budget films based on their own characters.

== Licenses ==
AC Comics had used Charlton Comics characters, particularly the Blue Beetle and Captain Atom, in the comic title Sentinels of Justice. When the rights for these characters were sold to DC Comics, AC Comics created a second Sentinels of Justice team (writing the first out of continuity), composed of some of its original characters as well as ones from the public domain. Many of these are homages to Charlton and Quality Comics heroes, such as the Scarlet Scorpion (a stand-in for Blue Beetle) and the Blue Bulleteer (later Nightveil) who is based on the Fox Comics version of Phantom Lady. Still another Phantom Lady-inspired character was The Black Mistress, whose first episode was scripted by former Vampirella writer T. Casey Brennan.
