= Fantastic Comics (Ajax-Farrell) =

Bi-monthly comic book

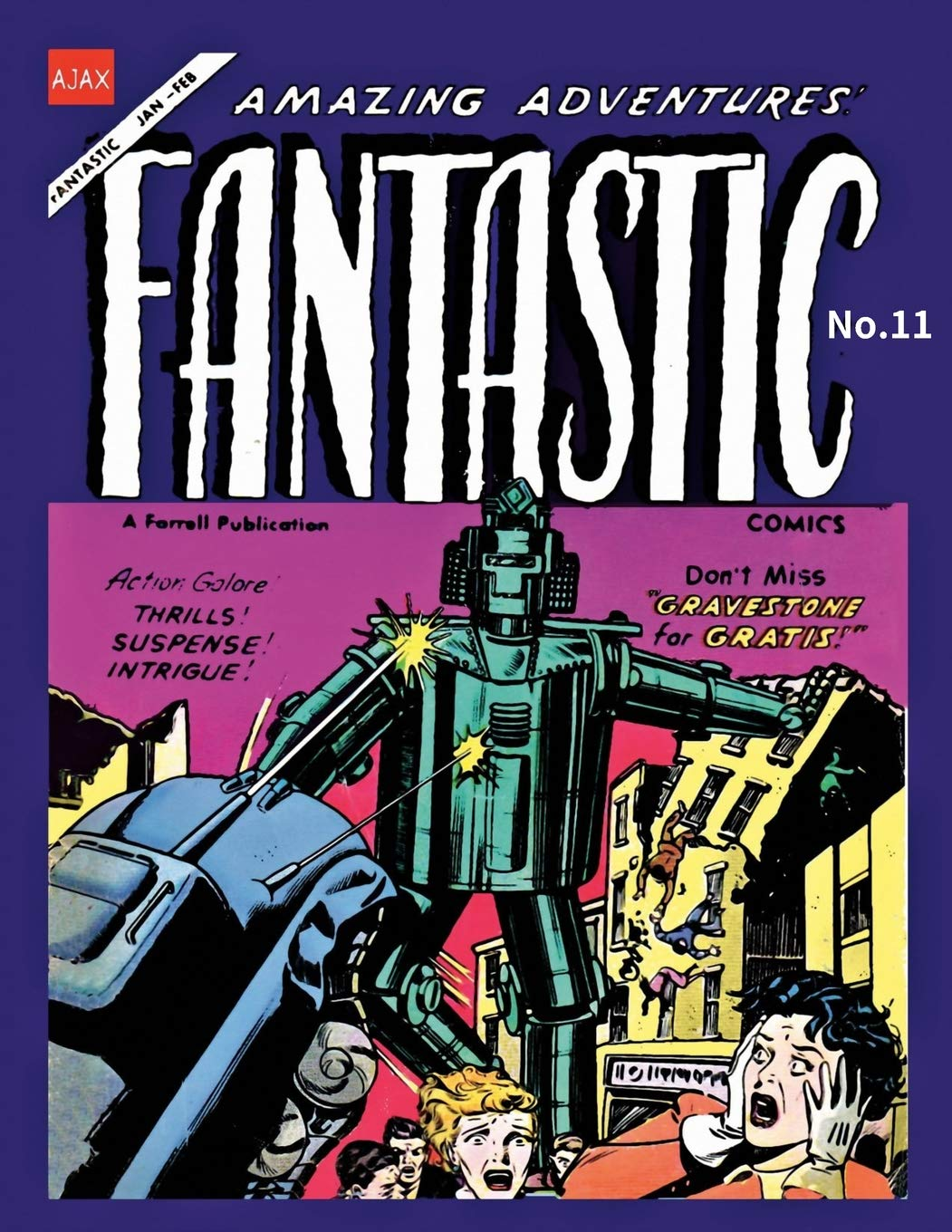
- Fantastic Comics #11 (1955)

Publication information
- Publisher: Ajax-Farrell
- Schedule: Bi-monthly
- Format: Anthology
- Publication date: May 1953 — September/October 1954 (Fantastic Fears); November/December 1954 — January/February 1955 (Fantastic Comics)
- No. of issues: 11

Creative team
- Created by: Iger Shop
- Written by: Frank Belknap Long, Bruce Hamilton
- Penciller(s): Robert Webb, Ken Battefield, Steve Ditko
- Inker(s): Robert Webb, Steve Ditko
- Letterer: Ben Oda
- Editor: Ruth Roche

Fantastic Comics was a 36-page, bi-monthly, comic book anthology produced by the Iger Shop and published by the comic book publisher, Ajax-Farrell from November/December 1954 to January/February 1955. Picking up from its predecessor series, Fantastic Fears, Fantastic Comics started its issue numbering at 10, rather than 1 and consisted primarily of Horror comics, with other genres such as Science fiction, War, and Adventure being present in its other stories. In the wake of sentiments of the 1940s and the 1950s, Fantastic Comics likely saw a crackdown by the public, the government, and the industry, as its story content can be speculated to have violated various elements of the Comics Code Authority's 1954 code, and with these reactions, and the decline in sales they presented, the book likely ceased publication after its January/February 1955 issue. Following its suspension, Fantastic Comics was superseded in issue number by the Ajax-Farrell issues of Samson in April 1955.

== Noted Professionals ==
During its run, Fantastic Comics, and its predecessor series, Fantastic Fears, had a number of notable professionals from the comic book industry working on its various issues and stories, among them are Frank Belknap Long, who produced the script for the story "Druid's Castle" in Fantastic Fears #3 (September 1953), Steve Ditko, who produced the pencil work and ink for the story "Stretching Things" in Fantastic Fears #5 (January 1954), Ken Battefield who produced the pencil work for the story "Green Horror" in Fantastic Fears #8 (July/August 1954), and Ben Oda who produced the lettering for the aforementioned story "Stretching Things" from Fantastic Fears #5 (January 1954).

== Content ==
Being a Pre-Code comic book anthology, much of the content found in both Fantastic Comics and in its predecessor series, Fantastic Fears, likely went against much of the sensibilities of society at the time, as several of its horror and horror Esq stories featured content involving violence, horror tropes, mild sexuality and other content that most weren't ready for at the time. In particular, stories such as "Gravestone for Gratis" from Fantastic Comics #11, for example, which featured a character known as the "Banbury Ghoul", who is an undead ghoulish figure that feasted on corpses, violated the Comics Code Authority's 1954 code of "Scenes dealing with, or instruments associated with walking dead, torture, vampires, ghouls, cannibalism, and werewolfism are prohibited.", while other stories, such as "If a Body Kill a Body" from Fantastic Fears #9, violated the Comics Code Authority's code of "Sex perversion or any inference to same is forbidden", via its display of subtle or inferred sexual intimacy between its characters on its title page. This content, among other undesirable content, as cited by Frederic Wertham, landed many horror and crime based comic publishers in heavy controversy at the time, and lead to swift repercussions from both the government and the public, strangling sales and forcing publishers to cancel crime and horror type books, based on both reputation and local government mandates, as was the case in Oklahoma City, and Houston, which each placed bans on crime and horror comic books. In regards to Fantastic Comics, the controversy could potentially be said to have caused the title to cease in 1955, as its violations of the Authority's 1954 code, the reputation garnered of these types of genre titles by society and the government, and the strangling of sales due to all of the factors above, likely forced its publisher, Ajax-Farrell, to cancel the title in response, in order to salvage its image.

== Reprints ==
Following its discontinuation in 1955, a number of stories from Fantastic Comics and its predecessor series Fantastic Fears, were reprinted over the years by other publishers such as Eerie Publications' in their series, Terror Tales, and IDW in their title, "Ghosts: Classic Monsters of Pre-Code Horror Comics". Among them are the stories, "Gravestone for Gratis", which was reprinted in Terror Tales v1#7 (March 1969) from its debut in Fantastic Comics #11 (January/February 1955), "The Tiger's Paw", reprinted in Terror Tales v4 #4 (June 1972), from its debut in Fantastic Comics #11 (January/February 1955), "Fate Laughs At Clowns", which was reprinted in Terror Tales v3 #5 (September 1971), from its debut in Fantastic Comics #10 (November/December 1954), "Scream No More, My Lady", reprinted in Terror Tales v1 #10 (November 1969), from its debut in Fantastic Comics #10 (November/December 1954), and "If a Body Kill a Body", reprinted in "Ghosts: Classic Monsters of Pre-Code Horror Comics" (2019), from its debut in Fantastic Fears #9 (September/October 1954).
