= I. W. Publications =

Defunct American comic book publishing company

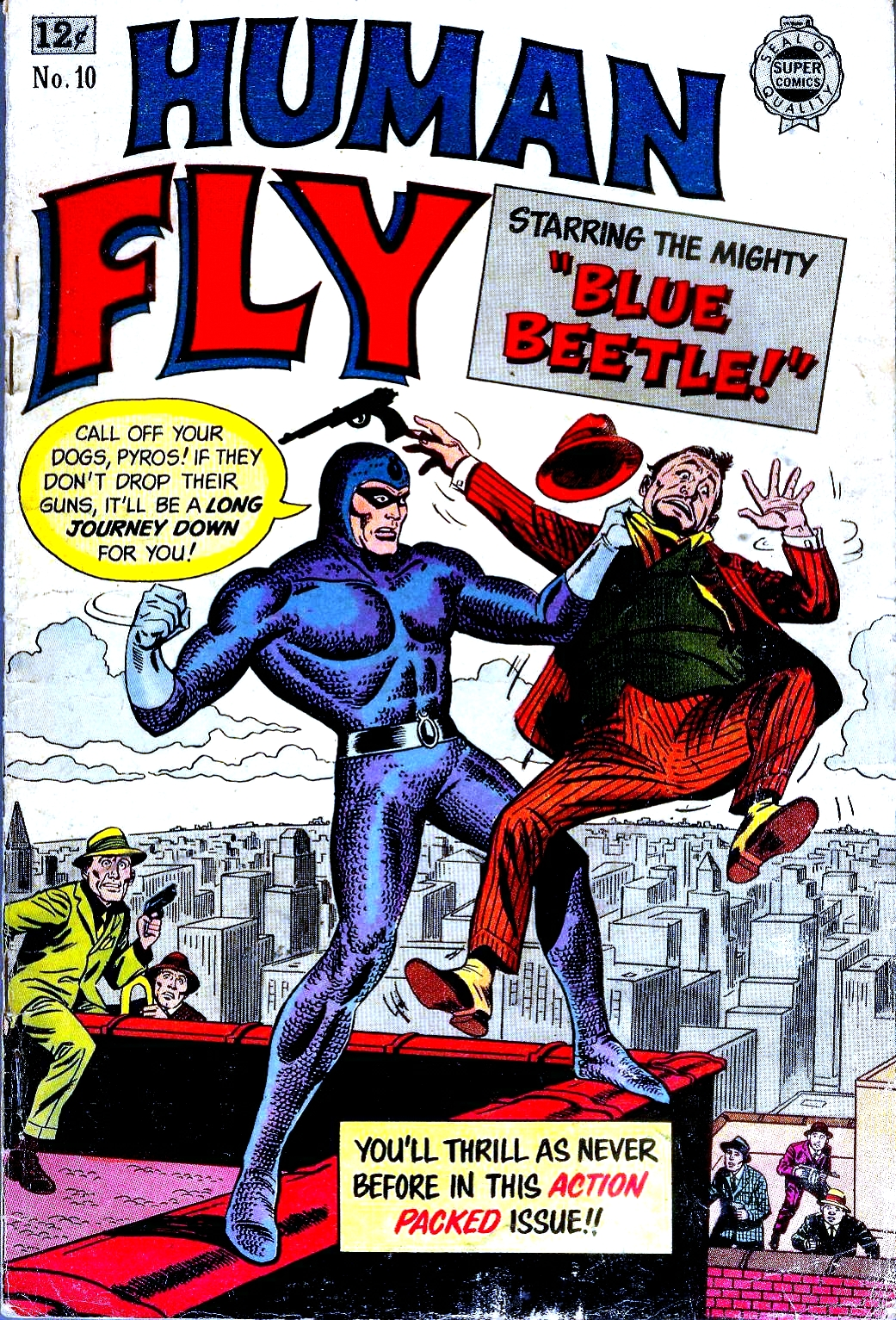
- I.W. Publications's Human Fly #10 (1963), reprinting material from Fox Feature Syndicate's Blue Beetle
- Parent company: I. W. Enterprises
- Founded: 1958
- Founder: Israel Waldman
- Defunct: 1964
- Country of origin: United States
- Headquarters location: New York City
- Publication types: Comic books
- Fiction genres: Adventure, crime, science fiction, Western, horror, war, romance comics, funny animal, superhero
- Imprints: Super Comics

I.W. Publications (also known as Super Comics) was a short-lived comic book publisher in the late 1950s and early 1960s. The company was part of I.W. Enterprises, and named for the company's owner, Israel Waldman. I.W. Publications was notable for publishing unauthorized reprints of other publishers' properties. Usually these companies were already out of business.

I.W. Publications published comics in a wide variety of genres, including adventure, crime, science fiction, Western, horror, war and romance comics, as well as funny animal and superhero titles. The company was known for its low-budget products: most of I.W.'s comics were sold in grocery and discount stores, often in "three comics for a quarter" plastic bags. The numbering of most of the company's titles is misleading, often not starting at issue #1 and skipping issue numbers. The company produced 118 separate titles, but only 332 individual issues (many titles only published a single issue).

The company published one comic book with original material: Marty Mouse #1 (1958), featuring funny animal stories by Vincent Fago, among others.

Some I.W./Super Comics titles used original cover art: illustrators included Jack Abel, Ross Andru, Sol Brodsky, Carl Burgos, Mike Esposito, and John Severin, with lettering by Ben Oda.

== History ==
Following the publication of Fredric Wertham's Seduction of the Innocent and the 1954 comic book hearings of the United States Senate Subcommittee on Juvenile Delinquency, many comic book publishers closed down shop in the years 1954–1956. Other than I.W., no new publishers debuted in 1958. Comics historian Don Markstein explained the company's methods:

Waldman was able to sell them cheaply because in many cases, he was able to supply the letterpress plates they were printed from, and thus avoid paying for new ones. How a man who gives little evidence of being interested in comics before emerging as an extremely low-end publisher, came to have such production materials is simply that he bought out defunct publishers' storage facilities, purchasing physical materials only and ignoring intellectual property rights. In many cases, he dealt with Eastern Color Printing, which did most of America's comics, for materials their publishers had left behind when they went out of business.

The company started publishing in 1958, with comics originally published by Avon Comics, Fiction House, Magazine Enterprises, and others. Many of these comics had the tagline "A Top Quality Comic." After releasing a great quantity of comics in 1958, the company went on hiatus until 1963, when it again released a number of comics up into 1964. During the latter half of the company's existence, it published comics under the "Super Comics" name. Many of these titles were reprints of Toby Press, Avon, Magazine Enterprises, and Quality Comics. Many of these titles had the tagline "Super Comics Seal of Quality."

I.W. Publications went out of business in 1964. Waldman would later be involved with the short-lived black-and-white comics magazines publisher Skywald Publications in the 1970s.

== Publishers whose work was reprinted in I.W. Publications comics ==
- Ace Comics (defunct, 1956)
- Avon Comics (defunct, 1956)
- Baily Publishing Company (defunct, 1946)
- Cambridge House Publishers (defunct, 1945)
- Chesler / Dynamic (defunct, 1946)
- Comic Media (defunct, 1954)
- Decker (defunct, 1957)
- EC Comics (defunct as comics publisher, 1956)
- Farrell Publications / Four Star Publications (defunct, 1958)
- Fiction House (defunct, 1955)
- Fox Feature Syndicate (defunct, 1950)
- Green Publishing (defunct, 1957)
- Iger Studios (defunct, 1955)
- Key Publications (defunct, 1956)
- Kiddie Kapers Company (defunct, 1945)
- Magazine Enterprises (defunct, 1958)
- Mainline Publications (defunct, 1956)
- Master Comics (defunct, 1955)
- Medal Comics / Timor Publications (Stanley Morse) (defunct, 1956)
- Nesbit (defunct, 1955)
- Novack Publishing (defunct, 1945)
- Novelty/Premium/Curtis (defunct, 1949)
- Prize Comics (defunct, 1963)
- Quality Comics (defunct, 1956)
- Reston Publications (defunct, 1955)
- Spark Publications (defunct, 1946)
- St. John Publications (defunct, 1958)
- Stanhall Publishing (defunct, 1954)
- Star Publications (defunct, 1954)
- Superior Publishers Limited (defunct, 1956)
- Timely Comics / Atlas Comics / Marvel Comics
- Toby Press (defunct, 1955)
- Youthful (defunct, 1954)
- Ziff-Davis Comics (defunct, 1953)

== Titles ==
Title	Pub. dates	# of Issues	Original publisher	Original title	Genre	Notes
Algie	1964	1	Timor	Algie	teen humor	
Apache	1958	1	Fiction House	Apache	Western	
The Avenger	1958	1	Magazine Enterprises	The Avenger	superhero	
Battle Stories	1963–1964	7	Avon, Farrell, Magazine Enterprises, Superior, Toby	various	war	
Billy and Buggy Bear	1958, 1963–1964	3	Timely	All Surprise Comics	funny animal	
Black Knight	1963	1	Toby	The Black Knight	adventure	
Blazing Sixguns	1958	10	Fox, Key Publications, Mainline, Timor, Youthful	various	Western	
The Brain	1958, 1963	9	Magazine Enterprises	The Brain	humor	
Buccaneer / The Buccaneers	1958, 1963–1964	3	Quality	The Buccaneers	adventure	
Buster Bear	1958	2	Novelty	Frisky Fables	funny animal	originally published in 1947
Candy	1963–1964	3	Quality	Candy	teen humor	
Casper Cat	1958, 1963	3	Timely	Dopey Duck	funny animal	originally published in 1946
Cosmo Cat	1958	1	Fox	Cosmo Cat	funny animal	
Cowboys 'N' Injuns	1958, 1963	3	Magazine Enterprises	Tick Tock Tales	humor	originally published in 1951
Danger	1963–1964	7	Dynamic Publications, Novack, Novelty, Timely, Toby	various	omnibus	includes a Nemo in Adventureland story by Bob McCay called "Morpheus's War"
Danger is Our Business	1958	1	Toby	Danger is Our Business	crime	
Daring Adventures	1963–1964	9	Avon, Fox, Star, Novelty, Spark, Superior	various	horror-suspense	Issue 18#
Dogface Dooley	1958	2	Magazine Enterprises	Dogface Dooley	military humor	
Doll Man	1963–1964	3	Quality	Doll Man	superhero	
Dr. Fu Manchu	1958	1	Avon	The Mask of Dr. Fu Manchu	adventure	
Dream of Love	1958	4	Magazine Enterprises, Toby	various	romance	
Dynamic Adventures	1958	2	Fiction House, Avon	various	omnibus	
Dynamic Comics	1958	1	Superior	Dynamic Comics	omnibus	
Eerie / Eerie Tales	1958, 1963–1964	7	Avon, Bernard Baily, Fiction House, Novelty, Star, Toby	various	horror-suspense	
Famous Funnies	1963–1964	3	Avon, Farrell, Novelty, St. John	various	funny animal	
Fantastic Adventures	1963–1964	7	Chesler, Farrell, Iger, Nesbit, Star, Toby	various	omnibus	
Fantastic Tales	1958	1	Avon	City of the Living Dead	horror-suspense	
Fighting Daniel Boone	1958	1	Avon	Fighting Daniel Boone	omnibus	
Firehair	1958	1	Fiction House	Firehair	Western	
Foxhole	1963–1964	6	Magazine Enterprises, Mainline, Toby	various	war	
Frontier Romances	1958	2	Avon, Fiction House	various	Western romance	
Full of Fun	1958	1	Bernard Baily	various	humor	
Great Action Comics	1958	3	Cambridge House, Fox	Golden Medal Comics (Cambridge), Phantom Lady (Fox)	superhero	
Great Western	1958	4	Magazine Enterprises	various	Western	includes a large quantity of Straight Arrow stories
Gunfighters	1963–1964	5	Farrell, Magazine Enterprises, Toby	various	Western	
Hollywood Secrets of Romance	1958	1	Quality	Hollywood Secrets	romance	
Human Fly	1958	2	Fox	Blue Beetle	superhero	
Indian Braves	1958	1	Ace	Indian Braves	Western	
Indians of the Wild West	1958	1	Fiction House	Indians	Western	
Intimate Confessions	1958, 1963–1964	4	Avon	Intimate Confessions	romance	
Jet Power	1958	2	Magazine Enterprises	Jet Power	science fiction	
Jungle Adventures	1963–1964	5	Avon, Fiction House, Fox, Novelty, Star	various	jungle adventure	
Jungle Comics	1958	1	Fiction House	Jungle Comics	jungle adventure	
Ka'a'nga	1958	2	Fiction House	Ka'a'nga	jungle adventure	
Kat Karson	1958	1	Magazine Enterprises	Cowboys 'N' Injuns	Western humor	
Kid Koko	1958	2	Magazine Enterprises	Koko and Kola	funny animal	
Kiddie Kapers	1963	4	Magazine Enterprises, Timor	Cowboys 'N' Injuns (Magazine Enterprises), Animal Adventures (Timor)	funny animal	
Kit Carson	1963	1	Avon	Kit Carson	Western	
Krazy Krow	1958, 1963	3	Timely	Krazy Krow	funny animal	
Leo the Lion	1958	1	Green Publishing	Adventures of Patoruzu	funny animal	
Little Eva	1958, 1963–1964	14	St. John	Little Eva	humor	
Little Spunky	1958	1	Novelty	Frisky Fables	funny animal	
Love and Marriage	1958, 1963–1964	7	Quality, Superior	various	romance	
Malu in the Land of Adventure	1958	1	Avon	Slave Girl Comics	adventure	
Man o' Mars	1958	1	Fiction House	various	science fiction	
Marmaduke Monk	1958, 1963	2	Ace	Monkeyshines Comics	funny animal	
Marty Mouse	1958	1	N/A	N/A	funny animal	not a reprint; apparently original material from Vincent Fago, among others
Master Detective	1964	1	Novelty	Criminals on the Run	crime	
Meet Merton	1958, 1963	3	Toby	Meet Merton	teen humor	
Mighty Atom	1958	1	Magazine Enterprises	Mighty Atom and the Pixies	fantasy	
Muggsy Mouse	1958, 1963	3	Magazine Enterprises	Muggsy Mouse	funny animal	
Muggy-Doo, Boy Cat	1963–1964	2	Stanhall	Muggy-Doo, Boy Cat	funny animal	
My Secret Marriage	1958	1	Superior	My Secret Marriage	romance	
Mystery Tales	1964	3	Avon, St. John, Toby	various	horror-suspense	
Pee-Wee Pixies	1958, 1963	3	Magazine Enterprises	Pee-Wee Pixies	fantasy	
Pinky the Egghead	1958, 1963	3	Comic Media	Pinky the Egghead	humor	
Planet Comics	1958	2	Fiction House	Planet Comics	science fiction	
Plastic Man	1963	3	Quality	Plastic Man	superhero	
Police Trap	1963–1964	4	Mainline	Police Trap	crime	
Purple Claw	1958	1	Toby	Purple Claw	horror-suspense	
Realistic Romances	1958	3	Avon	Realistic Romances	romance	
Red Mask	1958	3	Magazine Enterprises	Red Mask	Western	
Robin Hood	1958, 1963–1964	5	Magazine Enterprises	Robin Hood	adventure	
Romantic Love	1958, 1963	5	Avon, Toby	Romantic Love (Avon), Great Lover Romances & Young Lover Romances (Toby)	romance	
Sensational Police Cases	1958	1	Avon	Prison Break	crime	
Sharpy Fox	1958, 1963	3	Green Publishing, Kiddie Kapers Company, Timely	various	funny animal	
Sheena, Queen of the Jungle	1958	1	Fiction House	Sheena, Queen of the Jungle	jungle adventure	
Silver Kid Western	1958	2	Key Publications / Medal Comics	Silver Kid Western	Western	
Space Comics	1958	1	Avon	Space Comics	science fiction	
Space Detective	1958	2	Avon	Space Detective	science fiction	
Space Mysteries	1958	2	Atlas, Fiction House	Journey into Unknown Worlds (Atlas), Planet Comics (Fiction House)	science fiction	
Speedy Rabbit	1958, 1963	3	Key Publications	Peter Cottontail	funny animal	
The Spirit	1963–1964	2	Quality	The Spirit	superhero	itself reprints of material from The Spirit section
Star Feature Comics	1958	1	Quality	Feature Comics	crime	
Strange Mysteries	1958, 1963–1964	8	Avon, Chesler/Dynamic, Farrell, Four Star, Fox, Master Comics, Star, Toby	various	horror-suspense	
Strange Planets	1958	8	Atlas, Avon, EC, Novelty, St. John	various	science fiction	
Strange Worlds	1958	1	Avon	Strange Worlds	science fiction	
Sunny, America's Sweetheart	1958	1	Fox	Sunny, America's Sweetheart	teen humor	
Super-Brat	1958	6	Toby	Super-Brat	humor	
Super Rabbit	1958	3	Timely	Super Rabbit	superhero funny animal	one issue does not contain any Super Rabbit stories on the inside
Teen Romances	1963–1964	5	Star	Popular Teen-Agers	romance	
Teen-Age Talk	1958	3	Key Publications, Superior, Stanhall	various	teen humor	
Tell It To the Marines	1958, 1963–1964	3	Toby	various	war	
Three Rascals	1958	3	Magazine Enterprises	Clubhouse Rascals	humor	
Tippy Terry	1963	2	Reston	Little Groucho	humor	
Tom-Tom The Jungle Boy	1958, 1963	4	Magazine Enterprises	Tick Tock Tales	funny animal	
Top Adventure Comics	1958	2	Decker, Superior, Ziff-Davis	various	adventure	
Top Detective Comics	1958	1	Novelty	Criminals on the Run	crime	
Top Jungle Comics	1958	1	Avon	White Princess of the Jungle	jungle adventure	
Torchy	1964	1	Quality	Torchy	humor	
Tuffy Turtle	1958	1	Green Publishing	Ribtickler	funny animal	
U.S. Fighting Air Force	1958	2	Superior	U.S. Fighting Air Force	war	
U.S. Fighting Men	1963–1964	7	Avon, Superior, Timely, Toby	various	war	
U.S. Paratroops	1958	2	Avon	U.S. Paratroops	war	
U.S. Tank Commandos	1958	2	Avon	U.S. Tank Commandos	war	
Undersea Commandos	1964	1	Avon	Fighting Undersea Commandos	war	
Wacky Duck	1958, 1963	4	Timely	Wacky Duck	funny animal	
Wacky Woodpecker	1958	2	Toby	Two-Bit the Wacky Woodpecker	funny animal	
Wambi	1958	1	Fiction House	Wambi, Jungle Boy	jungle adventure	
Western Action	1958	1	Avon	Cow Puncher Comics	Western	
Westerner	1963–1963	3	Farrell, Quality, Timor	various	Western	
Whip Wilson	1958	1	Timely	Whip Wilson	Western	
Wild Bill Hickok	1958, 1963–1964	4	Avon	various	Western	
Wild Western Roundup	1958	1	Decker, Ziff-Davis	Wild Western Roundup (Decker), Kid Cowboy (Ziff-Davis)	Western	
Young Hearts In Love	1963	2	Prize	Young Love	romance	
Ziggy Pig	1958	4	Timely	Ziggy Pig	funny animal	
