= Arthur Peddy =

Comic book artist

- Peddy during World War II
- Born: December 26, 1916
- Died: May 15, 2002 (aged 85) Norwalk, Connecticut, US
- Areas: Penciller, Inker
- Pseudonym: Kenneth Julian
- Notable works: Phantom Lady; Jann of the Jungle; Justice Society of America; Heap

Arthur F. Peddy (December 26, 1916 – May 15, 2002) was an American comic book and advertising artist best known for co-creating Quality Comics' superhero character Phantom Lady and Atlas Comics' jungle girl character Jann of the Jungle. He also was known for a stint as penciler of the superhero team the Justice Society of America for what later became DC Comics.

Peddy began his art career during the late-1930s and 1940s that period fans and historians call the Golden Age of Comic Books and remained active in the medium into the 1970s, when he began concentrating on commercial art and advertising.

Pop artist Roy Lichtenstein's 1965 painting Sound of Music is based on a Peddy comic-book panel.

== Early life and career ==
Arthur Peddy entered the fledgling comic book field in 1938 at Eisner & Iger, one of a handful of "packagers" that would produce outsourced comics on demand for publishers experimenting with the new medium, and continued there after Eisner departed in 1940 and it became the S. M. Iger Studio. Peddy's first known comic-book work was the four-page Western feature "Waco Kid" in publisher Fox Comics' Mystery Men Comics #1 (cover-dated Aug. 1939). For that publisher as well as for Fiction House and Quality Comics, he drew seafaring stories, jungle adventures, science-fiction stories and other genre tales. With writer Toni Blum. he shared the pen name Lance Blackwood on at least one story starring Merlin the Magician, a descendant of Arthurian Merlin, in Quality's National Comics #8 (Feb. 1941). On his own he initially used the pseudonym Kenneth Julian for the police feature "Rookie Rankin" in Quality's Smash Comics before reverting to his real name.

With an unknown writer, Peddy co-created the female superhero Phantom Lady in Quality's Police Comics #1 (Aug. 1941) and continued to draw her adventures through issue #13 (Nov. 1942).

Peddy enlisted in the U.S. Army in 1942, during World War II, serving in the Signal Corps with what his stepson in 2014 recalled as the 530th 63rd Signal Aircraft Warning Battalion, Company B, 19th Tactical Command, 9th Air Force, throughout the European Theater of Operations through 1945, rising to the rank of technical sergeant. His comics work, perhaps stockpiled, continued to appear in Quality and Fiction House comic books through at least cover-date August 1943.

== Postwar through 1960s ==
After the war, for Hillman Periodicals, Peddy had runs penciling the aviator hero Airboy and the muck-monster the Heap variously from 1946 to 1948.

In 1947, Peddy additionally began penciling for All-American Publications, one of the companies that would evolve into DC Comics. With inker Bernie Sachslate, generally credited as Bernie Sachs, he formed the Peddy and Sachs Studio, which lasted through 1953 and included inker Jack Abel for a time. Features on which they worked include the superhero adventure "Dr. Mid-Nite", the swashbuckler "The Black Pirate" and the aviator feature "Hop Harrigan", all in the flagship title All-American Comics, and the superhero feature "Wildcat" in Sensation Comics. Peddy penciled a run of the superhero team the Justice Society of America in All-Star Comics #42-57 (Sept. 1948 – March 1951). Starting in 1951, he worked primarily for Fawcett Comics and Ziff-Davis for two years, followed by a plethora of publishers including Atlas Comics, the 1950s precursor of Marvel Comics, as well as St. John Publications, Avon Comics and others.

Peddy and fellow comics artists George Evans and Edd Ashe, spearheaded by comics artist Bernard Krigstein, were among the founders of the industry's short-lived attempt at a labor union in 1952, The Society of Comic Book Illustrators. Peddy served as vice president under Krigstein, with Harry Harrison as secretary, Larry Woromay as treasurer, and Ross Andru, Ernie Bache, John Celardo, Morrie Marcus and Bernard Sachs as members-at-large. The organization went defunct shortly after publication of its third and final newsletter in June 1953.

The following year, Peddy and writer Don Rico created Atlas' jungle girl character Jann of the Jungle in Jungle Tales #1 (Sept. 1954). He was among several comic-book artists who contributed to the short-lived, black-and-white, satiric-humor magazine Lunatickle, published by Whitestone Publishing and edited by Myron Fass, in 1956, but otherwise continued to pencil standard color comics across a number of genres. He gradually specialized in war comics and romance comics for publisher DC Comics through 1957, and thereafter drew almost exclusively romance comics for DC's Falling in Love, Girls' Romances, Heart Throbs and Secret Hearts through at least 1968. His romance work continued on in reprints into the mid-1970s.

== Commercial and advertising art ==
Throughout the 1960s, Peddy began adding commercial and advertising art to his workload, primarily storyboards for television commercials, for products including Campbell Soup, Chevron, Hills Bros. Coffee, Pepsi, Pine Sol, Burger King. Quaker Oats, and DuPont. From 1970 to 1979, he worked for the advertising firm BBDO.

== Personal life ==
Peddy married the widowed Joanne Posner in April 1987, becoming stepfather to her sons Michael and Bruce Posner.

He died May 15, 2002, in Norwalk, Fairfield County, Connecticut.

== Legacy ==
Pop artist Roy Lichtenstein's 1965 painting Sound of Music is based on a Peddy comic-book panel.
