= Captain Flight Comics =

1940s American comic book series

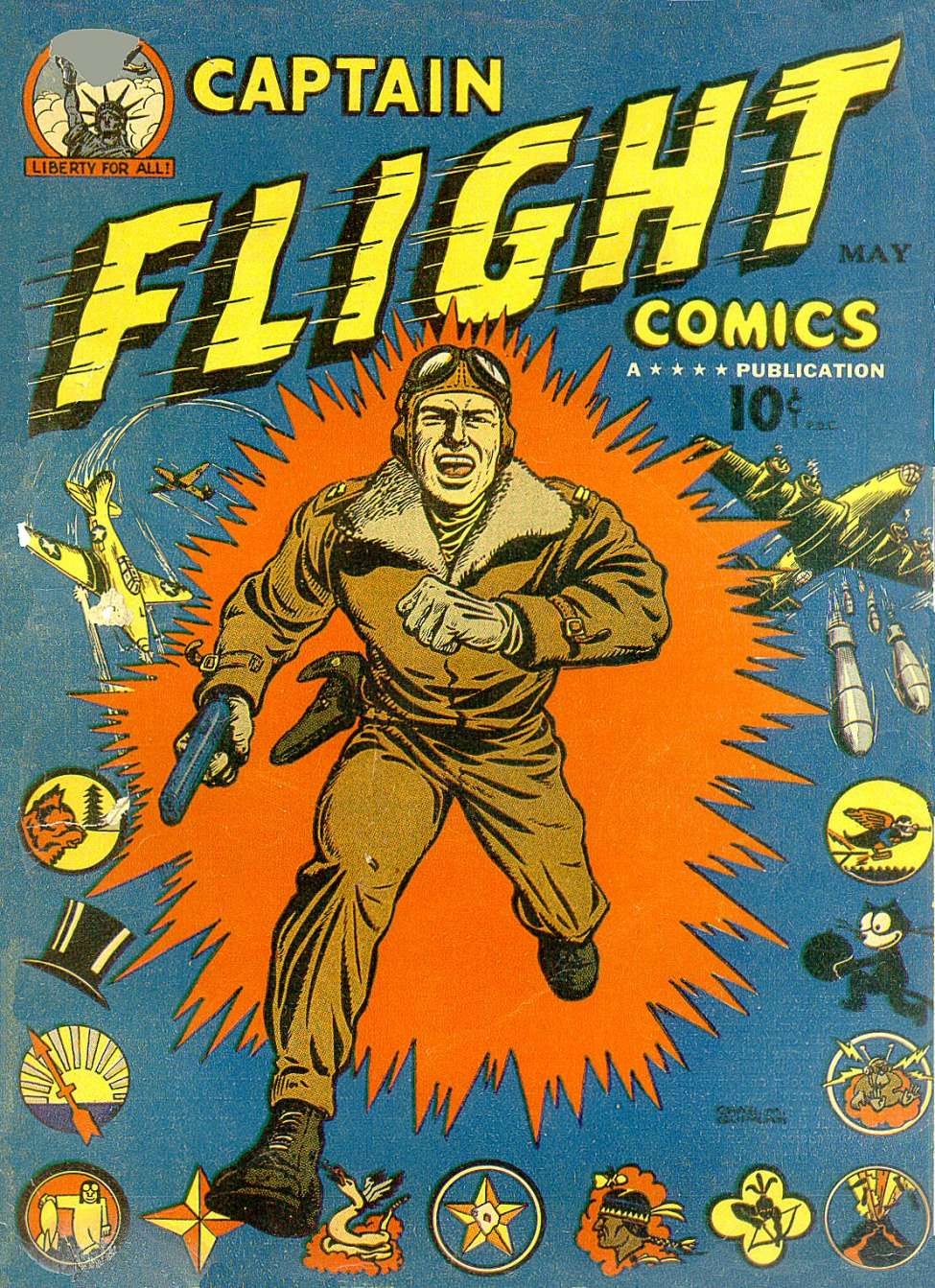
- Cover to Captain Flight Comics #2 (May 1944)

Publication information
- Publisher: Four Star Publications
- Schedule: Bimonthly
- Format: Standard
- Publication date: March 1944 – March 1947
- No. of issues: 11
- Main character(s): Captain Flight

Captain Flight Comics is an American comic book series published by Four Star Publications during the period that is known by fans and historians as the Golden Age of Comic Books. A total of eleven issues were printed from March 1944 to February 1947. Noted artist L.B. Cole contributed his distinctive cover illustrations to many of the issues.

== Regular features ==
- Captain Flight: The Captain is an inventor and pilot who fights the Nazis. He appears in all eleven issues of the title. He invents a "microbe plane" that's stolen and mass-produced for war, and he has to work with co-pilot Clark and girlfriend Lily to shoot down the flying fortress that controls the drones.
- Black Cobra: After originally appearing in Harry "A" Chesler's Dynamic Comics, the rights to the Black Cobra were purchased by Four Star. He debuted in Captain Flight Comics before receiving his own series. The Black Cobra is secretly Jim Hornsby, who adopts his costume identity to fight crime. He is accompanied by his younger brother Bob, alias Kid Cobra.
- Blue Flame: Appeared in issue #11. The Blue Flame has the ability to burst into flames and fly, similar to the Human Torch. His secret identity is not revealed.
- Grenade: Debuted in Captain Flight #5. Bruce Corbett adopts the secret identity of the Grenade after his brother is killed by a German handgrenade.
- Professor X: Called the "Crime Doctor", he appears in Captain Flight Comics #1 and #2. No background or origin is provided for this character. He is unrelated to the later Marvel Comics character, Professor X.
- Red Rocket: Debuted in issue #5. Rod Page adopts the costumed identity of the Red Rocket to fight crime.
- Torpedo Man: First appeared in issue #8. Don Wallace wears a costume that gives him the ability to fly. His secret base is located beneath the Statue of Liberty.
- Yankee Girl: This character originally debuted in Harry "A" Chesler's Punch Comics #1 (1941), in her secret identity of Kitty Kelly, an air hostess. She then appeared in the Yankee Girl costume in Captain Flight Comics #8, now with the ability to gain great strength in time of strength.
