= Wonder Boy (character) =

- Quality Comics' Wonder Boy

Publication information
- Publisher: Quality Comics, now DC Comics
- First appearance: I: National Comics #1 (1940); II: Team Titans #19
- Created by: I: Jerry Maxwell; II: Jeff Jensen, Phil Jiminez

In-story information
- Alter ego: Bobby Barnes; Donald Troy
- Team affiliations: II: Team Titans
- Abilities: Superhuman strength and stamina

Wonder Boy is the name of two fictional characters who have appeared as superheroes in comics published by Quality Comics and DC Comics. The original was an alien who appeared in National Comics. The second was a time-traveler from an alternate future who appeared in Team Titans.

== Quality Comics ==
Wonder Boy was a fictional Quality Comics character and superhero who first appeared in National Comics #1 (July 1940), in the story "The Boy from the Meteor". The character was created by writer Toni Blum and artist John Celardo.

With "the strength of a hundred full grown men", the nameless Wonder Boy fell to Earth from the planet Viro, destroyed when it "collided" with a star. Finding himself in Chicago, Illinois, he joined forces with Sgt. Crane of the Army Air Corps and began using his superhuman abilities to fight the Nazis, Axis spies and big-city crime. Cheering him on from the sidelines was sweetheart Sally Benson. He was soon called Wonder Boy by the public at large. Otherwise, he had no other name or a secret identity, and seemed to only wear the costume he was "born" wearing.

Most of the stories in which he appeared were only six pages long, so little was revealed about him other than that he was known for: having the strength of a thousand men, a girlfriend named Sally Benson, and a tendency for bombastic speeches.

Wonder Boy last appeared under the Quality Comics banner in National Comics #26 (November 1942), in an untitled story. The character reappeared two years later in Elliot Publishing Co's Bomber Comics (along with several other characters that originally appeared in National Comics). The circumstances behind the move are unclear. In 1955, he was one of the characters to be used by Ajax-Farrell Comics in Terrific Comics #16 and Wonder Boy #17 and 18. The character wouldn’t reappear again until 2025 in Nightwing Annual 2025, as a fictional character from a metafictional comic book series Gray Ghost and Wonder Boy as an allusion to Robin the Boy Wonder. Another refugee from the Golden Age of Comic Books to turn up in Wonder Boy #17 was Phantom Lady.

== DC Comics ==
=== Team Titans ===
The second Wonder Boy debuted in Team Titans #19 (April 1994), in the past along with several other Titans from an alternate future. They assisted the Team Titans on a mission, and afterwards the group decided to remain in the past. Shortly after the mission, Donna Troy addressed the Justice League assembly (led by Wonder Woman) and announced the United States government made a deal to allow the future Titans to remain in the past and act as paranormal operatives led by a government-appointed supervisor. During his next mission with the Titans, Wonder Boy teamed with Aqualad, Terra, Mirage, and other Titans for an undersea mission.

During the 1994 Zero Hour storyline, the alternate future where the Team Titans originated from is erased from continuity, and all the characters from the alternate future are erased from existence.

=== Bobby Barnes ===
In Wonder Woman #188, writer Phil Jiminez introduces a non-superpowered character, Bobby Barnes, nephew of Princess Diana's then-love interest Trevor Barnes. Bobby is a fan of Wonder Woman and follows her around for a day. At the end of the story, Wonder Woman presented him with a Wonder Boy t-shirt and invites him to Themyscira for a celebration.

=== Donald Troy ===
Donald Troy, also known as Wonderous Boy, is a member of the Earth-11's Teen Justice. The mentee of Wonder Man, he is the male version of Donna Troy/Wonder Girl and was created by Ivan Cohen and Eleonora Carlini, first appearing in DC's Very Merry Multiverse #1 (February 2021). In the gender-reversed reality of Earth-11, Troy is in a romantic relationship with the male version of Raven. His origin is apparently confusing, a nod to his female counterpart's infamous convoluted history, as even the world's greatest detective Batwoman (female version of Batman) is unable to make sense of it and Donald's own memories are fuzzy.

== See also ==
- Captain Wonder
- Olympian
- Wonder Man
