= Phantom Lady =

Comic book superheroine

- Phantom Lady (Stormy Knight) in the promotional interior art for Uncle Sam and the Freedom Fighters #4 (October 2006). Art by Daniel Acuña.

Publication information
- Publisher: Originally Quality Comics; Later Fox Feature Syndicate, among others Currently DC Comics
- First appearance: (Sandra); Police Comics #1 (August 1941) (Dee); Action Comics Weekly #636 (January 1989) (Stormy); Crisis Aftermath: The Battle for Blüdhaven #1 (Early June 2006)
- Created by: (Sandra); The Eisner & Iger studio Arthur Peddy (penciler) (Dee); Len Strazewski (writer); Chuck Austen (penciller) (Stormy); Justin Gray (writer); Jimmy Palmiotti (writer)

In-story information
- Alter ego: Sandra Knight; Delilah "Dee" Tyler; Stormy Knight; Jennifer Knight
- Team affiliations: (Sandra); All-Star Squadron (Sandra, Delilah); Université Notre Dame des Ombres (Stormy); S.H.A.D.E. (Dee); Justice League (All); Freedom Fighters
- Abilities: Use of Black Light Bands grants: Invisibility; Intangibility; Illusion casting; Teleportation; Black ray goggles

Phantom Lady is a superheroine appearing in media published by Quality Comics and DC Comics. She was created by the Eisner & Iger studio, one of the first to produce comics on demand for publishers. The character's early adventures were drawn by Arthur Peddy.

As published by Fox Feature Syndicate in the late 1940s, Phantom Lady is a notable and controversial example of "good girl art", a style of comic art depicting voluptuous female characters in provocative situations and pin-up poses that contributed to widespread criticism of the medium's effect on children. The character was ranked 49th in Comics Buyer's Guide's "100 Sexiest Women in Comics" list.

== Character origin and early publication history ==
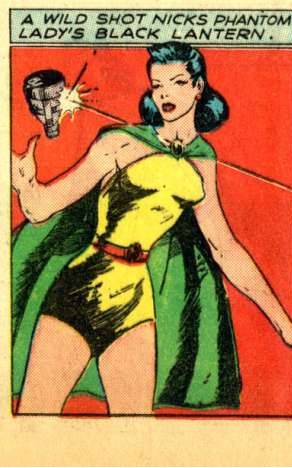
Panel from Quality Comics' Police Comics, depicting Phantom Lady's black ray gun

=== Quality Comics ===
Phantom Lady first appeared in Quality's Police Comics #1 (August 1941), an anthology title which also included the debut of characters such as Plastic Man and the Human Bomb. That issue established her alter ego as Sandra Knight, the daughter of U.S. Senator Henry Knight. The issue established that it was not her first appearance as the Phantom Lady, but it did not go into her origin. Stories published decades later by DC Comics would give her a proper origin, which was altered several times to give Sandra a more active role. Her skimpy costume was eventually explained as a deliberate tactic to distract her usually male foes.

Sandra Knight assumed the identity of Phantom Lady in a costume consisting of a green cape and the equivalent of a one-piece yellow swimsuit. She used a "black light projector", a device which allowed her to blind her enemies and make herself invisible. She drove a car whose headlights also projected black light when necessary. She was sometimes assisted by her fiance, Donald Borden, an agent of the U.S. State Department.

According to Jess Nevins' Encyclopedia of Golden Age Superheroes, "she fights the cowgirl Ace of Spades, the arsonist Fire Fiend, the Killer Clown, the Robbing Robot, the woman-killer the Subway Slayer, and the cloud-seeding saboteur the Vulture".

Phantom Lady ran as one of the features in Police Comics through #23. Arthur Peddy continued as the artist through #13, with Joe Kubert drawing her feature in Police Comics #14-16; Frank Borth in #17-21; Peddy again in #22; and Rudy Palais in #23. Phantom Lady also appeared in Feature Comics #69-71 as part of a crossover with Spider Widow and the Raven.

=== Fox Feature Syndicate and Star Publications ===
After Quality stopped publishing the adventures of Phantom Lady, what was now simply Iger Studios believed it owned the character and assigned it to Fox Feature Syndicate, a move that would later cause confusion as to who actually owned the character's copyright. The Fox version which premiered in Phantom Lady #13 (taking over the numbering of Wotalife Comics) is better known to contemporary comic fans than the Quality version because of the "good girl art" of Matt Baker. Baker altered her costume by changing the colors to red and blue, substantially revealing her cleavage, and adding high-cut loose shorts. Fox published Phantom Lady only through issue 23 (April 1949), though the character guest starred in All-Top Comics #8-17, also with art by Baker. Her rogue's gallery in these two Fox titles included the Avenging Skulls; the Fire Fiend; the Killer Clown; Kurtz, the Robbing Robot; the Subway Slayer and Vulture.

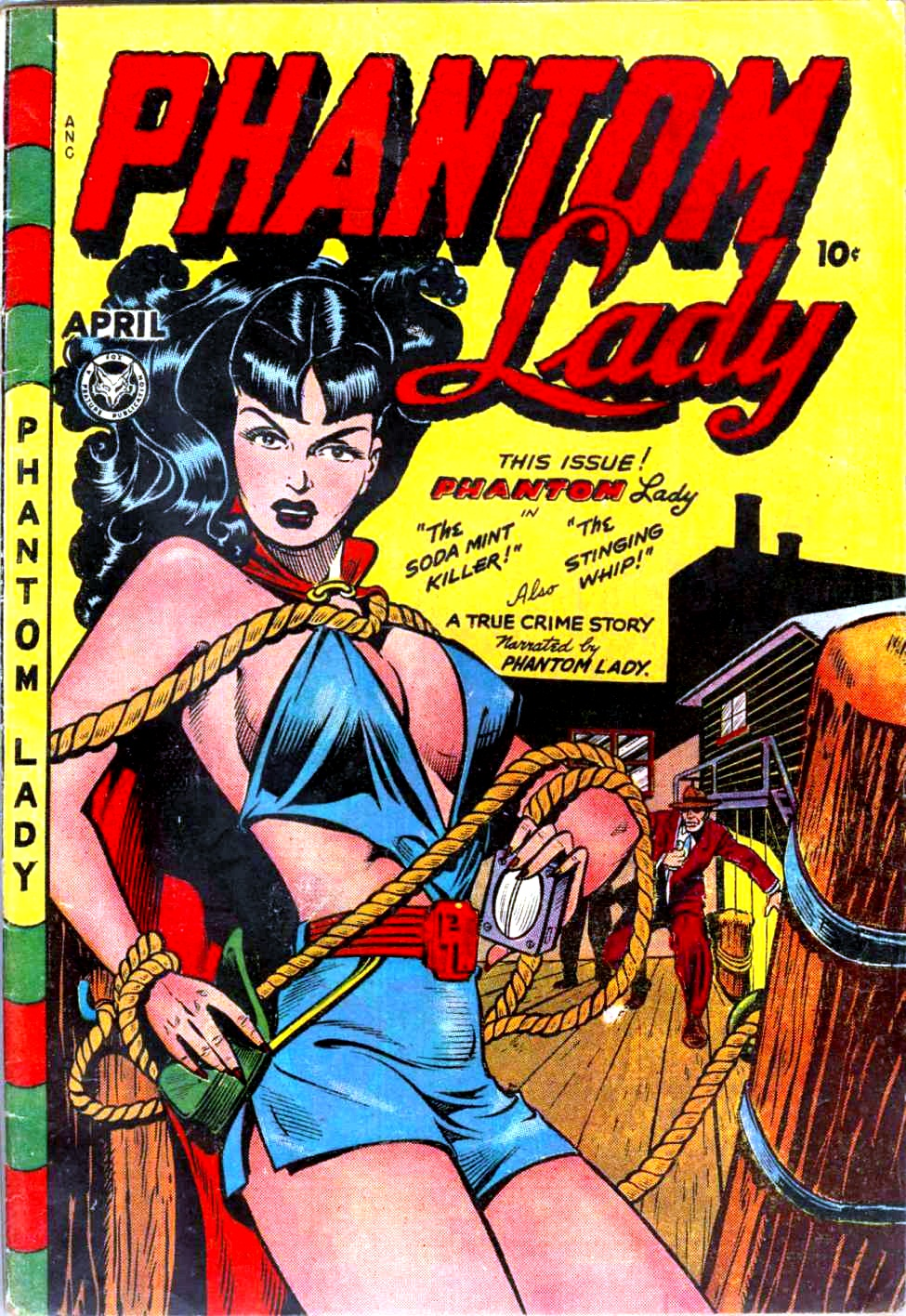
Phantom Lady #17 (April 1948), Fox Feature Syndicate, cover art by Matt Baker

Baker's cover for Phantom Lady #17 (April 1948) was reproduced in Seduction of the Innocent, the 1954 book by Dr. Fredric Wertham denouncing what he saw as the morally corrupting effect of comics on children. The cover, which illustrated Phantom Lady attempting to escape from ropes, was presented by Wertham with a caption that read, "sexual stimulation by combining 'headlights' with the sadist's dream of tying up a woman". In the meantime, Fox went under and its assets were acquired by other publishers, and a Phantom Lady story from All-Top was then reprinted as a backup feature in Jungle Thrills by Star Publications, which then itself went out of business.

=== Ajax-Farrell Publications ===
Ajax-Farrell Publications then published four issues of the second Phantom Lady title, cover dated Dec. 1954/Jan. 1955 through June 1955. The company also published her as a backup feature in two issues of Wonder Boy.

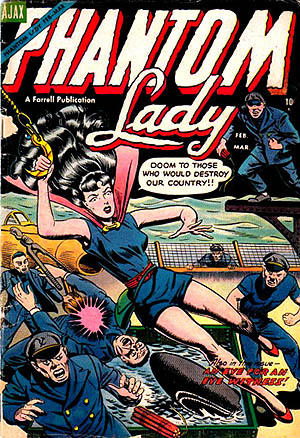
Phantom Lady (vol. 2) #2 (March 1955), Ajax-Farrell Publications

By then, Wertham's efforts had led to a Congressional investigation into the comics industry, and publishers formed the self-censoring Comics Code Authority in the fall of 1954. Some changes were consequently made to the Phantom Lady's costume, so that her cleavage was covered and shorts replaced her skirt.

=== Charlton Comics and I.W. Publications ===
Farrell's assets were later acquired by Charlton Comics, and, until DC relaunched the character in the 1970s, Phantom Lady's only appearances were in reprinted Matt Baker stories in the late 1950s and early 1960s. Israel Waldman's I.W. Publications (later Super Comics), a company that published unauthorized reprints from 1958 to 1964, included Phantom Lady reprints in issues of Great Action Comics and Daring Adventures. These comics featured new cover images of Phantom Lady that bore little visual consistency either to the Fox version of the character or each other (e.g., the character was blonde on one cover, brunette with a brown costume on another).

== DC Comics ==
=== Sandra Knight ===
Freedom Fighters #10 (October 1977). Phantom Lady fights Cat-Man, with fellow Quality superheroes the Human Bomb and Uncle Sam.

In 1956, DC Comics obtained the rights to the Quality Comics characters, which they believed included Phantom Lady, and reintroduced her 17 years later with a group of other former Quality heroes as the Freedom Fighters in Justice League of America #107 (October 1973).

As was done with many characters DC acquired from other publishers, or that were holdovers from Golden Age titles, the Freedom Fighters were relocated to a parallel world. Their particular earth was referred to as "Earth-X". On Earth-X, Nazi Germany had won World War II. The team was later featured in its own series for 15 issues (1976–1978), in which they temporarily left Earth-X for "Earth-1" (where most DC titles were set at the time) and Phantom Lady was given real phantom-like powers.

During the final issue of the original Freedom Fighters series, the writers gave the character an origin story. One night, Sandra happened across two would-be assassins targeting her father, and stealthily thwarted them with nothing more than a rolled-up newspaper. Knight consequently developed a taste for adventure and crime-fighting, and after finding a "black light ray projector" that a family friend named Professor Davis sent to her father, she adopted the device as a weapon.

In 1981, Phantom Lady became a recurring guest star of All-Star Squadron, a superhero-team title set on "Earth-2", the locale for DC's World War II-era superheroes, and at a time prior to when she and the other Freedom Fighters were supposed to have left for Earth-X. Phantom Lady then appeared with the rest of DC's superheroes in Crisis on Infinite Earths, a story that was intended to eliminate the confusing histories that DC had attached to its characters by retroactively merging the various parallel worlds into one. This left Phantom Lady's Earth-X days written out of her history, and the Freedom Fighters became a mere splinter group of the All-Star Squadron.

DC also retconned the origin of Phantom Lady established in Quality's Police Comics, so that she now belonged to the prestigious Knight family of Opal City, a locale central to DC's Starman line of heroes. Her formative story was changed so that she overtook her father's would-be assassins with her fists instead of a newspaper. Lastly, she was given a more active role in the acquisition of her black light ray, which she no longer received from a mere family friend but instead from a scientist named Dr. Abraham Davis, who had escaped from Nazi-controlled Europe. In the retelling, Sandra Knight gave asylum to Davis, setting him up in a laboratory and helping him to complete his invention. Ted Knight, now established as her cousin, also aided Davis, as a result acquiring the technology that allowed him to become the first Starman.

The 1994 title Damage established the post-World War II history for Phantom Lady. She was made an agent of a Cold War-era government intelligence agency called Argent, in which she met and married fellow former-All Star Squadron member Iron Munro (a character introduced in the 1986 series Young All-Stars). The two were paired on several missions and fought a Soviet-backed agent named The Baron, actually the German Baron Blitzkrieg, a foe both had met during World War II. Shortly after becoming pregnant, Sandra was kidnapped by The Baron who stole the fetus from her womb and left her for dead. After escaping from Communist Poland, Sandra wanted out of the spy game and turned to an old friend, Roy Lincoln. He helped her, and soon thereafter she started the Universite Notre Dame Des Ombres (the University of Our Lady of the Shadows) in the hopes of making further intelligence contacts and finding her baby, but she was not successful. Phantom Lady's presence in the U.S. and her work with American Intelligence was kept a secret to most; she never reunited with her husband, and in her old age became headmistress of the school she began, now a training center for female spies in Washington, D.C.

In Manhunter (vol. 3) #23 (June 2006), Phantom Lady met the current Manhunter, Kate Spencer, and it was revealed that she was Spencer's grandmother. Phantom Lady and Iron Munro were revealed to have had a child before their marriage whom they gave up for adoption—Walter Pratt, Spencer's father. The Golden Age Atom, Al Pratt, had allowed Phantom Lady to use his contact information so that she could get into a home for unwed mothers, causing the belief that the child was Pratt's son. Knight and Munro still keep in contact, as she brought him to meet Kate and her son, Ramsey.

=== Dee Tyler ===
Dee Tyler as the Phantom Lady: Action Comics Weekly #639, cover art by Kevin Nowlan

A second Phantom Lady, Delilah "Dee" Tyler, was introduced in Action Comics Weekly #636 (January 1989) and was given a back-up feature in that title through #641 with art by Chuck Austen. The daughter of the U.S. Attorney General, Tyler was trained by the original Phantom Lady, the now-elderly Sandra Knight, at the exclusive Université Notre Dame des Ombres (Our Lady of the Shadows) in France. She inherited Knight's equipment and costume.

It was heavily implied in that series that she was not alone in being thus trained and equipped, as her "college roommate" Marie Saloppe also appeared in the guise of Phantom Lady in Action Comics Weekly #639. Tyler's primary ability was an extensive knowledge of the martial art called savate, also known as French kickboxing. She also possessed a wrist-mounted blaster, and a holographic projector developed by her childhood friend and roommate Sarah that could be used to cast powerful illusions.

This successor Phantom Lady never received a series of her own, but was a periodic guest star in other titles, including the 1988 Starman, Flash, and most frequently in the 1994 Starman title. She joined a new version of the Freedom Fighters in the 1999 JSA series.

Phantom Lady was killed by Cheetah and Deathstroke during Infinite Crisis. In Blackest Night, she is temporarily resurrected as a Black Lantern.

=== Stormy Knight ===
Uncle Sam and the Freedom Fighters #1 (July 2006), cover art by Daniel Acuña

A new Phantom Lady was introduced in Crisis Aftermath: The Battle for Blüdhaven (2006), as one of the metahumans guarding Blüdhaven. She appears in the limited series Uncle Sam and the Freedom Fighters. Her name is Stormy Knight and, like the original character, her father is a U.S. Senator, though no connection to the other Knight characters has been established.

She seems to know Father Time and has hinted that they have met before with him in a different guise, referring to his look as "this year's look is Colonel Sanders, Time?" She acts like a spoiled movie star and treats her other teammates like the popular girl in high school would treat the geeks (especially the Human Bomb and Major Force), but shows some hint of respect for the new Doll Man, hinting that they worked together for some time. Her wristbands not only project light but can bend reality.

She does not maintain a secret identity. In Brave New World, a radio program names her as Stormy Knight. Like other members of the Blüdhaven team, this incarnation of Phantom Lady is a cold-blooded killer, although there are indications in issue #1 of Uncle Sam and the Freedom Fighters, as she finds herself defending her actions, that she may be disturbed by what she is ordered to do. Also in issue #1, her father is depicted in a more sympathetic light as a man who might disband the Blüdhaven team if elected. He is murdered on orders of Father Time and replaced by a doppelganger. It was believed that Senator Knight wanted to run America as a dictatorship enforced by a metahuman army shown through visions created by Uncle Sam, but it appears that the real person who wants America this way is the individual running S.H.A.D.E. This figure, a cyborg named Gonzo the Mechanical Bastard, is impersonating Senator Knight.

In the second issue of Uncle Sam and the Freedom Fighters, Stormy becomes a Freedom Fighter. She reveals that she has a degree in quantum physics and pretends to be a spoiled idiot so she will not end up like other socialites. Her wrists bands appear to be able to transport Stormy and others from the third dimension to the fourth dimension.

In the second Uncle Sam and the Freedom Fighters series (September 2007), Stormy, still in shock over her father's death, begins to take drugs and drink heavily. After she drunkenly cuts a super-powered troublemaker in half on live television, Black Condor takes her to the extra-dimensional Heartland, where Uncle Sam tells her she will not leave until her habit has been kicked. Stormy later slits her wrists, but is found in time by Doll Man. Miss America removes all the toxins from her systems, allowing her to recuperate better.

By the end of the miniseries, Stormy decides to forgo her superhero career to pursue an acting vocation.

She was invited by Oracle to join the Birds of Prey, but ended up casually setting fire to her invitation immediately after reading it, stating that she was already on someone else's payroll.

=== Jennifer Knight ===
In 2012, DC Comics published a new ongoing comic book, Phantom Lady and Doll Man, featuring completely new versions of the characters, with no relation to their Freedom Fighter predecessors other than the character names. These were part of the "Second Wave" of its continuity reboot and entire-line relaunch, The New 52, which began in September 2011 following on from the Flashpoint limited series.

Several years ago, Jennifer Knight witnessed the murder of her parents on Christmas Eve. Her father had been one of the best reporters on the Daily Planet's crime beat, and was close to breaking the case against crime boss Robert Bender, until Bender found out. She swore to bring the Bender family down and in the present tries to enact this by infiltrating the inner circle of Cyrus and Eli Bender, the heirs to Robert Bender's crime legacy. Her cover is quickly discovered forcing Jennifer to seek help from her friend, Dane Maxwell, hoping to use his genius to hack Cyrus Bender's cellphone, but Cyrus' henchmen track them down and apparently kill Dane inside his own machine. Jennifer is later rescued by Dane, who had become miniaturized. He gives her a special suit and gloves enabling invisibility and shadow manipulation. She then chooses to become a vigilante, known as Phantom Lady.

In "The New Golden Age", Phantom Lady was mentioned by Mister Terrific to have been enlisted to take Human Bomb's sidekick Cherry Bomb and Red Bee's sidekick Ladybug under her wing so that she can hook them up with the Freedom Fighters as this is seen on one of the screens.

== Other versions and homages ==
=== DC Comics ===
==== Silk Spectre ====
The second Silk Spectre in Watchmen by Alan Moore is loosely based on Phantom Lady. Alan Moore had originally intended to use Charlton Comics characters in his mini-series (until DC told him otherwise), which would imply that Silk Spectre was based on Charlton's Nightshade. Moore found the Nightshade character boring, and based Silk Spectre on the Phantom Lady and DC's Black Canary instead.

==== Kingdom Come ====
A new Phantom Lady is shown in the Elseworlds comic Kingdom Come, who is described in the series' endnotes as a literal phantom (ghost) of the original version. Series co-creator Alex Ross used famed pin-up model Bettie Page as his model for this version of Phantom Lady.

==== 52 ====
An alternate universe version of Phantom Lady makes a minor appearance in 52. This version is from Earth-10, a universe similar to Earth-X.

==== New Super-Man ====
New Super-Man features a character named Ghost Woman (an analog of Phantom Lady).

=== Other publishers ===
==== Cobweb ====
Cobweb appeared in Tomorrow Stories, an anthology title in Alan Moore's America's Best Comics line. The character, created by Moore and Melinda Gebbe, was an eroticized homage to Phantom Lady. She is a rich society girl named Laurel Lakeland who battles crime out of sheer boredom with her chauffeur/lesbian partner, Clarice.

==== Blue Bulleteer ====
Femforce #38 (1991) AC Comics, the Blue Bulleteer, derived from Matt Baker's Phantom Lady

In May 1972, Bill Black's Paragon Publications began publishing its own revival of Phantom Lady with a four-page ashcan titled The Phantom Lady #1, on the belief that the character had lapsed into the public domain. While the announced standalone title was never released, the character continued in titles such as Fem Fantastique. Black's Phantom Lady was an even more undressed version of the Matt Baker character, and a mask and ordinary handgun were also added. When DC Comics threatened legal action, AC changed their version to "Nightveil", a supernaturally-themed character who was later made a member of Femforce, the first all-female superhero team; the Bill Black version of the Phantom Lady was retained as Nightveil's original superhero identity, under the name "Blue Bulleteer".

AC Comics, as well as other minor publishers such as Verotik, have nonetheless published reprints of the original Quality and Fox stories without any legal action from DC Comics. When Verotik published its reprints, it was AC Comics that sued for trademark infringement, not DC Comics. Many believe these early stories to have lapsed into the public domain because the original owners failed to renew the copyright before it expired (as was required under pre-1976 U.S. copyright law).

==== Shadow Lady ====
Shadow Lady is a character seen in Big Bang Comics, all of whose characters are parodies of DC Comics. Like Sandra Knight, Veronica Prescott is a wealthy debutante, whose father invented the "Shadow Ray Projector". Shadow Lady is not Veronica, however, but is actually a duplicate created by the projector. She has the power to become solid or intangible at will, and has her own Shadow Ray Projector she can use to blind villains. The character's costume, and the art style, are strongly based on Phantom Lady.

==== Savage Dragon ====
The Fox Features Syndicate version of the character made a minor appearance in Savage Dragon #141 as one of the many Golden Age characters who were released from Solar Man's prison. In the subsequent clash between Image Comics superheroes and Golden Age superheroes, Phantom Lady wound up fighting Witchblade until the misunderstanding between the two groups was resolved.

The Golden Age Phantom Lady made her return in Savage Dragon #199 as part of the Special Operations Strikeforce (S.O.S.) alongside her other Golden Age contemporaries, and many of Erik Larsen's original characters, where they battled subterranean demons invading the surface.

== In other media ==
=== Television ===
- The Stormy Knight incarnation of Phantom Lady appears in the Batman: The Brave and the Bold episode "Cry Freedom Fighters!", voiced by Hope Levy. This version uses technology to provide the powers of intangibility, invisibility, and self-duplication.
- An original Earth-X incarnation of Phantom Lady named Jenny Knight appears in Freedom Fighters: The Ray, voiced by Dilshad Vadsaria.

=== Miscellaneous ===
- The Stormy Knight incarnation of Phantom Lady appears in Justice League Unlimited #17.
- In 2025, fan film director Chris R. Notarile released two short films starring Lindsey Bean as the Sandra Knight incarnation. Bean also reprised the role in Notarile's 2026 film Ms. Fury.
