= Strange Fantasy (comic) =

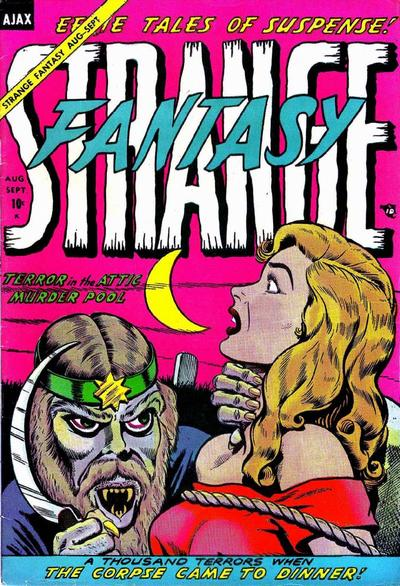
- Bondage cover, issue 13

Publication information
- Publisher: Ajax-Farrell
- Schedule: Bi-monthly
- Format: Anthology
- Publication date: October 1952 — October/November 1954
- No. of issues: 13

Creative team
- Written by: Bob Hamilton
- Artist(s): Steve Ditko

Strange Fantasy is a 36-page, 10 cent, bi-monthly, anthology horror comics title published by Ajax-Farrell in the early 1950s. Its initial issue cover dates October 1952 and its last issue October/November 1954, for a total of 13 issues.
