= Steve Ditko =

American comics artist (1927–2018)

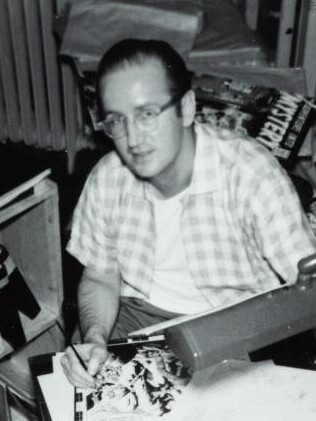
- Ditko in 1959
- Born: Stephen John Ditko; November 2, 1927 Johnstown, Pennsylvania, U.S.
- Died: c. June 29, 2018 (aged 90) New York City, U.S.
- Areas: Writer, Penciller, Inker
- Notable works: Spider-Man; Doctor Strange; Creeper; Hawk and Dove; Mr. A; Question; Captain Atom; Blue Beetle; Nightshade; Speedball
- Awards: Disney Legends (2024)

Stephen John Ditko (/ˈdɪtkoʊ/; November 2, 1927 – c. June 29, 2018) was an American comic book artist best known for being the co-creator of Marvel superheroes Spider-Man and Doctor Strange. He also made notable contributions to the character of Iron Man, introducing the character's signature red and yellow design.

Ditko studied under Batman artist Jerry Robinson at the Cartoonist and Illustrators School (now the School of Visual Arts) in New York City. He began his professional career in 1953, working in the studio of Joe Simon and Jack Kirby, beginning as an inker and coming under the influence of artist Mort Meskin. During this time, he began his long association with Charlton Comics, where he did work in the genres of science fiction, horror, and mystery. He also co-created the superhero Captain Atom in 1960.

During the 1950s, Ditko also drew for Atlas Comics, a forerunner of Marvel Comics. He went on to contribute much significant work to Marvel. Ditko was the artist for the first 38 issues of The Amazing Spider-Man, co-creating much of the Spider-Man supporting characters and villains with Stan Lee. Beginning with issue #25, Ditko was also credited as the plotter. In 1966, after being the exclusive artist on The Amazing Spider-Man and the "Doctor Strange" feature in Strange Tales, Ditko left Marvel.

He continued to work for Charlton and also DC Comics, including a revamp of the long-running character the Blue Beetle and creating or co-creating The Question, The Creeper, Shade, the Changing Man, Nightshade, and Hawk and Dove. Ditko also began contributing to small independent publishers, where he created Mr. A, a hero reflecting the influence of Ayn Rand's philosophy of Objectivism.

Throughout his career, Ditko largely declined to give interviews, saying that he preferred to communicate through his work; however, he did respond to fan mail, sending thousands of handwritten letters during his lifetime. He was inducted into the comics industry's Jack Kirby Hall of Fame in 1990 and into the Will Eisner Award Hall of Fame in 1994. In 2024, Ditko was named a Disney Legend for his contributions to Publishing.

== Early life ==
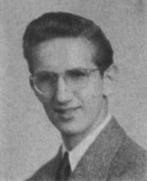
Ditko as a senior in high school, 1945

Stephen John Ditko was born on November 2, 1927, in Johnstown, Pennsylvania. His parents were second-generation Americans: children of Rusyn Byzantine Catholic immigrants from the former Austro-Hungarian Empire (now Slovakia). (Note: For parents' and grandparents' place of birth, see "United States Census, 1930", United States census, 1930; Johnstown, Cambria, Pennsylvania; roll 2012, page 7A, line 39–40, enumeration district 70, Family History film 2,41746, National Archives film number T626. Retrieved on 2021-10-29.; For Rusyn history of St. Mary's Byzantine Catholic Church see Custer, Richard D. (Summer 2016). "Old Countrymen, New Neighbors: Early Carpatho-Rusyn and Slovak Immigrant Relations in the United States". Slovo. National Czech & Slovak Museum & Library. p. 3. Archived (PDF) from the original on April 23, 2021.) His father, Stefan ("Stephen"), was an artistically talented master carpenter at a steel mill and his mother, Anna (Balaschak), was a homemaker. The second-oldest child in a working-class family, he was preceded by sister Anna Marie, and followed by sister Elizabeth and brother Patrick. Inspired by his father's love of newspaper comic strips, particularly Hal Foster's Prince Valiant, Ditko found his interest in comics accelerated by the introduction of the superhero Batman in 1939, and by Will Eisner's The Spirit, which appeared in a tabloid-sized comic-book insert in Sunday newspapers.

Ditko in junior high school was part of a group of students who crafted wooden models of German airplanes to aid civilian World War II aircraft-spotters. Upon graduating from Greater Johnstown High School in 1945, he enlisted in the U.S. Army on October 26, 1945, and did military service in Allied-occupied Germany, where he drew comics for an Army newspaper.

== Career ==
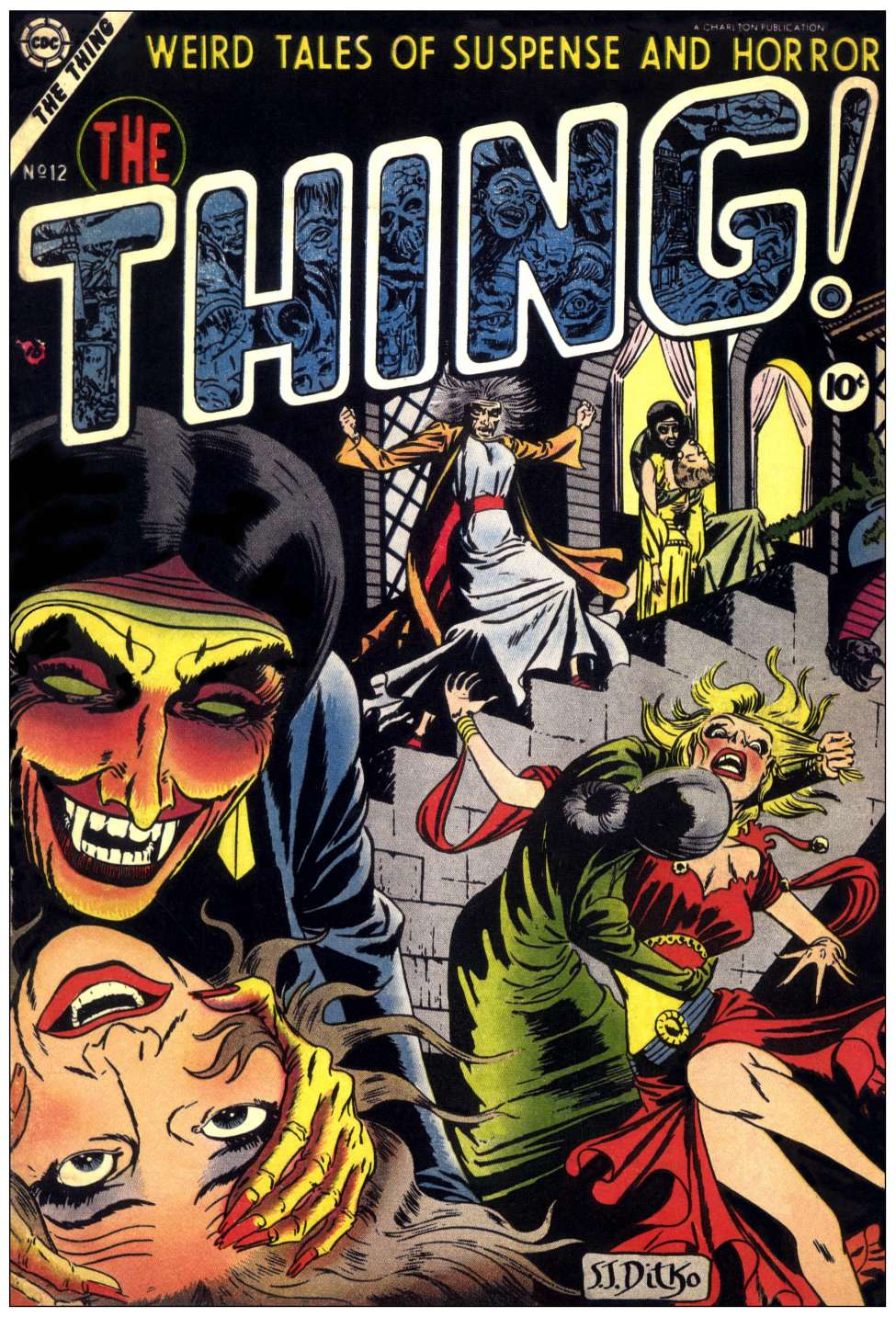
The Thing #12 (February 1954), Ditko's first published comic book cover

Following his discharge, Ditko learned that his idol, Batman artist Jerry Robinson, was teaching at the Cartoonists and Illustrators School (now the School of Visual Arts) in New York City. Moving there in 1950, he enrolled in the art school under the G.I. Bill. Robinson found the young student "a very hard worker who really focused on his drawing" and someone who "could work well with other writers as well as write his own stories and create his own characters", and he helped Ditko acquire a scholarship for the following year. "He was in my class for two years, four or five days a week, five hours a night. It was very intense." Robinson, who invited artists and editors to speak with his class, once brought in Stan Lee, then editor of Marvel Comics' 1950s precursor Atlas Comics and, "I think that was when Stan first saw Steve's work."

Ditko began professionally illustrating comic books in early 1953, drawing writer Bruce Hamilton's science-fiction story "Stretching Things" for the Key Publications imprint Stanmor Publications, which sold the story to Ajax/Farrell, where it finally found publication in Fantastic Fears #5 (cover-dated February 1954). Ditko's first published work was his second professional story, the six-page "Paper Romance" in Daring Love #1 (October 1953), published by the Key imprint Gillmor Magazines.

Shortly afterward, Ditko found work at the studio of writer-artists Joe Simon and Jack Kirby, who had created Captain America and other characters. Beginning as an inker on backgrounds, Ditko was soon working with and learning from Mort Meskin, an artist whose work he had long admired. "Meskin was fabulous," Ditko once recalled. "I couldn't believe the ease with which he drew: strong compositions, loose pencils, yet complete; detail without clutter. I loved his stuff". Ditko's known assistant work includes aiding inker Meskin on the Jack Kirby pencil work of Harvey Comics' Captain 3-D #1 (December 1953). For his own third published story, Ditko penciled and inked the six-page "A Hole in His Head" in Black Magic vol. 4, #3 (December 1953), published by Simon & Kirby's Crestwood Publications imprint Prize Comics.

Ditko then began a long association with the Derby, Connecticut, publisher Charlton Comics, a low-budget division of a company best known for song-lyric magazines. Beginning with the cover of The Thing! #12 (Feb. 1954) and the eight-page vampire story "Cinderella" in that issue, Ditko would continue to work intermittently for Charlton until the company's demise in 1986, producing science fiction, horror and mystery stories, as well as co-creating Captain Atom, with writer Joe Gill, in Space Adventures #33 (March 1960). Ditko was allowed a great deal of creative freedom at Charlton due to very little editorial interference. However, the Comics Code Authority was imposed on the comics industry in 1954 due to public concern over graphic violence and horror imagery in comic books, and would prevent Ditko from further developing as a horror artist. He first went on hiatus from the company, and comics altogether, in mid-1954, when he contracted tuberculosis and returned to his parents' home in Johnstown to recuperate.

=== Marvel Comics ===
After he recovered, Ditko had originally intended to return to Charlton, but Charlton's office had been flooded by Hurricane Diane and operations wouldn't resume until months later. Ditko instead moved back to New York City in late 1955 and began drawing for Atlas Comics, the 1950s precursor of Marvel Comics, beginning with the four-page "There'll Be Some Changes Made" in Journey into Mystery #33 (April 1956); this debut tale would be reprinted in Marvel's Curse of the Weird #4 (March 1994). In 1957, Atlas switched distributors to the American News Company, which shortly afterward lost a Justice Department lawsuit and discontinued its business, leading to Atlas's entire staff being laid off. Ditko returned to Charlton afterward and experimented with various drawing styles and genres in series such as Tales of the Mysterious Traveler and This Magazine Is Haunted.

During the summer of 1958, writer-editor Stan Lee invited Ditko back to Atlas. Ditko would go on to contribute a large number of stories, many considered classic, to Atlas/Marvel's Strange Tales and the newly launched Amazing Adventures, Strange Worlds, Tales of Suspense and Tales to Astonish, issues of which would typically open with a Kirby-drawn monster story, followed by one or two twist-ending thrillers or sci-fi tales drawn by Don Heck, Paul Reinman, or Joe Sinnott, all capped by an often-surreal, sometimes self-reflective short by Ditko and Stan Lee. The first collaboration between Ditko and Lee was 2-Gun Western #4 (May 1956), which was also Ditko's only non-fantasy story.

These Lee-Ditko short stories proved so popular that Amazing Adventures was reformatted to feature such stories exclusively beginning with issue #7 (Dec. 1961), when the comic was rechristened Amazing Adult Fantasy, a name intended to reflect its more "sophisticated" nature, as likewise the new tagline "The magazine that respects your intelligence". Lee in 2009 described these "short, five-page filler strips that Steve and I did together", originally "placed in any of our comics that had a few extra pages to fill", as "odd fantasy tales that I'd dream up with O. Henry-type endings." Giving an early example of what would later be known as the "Marvel Method" of writer-artist collaboration, Lee said, "All I had to do was give Steve a one-line description of the plot and he'd be off and running. He'd take those skeleton outlines I had given him and turn them into classic little works of art that ended up being far cooler than I had any right to expect."

==== Creation of Spider-Man ====
After Marvel Comics editor-in-chief Stan Lee obtained permission from publisher Martin Goodman to create a new "ordinary teen" superhero named "Spider-Man", Lee originally approached his leading artist, Jack Kirby. Kirby told Lee about his own 1950s character conception, variously called the Silver Spider and Spiderman, in which an orphaned boy finds a magic ring that gives him super powers. Comics historian Greg Theakston says Lee and Kirby "immediately sat down for a story conference" and Lee afterward directed Kirby to flesh out the character and draw some pages. "A day or two later", Kirby showed Lee the first six pages, and, as Lee recalled, "I hated the way he was doing it. Not that he did it badly — it just wasn't the character I wanted; it was too heroic".

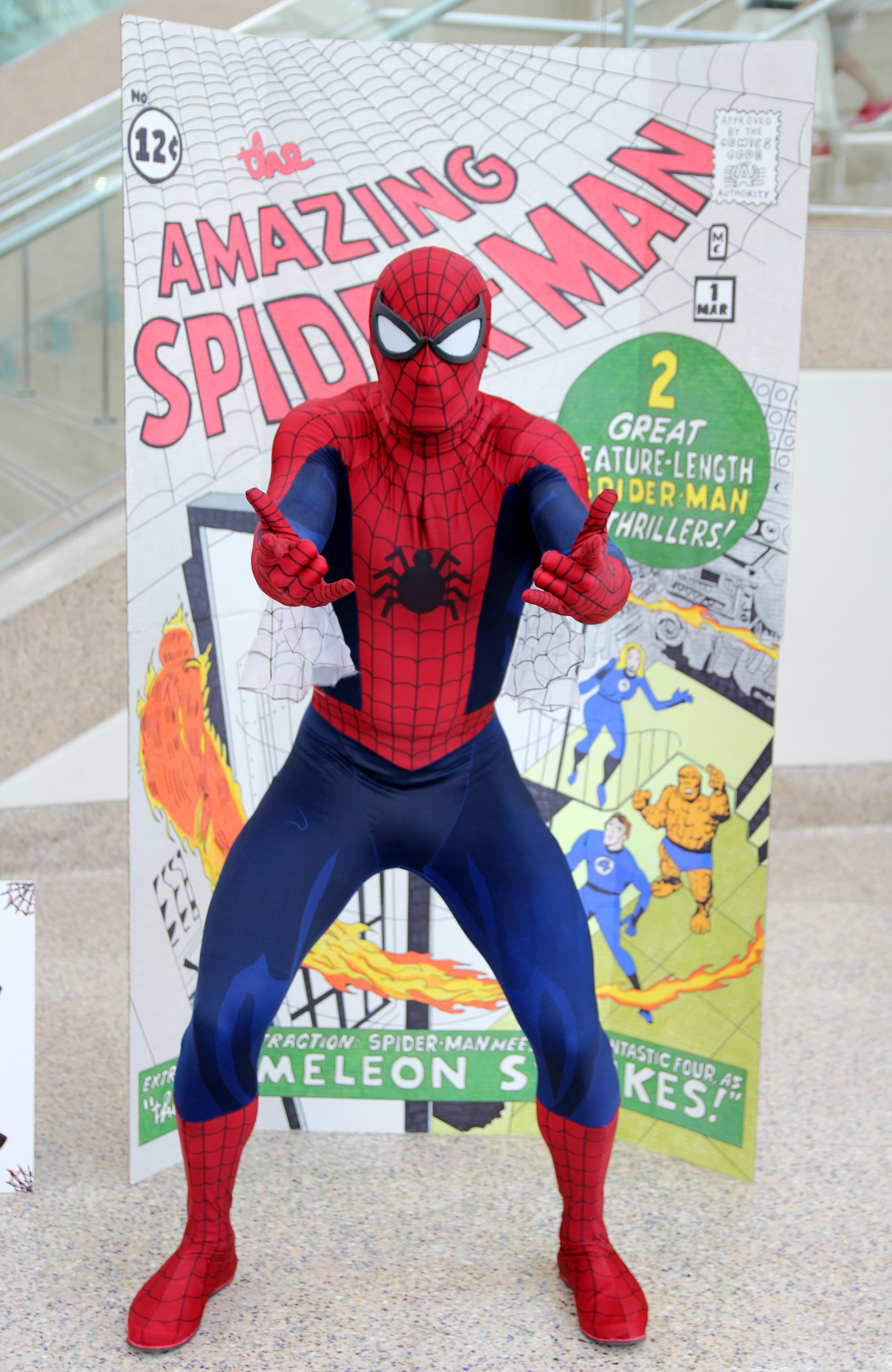
Fan dressed in Spider-Man costume after Ditko's design, posing in front of enlarged image of The Amazing Spider-Man #1 with Ditko cover art

Lee turned to Ditko, who developed a visual motif Lee found satisfactory, although Lee would later replace Ditko's original cover with one penciled by Kirby. Ditko said, "The Spider-Man pages Stan showed me were nothing like the (eventually) published character. In fact, the only drawings of Spider-Man were on the splash [i.e., page 1] and at the end [where] Kirby had the guy leaping at you with a web gun... Anyway, the first five pages took place in the home, and the kid finds a ring and turns into Spider-Man."

Ditko also recalled that, "One of the first things I did was to work up a costume. A vital, visual part of the character. I had to know how he looked ... before I did any breakdowns. For example: A clinging power so he wouldn't have hard shoes or boots, a hidden wrist-shooter versus a web gun and holster, etc. ... I wasn't sure Stan would like the idea of covering the character's face but I did it because it hid an obviously boyish face. It would also add mystery to the character...."

Much earlier, in a rare contemporaneous account, Ditko described his and Lee's contributions in a mail interview with Gary Martin published in Comic Fan #2 (Summer 1965): "Stan Lee thought the name up. I did costume, web gimmick on wrist & spider signal". He added he would continue drawing Spider-Man "[i]f nothing better comes along." That same year, he expressed to the fanzine Voice of Comicdom, regarding a poll of "Best Liked" fan-created comics, "It seems a shame, since comics themselves have so little variety of stories and styles that you would deliberately restrict your own creative efforts to professional comics['] shallow range. What is 'Best Liked' by most readers is what they are most familiar in seeing and any policy based on readers likes has to end up with a lot of look-a-like (sic) strips. You have a great opportunity to show everyone a whole new range of ideas, unlimited types of stories and styles—why FLUB it!"

From 1958 to 1968, Ditko shared a Manhattan studio at 43rd Street and Eighth Avenue with noted fetish artist Eric Stanton, an art-school classmate. When either artist was under deadline pressure, it was not uncommon for them to pitch in and help the other with his assignment. Ditko biographer Blake Bell, without citing sources, said, "At one time in history, Ditko denied ever touching Stanton's work, even though Stanton himself said they would each dabble in each other's art; mainly spot-inking", and the introduction to one book of Stanton's work says, "Eric Stanton drew his pictures in India ink, and they were then hand-coloured by Ditko". In a 1988 interview with Theakston, Stanton recalled that although his contribution to Spider-Man was "almost nil", he and Ditko had "worked on storyboards together and I added a few ideas. But the whole thing was created by Steve on his own... I think I added the business about the webs coming out of his hands".

Spider-Man debuted in Amazing Fantasy #15 (Aug. 1962), the final issue of that science-fiction/fantasy anthology series. When the issue proved to be a top seller, Spider-Man was given his own series, The Amazing Spider-Man. Lee and Ditko's collaboration on the series saw the creation of many of the character's best known antagonists including Doctor Octopus in issue #3 (July 1963); the Sandman in #4 (Sept. 1963); the Lizard in #6 (Nov. 1963); Electro in #9 (March 1964); and the Green Goblin in #14 (July 1964). Increasingly irritated by his perception that he was not receiving his due or proper compensation, Ditko demanded credit for the plotting he was contributing under the Marvel Method. Lee acquiesced, and starting with #25 (June 1965), Ditko received plot credit for the stories.

One of the most celebrated issues of the Lee-Ditko run is #33 (Feb. 1966), the third part of the story arc "If This Be My Destiny...!", and featuring the dramatic scene of Spider-Man, through force of will and thoughts of family, escaping from being pinned by heavy machinery. Comics historian Les Daniels noted, "Steve Ditko squeezes every ounce of anguish out of Spider-Man's predicament, complete with visions of the uncle he failed and the aunt he has sworn to save." Peter David observed, "After his origin, this two-page sequence from Amazing Spider-Man #33 is perhaps the best-loved sequence from the Stan Lee/Steve Ditko era." Steve Saffel stated the "full page Ditko image from The Amazing Spider-Man #33 is one of the most powerful ever to appear in the series and influenced writers and artists for many years to come." Matthew K. Manning wrote that "Ditko's illustrations for the first few pages of this Lee story included what would become one of the most iconic scenes in Spider-Man's history." The story was chosen as #15 in the 100 Greatest Marvels of All Time poll of Marvel's readers in 2001. Editor Robert Greenberger wrote in his introduction to the story, "These first five pages are a modern-day equivalent to Shakespeare as Parker's soliloquy sets the stage for his next action. And with dramatic pacing and storytelling, Ditko delivers one of the great sequences in all comics."

In this series, Ditko also had a lasting effect on Marvel's branding when he inserted a small box on the upper left-hand corner of issue #2 that featured a picture of Spider-Man's face along with the company name and price. Stan Lee approved of this visual motif and soon made it a standard feature on all of Marvel's subsequent comic books that would last for decades.

Two highly valued Spider-Man collectibles during Ditko's time on the series were mail-away items ordered through comic book ads. Ditko art was featured on a widely purchased t-shirt and on a 6' tall poster.

==== Doctor Strange and other characters ====
Dormammu attacks Eternity in a Ditko "Dr. Strange" panel from Strange Tales #146 (July 1966).

Ditko created the supernatural hero Doctor Strange in Strange Tales #110 (July 1963). Ditko in the 2000s told a visiting fan that Lee gave Dr. Strange the first name "Stephen".

Though often overshadowed by his Spider-Man work, Ditko's Doctor Strange artwork has been equally acclaimed for its surrealistic mystical landscapes and increasingly psychedelic visuals that helped make the feature a favorite of college students. "People who read 'Doctor Strange' thought people at Marvel must be heads [i.e. drug users]," recalled then-associate editor and former Doctor Strange writer Roy Thomas in 1971, "because they had had similar experiences high on mushrooms. But ... I don't use hallucinogens, nor do I think any artists do." Ditko, "always the most straight-laced man in comics", was deeply offended by the suggestion that he used psychedelic drugs to create the worlds of Dr. Strange.

Eventually Lee & Ditko would take Strange into ever-more-abstract realms. In an epic 17-issue story arc in Strange Tales #130–146 (March 1965 – July 1966), Lee and Ditko introduced the cosmic character Eternity, who personified the universe and was depicted as a silhouette whose outlines are filled with the cosmos. As historian Bradford W. Wright describes,

Steve Ditko contributed some of his most surrealistic work to the comic book and gave it a disorienting, hallucinogenic quality. Dr. Strange's adventures take place in bizarre worlds and twisting dimensions that resembled Salvador Dalí paintings. ... Inspired by the pulp-fiction magicians of Stan Lee's childhood as well as by contemporary Beat culture. Dr. Strange remarkably predicted the youth counterculture's fascination with Eastern mysticism and psychedelia. Never among Marvel's more popular or accessible characters, Dr. Strange still found a niche among an audience seeking a challenging alternative to more conventional superhero fare.

The cartoonist and fine artist Seth in 2003 described Ditko's style as:

...oddball for mainstream comics. Whereas Kirby's stuff clearly appealed to a boy's sensibility because there was so much raw power, Ditko's work was really delicate and cartoony. There was a sense of design to it. You can always recognize anything that Ditko designed because it's always flowery. There is a lot of embroidered detail in the art, which is almost psychedelic.

In addition to Dr. Strange, Ditko in the 1960s also drew comics starring the Hulk and Iron Man. He penciled and inked the final issue of The Incredible Hulk (#6, March 1963), then continued to collaborate with writer-editor Lee on a relaunched Hulk feature in the omnibus Tales to Astonish, beginning with issue #60 (Oct. 1964). Ditko, inked by George Roussos, penciled the feature through #67 (May 1965). Ditko designed the Hulk's primary antagonist, the Leader, in #63 (Jan. 1965).

Ditko also penciled the Iron Man feature in Tales of Suspense #47–49 (Nov. 1963 – Jan. 1964), with various inkers. The first of these debuted the initial version of Iron Man's modern red-and-golden armor.

Whichever feature he drew, Ditko's idiosyncratic, cleanly detailed, instantly recognizable art style, emphasizing mood and anxiety, found great favor with readers. The character of Spider-Man and his troubled personal life meshed well with Ditko's own interests, which Lee eventually acknowledged by giving the artist plotting credits on the latter part of their 38-issue run. But after four years on the title, Ditko left Marvel; he and Lee had not been on speaking terms for some time, with art and editorial changes handled through intermediaries. The details of the rift remain uncertain, even to Lee, who confessed in 2003, "I never really knew Steve on a personal level." Ditko later claimed it was Lee who broke off contact and disputed the long-held belief that the disagreement was over the true identity of the Green Goblin: "Stan never knew what he was getting in my Spider-Man stories and covers until after [production manager] Sol Brodsky took the material from me ... so there couldn't have been any disagreement or agreement, no exchanges ... no problems between us concerning the Green Goblin or anything else from before issue #25 to my final issues". Spider-Man successor artist John Romita, in a 2010 deposition, recalled that Lee and Ditko "ended up not being able to work together because they disagreed on almost everything, cultural, social, historically, everything, they disagreed on characters. ..." A friendly farewell was given to Ditko in the "Bullpen Bulletins" of comics cover-dated July 1966, including Fantastic Four #52: "Steve recently told us he was leaving for personal reasons. After all these years, we're sorry to see him go, and we wish the talented guy success with his future endeavors."

Regardless, said Lee in 2007, "Quite a few years ago I met him up at the Marvel offices when I was last in New York. And we spoke; he's a hell of a nice guy and it was very pleasant. ... I haven't heard from him since that meeting."

=== Charlton and DC Comics ===
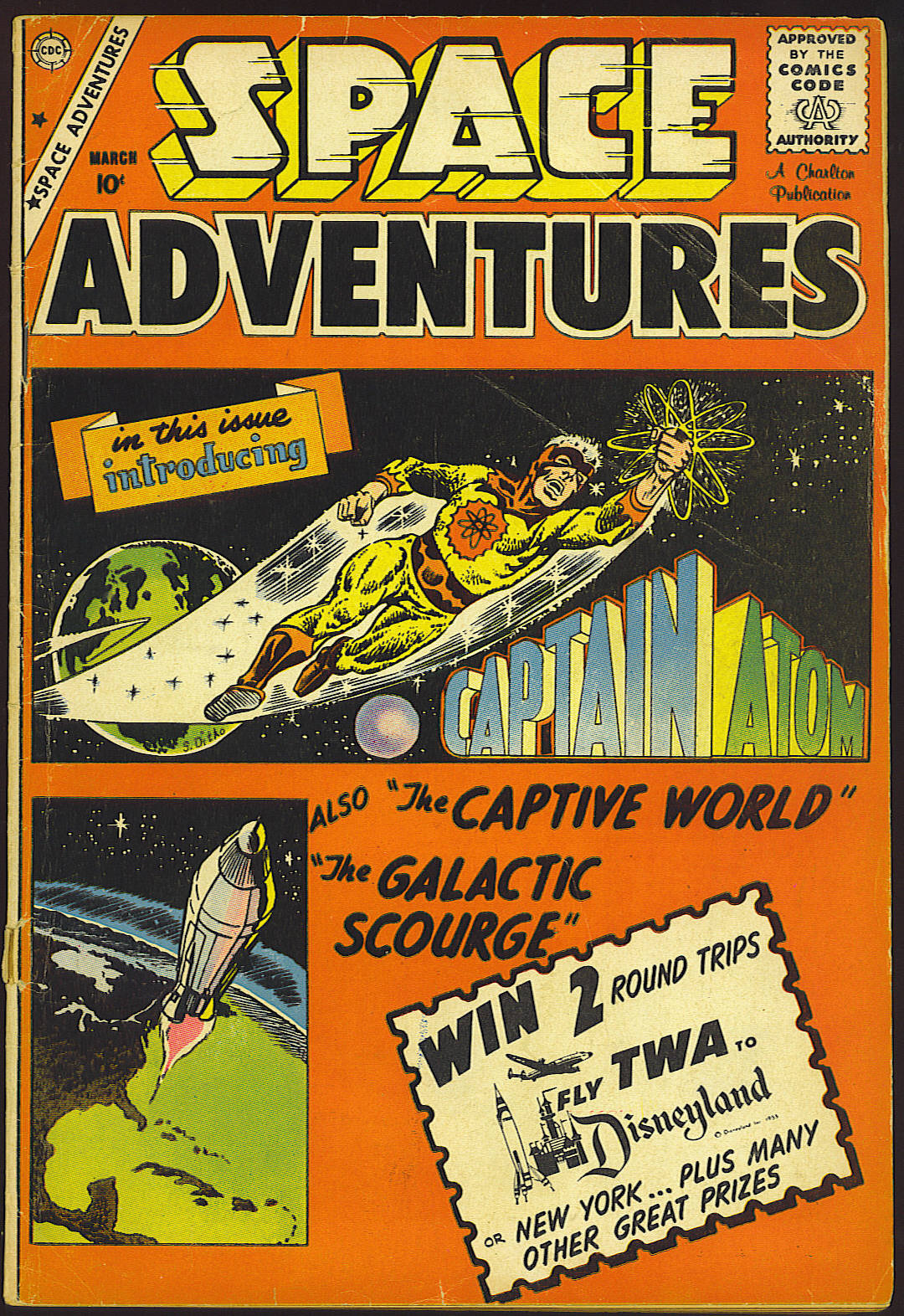
Debut of Captain Atom, Space Adventures #33 (March 1960)

Back at Charlton—where the page rate was low but creators were allowed greater freedom—Ditko worked on such characters as the Blue Beetle (1967–1968), the Question (1967–1968), and Captain Atom (1965–1967), returning to the character he had co-created in 1960. In addition, in 1966 and 1967, he drew 16 stories, most of them written by Archie Goodwin, for Warren Publishing's horror-comic magazines Creepy and Eerie, generally using an ink-wash technique.

In 1967, Ditko gave his Objectivist ideas ultimate expression in the form of Mr. A, published in Wally Wood's independent title witzend # 3, an underground anthology comic in black and white that avoided the Comics Code Authority by being published in magazine format and only being available by subscription, and whose editorial policy was to allow artistic freedom without any editorial interference. Mr. A is a similar character to the Question, but without being restricted by the Comics Code. Ditko's hard line against criminals was controversial and he continued to produce Mr. A stories and one-pagers until the end of the 1970s. Ditko returned to Mr. A in 2000 and in 2009.

A panoply of Ditko DC Comics characters, from a "DC Profiles" biographical page appearing in comics cover-dated April 1980, including Batman #322 and The Legion of Super-Heroes #262. From left: the Creeper; Hawk and Dove; Stalker; the Odd Man; Shade, the Changing Man; Starman.

Ditko moved to DC Comics in 1968, where he co-created the Creeper in Showcase #73 (April 1968) with Don Segall, under editor Murray Boltinoff. DC Comics writer and executive Paul Levitz observed that Ditko's art on the Creeper stories made "them look unlike anything else being published by DC at the time." Ditko co-created the team Hawk and Dove in Showcase #75 (June 1968), with writer Steve Skeates. Around this time, he penciled the lead story, written and inked by Wally Wood, in Wood's early mature-audience, independent-comics publication Heroes, Inc. Presents Cannon (1969).

Ditko's stay at DC was short—he would work on all six issues of the Creeper's own title, Beware the Creeper (June 1968 – April 1969), though leaving midway through the final one—and the reasons for his departure uncertain. But while at DC, Ditko recommended Charlton staffer Dick Giordano to the company, who would go on to become a top DC penciller, inker, editor, and ultimately, in 1981, the managing editor.

From this time up through the mid-1970s, Ditko worked exclusively for Charlton and various small press/independent publishers. Frank McLaughlin, Charlton's art director during this period, describes Ditko as living "in a local hotel in Derby for a while. He was a very happy-go-lucky guy with a great sense of humor at that time, and always supplied the [female] color separators with candy and other little gifts".

For Charlton, in 1974, he did Liberty Belle backup stories in E-Man and conceived Killjoy. Ditko produced much work for Charlton's science-fiction and horror titles, as well as for former Marvel publisher Martin Goodman's start-up line Atlas/Seaboard Comics, where he co-created the superhero the Destructor with writer Archie Goodwin, and penciled all four issues of the namesake series (Feb.–Aug. 1975), the first two of which were inked by Wally Wood. Ditko worked on the second and third issues of Tiger-Man and the third issue of Morlock 2001, with Bernie Wrightson inking.

=== After 1975 ===
Ditko returned to DC Comics in 1975, creating a short-lived title, Shade, the Changing Man (1977–1978). Shade was later revived, without Ditko's involvement, in DC's mature-audience imprint Vertigo. With writer Paul Levitz, he co-created the four-issue sword and sorcery series Stalker (1975–1976). Ditko and writer Gerry Conway produced the first issue of a two-issue Man-Bat series. He also revived the Creeper and did such various other jobs as a short Demon backup series in 1979, created The Odd Man and stories in DC's horror and science-fiction anthologies. Editor Jack C. Harris hired Ditko as guest artist on several issues of The Legion of Super-Heroes, a decision which garnered a mixed reaction from the title's readership. Ditko also drew the Prince Gavyn version of Starman in Adventure Comics #467–478 (1980). He then decamped to do work for a variety of publishers, briefly contributing to DC again in the mid-1980s, with four pinups of his characters for Who's Who: The Definitive Directory of the DC Universe and a pinup for Superman #400 (Oct. 1984) and its companion portfolio. Ditko returned to Marvel in 1979, taking over Jack Kirby's Machine Man, drawing The Micronauts and Captain Universe, and continuing to freelance for the company into the late 1990s. Starting in 1984, he penciled the last two years of the space-knight series Rom. A Godzilla story by Ditko and Marv Wolfman was changed into a Dragon Lord story published in Marvel Spotlight. Ditko and writer Tom DeFalco introduced the Speedball character in The Amazing Spider-Man Annual #22 (1988) and Ditko drew a ten-issue series based on the character.

In 1982, he also began freelancing for the early independent comics label Pacific Comics, beginning with Captain Victory and the Galactic Rangers #6 (Sept. 1982), in which he introduced the superhero Missing Man, with Mark Evanier scripting to Ditko's plot and art. Subsequent Missing Man stories appeared in Pacific Presents #1–3 (Oct. 1982 – March 1984), with Ditko scripting the former and collaborating with longtime friend Robin Snyder on the script for the latter two. Ditko also created The Mocker for Pacific, in Silver Star #2 (April 1983).

For Eclipse Comics, he contributed a story featuring his character Static (no relation to the later Milestone Comics character) in Eclipse Monthly #1–3 (Aug.–Oct. 1983), introducing supervillain the Exploder in #2. With writer Jack C. Harris, Ditko drew the backup feature "The Faceless Ones" in First Comics' Warp #2–4 (April–June 1983). Working with that same writer and others, Ditko drew a handful of the Fly, Flygirl and Jaguar stories for The Fly #2–8 (July 1983 – Aug. 1984), for Archie Comics' short-lived 1980s superhero line; in a rare latter-day instance of Ditko inking another artist, he inked penciler Dick Ayers on the Jaguar story in The Fly #9 (Oct. 1984). Western Publishing in 1982 announced a series by Ditko and Harris would appear in a new science-fiction comic, Astral Frontiers, but that title never materialized.

Ditko and Harris created 3-D Substance, a character with the power to turn invisible in a 3-D comic, in 1990. Substance also had the ability to project his voice away from himself, which Ditko demonstrated through the placement of word balloons. In the early 1990s Ditko worked for Jim Shooter's newly founded company Valiant Comics, drawing, among others, issues of Magnus, Robot Fighter, Solar, Man of the Atom and X-O-Manowar. In 1992 Ditko worked with writer Will Murray to produce one of his last original characters for Marvel Comics, the superheroine Squirrel Girl, who debuted in Marvel Super-Heroes vol. 2, #8, a.k.a. Marvel Super-Heroes Winter Special (Jan. 1992).

In 1992 he had a meeting with Stan Lee, who wanted to work with Ditko on a comic project about a "garbageman superhero from the future", but he declined because he didn't like the future portrayed in the concept. When Lee then suggested they should do a Spider-Man graphic novel together, he declined that too, claiming he no longer had the same feelings for the character that he once had.

In 1993, he did the Dark Horse Comics one-shot The Safest Place in the World. For the Defiant Comics series Dark Dominion, he drew issue #0, which was released as a set of trading cards. In 1995, he pencilled a four-issue series for Marvel based on the Phantom 2040 animated TV series. This included a poster that was inked by John Romita Sr. Steve Ditko's Strange Avenging Tales was announced as a quarterly series from Fantagraphics Books, although it only ran one issue (Feb. 1997) due to publicly unspecified disagreements between Ditko and the publisher.

The New York Times assessed in 2008 that, "By the '70s he was regarded as a slightly old-fashioned odd-ball; by the '80s he was a commercial has-been, picking up wretched work-for-hire gigs. ...following the example of [Ayn] Rand's John Galt, Ditko hacked out moneymaking work, saving his care for the crabbed Objectivist screeds he published with tiny presses. And boy, could Ditko hack: seeing samples of his Transformers coloring book and his Big Boy comic is like hearing Orson Welles sell frozen peas."

Ditko retired from mainstream comics in 1998. His later work for Marvel and DC included such established superheroes as the Sub-Mariner (in Marvel Comics Presents) and newer, licensed characters such as the Mighty Morphin Power Rangers. The last mainstream character he created was Marvel's Longarm in Shadows & Light #1 (Feb. 1998), in a self-inked, 12-page Iron Man story "A Man's Reach....", scripted by Len Wein. His final mainstream work was a five-page New Gods story for DC Comics, "Infinitely Gentle Infinitely Suffering", inked by Mick Gray and believed to be intended for the 2000–2002 Orion series but not published until the 2008 trade paperback Tales of the New Gods.

Thereafter, Ditko's solo work was published intermittently by Robin Snyder, who was his editor at Charlton, Archie Comics, and Renegade Press in the 1980s. The Snyder publications have included a number of original books as well as reprints such as Static, The Missing Man, The Mocker and, in 2002, Avenging World, a collection of stories and essays spanning 30 years.

In 2008, Ditko and Snyder released The Avenging Mind, a 32-page essay publication featuring several pages of new artwork; and Ditko, Etc..., a 32-page comic book composed of brief vignettes and editorial cartoons. Releases have continued in that format, with stories introducing such characters as the Hero, Miss Eerie, the Cape, the Madman, the Grey Negotiator, the !? and the Outline. He said in 2012 of his self-published efforts, "I do those because that's all they'll let me do".

In addition to the new material, Ditko and Snyder reprinted earlier Ditko material. In 2010 they published a new edition of the 1973 Mr. A comic and a selection of Ditko covers in The Cover Series. In 2011 they published a new edition of the 1975 comic ...Wha...!? Ditko's H. Series.

Two "lost" stories drawn by Ditko in 1978 have been published by DC in hardcover collections of the artist's work. A Creeper story scheduled for the never published Showcase #106 appears in The Creeper by Steve Ditko (2010) and an unpublished Shade, the Changing Man story appears in The Steve Ditko Omnibus Vol. 1 (2011). A Hulk and the Human Torch story written by Jack C. Harris and drawn by Ditko in the 1980s was published by Marvel as Incredible Hulk and the Human Torch: From the Marvel Vault #1 in August 2011.

== Personal life ==
As of 2012, Ditko continued to work in Manhattan's Midtown West neighborhood. He mostly declined to give interviews or make public appearances, explaining in 1969 that, "When I do a job, it's not my personality that I'm offering the readers but my artwork. It's not what I'm like that counts; it's what I did and how well it was done. I produce a product, a comic art story. Steve Ditko is the brand name." However, he did contribute numerous essays to Robin Snyder's fanzine The Comics.

As far as it is known, Ditko never married and had no surviving children at the time of his death. He had a nephew, also named Steve Ditko, who became an artist. Will Eisner stated that Ditko had a son out of wedlock; this may have been a confused reference to the nephew.

Politically, Ditko supported a "constitutional republic" and "inalienable individual and property rights". He supported neither George W. Bush nor John Kerry in the 2004 presidential election due to believing neither would prioritize those rights.

Ditko said in 2012 that he had made no income on the four Spider-Man films released to that time. However, a neighbor of Ditko stated that Ditko received royalty checks. Those involved with creating the 2016 film Doctor Strange purposely declined to contact him during production, believing they would not be welcome.

Ditko described himself as an atheist.

=== Objectivism ===
Ditko was an ardent supporter of Objectivism. The philosophy of Ayn Rand had "forever changed [Ditko's] outlook on morality, finances and his mission as a comic-book creator". After Ditko had received greater control of the plotting, he began revering the role of policemen in his Spider-Man work. Ditko had once told his Charlton co-worker Pete Morisi, a policeman who moonlighted as a comic book artist, that he envied Morisi for being able to arrest criminals. Randian philosophy had influenced Ditko to demand being credited and compensated as both the plotter and artist for Spider-Man beginning in issue #25, which Stan Lee (now credited as "scripter") allowed, though their working relationship would begin deteriorating. Other ways Ditko incorporated Randian views into Spider-Man were by having Peter Parker become more aggressive, demand better pay for his Spider-Man photos, and show contempt for student protestors. Marvel publisher Martin Goodman had been worried that Parker's "hard right-wing" politics would distance the character from most "left-leaning", countercultural university students, and disputes with Goodman over royalties had led to Ditko leaving Marvel. Ditko later expressed his Objectivist views even further with the Question, who criticized the apathy of the public toward right and wrong, and Mr. A, who refused to save villains from death.

He also described himself as an Aristotelian which his Objectivist views would align with.

== Death ==
Ditko was found unresponsive in his apartment in New York City on June 29, 2018. Police said he had died within the previous two days. He was pronounced dead at the age of 90, with the cause of death initially deemed as a result of a heart attack, brought on by arteriosclerotic and hypertensive cardiovascular disease.

The final words of Ditko's last essay, published posthumously in Down Memory Lane in February 2019, quoted an "old toast": "Here's to those who wish me well, and those that don't can go to hell."

In June 2021, Ditko's nephew Mark Ditko was interviewed and discussed his history with his uncle and his legacy, dispelling myths about him while also discussing his work with the Bottleworks Exhibition which houses a Steve Ditko Exhibition. He also shared rare photos among many other facts.

== Legacy ==
In 2021, Steve Ditko's younger brother Patrick, executor of his estate, in cooperation with the estates of artistic colleagues Don Heck, Gene Colan and Don Rico filed a lawsuit to terminate and reclaim the copyrights for their characters from Marvel Comics under the justification of the Copyright Act of 1976. Marvel countersued the litigants citing the same law since the creations were made under work for hire contracts, the company had full ownership. While the other participants settled in June 2023, the Ditko estate persisted until December 8, 2023. Although the settlements are confidential, Marvel's full ownership of the copyrights was secured for undisclosed sums to the creators.

In June 2022, a mural was completed in Ditko's hometown. Approved by Marvel Comics, and featuring his two most well-known characters (Spider-Man and Dr. Strange), the outline of the artwork was printed upon large white sheets of durable material. Community members painted upon the sheets during the winter and spring months, and then they were attached to a 28-foot tall wall.

Ditko was honored as a Disney Legend for his contributions to Marvel, and by extension the Walt Disney Company, at the 2024 D23 Expo.

== Artistic style ==
Ditko preferred to introduce characters before giving them a proper origin story (which he called "legends"), believing that a character should first be proven worthy of having their origins told. For example, Doctor Strange first appeared abruptly in Strange Tales #110 before his origin was revealed in issue #115, which Stan Lee attributed to the pair forgetting to tell but was in fact intentional.

== Awards and honors ==
- 1962 Alley Award for Best Short Story: "Origin of Spider-Man" by Stan Lee and Steve Ditko, Amazing Fantasy #15 (Marvel Comics).
- 1963 Alley Award for Best Adventure Hero Comic Book: The Amazing Spider-Man
- 1963 Alley Award for Top Hero: Spider-Man
- 1964 Alley Award for Best Adventure Hero Comic Book: The Amazing Spider-Man
- 1964 Alley Award for Best Giant Comic: The Amazing Spider-Man Annual #1
- 1964 Alley Award for Best Hero: Spider-Man
- 1965 Alley Award for Best Adventure Hero Comic Book: The Amazing Spider-Man
- 1965 Alley Award for Best Hero: Spider-Man
- 1985 Eagle Award: Roll of Honour
- In 1987, Ditko was presented a Comic-Con International Inkpot Award in absentia, accepted on his behalf by Renegade Press publisher Deni Loubert, who had published Ditko's World the previous year. Ditko refused the award, and returned it to Loubert after having phoned her to say, "Awards bleed the artist and make us compete against each other. They are the most horrible things in the world. How dare you accept this on my behalf". At his behest, Loubert returned the award to the convention organizers.
- 1991 UK Comic Art Award Career Achievement Award
- Ditko was inducted into the Jack Kirby Hall of Fame in 1990 and into the Will Eisner Award Hall of Fame in 1994.
- 2015 Inkwell Awards Joe Sinnott Hall of Fame Award

== BBC documentary ==
In September 2007, presenter Jonathan Ross hosted a one-hour documentary for BBC Four titled In Search of Steve Ditko. The program covers Ditko's work at Marvel, DC, and Charlton Comics and at Wally Wood's witzend, as well as his following of Objectivism. It includes testimonials by writers and artists Alan Moore, Mark Millar, Jerry Robinson and Stan Lee, among others. Ross, accompanied by writer Neil Gaiman, met Ditko briefly at his New York office, but he declined to be filmed, interviewed or photographed. He did, however, give the two a selection of some comic books. At the end of the show, Ross said he had since spoken to Ditko on the telephone and, as a joke, that he was now on first name terms with him.

== Bibliography ==
As penciler (generally but not exclusively self-inked), unless otherwise noted

Farrell Publications

- Strange Fantasy #2–14 (1952–1954)
- Fantastic Fears #5 (1954)

Harvey Comics

- Captain 3-D #1 (inks assist to Mort Meskin) (1953)

Key Publications

- Daring Love #1 (1953)
- Blazing Western #1 (1954)

Prize Comics

- Black Magic #27–29, 47 (1953–1961)

Charlton Comics

- The Thing! #12–15, 17 (1954)
- This Magazine is Haunted #16–19, 21 (1954)
- Crime and Justice #18 (1954)
- Racket Squad in Action #11–12 (1954)
- Strange Suspense Stories #18–22, 31–37, 39–41, 45, 47–48, 50–53 (1954–1961)
- Space Adventures #10–12, 24–27, 31–40, 42 (#33 debut Captain Atom) (1954–1961)
- From Here to Insanity #10 (1955)
- Tales of the Mysterious Traveler #2–11 (1957–1959)
- Out of this World #3–12, 16 (1957–1959)
- Cheyenne Kid #10 (1957)
- This Magazine is Haunted vol. 2 #12–14, 16 (1957–1958)
- From Here to Insanity vol. 3 #10 (1957)
- Mysteries of Unexplored Worlds #3–12, 19, 21–24, 26 (1957–1961)
- Texas Rangers in Action #8, 77 (1957–1970)
- Unusual Tales #6–12, 14–15, 22–23, 25–27, 29 (1957–1961)
- Fightin' Army #20, 89–90, 92 (1957–1970)
- Outer Space #18–21 (1958)
- Robin Hood and his Merry Men #38 (1958)
- Rocky Lane's Black Jack #24–28 (1958–1959)
- Black Fury #16–18 (1958–1959)
- Outlaws of the West #18, 80–81 (1959–1970)
- Gorgo #1–4, 11, 13–16, The Return of Gorgo #2–3 (1960–1964)
- Konga #1, 3–15, Konga's Revenge #2 (1960–1963)
- Space War #4–6, 8, 10 (1960–1961)
- Mad Monsters #1 (1961)
- Captain Atom #78–89 (1965–1967)
- Fantastic Giants #64 (1966)
- Shadows from Beyond #50 (1966)
- Ghostly Tales #55–58, 60–61, 67, 69–73, 75–90, 92–97, 99–123, 125–126 (1966–1977)
- The Many Ghosts of Doctor Graves #1, 7, 9, 11–13, 15–18, 20–22, 24, 26–35, 37–38, 40–43, 47–48, 51–56, 58, 60–62 (1967–1977)
- Blue Beetle #1–5 (1967–1968)
- Mysterious Suspense #1 (The Question) (1968)
- Outer Space vol. 2 #1 (1968)
- Strange Suspense Stories vol. 2 #2 (1968)
- Charlton Premiere #4 (1968)
- Time for Love #13 (1969)
- Space Adventures vol. 3 #2, 5–6, 8 (1968–1969)
- Jungle Jim #22, 27–28 (1969–1970)
- Ghost Manor #13–16, 18–19 (1970–1971)
- Phantom #36, 39 (1970)
- Romantic Story #107 (1970)
- Just Married #79 (1971)
- I Love You # 91 (1971)
- Haunted #1–8, 11–16, 18, 23–25, 28, 30 (1971–1976)
- Ghost Manor vol. 2 #1–18, 20–22, 24–26, 28–31, 37 (1971–1978)
- Ghostly Haunts #22–34, 36–40, 43–48, 50, 52, 54 (1972–1977)
- Haunted Love #4–5 (1973)
- E-Man #2, 4 (Killjoy), #5 (intro Liberty Belle II) (1973–1974)
- Midnight Tales #12 (1975)
- Scary Tales #3, 5, 7–8, 11–12, 14–15 (1975–1978)
- Beyond the Grave #1–6 (1975–1976)
- Monster Hunters #2, 4, 6, 8, 10 (1975–1977)
- Creepy Things #3, 5 (1975–1976)
- Doomsday + 1 #5 (1976)

Marvel Comics

- 2-Gun Western #4 (1956)
- Amazing Adventures #1–6 (1961); becomes

Amazing Adult Fantasy #7–14 (1961–1962); becomes

Amazing Fantasy #15 (debut Spider-Man) (1962)

- Amazing Spider-Man #1–38, Annual #1–2 (1963–1966)
- Amazing Spider-Man Annual #22 (debut Speedball), #24–25 (1988–1991)
- Astonishing #53 (1956)
- Avengers Annual #13, 15 (1984–1986)
- Battle #63, 68, 70 (1958–1960)
- Chuck Norris: Karate Kommandos 1–3 (1987)
- Crazy Magazine #68 (1980)
- Daredevil #162, 234–235, 264 (1980–1989)
- Destroyer, The #4 (1990)
- Destroyer, The vol. 2 #1 (1991)
- The Fantastic Four #13 (inking Jack Kirby) (1963)
- Fantastic Four Annual #16 (1981)
- Gunsmoke Western #56, 66 (1960–1961)
- Heroes & Legends #1 (1997)
- The Incredible Hulk #2 (inking Jack Kirby), #6 (1962–1963)
- The Incredible Hulk #249, Annual #9 (1980)
- Incredible Hulk and the Human Torch: From the Marvel Vault #1 (story created in the 1980s) (2011)
- The Further Adventures of Indiana Jones #21, 25–28, 32–34 (1984–1986)
- Iron Man #160 (1982)
- Iron Man Annual #11 (1990)
- Journey into Mystery #33, 38, 50–96 (1956–1963)
- Machine Man #10–19 (1979–1981)
- Journey Into Unknown Worlds #45, 51 (1956)
- Marvel Age Annual #4 (Speedball) (1988)
- Marvel Comics Presents #7, 10, 14, 54, 56, 58, 80–81, 83 (1988–1991)
- Marvel Legacy Doctor Strange #381
- Marvel Preview #21 (Shroud) (1980)
- Marvel Spotlight vol. 2 #4 (Captain Marvel), #5 (Dragon Lord), #9–11 (Captain Universe) (1980–1981)
- Marvel Super-Heroes vol. 2 #1–3, #5–8 (#8 debut Squirrel Girl) (1990–1992)
- Marvel Tales #147 (1956)
- Marvel Team-Up #101 (1981)
- Micronauts #39, Annual #1–2 (1979–1982)
- Mighty Morphin Power Rangers #2, 4 (1995–1996)
- Mighty Morphin Power Rangers: Ninja Rangers/VR Troopers #4–5 (1996)
- Mystery Tales #40, 45, 47 (1956)
- Phantom 2040 #1–4 (1995)
- Speedball #1–10 (1988–1989)
- Rom Spaceknight #59–75, Annual #4 (1984–1986)
- Spellbound #29 (1956)
- Sgt. Fury and his Howling Commandos #15 (inking Dick Ayers) (1965)
- Strange Tales #46, 50, 67–146 (Doctor Strange in #110–111, 114–146), Annual #2 (inking Jack Kirby) (1956–1966)
- Shadows & Light #1 (Iron Man) (1998)
- Strange Tales of the Unusual #5 (1956)
- Strange Worlds #1–5 (1958–1959)
- Tales to Astonish #1–48, 60–67 (The Hulk in #60–67, Giant Man in #61) (1959–1965)
- Tales of Suspense #1–49 (Iron Man in #47–49) (1959–1964)
- Tomb of Dracula magazine #2 (1979)
- Tower of Shadows #6, 8–9 (1970–1971)
- U.S.1 #12 (1984)
- Web of Spider-Man Annual #5 (Captain Universe) (1989)
- What If? #35 (Tigra) (1982)
- What If Special #1 (Iron Man) (1988)
- What The--?! #1 (1988)
- World of Fantasy #16–19 (1959)
- World of Mystery #3, 6 (1956–1957)

St. John Publications

- Do You Believe in Nightmares #1 (1957)

DC Comics

- Strange Adventures #188–189 (1966)
- Showcase #73 (debut, the Creeper) #75 (debut, The Hawk and the Dove) (1968)
- Beware the Creeper #1–6 (1968–1969)
- The Hawk and the Dove #1–2 (1968)
- Stalker #1–4 (1975–1976)
- House of Mystery #236, 247 (1975–1976)
- 1st Issue Special #7 (Creeper) (1975)
- Man-Bat #1 (1975)
- Plop! #16 (1975)
- House of Secrets #139 (1976)
- Weird War Tales #46, 49, 95, 99, 104–106 (1976–1981)
- Amazing World of DC Comics #13 (1976)
- Shade, the Changing Man #1–8 (1977–1978)
- Secrets of Haunted House #9, 12, 41, 45 (1977–1982)
- DC Special Series #9: Wonder Woman Spectacular (1978)
- World's Finest Comics #249–255 (Creeper) (1978–1979)
- Cancelled Comic Cavalcade #2 (two stories planned for Shade, the Changing Man #9) (1978)
- Ghosts #77, 111 (1979–1982)
- Time Warp #1–4 (1979–1980)
- Detective Comics #483–485 (The Demon), #487 (Odd Man debut, revised story, originally planned for Shade, the Changing Man #9) (1979)
- Superboy and the Legion of Superheroes #257 (1979)
- Unexpected #189–190, 221 (1979–1982)
- Legion of Super-Heroes vol. 2 #267, 268, 272, 274, 276, 281 (1980–1981)
- Adventure Comics #467–478 (Starman) (1980)
- Mystery in Space #111, 114–16 (1980–1981)
- The Outsiders #13 (1986)
- Who's Who: The Definitive Directory of the DC Universe #19–22 (1986)
- Action Comics Weekly #642 (among other artists) (1989)
- Legends of the DC Universe 80-Page Giant #1 (1998)
- Tales of the New Gods TPB (story originally planned for the Orion series) (2008)
- The Creeper by Steve Ditko HC (includes 25-page Creeper story originally planned for Showcase #106) (2010)
- The Steve Ditko Omnibus Vol. 1 HC (includes story originally planned for Shade, the Changing Man #9) (2011)

ACG

- Adventures into the Unknown #168 (1966)
- Forbidden Worlds #137–138, 140 (1966)
- Unknown Worlds #49–50, 54 (1966–1967)

Dell Publishing

- Nukla #4 (1966)
- Get Smart #2–3 (1966)
- Hogan's Heroes #3 (1966)

Warren Publishing

- Eerie #3–10 (1966–1967)
- Creepy #9–16 (1966–1967)

Tower Comics

- T.H.U.N.D.E.R. Agents #6–7, 12, 14, 16, 18 (1966–1968)
- Dynamo #1, 4 (1966–1967)

Independent

- Witzend #3, 4, 6, 7 (Wallace Wood) (1967–1969)
- Heroes, Inc. #1 (Wallace Wood) (1969)
- Mr. A. (Comic Art Publishers) (1973)
- Avenging World (Bruce Hershenson) (1973) (Note that the 2002 Avenging World is a collection of Ditko works including the 1973 comic)
- ...Wha..!? (Bruce Hershenson) (1975)
- Mr. A. (Bruce Hershenson) (1975)

Atlas/Seaboard

- The Destructor #1–4 (1975)
- Morlock 2001 #3 (1975)
- Tiger-Man #2–3 (1975)

CPL Gang

- Charlton Bullseye #1–2 (1975)

Star*Reach Productions

- Imagine #4 (1978)

M W Communications

- Questar #1–5 (1978–1979)

Pacific Comics

- Captain Victory and the Galactic Rangers #6 (Missing Man) (1981)
- Pacific Presents #1–3 (Missing Man) (1982–1984)
- Silver Star #2 (The Mocker) (1983)

New Media Publishing

- Fantasy Illustrated #1 (1982)

First Comics

- Warp #2–4 (1983)

Eclipse Comics

- Eclipse Monthly #1–3 (Static) (1983)

Epic Comics

- Coyote #7–10 (The Djinn) (1984–1985)

Archie Comics

- The Fly #2–4, #5–8, #9 (inking Dick Ayers) (1983–1986)
- Blue Ribbon Comics #12 (1984)

Deluxe Comics

- Wally Wood's T.H.U.N.D.E.R. Agents #3–4 (1985–1986)

Renegade Press

- Revolver #1–5, Annual Frisky Frolics #1 (1985–1986)
- Ditko's World featuring...Static #1–3 (1986)
- Murder #1–3 (1986)

Globe Communications

- Cracked #218–223, 225–227, 231 (1986–1987)
- Monsters Attack #1–5 (1989–1990)
- Cracked Collector's Edition #86 (1991)

Ace Comics

- What Is...the Face? #1–3 (1986–1987)
- Return of the Skyman #1 (1987)

3-D- Zone

- 3-D Substance #1–2 (1990)

Valiant Comics

- World Wrestling Federation: Lifestyles of the Brutal and Infamous (1991)
- World Wrestling Federation: Out-of-the-Ring Challenges (1991)
- World Wrestling Federation: When I Get My Hands... (1991)
- WWF Battlemania #5 (1991)
- X-O-Manowar #6 (1992)
- Shadowman #6 (1992)
- Solar, Man of the Atom #14–15 (1992)
- Magnus, Robot Fighter #18–19 (1992)

Marvel UK

- Tiny Toon Adventures #4 (1992)

Dark Horse Comics

- The Safest Place... (1993)

Defiant Comics

- Dark Dominion #0 (1993)

Topps Comics

- Captain Glory #1 (1993)
- Satan's Six #1 (inking Batton Lash) (1993)
- Jack Kirby's Secret City Saga #1–4 (1993)

Yoe! Studio

- Big Boy Magazine #470 (promo) (1997)

Fantagraphics Books

- Steve Ditko's Strange Avenging Tales #1 (1997)

AC Comics

- AC Retro Comics #5 (1998)

Robin Snyder

- Ditko Package (1989)
- The Mocker (1990)
- Ditko Public Service Package (1991)
- The Ditko Package series:

Steve Ditko's 160-Page Package (1999)
Steve Ditko's 80-Page Package: The Missing Man (1999)
Steve Ditko's 160-Page Package: From Charlton Press (1999)
Steve Ditko's 176-Page Package: Heroes (2000)
Steve Ditko's 32-Page Package: Tsk! Tsk! (2000)

- Steve Ditko's Static: Chapters 1 to 14 plus... (2000)
- Avenging World (2002) (240-page expanded version of 1973 edition)
- Mr. A. (2010) (Revised and reformatted reprint of the 1973 edition)
- Mr. A. #15 (2014) (Contains two stories originally intended for the first issue of a Mr. A. series solicited but unpublished by AAA c. 1990)
- The Four-Page Series (essays) #1–9 (2012–2015)
- The 32-page Series:

The Avenging Mind (2008)
Ditko, etc... (2008)
Ditko Continued... (2008)
Oh, No! Not Again, Ditko (2009)
Ditko Once More (2009)
Ditko Presents (2009)
A Ditko Act Two (2010)
A Ditko Act 3 (2010)
Act 4 (2010)
Act 5 (2010)
Act 6 (2011)
Act 7, Seven, Making 12 (2011)
Act 8, Making Lucky 13 (2011)
A Ditko #14 (2011)
A Ditko #15 (2011)
#16: Sixteen (2012)
#17: Seventeen (2012)
Ate Tea N: 18 (2013)
#9 Teen (2014)
#20 (2014)
#2oww1 (2014)
#22 (2015)
#23 (2015)
#24 (2016)
#25 (2016)
#26 (2018)
Down Memory Lane (2019)

- The 32 Series by Ditko: (each collecting 5–6 issues from the 32-page series)

Vol. I: Overture (2019) collecting 5 issues: Avenging Mind through Ditko Once More
Vol. II: Opening Acts (2019) collecting 5 issues: Ditko Presents through Act 5
Vol. III: Character Twists (2019) collecting 5 issues: Act 6 through A Ditko #15
Vol. IV: Postshadowing (2019) collecting 6 issues: #16: Sixteen through #2oww1
Vol. V: Curtain (2019) collecting 6 issues: #22 through Down Memory Lane

== Sources ==
- Bell, Blake (2008). Strange and Stranger: The World of Steve Ditko. Seattle, Washington: Fantagraphics. ISBN 978-1-56097-921-0.
- Harris, Jack C. (2023). Working With Ditko. Raleigh, North Carolina: TwoMorrows Publishing. ISBN 978-1-60549-122-6.
