= Farrell Publications =

Defunct comic book publisher

- Parent company: Elliot Publishing Company (1940–1945); Excellent Publications (1951–c. 1954); Dearfield Publishing (1955–1958)
- Founded: 1940
- Founder: Robert W. Farrell
- Defunct: 1958
- Country of origin: United States
- Headquarters location: New York City
- Key people: Robert W. Farrell, Jerry Iger
- Publication types: Comic books
- Fiction genres: Horror, romance, Western, adventure, superhero, funny animals
- Imprints: Ajax; America's Best; Decker Publications; Four Star Publications; Red Top Comics

Farrell Publications was a series of American comic book publishing companies founded and operated by Robert W. Farrell in the 1940s and 1950s, including Elliot Publishing Company, Farrell Comic Group, and Excellent Publications. Farrell is particularly known for its pre-Comics Code horror comics, mostly produced by the S. M. Iger Studio. Farrell also published romance, Western, adventure, superhero, and talking animal comics. Farrell acted as editor throughout. In addition to packaging art for Farrell from the beginning, Jerry Iger was the company's art director from 1955–1957.

== History ==
=== Farrell Publications ===
Farrell began Farrell Publications in 1940, operating until 1948. From 1940–1945, he was co-owner of the Elliot Publishing Company, (known for their imprint Gilberton, which became independent during that period). Some of Farrell's imprints and brands from this era were American Feature Syndicate, Four Star Publications, and Kiddie Kapers Company. Probably the most notable title produced during this period was Captain Flight Comics, published under the Four Star brand.

=== Farrell Comic Group ===
After a short hiatus, Farrell founded the Farrell Comic Group in 1951 with the financial backing of Excellent Publications. Imprints included America's Best, Ajax Publications, Ajax-Farrell, Decker Publications, Red Top Comics, Steinway Comics, and World Famous. No matter the imprint, most titles had the words "A Farrell Publication."

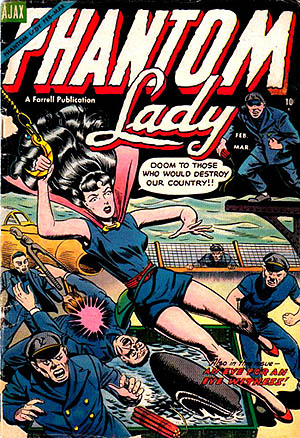
Phantom Lady vol. 2, #2 (Feb./March 1955) Ajax-Farrell Publications.

Contributors to Farrell titles from this period included Ken Battefield, L. B. Cole (who had previously contributed covers to Captain Flight), Matt Baker, Bruce Hamilton, and Steve Ditko. (The company published Ditko's first professional comics work. He had illustrated writer Bruce Hamilton's science fiction story "Stretching Things" for the Key Publications imprint Stanmor Publications, which sold the story to Farrell, where it finally found publication in Fantastic Fears #5 [Feb. 1954].)

Farrell's horror line consisted of Fantastic Fears, Haunted Thrills, Strange Fantasy, and Voodoo. All four books were produced by the Iger Studio and featured a consistent "house style." Like many horror comics, all four titles fell victim of the Senate Subcommittee on Juvenile Delinquency and were cancelled by the end of 1954.

In 1954 Farrell acquired the rights to the Phantom Lady comic strip series, previously owned by Fox Feature Syndicate and before that, Quality Comics. Farrell published four issues of the short-lived title from January to June 1954. The company also published Phantom Lady backup stories in two issues of its comic Wonder Boy. Phantom Lady as well fell under the baleful gaze of anti-comics crusader Fredric Wertham, who objected to the character's titillating costume. Changes were consequently made so that her cleavage was covered and shorts replaced her skirt.

After the cancellation of its popular horror titles in early 1955, Farrell received a cash infusion from Dearfield Publishing, which became a key investor. The company switched focus to romance, Western, and talking animal comics. In 1957, Farrell and former Iger studio-mate Myron Fass attempted to re-enter the horror/fantasy field with a quartet of Comics Code-approved titles made up of pre-Code material with the goriest panels excised. This resulted in incoherent stories and flat sales.

The company continued publishing until 1958, but never with the same success.

== Titles include ==
- All True Romance (13 issues, 1955–1958) — acquired from Comic Media; Ajax imprint
- Bride's Secrets (19 issues, 1954–1958) — Ajax imprint
- Captain Flight Comics (11 issues, 1944–1947) — Four Star Publications imprint
- Fantastic Fears (9 issues, 1953–1954) — Farrell/Ajax imprint
- Haunted Thrills (18 issues, 1952–1954) — Farrell/Ajax imprint
- The Lone Rider (26 issues, 1951 - 1955) — Farrell/Ajax imprint
- Phantom Lady (4 issues, 1954–1955) — originally published by Quality Comics, Fox Features Syndicate, and Star Publications; Ajax imprint
- Samson (3 issues, 1955) — originally published by Fox Features Syndicate; Ajax imprint
- Strange Fantasy (13 issues, 1952–1954) — Farrell/Ajax imprint
- Voodoo (19 issues, 1952–1955) — Farrell/Ajax imprint
- Wonder Boy (2 issues, 1955) — originally published by Quality Comics; Ajax imprint
