= Key Publications =

American comic book company

- Status: defunct 1956
- Founded: 1951
- Founder: Stanley P. Morse
- Country of origin: United States of America
- Headquarters location: New York City, New York
- Publication types: Comic books
- Fiction genres: Adventure, Crime, Horror, Mystery, Romance, Science Fiction, Teen Humor, War, Western
- Imprints: Aragon Magazines; Gillmor Magazines; Medal Comics; Media Publications; S. P. M. Publications; Stanmor Publications; Timor Publications

Key Publications was an American comic-book company founded by Stanley P. Morse that published under the imprints Aragon Magazines, Gillmor Magazines, Medal Comics, Media Publications, S. P. M. Publications, Stanmor Publications, and Timor Publications.

== History ==
Stanley P. Morse's Key Publications, based variously at 1775 Broadway, 280 Madison Avenue, 175 Fifth Avenue, and 261 Fifth Avenue in New York City, New York, published comic books from 1951 to 1956. The first, an action-adventure series starring the titular Mister Universe published under the Media Publications imprint, ran for only five issues cover-dated from July 1951 to February 1952, while the second, a horror anthology titled Mister Mystery, ran 19 issues cover-dated September 1951 to October 1954, and featured much early work by the art team of Ross Andru and Mike Esposito.

Artist Steve Ditko, the future co-creator of Spider-Man, began his professional comics career at Key in early 1953, illustrating writer Bruce Hamilton's science-fiction story "Stretching Things" for Key's Stanmor Publications, which sold the story to Ajax/Farrell, where it finally found publication in Fantastic Fears #5 (Feb. 1954). Ditko's first published work was his second professional story, the six-page "Paper Romance" in Daring Love #1 (Oct. 1953), published by Key's Gillmor Magazines.

Historian Lawrence Watt-Evans wrote of Morse:

His titles often changed publishers from one issue to the next as he dodged creditors or changed partners, and would sometimes have cover art taken from a story from a different issue as deadlines were missed. If he came up a story short, he would simply reprint something. If he couldn't get an artist for a particular slot, he'd have his editor cut up and rearrange the art from an old story to make a new one.

During the 1950s boom in horror comics, Morse "produced several acutely vile horror comics", wrote one historian, and "some of the grossest and most vile" of the time, concurred another. Interviewed for a 2008 book on 1950s horror comics, Morse said, "You did what you had to do — what moved 'em off the racks. ... I don't know what the hell I published. I never knew. I never read the things. I never cared." At their peak in 1955, Morse's combined imprints published 56 comics across 18 titles, more than contemporary publishers such as Ace Magazines, Ajax-Farrell, EC Comics, Magazine Enterprises, or Prize Comics.

== Titles by imprint ==
=== Aragon ===
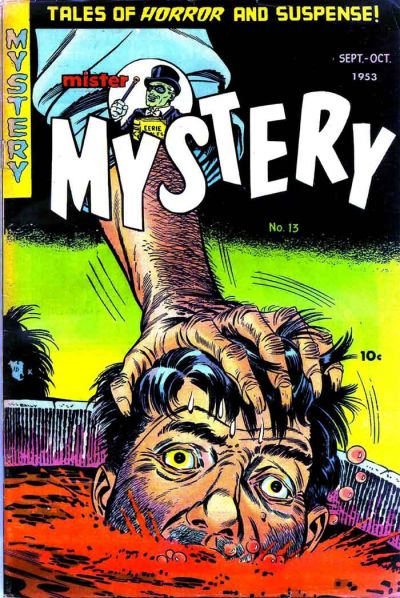
Mister Mystery #13, (September–October 1953), art by Bernard Baily.

- Battle Fire #1–4, #6 (April 1955 – May 1956; no issue #5)
- Mister Mystery #7–19 (September 1952–October 1954); continued from Media Publications
- Mutiny #1–3 (October 1954 – February 1955)
- Navy Task Force #1–6, #8 (December 1954 – April 1956; no issue #7)
- Weird Tales of the Future #5–6 (January 1953–March 1953); continued from S.P.M.

=== Gillmor ===
- Action Adventure Comics #2–4 (June–Oct. 1955)
- Climax #1–2 (July–Sept. 1955)
- Daring Love #1 (Oct. 1953) / Radiant Love #2–6 (Dec. 1953 – Aug. 1954)
- Real Adventure Comics #1 (April 1955)
- Super Fun #1 (Jan. 1956)
- Weird Mysteries #1–12 (Oct. 1952 – Sept. 1954)
- Western Rough Riders #1–4 (Nov. 1954 – May 1955)

=== Key Publications / Medal Comics ===
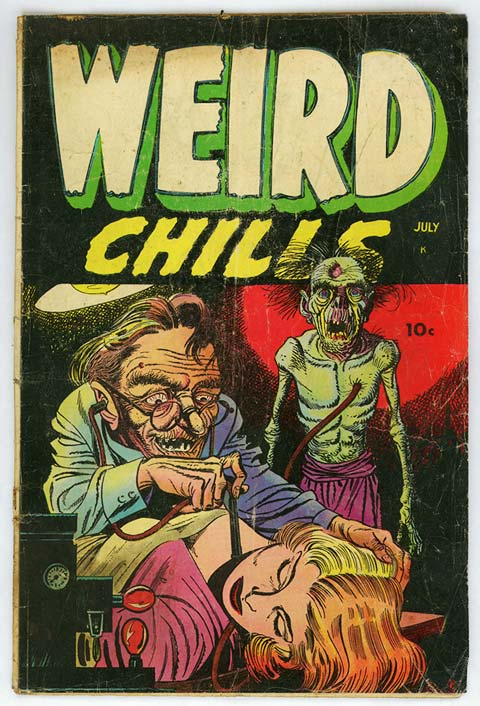
Weird Chills #1, (July 1954), art by Bernard Baily.

The "Medal Comics" imprint appears on the covers of Diary Confessions #14, Navy Patrol #4, and Flying Aces #3 & #5.

- Diary Confession #9–12, #14 (May 1955–April 1956; no #13); continued from Ideal Romance
- Flying Aces #1–3, #5 (July 1955–May 1956; no #4)
- Hector Comics #1–3 (November 1953–March 1954)
- Ideal Romance #3–8 (April 1954 – February 1955); continued from Tender Romance, see Diary Confessions
- Navy Patrol #1–4 (May 1955–November 1955)
- Peter Cottontail #1–2 (January 1954–March 1954)
- Peter Cottontail Three Dimensional Comics #1 (February 1954)
- Prize Mystery #1–3 (May 1955–September 1955)
- Silver Kid Western #1–5 (October 1954–July 1955)
- Tender Romance #1–2 (December 1953–February 1954); see Ideal Romance
- Warpath #1–3 (November 1954 – April 1955)
- Weird Chills #1–3 (July 1954–November 1954)

=== Media ===
- Mister Mystery #1–6 (September 1951–July 1952); see Aragon
- Mister Universe #1–5 (July 1951–April 1952)

=== S. P. M ===
- Junior Hopp Comics #1–3 (Jan.–July 1952)
- Weird Tales of the Future #1–4 (March 1952–November 1952); continued under Aragon

=== Stanmor ===
- Battle Attack #1–8 (Oct. 1954 – Dec. 1955)
- Battle Cry #1–20 (May 1952 – Sept. 1955)
- Battle Squadron #1–5 (April 1955 – Dec. 1955)
- Pete the Panic #1 (Nov. 1955)

=== Timor ===
- Algie #1–3 (Dec. 1953 – April 1954)
- Animal Adventures #1–3 (Dec. 1953 – April 1954)
- Blazing Western #1–5 (Jan.–Sept. 1954)
- Crime Detector #1–5 (Jan.–July 1954)
