= Ken Battefield =

- Born: 1905
- Died: 1966 (aged 60–61)
- Area: Artist
- Notable works: Standard Comics

Ken Battefield (1905–1966) was a prolific comic book artist and illustrators of pulp fiction in the 1940s and early 1950s, during the Golden Age of Comic Books. He is most associated with the Nedor Publishing line of books where, at various times, he illustrated Pyroman, Doc Strange, Black Terror, American Eagle, The Scarab, Captain Future, and many others.

In the latter days of working with that company he was hired to produce large amounts of work which was then "punched" up by Rafael Astarita and Graham Ingels. Through the Chessler, Funnies Inc., Iger, and Benjamin W. Sangor studios, as well as freelance, he also did work for Ace Periodicals, Fox Publications, DC Comics, Charlton Comics, Fiction House, Novelty Press, Ajax-Farrell, Hillman Periodicals, Holyoke Publishing, Harvey Comics, Quality Comics, Street and Smith, and more.

Among Battefield's other projects was the January 1958 revised edition of Classics Illustrated #54, The Man in the Iron Mask.

While working for the Chesler Shop, Battefield met a young Carmine Infantino in a coffee shop, and subsequently got him his first comics job in that studio.
