= Ben Oda =

Japanese-American letterer

- Born: December 21, 1915 United States
- Died: November 28, 1984 (aged 68) Englewood, New Jersey, US
- Area: Letterer
- Spouse: Nishi Oda

Ben Oda (December 21, 1915 – November 28, 1984) was a Japanese-American letterer for comic books and comic strips.

He graduated from Chouinard Art Institute and began his career as an apprentice at Walt Disney Studios. During World War II, Oda was a paratrooper with the U.S. Army's 442nd Combat Team.

Oda lettered for two major comic strip syndicates: the Chicago Tribune Syndicate and King Features Syndicate. Comic strips lettered by Oda include Apartment 3-G, Big Ben Bolt, Dondi, The Dropouts, Flash Gordon, Johnny Hazard, Little Orphan Annie, Miss Peach, On Stage, The Phantom, Prince Valiant, Rip Kirby, The Spirit and Steve Canyon.

He entered the comics industry after World War II; some of his earliest lettering was for Hillman Periodicals' Airboy and Real Clue Crime Stories, which connected him with the Simon & Kirby team. In the 1950s, his lettering appeared in the EC Comics edited by Harvey Kurtzman. An account cited that Kurtzman met Oda at the Charles William Harvey Studio during one of Oda's visits, a custom for him when he was working on assignments. When Kurtzman was hired at EC Comics, he insisted on the behind-the-scenes control of the EC art and he favored Oda's style as opposed to Al Feldstein's. He became a prolific letterer at DC Comics for many years, until his death, working on such books as Action Comics, Aquaman, Justice League of America, Wonder Woman, Young Romance, Teen Titans, New Teen Titans and a plethora of others.

His wife, Nishi Oda, also did lettering.

Odaballoon, created by Oda's family, is an official freeware typeface in his lettering style.

In 2019, Oda was recognized for his contributions to the comic book medium and inducted into the Harvey Awards Hall of Fame during New York Comic Con. His award was posthumously introduced by former DC Comics President and Publisher Paul Levitz.
