= 1966 in comics =

Notable events of 1966 in comics.

== Events and publications ==
=== Year overall ===
- Myron Fass founds Eerie Publications and M. F. Enterprises
- In Italy, while the success of Satanik generates several black comics with female protagonists (Samantha, Masokis, Super women, Jena), all short lived, the writer and publisher Renzo Barbieri launches the first explicitly erotic comics (the spy-story Goldrake, the peplum Messalina, the swashbuckler Isabella).

=== January ===
- January 1: The final episode of Theo Fünke Kupper's De Verstrooide Professor is published.
- January 4: Greg and Hermann's Bernard Prince makes his debut.
- January 8: The final issue of the Italian comics magazine Il Vittorioso is published.
- January 9: For the first time since 1952 a new episode of Will Eisner's The Spirit is published.
- January 9: in the French magazine Vaillant, debut of the series Le Grêlé 7/13, by Lucien Nortier and Roger Lécureux, with a young maquisard as protagonist.
- January 18: in Le journal de Tintin, Concerto pour pilotes by Jean Graton.
- January 21: The final episode of Pieter Kuhn's Kapitein Rob is published. The artist died one day earlier.
- January 22: The first issue of the British comics magazine Lady Penelope is published. It will run until 13 December 1969.
- Adventure Comics (1938 series) #340 – DC Comics – The first appearance of Computo by writer Jerry Siegel and artist Curt Swan.
- Hawkman (1964 series) #11 – DC Comics – The first appearance of the Shrike by writer Gardner Fox and artist Murphy Anderson
- House of Mystery (1951 series) #156 – DC Comics – First Dial H for Hero by writer Dave Wood and artist Jim Mooney
- Peter Cannon, Thunderbolt (1966 series) #1 – Charlton Comics – The first appearance of Peter Cannon, Thunderbolt by creator Pete Morisi

=== February ===
- February 5: The first issue of the British comics magazine Smash is published. It will run until April 1971.
- February 6: Bob West's Theophilus makes its debut. It will run until 19 April 2002.
- February 10: Francis' Marc Lebut et son Voisin debuts in Spirou, where it will run for 20 years.
- February 27: Dick Cavalli's Winthrop makes its debut, after debuting under the different name Morty Meekle on 9 January 1956. The series will run until 1994.
- In Quino's Mafalda Miguelito makes his debut.
- The first episode of Max Bunker and Roberto Raviola (Magnus) 's Gesebel is published. It will run until October 1967.
- Vibranium makes its first Marvel Universe appearance, in Daredevil #13
- Adventure Comics (1938 series) #341 – DC Comics – Triplicate Girl (Luornu Durgo) becomes Duo Damsel after Computo destroys one of her selves.
- Journey into Mystery (1952 series) #125 – Marvel Comics – Final issue of the series. Becomes Thor with next issue
- Justice League of America (1960 series) #42 – DC Comics – Metamorpho refuses membership in the Justice League
- Showcase (1956 series) #60 – DC Comics – The first Silver-Age appearance of the Spectre by writer Gardner Fox and artist Murphy Anderson
- Fightin' Air Force, with issue #53, is canceled by Charlton.

=== March ===
- March 1: The first episode of José Miguel Heredia's Perro Mundo is published.
- Adventure Comics (1938 series) #342 – DC Comics – Star Boy is expelled from the Legion of Super-Heroes.
- Challengers of the Unknown (1958 series) #48 – DC Comics – Doom Patrol cross-over
- Doom Patrol (1964 series) #102 – DC Comics – Challengers of the Unknown cross-over
- Fantastic Four (1961 series) #48 – Marvel Comics – First appearance of the Silver Surfer and Galactus by writer Stan Lee and artist Jack Kirby
- Green Lantern (1960 series) #43 – DC Comics – First appearance of Major Disaster by writer Gardner Fox and artist Gil Kane
- Justice League of America (1960 series) #43 – DC Comics – First appearance of the Royal Flush Gang by writer Gardner Fox and artist Mike Sekowsky
- Tales of Suspense (1959 series) #75 – Marvel Comics – first appearance of Sharon Carter and Batroc the Leaper by writer Stan Lee and artists Jack Kirby and Dick Ayers
- Thor (1952 series) #126 – Marvel Comics – Title becomes Thor. Previously Journey into Mystery
- First issue of the photo comics Killing (Pino Ponzoni editor), written by Luigi Naviglio, that fits into the genre of Italian black comics, but with higher doses of sex and violence.

=== April ===
- April 3 in France, first issue of Mickey parade, magazine of Disney comics (the most of Italian production).
- April 7: In Peyo's The Smurfs the characters Smurfette and Poetry Smurf makes their debut in the story La Schtroumpfette.
- April 7: In Pilote, first chapter of L’homme a l’etoile d’argent, by Jean-Michel Charlier and Jean Giraud.
- April 16: The final episode of Little Annie Rooney is published.
- April 28: In Pilote, first chapter of Asterix and the normans, by Goscinny and Uderzo.
- Lenny of Laredo (Print Mint) — the underground printing and distribution business publishes its first comic, a reprint of Joel Beck's self-published title
- The adventures of Jodelle, by Guy Peelaert.
- First issue of Nuova collana Araldo (Edizioni Araldo); after two short miniseries, from September the magazine hosts Comandante Mark.

=== May ===
- May 1: The first issue of the American comics magazine Ghostly Tales is published. It will run until October 1984.
- May 2:
  - Francisco Ibáñez Talavera's Pepe Gotera y Otilio makes its debut.
  - John M. Burns' The Seekers makes its debut in The Daily Sketch. It will run until 1971.
- May 9: Il passato di Tex by Gian Luigi Bonelli and Galep; the origins of Tex Willer and his life before his first appearance in comics are revealed.
- May 19: in Spirou, first chapter of Tortillas pour les Dalton, by Goscinny and Morris.
- May 21: Martin Lodewijk's Agent 327 makes its debut in the Dutch comics magazine Pep.
- The final episode of the Superman comic strip is published.
- The Ultimate Nullifier makes its Marvel Universe debut, in Fantastic Four #50
- Ghostly Tales debuts with issue #55, taking over the numbering of Unusual Tales. (Charlton)
- Judomaster debuts with issue #89, taking over the numbering of Gunmaster. (Charlton)
- Fightin' Navy, with issue #125, ceases publication (it is briefly revived in 1983). (Charlton)
- Emil Eagle makes his debut in The evil inventor, by Vic Lockman and Jack Bradbury (on Uncle Scrooge).

=== June ===
- June 1: In the 103rd issue of Mad Paul Coker's Horrifying Clichés series makes its debut.
- June 18: The final issue of the British comics magazine Ranger is published. It merges with Look and Learn on 25 June.
- June 28: In Le journal de Tintin, Rapt sur le France by André-Paul Duchâteau and Tibet.
- Fantastic Four #51, "This Man... This Monster!" by Stan Lee and Jack Kirby (Marvel Comics)

=== Summer ===
- The first issue of Wally Wood's underground comics magazine Witzend is published.

=== July ===
- July 25: Il misterioso mister P. by Gian Luigi Bonelli and Guglielmo Letteri; debut of Proteus, thief and master of disguises, antagonist of Tex Willer.
- The Cosmic Cube makes its first Marvel Universe appearance, in Tales of Suspense #79
- Adventure Comics #346 — Jim Shooter makes his debut as a comics writer with the Legion of Super-Heroes story One of Us Is a Traitor.
- Marvel Tales #3 (renamed from Marvel Tales Annual), becomes an ongoing title (Marvel Comics)
- Fantastic Four #52 introduces Black Panther (Marvel Comics)
- The Brave and the Bold #54 introduces Teen Titans, by Bob Haney and Bruno Premiani.
- Treasure of Marco Polo, by Carl Barks, on Uncle Scrooge 66.
- First issue of Teddy Bob (Astoria) by Pier Carpi; the series is inspired to the youth culture of the Sixties and has a teen-ager beatnik as protagonist.
- In France, debut of Comandante Mark by EsseGEsse, for Aventures & Voyages editions, with the name of Captain Swing.

=== August ===
- August 22: In Charles M. Schulz' Peanuts Peppermint Patty makes her debut.
- Adventure Comics #347: It marks the conclusion of the Legion of Super-Heroes story arc, "One of Us Is a Traitor".
- The Amazing Spider-Man #39 (Marvel Comics): "How Green Was My Goblin".

=== September ===
- September 3: The final episode of Edwina Dumm's Cap Stubbs and Tippie is published. It will run until February 1983.
- September 26: In Tintin, first chapter of Flight 714 to Sydney, by Hergè.
- The first issue of the American comics magazine Eerie is published.
- The first issue of the Provo magazine God, Nederland en Oranje is published. Two cartoons by Willem lead to a court case for insulting public authority and lèse-majesté. He will in 1968 eventually only be sentenced for the first account, not the second.
- The Amazing Spider-Man #40 (Marvel Comics): "Spidey Saves The Day"
- Thor Annual #2 renamed from Journey into Mystery Annual (Marvel Comics)
- With issue #110, DC Comics suspends publication of Mystery in Space (1951 series); the title is temporarily revived in 1980.

=== October ===
- October 22: The first gag of Stefan Verwey's comic Broeder Gosewiijn is published in Katholieke Illustratie.
- After the first edition was held in Bordighera, Italy, the year before the Lucca Comics festival is now held in Lucca, Italy, where it is still held to this day as one of the oldest comics festivals in the world.
- At the University of Strasbourg André Bertrand creates the four-page comic strip La Retour de la Colonne Durutti (The Return of the Durutti Column, 1966), which is distributed as a pamphlet during student protests.

=== November ===
- November 10: In Pilote, the first chapter of the Astérix story Asterix the legionary, by René Goscinny and Albert Uderzo is published.
- November 24: in Pilote, first chapter of Le cheval de fer, by Jean-Michel Charier and Jean Giraud, inaugurating the Blueberry’s saga of the “iron horse”.
- The Flash #165: Barry Allen marries Iris West (DC Comics).
- The Amazing Spider-Man In issue #42, drawn by John Romita Sr., Mary Jane Watson is first revealed to the readers, after being an invisible character for two years. She hereby utters the now immortal line: Face it, tiger... you just hit the jackpot.
- Le mystère des abîmes, by Philippe Druillet, first Lone Sloane album.

=== December ===
- December 7::La preda umana, by Guido Nolitta and Gallieno Feri; debut of the likeable outlaw Guitar Jim, both friend and adversary of Zagor.
- December 18: In the Italian Disney comics magazine Topolino the first episode of The Miner's Granddaughter, by Romano Scarpa is published, in which Dickie Duck makes his debut.
- The first episode of Giorgio Cavedon and Sandro Angiolini's Isabella is published.

== Births ==
=== February ===
- February 16: Martin Perscheid, German comics artist (Perscheids Abgründe), (d. 2021).

=== July ===
- July 11: Kentaro Miura, Japanese comics/manga artist (Berserk), (d. 2021).

=== November ===
- November 17: Ed Brubaker, American comic book writer (Batman, Captain America, X-Men, Daredevil).

== Deaths ==
=== January ===
- January 20: Pieter Kuhn, Dutch comics artist (Kapitein Rob), dies at age 55.
- January 28: George Van Raemdonck, Belgian painter, cartoonist and comic artist (Bulletje en Boonestaak), dies at age 78.

=== February ===
- February 13:
  - George Scarbo, American comics artist (Be Sure You're Right, Closeup and Comedy, The Comic Zoo, Zoo's Whoo, Tinymites, The Great American Home, Radiomania, Ticklers), dies at age 67.
  - Tony Royle, British comics artist (Poll, Jock and Valentine, continued Belinda), dies at age 66.

=== March ===
- March 8: Francisco Darnis, Spanish comics artist (Nick Pecho de Hiero, El Jabato), dies at age 56.
- March 15: Henriette Willebeek le Mair, Dutch illustrator and comics artist (reillustrated Heinrich Hoffmann's Der Struwwelpeter), dies at age 76.

=== April ===
- April 5: Charles Raab, American comics artist (Foreign Correspondent, assisted on Terry and the Pirates, Charlie Chan, continued The Adventures of Patsy), dies at age 57.
- April 28:
  - Jesse Marsh, American comics artist and animator (Tarzan, John Carter of Mars, comics based on Gene Autry), dies at age 58.
  - Gladys Parker, American comics artist (Mopsy, continued Flapper Fanny Says), dies at age 58.

=== May ===
- May 2: John Forte, American comic book artist (Superman, Legion of Super-Heroes), dies at age 47.

=== June ===
- June 8: Clyde Lamb, American comics artist (Herman), dies at age 53.

=== July ===
- July 16: Leslie Elton, American animator and comics artist (Jack Daw's Adventures), dies at age 72.

=== August ===
- August 7: Charles Thorson, Canadian editorial cartoonist, animator, illustrator and comic artist (Little Hiawatha), dies at age 75.
- August 24: Boris Angelushev, Bulgarian caricaturist, illustrator and comics artist, dies at age 63.

=== September ===
- September 26: Gus Edson, American comics writer and artist (Streaky, Dondi, continued The Gumps), dies at age 65.

=== October ===
- October 13: Henry Louis Diamond, British comics artist (Mikey Midge the Merry Midget), dies at age 62.

=== November ===
- November 7: Bob Wood, American comics artist (Crime Does Not Pay), dies at age 49 in a traffic accident.
- November 17: Lóránd Andor, Hungarian painter, graphic artist and cartoonist (13th District Secondary School), dies at age 60.

=== December ===
- December 15: Walt Disney, American animator, film producer, voice actor and businessman (Mr. George's Wife, Walt Disney's Comics & Stories), dies at age 65.
- December 19: Ken Battefield, American comics artist (Rick O'Shay), dies at age 61.

=== Specific date unknown ===
- Jack Betts, American comics artist (drew advertising comics), dies at age 61 or 62.
- Jeff Hayes, American comics artist (continued Adamson's Adventures as Silent Sam), dies at age 62 or 63.
- S.K. Perkins, British comics artist (Spadger's XI, The Adventures of Elsie, Winnie and Johnny, Smiler the Sweeper), dies at age 76 or 77.
- Jon Small, British comics artist (Bulletman), dies at an unknown age.
- Giorgio Scudellari, Chilean-Italian comics artist (illegal Mickey Mouse newspaper comics, continued Fulmine), dies at age 57 or 58.
- Ed Wheelan, American cartoonist (Minute Movies), dies at age 80.

== Conventions ==
- July 23–24: New York Comicon (Park Sheraton Hotel, New York City) — produced by John Benson — guests include Jack Kirby, Jim Steranko, Otto Binder, Len Brown, Larry Ivie, Jack Binder, Roy Thomas, Gil Kane, Archie Goodwin, bhob Stewart, Klaus Nordling, Sal Trapani, Rocke Mastroserio and Ted White; keynote speech by Kirby, a discussion about censorship between Don Thompson and Comics Code Authority acting administrator Leonard Darvin, a panel about the Golden Age of Comics, and one on the "so-called 'Forgotten ’50s,' particularly EC Comics. Bhob Stewart, on a panel with Archie Goodwin and Ted White, predicts that there will soon be "underground comics" just as there are already "underground films."
- July 23–24: Southwestern Con (Hotel Southland, Dallas, Texas) — c. 70 attendees; organized by Larry Herndon; official guest is Academy of Comic-Book Fans and Collectors executive secretary/"Academy Con" promoter Dave Kaler
- July 29–31: Gateway Con (St. Louis, Missouri) — produced by the Gateway Comic Art Fan Club of St. Louis; guests include Reed Crandall, Ted White, Steve Gerber, and Al Capp. Films shown include the complete 12-chapter serial Adventures of Captain Marvel (1941).
- August 12–14: Academy Con II (City Squire Inn, New York City) — produced by Dave Kaler; official guests include Stan Lee, Roy Thomas, Bill Everett, Carmine Infantino, Julius Schwartz, and Bill Finger
- September 24–25: Salone Internazionale dei Comics (Lucca, Italy) — 2nd annual show moves to a small piazza in the center of Lucca

== Awards ==
=== Alley Awards ===
Best Comic Magazine Section

- Adventure Book with the Main Character in the Title – The Amazing Spider-Man (Marvel Comics)
- Multi-Feature Title – Tales of Suspense (Marvel Comics)
- Super Hero Group Title – Fantastic Four (Marvel Comics)
- Normal Group Adventure Title – M.A.R.S. Patrol (Gold Key Comics)
- Fantasy/SF/Supernatural Title – Strange Adventures (DC Comics)
- Western Title – Kid Colt, Outlaw (Marvel Comics)
- War Title – Sgt. Fury and his Howling Commandos (Marvel Comics)
- Humor Title: Teenage – Archie (Archie Comics)
- Humor Title: Costumed – Inferior Five (DC Comics)
- Humor Title: Juvenile – Uncle Scrooge (Western Publishing)
- All-Reprint Title – The Spirit (Harvey Comics)
- Combination New & Reprint Material Title – Fantastic Four Annual (Marvel Comics)

Best Professional Work

- Editor – Stan Lee (Marvel Comics)
- Writer – Stan Lee (Marvel Comics)
- Pencil Work – Al Williamson
- Inking Work – Wally Wood
- Cover – Flash Gordon #1, by Al Williamson (King Comics)
- Coloring – Flash Gordon (King Comics)
- Best Full-Length Story – "How Green was My Goblin", by Stan Lee & John Romita, Sr., The Amazing Spider-Man #39 (Marvel Comics)
- Feature Story – "Return to Mongo", by Al Williamson, Flash Gordon #1 (King Comics)
- Regular Short Feature – "Tales of Asgard" by Stan Lee and Jack Kirby, in The Mighty Thor (Marvel Comics)
- Hall of Fame – n.a.
- Popularity Poll – n.a.

Newspaper Strip Section

- Best Adventure Strip – The Phantom, by Lee Falk
- Best Human Interest Strip – On Stage, by Leonard Starr
- Best Humor Strip – Peanuts, by Charles Schulz
- Best Humor Panel – Dennis the Menace, by Hank Ketcham
- Best Miscellaneous Strip – Feiffer, by Jules Feiffer
- Hall of Fame Award – Flash Gordon, by Alex Raymond
- Best All-Time Great Comic Strip – Flash Gordon, by Alex Raymond

Fan Activity Section

- Best All-Article Fanzine – (tie) Batmania and TNT/Slam-Bang
- Best All-Comics Fanzine – Odd
- Best All-Fiction Fanzine – Batwing
- Best Article/Comic Fanzine – Fantasy Illustrated
- Best Fiction/Comic Fanzine – Comic Art, by Don & Maggie Thompson
- Best Article/Fiction Fanzine – n.a.
- Best Fannish One-Shot – The Spirit (reruns), Ed Aprill
- Best Article on Comic Book Material – "Quality Comics Group"
- Best Article on Newspaper Strips – "Pride of the Navy"
- Best Regular Fan Column – "What's News", by Dave Kaler
- Best Fan Fiction – "White Dragon Strikes"
- Best Fan Comic Strip – "Xal-Kor", by Richard "Grass" Green
- Best Fan Artist – Richard "Grass" Green
- Best Comic Strip Writer – Richard "Grass" Green
- Best Fan Project – Ed Aprill's reprints
- Best Newsletter – Dateline: Comicdom

=== National Cartoonists Society Division Awards ===
- Newspaper Comic Strips (Humor): Beetle Bailey, by Mort Walker
- Newspaper Comic Strips (Story): Rip Kirby, by John Prentice
- Newspaper Panel Cartoons: Berry's World, by Jim Berry
- Gag Cartoons: Jack Tippit
- Comic Books: Al Williamson
- Advertising and Illustration: Dick Hodgins, Jr.
- Editorial Cartoons: Bill Crawford
- Sports Cartoons: Bruce Stark
- Special Features: Prince Valiant, by Hal Foster
- Reuben Award: The Little King, by Otto Soglow

== First issues by title ==
=== Harvey Comics ===
Bunny
Release: December.

Double-Dare Adventures
Release: December. Writer: Otto Binder. Artist: Bill Draut

Spyman
Release: September. Artists: George Tuska, Jim Steranko, Dick Ayers

=== Other publishers ===
Comandante Mark – Sergio Bonelli editore
Release: September Artist: EsseGesse

Fantasy Masterpieces — Marvel Comics
Release: February. Editor: Stan Lee

Gesebel — Editoriale Corno
Release: February. Writer: Max Bunker. Artist: Magnus

Golden Legacy — Fitzgerald Publishing Co.
Writer: Leo Carty. Artist: Leo Carty

Henry Brewster — M. F. Enterprises
Release: February. Writer: Bob Powell. Artist: Bob Powell

Lady Penelope — City Magazines
Release: 22 January.

Peter Cannon, Thunderbolt — Charlton Comics
Release: January. Writer: Pete Morisi. Artist: Pete Morisi

Smash! — International Publishing Corporation
Release: February 1966. Editor: Albert Cosser ("Cos")

Teddy Bob – Astorina
Release: July – Artist: Pier Carpi

Teen Titans — DC Comics
Release: January. Writer: Bob Haney. Artist: Nick Cardy

Undersea Agent — Tower Comics
Release: January. Artist: Ray Bailey

Weird (listed as vol. 1, #10) — Eerie Publications
Release: January. Editor: Roger Elwood

witzend — Wally Wood (self-published)
Release: Summer. Editor: Wally Wood

Zorro — Gold Key Comics
Release: January. Artist: Alex Toth

== Initial appearances by character name ==
=== Charlton Comics ===
- Blue Beetle (Ted Kord), in Captain Atom vol. 2, #83 (November)
- Doctor M.T. Graves, in Ghostly Tales #55 (May)
- Doctor Spectro, in Captain Atom #79 (February)
- Nightshade, in Captain Atom #82 (September)
- Peacemaker, in Fightin' 5 #40 (November)
- Peter Cannon, Thunderbolt, in Thunderbolt #1 (January)

=== DC Comics ===
- The Ant, in Teen Titans #5 (Sept.)
- R. J. Brande, in Adventure Comics #350 (Nov.)
- Cluemaster, in Detective Comics #351 (May)
- Computo, in Adventure Comics #340 (Jan.)
- Dial H for Hero, in House of Mystery #156 (Jan.)
- Ding Dong Daddy, in Teen Titans #3 (Jan.)
- Luornu Durgo (as Duo Damsel), in Adventure Comics #341 (Feb.)
- Enchantress, in Strange Adventures #187 (Apr.)
- Ferro Lad, in Adventure Comics #346 (July)
- Karate Kid, in Adventure Comics #346 (July)
- Khund, in Adventure Comics #346 (July)
- Ocean Master, in Aquaman #29 (Sept.)
- Chief O'Hara, in World's Finest Comics #159 (August)
- Nemesis Kid, in Adventure Comics #346 (July)
- Outsider, in Detective Comics #356 (Oct.)
- Parasite, in Action Comics #340 (August)
- Poison Ivy, in Batman #181 (June)
- Prince Evillo, in Adventure Comics #350 (Nov.)
- Royal Flush Gang, in Justice League of America #43 (Mar.)
- Shaggy Man, in Justice League of America #45 (June)
- Shrike, in Hawkman #11 (Jan.)
- Spellbinder (Delbert Billings), in Detective Comics #358 (Dec.)
- Stanley and His Monster, in The Fox and the Crow #95 (Jan.)
- Universo, in Adventure Comics #349 (Oct.)
- Unknown Soldier, in Our Army at War #168 (June)
- Rond Vidar, in Adventure Comics #349 (Oct.)
- White Witch, in Adventure Comics #350 (Nov,)

=== Harvey Comics ===
- Bee-Man, in Double-Dare Adventures #1 (Dec.)
- Bunny, in Bunny #1 (Dec.)
- Jigsaw, in Jigsaw (Sept.)
- Spyman, in Spyman #1 (Sept.)

=== Marvel Comics ===
- Ares, in Thor #129 (June)
- Batroc the Leaper, in Tales of Suspense #75 (Mar.)
- Black Panther, in Fantastic Four #52 (July)
- Boomerang, in Tales to Astonish #81 (July)
- Peggy Carter, in Tales of Suspense #77 (May)
- Sharon Carter, in Tales of Suspense #75 (Mar.)
- Collector, in Avengers #28 (May)
- Dionysus, in Thor #129 (June)
- Dredmund the Druid, in Strange Tales vol. 1 #144 (May)
- Ego the Living Planet, in Thor #132 (Sept.)
- Elders of the Universe, in Avengers #28 (May)
- Fafnir, in Thor #134 (Nov.)
- Fixer, in Strange Tales #141 (Feb.)
- Bill Foster, in Avengers #32 (Sept.)
- Freak, in Tales of Suspense #74 (Feb.)
- Galactus, in Fantastic Four #48 (Mar.)
- Hera, in Thor #129 (June)
- High Evolutionary, in Thor #134 (Nov.)
- Gladiator, in Daredevil #18 (July)
- Hippolyta, in Thor #127 (Apr.)
- Kaluu, in Strange Tales #147 (Aug.)
- Klaw, in Fantastic Four #53 (Aug.)
- Living Laser, in Avengers #34 (Nov.)
- Looter, in The Amazing Spider-Man #36 (May)
- Man-Beast, in Thor #135 (Dec.)
- Masked Marauder, in Daredevil #16 (May)
- Maximus, in Fantastic Four #47 (Feb.)
- Mentallo, in Strange Tales #141 (Feb.)
- Mimic, in Uncanny X-Men #19 (Apr.)
- New Men, in Thor #135 (Dec.)
- Plunderer, in Daredevil #13 (Feb.)
- Pluto, in Thor #127 (Apr.)
- Punisher, in Fantastic Four #49 (Apr.)
- Prester John, in Fantastic Four #54 (Sept.)
- Quasimodo, in Fantastic Four Annual #4 (Nov.)
- Rhino, in The Amazing Spider-Man #41 (Oct.)
- Silver Surfer, in Fantastic Four #48 (Mar.)
- Jasper Sitwell, in Strange Tales #144 (May)
- Mendel Stromm, in The Amazing Spider-Man #37 (June)
- Ultimo, in Tales of Suspense #76 (Apr.)
- Umar, in Strange Tales #150 (Nov.)
- Valkyrior, in Thor #133 (Oct.)
- Mary Jane Watson, in The Amazing Spider-Man #42 (Nov.)
- Wyatt Wingfoot, in Fantastic Four #50 (May)

=== Other publishers ===
- Emil Eagle – Disney (May)
- Diclie Duck, by Romano Scarpa, in Topolino (December)
- Jodelle, in Hara-Kiri (Éditions du Square)
- Lone Sloane, in Mystère des Abîmes
- Pepe Gotera y Otilio, in Tío Vivo (April 2)
- Peppermint Patty, in Peanuts (August 22)
- Sally the Witch, in Ribon
- Smurfette, in Spirou (Dupuis)
