= This Man... This Monster! =

1966 Fantastic Four Comic Book

- Cover art to Fantastic Four #51. Art by Jack Kirby.
- Publisher: Marvel Comics
- Publication date: June 1966
- Genre: Superhero
- Title(s): Fantastic Four #51
- Main character: Fantastic Four

Creative team
- Writer: Stan Lee
- Artist: Jack Kirby
- Inker: Joe Sinnott
- Letterer: Artie Simek
- Editor: Stan Lee

"This Man... This Monster!" is a superhero story in the Marvel Comics series Fantastic Four. Written by Stan Lee and illustrated by Jack Kirby, it was published in Fantastic Four #51 in 1966. The story is about Benjamin Grimm, known as the Thing, a member of the superhero team the Fantastic Four whose body is made of stone. "This Man... This Monster!" considers what makes someone a monster, and it revisits previous ideas introduced in Fantastic Four, including Ben's desire to restore his human form, the redemption of villains through sacrifice, and the nature of exploration and introspection.

"This Man... This Monster!" begins with Ben being captured by a scientist who resents the Fantastic Four member Reed Richards. The scientist steals Ben's powers and becomes the Thing, while Ben reverts to his human form. Reed and Susan Storm believe the scientist to be the real Thing, and Reed asks the imposter to hold his lifeline during a voyage to an alternate dimension. The imposter is surprised by Reed's selflessness in conducting a dangerous experiment without seeking glory, and he goes into the dimension after him when the lifeline snaps, sacrificing himself to save Reed. The story also features a brief intermission showing the Fantastic Four member Johnny Storm attending college.

"This Man... This Monster!" is among the most highly praised Fantastic Four stories and is included in the widely celebrated run that Lee and Kirby published between 1965 and 1967. Kirby's artwork in particular is praised, including a psychedelic art collage of Reed exploring the Negative Zone. The unnamed scientist was referenced in later stories where he was given the name Ricardo Jones. The story introduced the recurring character Wyatt Wingfoot and the alternate dimension that came to be known as the Negative Zone.

== Plot ==
Roaming the streets, Ben is invited into the home of a scientist. The scientist gives Ben coffee laced with a sedative, and Ben falls asleep on the man's sofa. The man uses a device to transfer the Thing's powers to himself, causing himself to look like the Thing and Ben to become human. A few days later, the imposter Thing goes to the Fantastic Four's headquarters, the Baxter Building, in hopes of proving himself superior by defeating the Fantastic Four. Ben arrives at the Baxter Building to warn the Fantastic Four, but Reed Richards and Susan Storm believe him to be the imposter so he storms out. Meanwhile, at Metro University, Fantastic Four member Johnny Storm and his friend Wyatt Wingfoot get involved in an argument with a football star until it is broken up by the coach. The coach suggests that Wyatt join the team on account of his father's athletic prowess, but Wyatt refuses.

At the Baxter Building, Reed tests a portal to an antimatter dimension. He has the imposter Thing hold his safety tether, and the man is surprised to see Reed pursuing scientific advances at personal risk without seeking publicity. He decides to save Reed and pull him back, but he waits too long and the tether snaps. The imposter Thing leaps in to save Reed, sacrificing himself to throw Reed back through the portal. Ben goes to visit his girlfriend Alicia, hoping that she will still recognize him because she is blind and will not be affected by his appearance. As he knocks on her door, he reverts to the Thing upon the imposter's death. He returns to the Baxter Building and they realize that Ben, the real Thing, is still alive. Reed expresses his gratitude for the imposter's decision to save him.

== Creation and publication ==
Jack Kirby used psychedelic art to portray the Negative Zone.

"This Man... This Monster!" was published in Fantastic Four #51, written by Stan Lee and illustrated by Jack Kirby, with a June 1966 cover date. Lee and Kirby worked on the comic book series Fantastic Four, about the superhero team the Fantastic Four, from 1961 to 1970. "This Man... This Monster!" focuses on Benjamin Grimm, the Thing, a member of the Fantastic Four who has a body made of stone. Joe Sinnott inked the story and Artie Simek was its letterer.

Issue #51 came approximately halfway into their run, during a period of highly celebrated work on the series between 1965 and 1967. It immediately followed "The Galactus Trilogy" in issues #48–50 and preceded the introduction of the Black Panther in issue #52. It continues from the end of "The Galactus Trilogy", where Ben leaves because he fears that his girlfriend Alicia Masters has fallen in love with the Silver Surfer. The villain of "This Man... This Monster!" makes a brief appearance in issue #50 where he expresses contempt for the Fantastic Four. The story was also used to introduce the character of Wyatt Wingfoot, who became a supporting character for the Fantastic Four.

Kirby's art reflects common techniques that he used, including heavy machinery made up of complex geometric shapes and crackling energy now described as Kirby Krackle. Reed's exploration of an alternate dimension invokes the concept of the sublime as the page illustrates the space and Reed describes the dimension's infinite nature. Kirby has frequently invoked such vastness and cosmic scales, including his depictions of Asgard, Galactus, and Ego the Living Planet. The image of Reed exploring the alternate dimension for the first time has become well known among comic book art. It features Reed and his speech bubble laid atop a collage of psychedelic art. When drawing the scene, Kirby left a note describing how the scene should be written: "Reed drifts in dimensional space—it's both weird and beautiful". Kirby also reserved a full page for an illustration of Reed's portal device.

== Themes and analysis ==
"This Man... This Monster!" emphasizes characterization over action, and the characters' superhuman abilities are used sparingly. It contrasts with the stories published immediately before and after it, which were based on spectacle and new developments in the Marvel Universe. The story is about Ben's wish to regain a human form, and it opens with Ben standing solemnly in the rain, lamenting his monstrous form. The story's arc follows the path of an unnamed villain who redeems himself. Evil versions of characters are common in Marvel stories, and the villain of "This Man... This Monster!" is one of many villains by Lee and Kirby who achieve redemption by sacrificing themselves. Little is revealed about the character beyond his dislike of Reed, allowing Lee and Kirby to use him as a basic representation of good and evil.

"This Man... This Monster!" reflects on several themes that are common in Fantastic Four. It incorporates a balance between external exploration and internal reflection. It suggests that things beyond daily life are achievable but require courage to find them, and it presents family, friendship, self-image, and worldview as defining motivations for one's actions. The story also considers what it means to be a monster; Ben's character is one of self-pity, resenting that his body is made of stone. Ben potentially reverting to human form was a long-running plot point in Fantastic Four.

== Reception and legacy ==
"This Man... This Monster!" is one of the most positively received issues of the Fantastic Four series. Comic book writers Mark Waid and Jerry Ordway consider "This Man... This Monster!" to be their favorite Fantastic Four story, with Waid complimenting its structure. Kurt Busiek described it as one of the best alongside "The Galactus Trilogy". Dave Sim considered it the final issue of Kirby and Lee's best work on Fantastic Four, saying that their run "tailed off" as the Wyatt Wingfoot and the Negative Zone stories continued. The story was one of eleven issues selected by Marvel Comics for its 1992 collection The Very Best of Marvel Comics. In 2025, ComicBook.com writer Shawn Lealos ranked "This Man... This Monster!" as the tenth-best Fantastic Four story, praising its focus on a "smaller personal narrative" after the team's encounter with Galactus. The same year, Den of Geek writer Joe George described the story as emblemic of Marvel's focus on tales about flawed heroes from the period, owing to its focus on the Thing. George ranked it as the fifth-best Fantastic Four story, praising Kirby's art and Lee's writing; particularly the story's melancholic tone.

The dimension Reed explores in the story is revisited in future comics, where it is called the Negative Zone. The storyline in which Johnny and Wyatt interact with the football coach was abandoned after the story's publication and never referenced again. The first issue of Ms. Marvel, featuring Carol Danvers, was titled "This Woman, This Warrior!" in reference to "This Man... This Monster!" as part of its attempt to brand the series through nostalgia. Sim suggested that the story about the Thing in Marvel Fanfare #15 (1984), created by Barry Windsor-Smith, was inspired by "This Man... This Monster!". The unnamed scientist in the story was given a name, Ricardo Jones, in an issue of Web of Spider-Man 25 years after the story's publication. The graphic novel Fantastic Four: Full Circle by Alex Ross acts as a loose continuation of "This Man... This Monster!".

== Notes ==
=== Bibliography ===
- Bukatman, Scott (2019). "The Crossroads of Infinity, or Universum Incognitum". In Grant, Barry Keith; Henderson, Scott (eds.). Comics and Pop Culture: Adaptation from Panel to Frame. University of Texas Press. pp. 19–35. ISBN 978-1-4773-1938-3.
- Dalton, Russell W. (2011). Marvelous Myths: Marvel Superheroes and Everyday Faith. Chalice Press. ISBN 978-0-8272-2360-8.
- Wolk, Douglas (2021-10-12). All of the Marvels: A Journey to the Ends of the Biggest Story Ever Told. Penguin. ISBN 978-0-7352-2216-8.
