= De Notenkraker =

Dutch political and satirical weekly magazine

De Notenkraker The Nutcracker
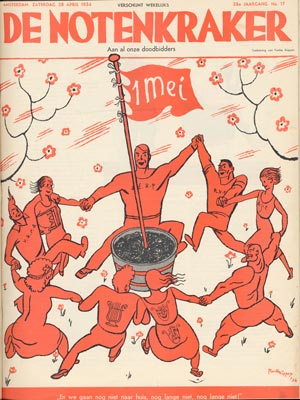
- Cover with maypole
- Editor in Chief: A.M. de Jong
- Categories: political satire
- Frequency: weekly
- Circulation: c. 8,000 (1918)
- Publisher: The Workers Press
- Founded: 1902; 123 years ago as Het Zondagsblad
- First issue: 5 January 1907; 118 years ago
- Final issue: 11 July 1936; 88 years ago
- Country: Netherlands
- Language: Dutch

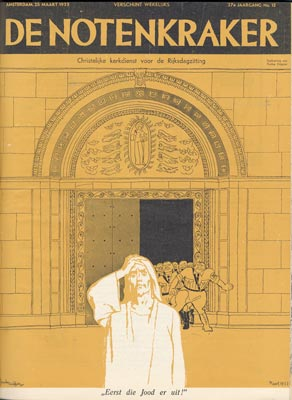
Cover by Albert Funke Küpper, March 25, 1933. Christian church service before Parliament session - first, out with the Jew"!

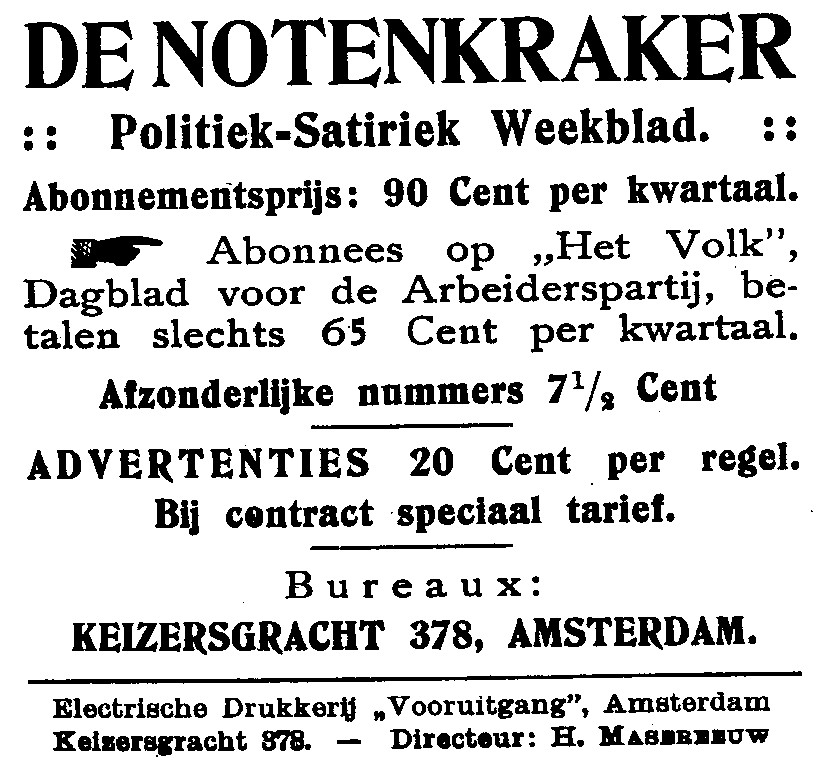
Advertisement for De Notenkraker

De Notenkraker (Dutch: "The Nutcracker") was a Dutch political and satirical weekly magazine published between 1907 and 1936.

In 1902, Het Zondagsblad appeared for the first time, as a Sunday supplement to the newspaper Het Volk of the Social Democratic Workers' Party (Dutch acronym: SDAP). In 1907, the supplement was renamed De Notenkraker. Unlike Het Volk, which contained mostly heavy political articles with few illustration, De Notenkraker featured many cartoons and other illustrations. Famous cartoonists from the early period of the periodical included Leendert Jordaan and Albert Hahn, senior. Hahn drew cartoons critical of the Dutch monarchy and Abraham Kuyper, who was Prime Minister from 1901 to 1905 and the founder of the Anti-Revolutionary Party.

Other contributors to De Notenkraker included Anton Kristians (pseudonym Toon Krias), and starting in 1920, the Belgian artist George Van Raemdonck.

Het Volk and De Notenkraker chiefly criticized the close relationship between the monarchy and the capitalist bourgeoisie. The monarchy was portrayed as a supporter of the ruling class, which did little to help the working classes.

As more socialist splinter groups appeared, such as the Communist Party of the Netherlands and the Independent Socialist Party, the periodicals also criticised groups on the left. By the beginning of World War 1 in 1914, many cartoons criticized militarism and war. Notably, Albert Hahn Sr. created powerful illustrations depicting the destruction caused by war. Hahn died before the end of the war in 1918. After that, De Notenkraker's quality went down noticeably, until the arrival of a new generation of illustrators in the 1930s.

At the end of 1918, De Notenkraker had about 8000 subscribers, compared to about 30,000 for Het Volk and almost 40,000 SDAP party members. A subscriptions to Het Volk at that time cost 0.20 guilders per week or 2.50 guilders (a rijksdaalder) per three months. A subscription including De Notenkraker cost 25 cents per week, or 3.50 guilders per three months, 4.15 guilders in the Dutch East Indies.

In 1919, A.M. de Jong became editor of Het Volk, and a year later he was made editor of art and serials as well. In 1922, he introduced as part of the paper, the massively popular illustrated series 'Bulletje en Boonestaak'. He wrote the text himself and George Van Raemdonck illustrated them. A.M. de Jong was also editor of De Notenkraker, for which he wrote the serial 'Het Verraad' ("Treason").

When Adolf Hitler became chancellor of Germany in 1933, German politics was dealt with on numerous covers and in numerous illustrations, and illustrated articles. Illustrators from this time included George Van Raemdonck, Tjerk Bottema, Jan Rot, Albert Hahn jr., Paul van Reen and Albert Funke Küpper. Funke Küpper became the driving force behind De Notenkraker starting in the 1920s. After his early death in 1934, the paper was discontinued; the last issue was in July 1936. After Funke Küpper's death other socialist publications became popular with more photographs such as Wij and the VARA Radio Guide.
