= Robert W. Farrell =

- Born: Isidore Katz; February 5, 1908 New York City, US
- Died: April 1, 1986 (aged 78) New York City, US
- Areas: Comic book writer; editor; publisher
- Pseudonyms: Bob Farrow; Bob Lerraf
- Notable works: Farrell Publications; Associated Features Syndicate

Robert W. Farrell, born Isidore Katz (February 5, 1908 – April 1, 1986) was an American comic book writer and editor. He was editor of the Farrell Publications.

== Career ==
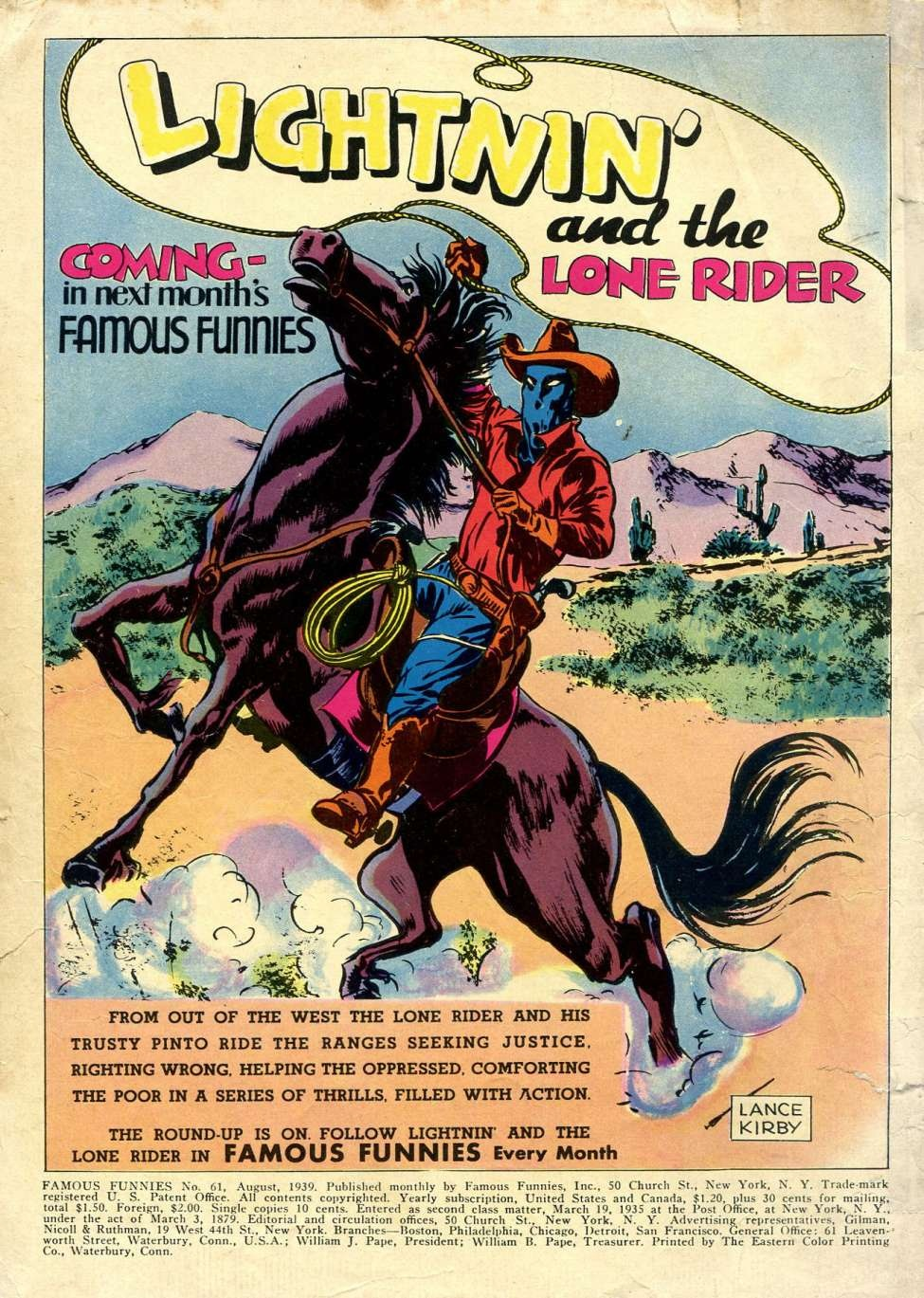
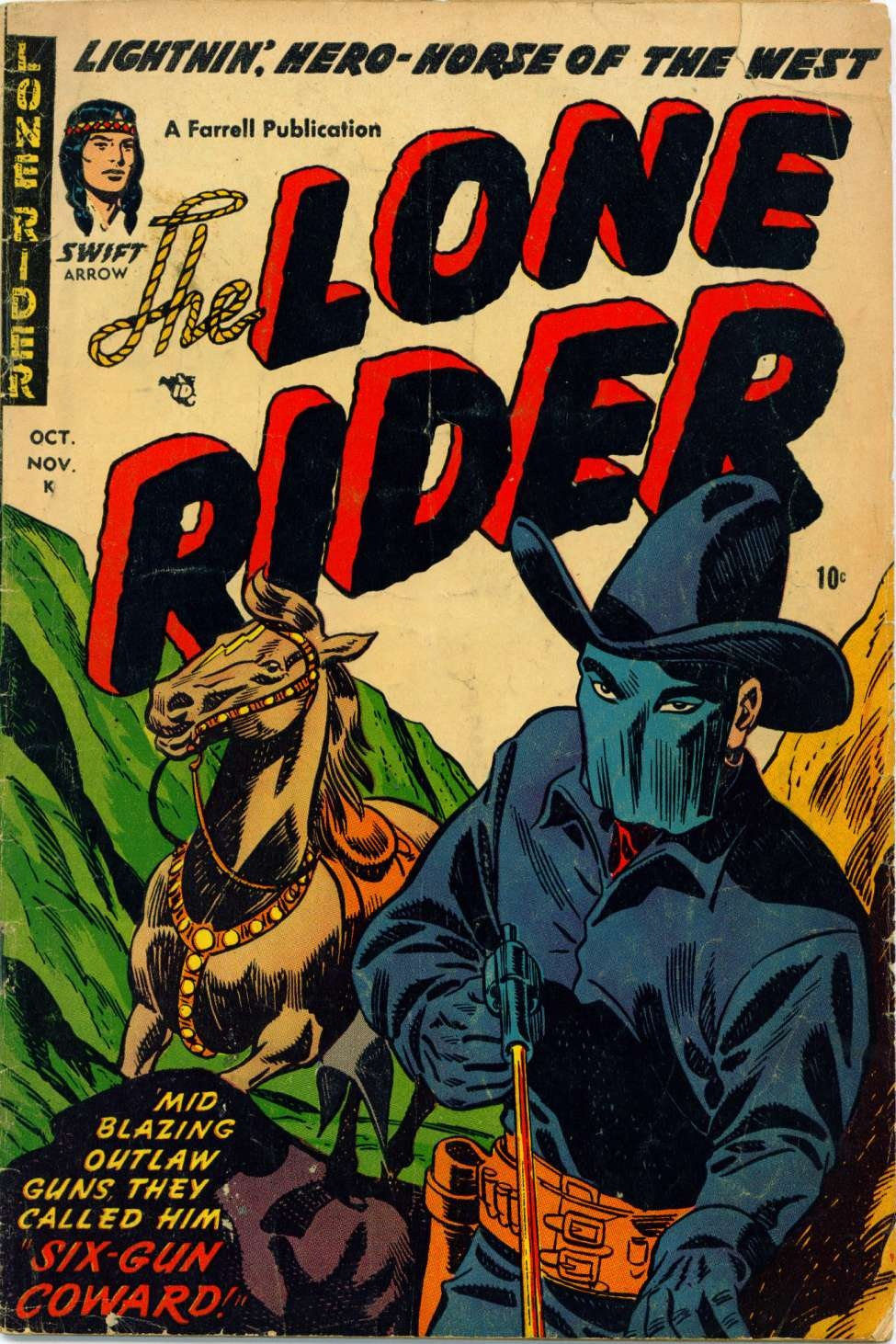
Two versions of The Lone Rider: one by Jack Kirby, published in Famous Funnies No. 61 (August 1939), and another with a cover by an unknown artist, released in October 1952 by Farrell Publications.

He entered the comics field in the late 1930s after a decade spent as an attorney. He wrote for the syndicated newspaper strips the western Lightnin’ and Lone Rider (which was illustrated by Jack Kirby and Frank Robbins) for his own syndication company, the Associated Features Syndicate. (These strips were later reprinted in Eastern Color Printing's Famous Funnies.) He also wrote Scorchy Smith for AP Newsfeatures, and comics stories for the packagers Eisner & Iger (sometimes using the names Bob Farrow and Bob Lerraf.) Farrell wrote many comics throughout the 1940s, though usually without attribution, as most stories produced during the period didn't contain credits.

In 1940, Farrell worked as an editor for Fox Comics. Together, Farrell and Fox publisher Victor S. Fox developed the Comicscope, a cheaply produced comic strip projector sold in the pages of Fox Comics.

After a short hiatus, Farrell founded the Farrell Comic Group in 1951 with the financial backing of Excellent Publications. Imprints included America's Best, Ajax Publications, Ajax-Farrell, Decker Publications, Red Top Comics, Steinway Comics, and World Famous. (Note: The company's comics usually bear an Ajax logo on the top left corner of the cover, and the words "A Farrell Publication" on the top right. Because of this, most comics historians tend to list Ajax-Farrell as a publisher rather than an imprint. Based upon a survey of the indicia of a number of comics bearing the Ajax logo, however, it seems clear that Ajax was an imprint of Excellent Publications, Inc., all overseen by founder/editor Robert W. Farrell.) No matter the imprint, most titles had the words "A Farrell Publication." Among its early launches, the company introduced a new version of the western hero Lone Rider in a self-titled comic book in 1951, which was illustrated by Jack Kamen. In 1957, the series was revived and streamlined under the new title The Rider.

In 1958, Farrell, under the auspices of "Health Publications," started the humor magazine Panic, not related to the EC Comics satire magazine published 1954–1955). Panic was published sporadically until 1959; and then possibly picked up by another publisher in 1965–1966.

Beginning in 1960, Farrell branched out into newspaper publishing. That year, he acquired the Brooklyn Eagle's assets in bankruptcy court, publishing five Sunday editions of the paper in 1960. In 1962–1963, under the corporate name Newspaper Consolidated Corporation, Farrell and his partner Philip Enciso briefly revived the Brooklyn Eagle as a daily. (The Brooklyn Eagle has since been revived again, publishing from 1996 to the present.) In 1971–1972, Farrell briefly revived the defunct New York Daily Mirror (in name only).

From 1969 to 1981, Farrell worked for Myron Fass, as publisher of the schlocky black-and-white horror magazine publisher Eerie Publications.
