= M. F. Enterprises =

Defunct comic books publisher

- Founded: 1966
- Founder: Myron Fass
- Defunct: 1974
- Country of origin: United States
- Headquarters location: New York City
- Key people: Carl Burgos
- Publication types: Comics, magazines
- Fiction genres: Superhero, teen humor, Western
- Imprints: Country-Wide Publications

M. F. Enterprises was a 1966–67 comic book publisher owned by artist and 1970s pulp-magazine entrepreneur Myron Fass, whose holdings also included the black-and-white horror comics magazine imprint Eerie Publications.

== Overview ==
M.F.'s best-known character was Captain Marvel (no relation to the Fawcett Comics, DC Comics or Marvel Comics superheroes of that name), a crimefighting alien android who could detach his head, limbs and hands and send them flying off in all directions whenever he shouted "Split!" and reattach them when he shouted "Xam!".

M. F. Enterprises also published Henry Brewster, a teen-humor comic created by artist Bob Powell, which ran for seven issues from February 1966 to September 1967. It followed the adventures and misadventures of the titular red-headed all-American teenager and his friends: the big, squeaky-voiced jock "Animal"; the brainy, bespectacled "Weenie"; and the beautiful Debbie and Melody. Their teacher was a former secret agent named Mr. Secrett, who was always happy to lend a handy gadget when needed.

Although the M. F. Enterprises brand stopped publishing comics in 1967, publisher Myron Fass continued to publish Great West magazine under the imprint, as well as with his Eerie Publications line of black-and-white mostly horror comic magazines until 1981.

== Titles published ==
- Captain Marvel (4 issues, April – November 1966)
- Captain Marvel Presents The Terrible Five (2 issues, August 1966 – September 1967) — Vol.1, No. 1 and Vol.2, No. 5 (continues the numbering of Captain Marvel)
- Great West (1966–1974) [Magazine]
- Henry Brewster (7 issues, February 1966 – September 1967)
