= Captain Marvel (M. F. Enterprises) =

Short-lived superhero published by M. F. Enterprises

- Captain Marvel #1, note also the ersatz version of "Plastic Man"

Publication information
- Publisher: M. F. Enterprises
- First appearance: Captain Marvel #1 (April 1966)
- Created by: Carl Burgos

In-story information
- Alter ego: Prof. Roger Winkle
- Species: Alien android
- Place of origin: Unnamed planet destroyed by nuclear war
- Team affiliations: Earth, Dartmoor University
- Partnerships: Billy Baxton (kid sidekick), Tinyman (D.A. Jack Baker), Linda Knowles (girlfriend)
- Notable aliases: The Human Robot, Mr. Marvel
- Abilities: Can split off body parts and have them perform separate tasks; Superhuman Strength, Speed, Durability, and Intelligence; Laser-vision; Flight; Force Fields; Sonic Blasts; Radar-hearing; Can mentally alter internal mechanisms to do anything from breathing underwater to time travel

Captain Marvel was a superhero published by Myron Fass' short-lived M. F. Enterprises. The character is unrelated to those published by Fawcett Comics, DC Comics, or Marvel Comics and only appeared in a few comics in the late 1960s before legal challenges shut down the publisher.

The character was an alien android who arrived on planet Earth as a refugee, fleeing the nuclear warfare which destroyed his home planet. In his secret identity, he worked as a university professor and attempted to raise a legal ward as a single father.

== Publication history ==
Captain Marvel lasted for four issues (cover-dated April–Nov. 1966). It was followed by two issues of Captain Marvel Presents the Terrible Five, numbered #1 and #5 (Sept. 1966 and Sept. 1967).

== Fictional character biography ==
Captain Marvel was a jet-booted and laser-eyed alien android powered by an "M"-emblemed medallion who had been sent to Earth by his creators as a refugee, in order to escape the destruction of their war-ravaged planet by nuclear warfare.

Vowing to protect the peace of his new home, the self-proclaimed "Human Robot" took the secret identity of journalist turned Dartmoor University professor Roger Winkle in the city of Riverview, United States where he lived with his young ward Billy Baxton, the first person he met when he arrived on Earth and the only one who knew his true origins.

== Powers and weaknesses ==
Captain Marvel possessed superhuman strength, speed and senses (including something called "radar-hearing") and the ability to fly thanks to his jet-heeled Astro-Boots that enabled him to hurtle through sky and space at fantastic speeds.

His super-durable robotic body was equipped with advanced alien technology that, among other things, allowed him to generate force fields and sonic blasts and to shoot metal-melting laser beams out of his eyes. He also had a super-intelligent computer brain programmed with the scientific knowledge of two worlds that could alter his internal mechanisms to do anything from breathe underwater to travel through time.

Captain Marvel's signature ability, however, was the power to detach his head, limbs and hands and send them flying off in all directions whenever he shouted "Split!" and reattach them when he shouted "Xam!"

Despite these impressive talents (which also included the handy trick of being able to make his outer clothing disappear and reappear at will), he was by no means invulnerable.

He had to remember to rub his energy-giving amulet once every twenty-four hours in order to recharge his system or else he would start to lose important functions like memory and mobility.

Glass barriers and electronic interference could prevent him from reassembling himself, and his metallic structure meant he could be attracted and held by powerful magnets. What's more his synthetic body parts were made of materials not available on Earth and could not be replaced if lost or destroyed.

However his real vulnerability, if it could be called that, was that he was built by his creators to think and react like a human being. He was capable of empathy, compassion and curiosity but also of making all too human mistakes. Possessing the full range of human emotions including the ability to fall in love, due to some sort of innate inferiority complex he felt he was unworthy of anything more than a platonic relationship with a woman because he was "only a robot."

== Antagonists ==
Captain Marvel's villains included characters who resembled other publishers' characters, or whose names were actually already in use by other publishers.

The super-stretchable master of disguise Plastic Man (see Plastic Man), an evil alien from the planet Venus, was renamed Elasticman after his first appearance.

The bristly-mustached mad scientist Dr. Fate (see Doctor Fate) was torn between a desire for revenge and his obsession with learning the electronic secrets of the android he called a "human thingamajig". Having first faced off against Captain Marvel before the hero had started wearing a mask to protect his identity, Fate soon noticed the strong resemblance between his alien adversary and the mild-mannered Prof. Winkle and came to the obvious conclusion that they were one and the same person, but he quickly discovered that proving it was a whole other matter.

Winged masked magician, hypnotist and megalomaniacal mastermind the Bat visually resembled Batman enough to prompt a response from DC Comics attorneys threatening to sue for plagiarism. The character's name was changed to the Ray (not to be confused with the Quality Comics character) along with the addition of a lightning bolt emblem on his chest.

Other characters were only somewhat less legally contentious. The handsome Prof. Doom of the subversive organization B.I.R.D. (Bureau of International Revolutionary Devices) secretly performed on-campus mind control experiments which endangered Prof. Winkle's tentative relationship with the university president's daughter Linda Knowles. Colonel Cold was a bioterrorist who secretly hid capsules containing a deadly virus in ballpoint pens and distributed them throughout the city. Tarzac, the bald and green-gilled "King of the Sharks", rode a giant seahorse and protected a secret undersea fortress. Nuclear physicist turned metal-mouthed pirate Atom-Jaw could bite through solid steel.

However Captain Marvel's true nemesis, the only foe he actually "hated" (because he was pre-programmed to by his makers), was the Destroyer (no relation to the Marvel Comics character). An android like himself, the skullcap-clad Destroyer was a burly and literally fiery-eyed weapon of mass destruction who, in addition to being virtually indestructible and able to fly through the vast depths of space, could shoot devastating blasts of flame out of the yellow circle on his chest and had magnetic hands designed to grapple with his metal-bodied foe. Created by the enemy Volcano People of the hero's home planet, the Destroyer also escaped the death of their world and was now allied with Earth's own hostile subterranean race.

And then there was Tinyman, a miniature human being who, in an inversion of Ant-Man and the Atom's powers, could grow to normal adult male size and quickly shrink back down again. Working as circus sideshow freak when not engaged in illegal activities, the white-haired, blue and black-clad Tinyman eventually tired of his sordid lifestyle and reformed with the help of Captain Marvel and his alter ego Prof. Winkle, taking the name Jack Baker and going back to school to get his law degree, eventually becoming the local district attorney.

== Other appearances ==
The M. F. Enterprises version of Captain Marvel made a cameo appearance, along with other alternate versions of Captain Marvel, in issue #27 of DC Comics' The Power of Shazam! (1997). The character is shown performing his trademark division trick while wearing the traditional thunderbolt costume of Fawcett Comics' Captain Marvel.

A strikingly similar if more darkly humorous superhero was Mort Todd and Daniel Clowes's the Divisible Man who appeared in issues of Lloyd Llewellyn and Anything Goes! back in the eighties and was, according to Todd, an attempt to create a character as "nuttily visual" as Jack Cole's original Plastic Man.
