= Albert Hahn =

Dutch caricaturist

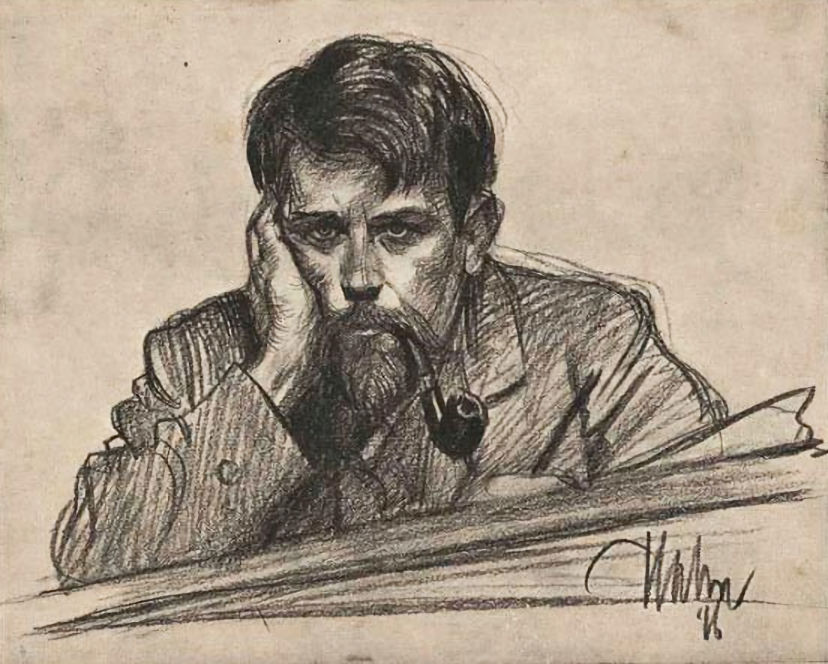
- Self-portrait with Pipe
- Born: Albert Pieter Hahn; 17 March 1877; Groningen, Netherlands
- Died: 3 August 1918 (aged 41); Watergraafsmeer, Netherlands

Albert Pieter Hahn (17 March 1877 – 3 August 1918) was a Dutch political cartoonist, caricaturist, poster artist and book cover designer; well known for his socialist and antimilitaristic viewpoints. Some of his drawings, especially those of the railroad strikes of 1903, have been regularly used in history textbooks. His adopted son, Albert Hahn jr., was also an artist, so he is sometimes referred to as "Sr.".

== Biography ==
He was born to a poor family; what he would later describe as "respectable poverty". His father painted signs and glass and made frames. Although his mother and sisters were members of the Mennonite church, his father was anticlerical. Both of his brothers were members of the labor movement.

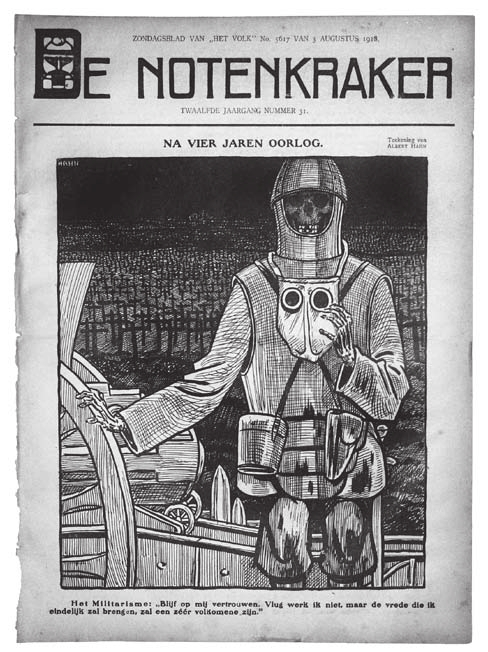
Hahn's last cover illustration.

At the age of nine, he developed tuberculosis in his vertebrae and could not finish school. At the age of twelve, when his condition had improved somewhat, he was apprenticed to his father. A few years later, he enrolled at the Academie Minerva. His training there was interrupted by a recurrence of his disease, which forced him to spend two years in a hospital. At seventeen, he returned to the Academie.

In 1896, he saw the works of Van Gogh at an exhibition in Groningen, which had a deep and permanent effect on his style. That same year, thanks to a government grant, he enrolled at the "Teekenschool voor Kunstambachten" in Amsterdam and, after graduating, became a drawing teacher at a technical school.

It was then that his growing interest in socialism led him to join the Social Democratic Workers' Party (SDAP). One of his first projects as a member involved a study of the housing situation in Amsterdam. The result was a 100-page booklet called "Krotten en Sloppen" (Shacks and Slums), published in 1901, with his drawings.

The following year, Het Volk, a socialist newspaper, held a contest to find an artist for their weekly Sunday supplement. Hahn was selected and signed to a permanent contract. Soon, he began creating political cartoons in addition to illustrations; for De Notenkraker as well as Het Volk, and was able to quit his teaching job in 1905. After the beginning of World War I, his works dealt almost exclusively with denouncing the needless death and destruction.

Although he had occasional serious relapses, in 1911 he married the recently divorced Iemkje Dijkman, adopted her two sons, and had two daughters. In 1918, just before the end of the war, he succumbed to his disease. Over his career, he produced more than 4,000 drawings. A major retrospective of his work was held at the Nederlands Persmuseum in 2000.

== Selected posters ==
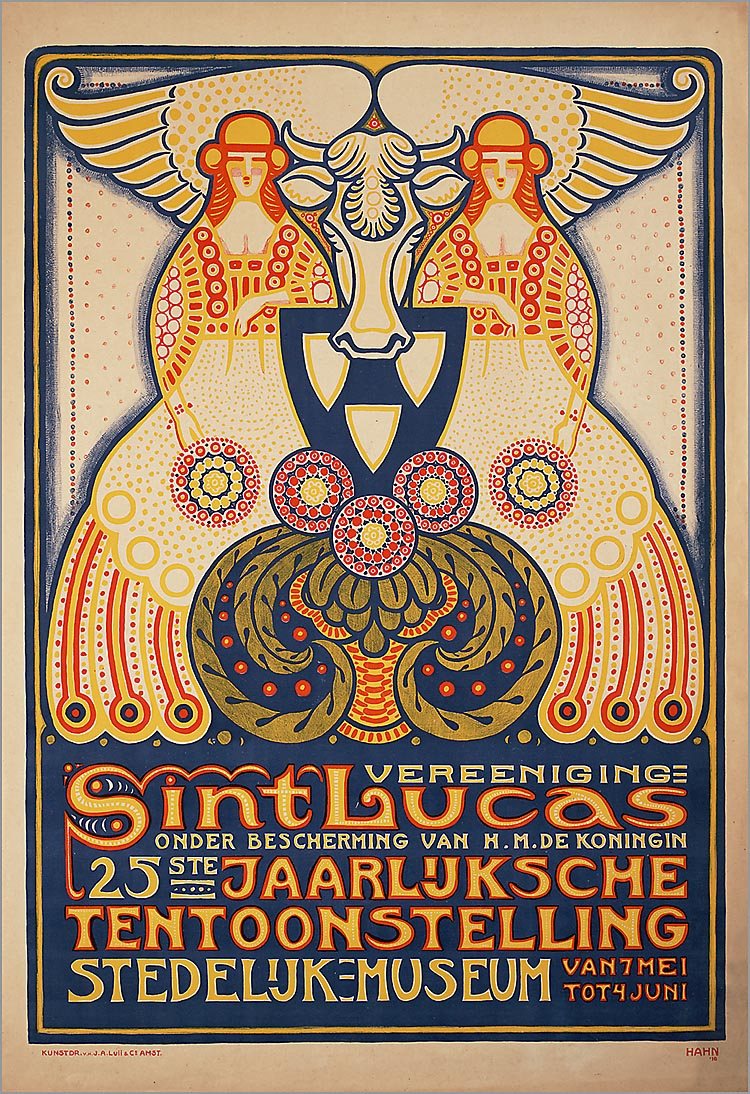
Exhibition at the Stedelijk Museum (1916)

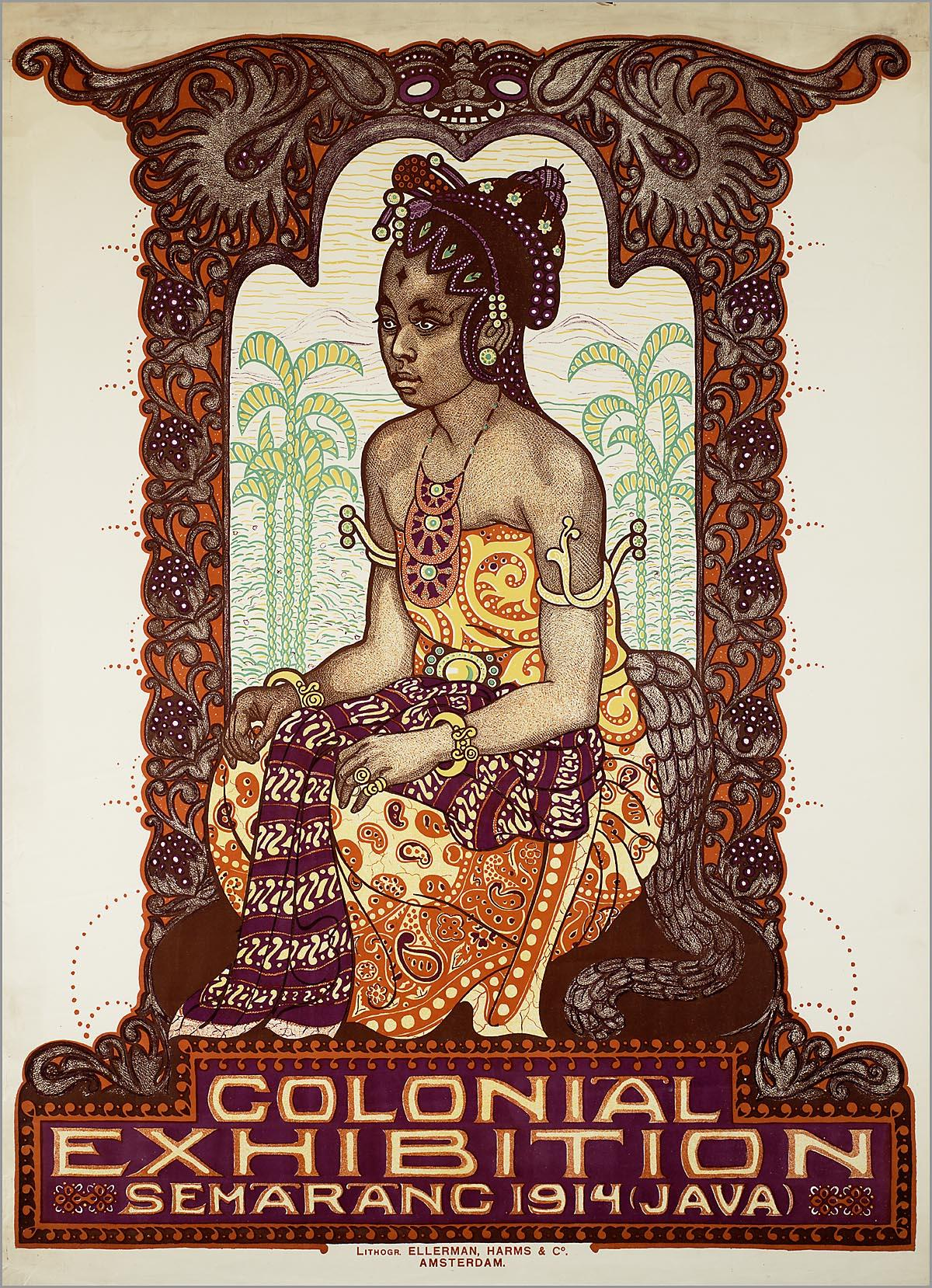
The Colonial Exhibition of Semarang (1914)

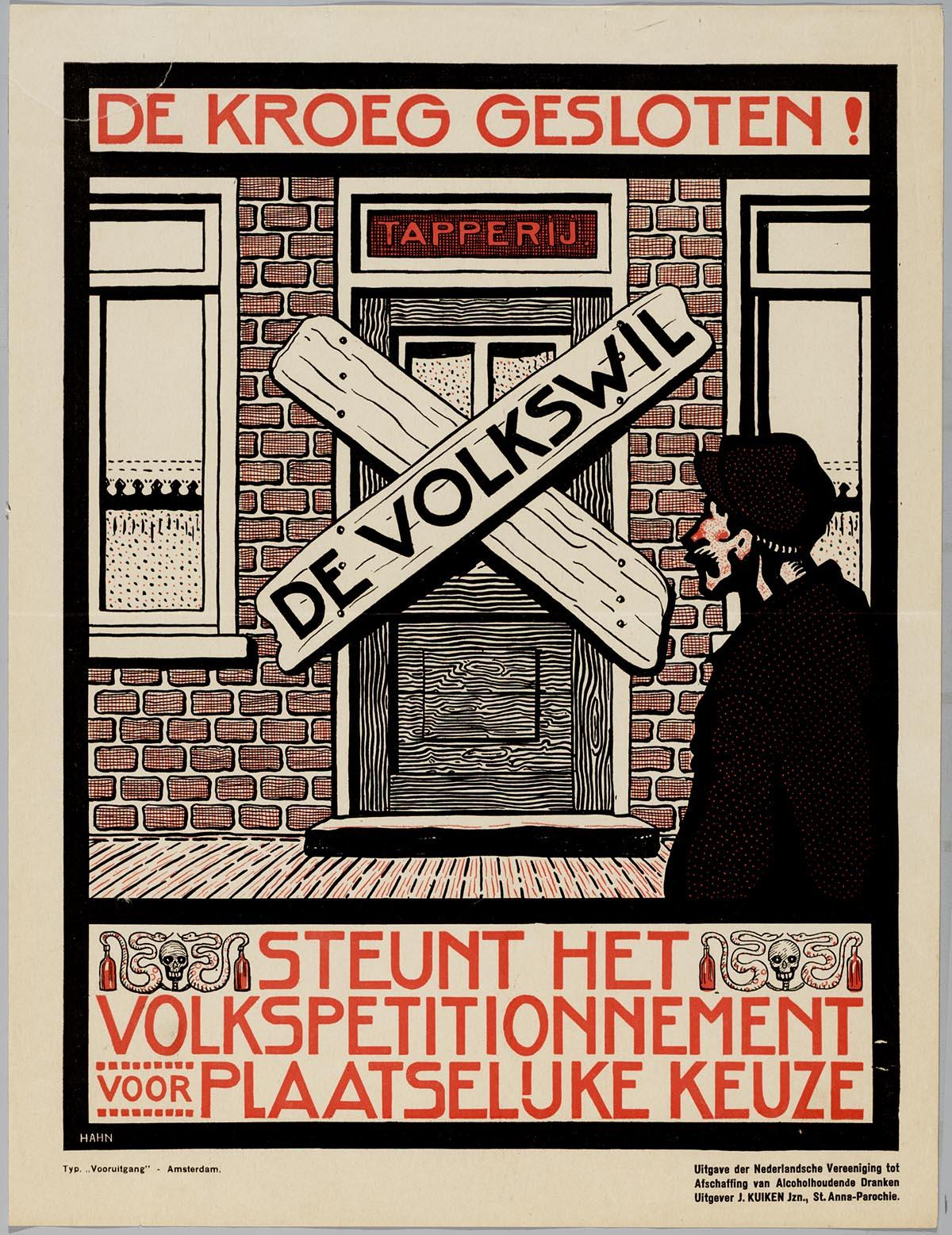
"The Pub is Closed", anti-alcoholism campaign (1913)

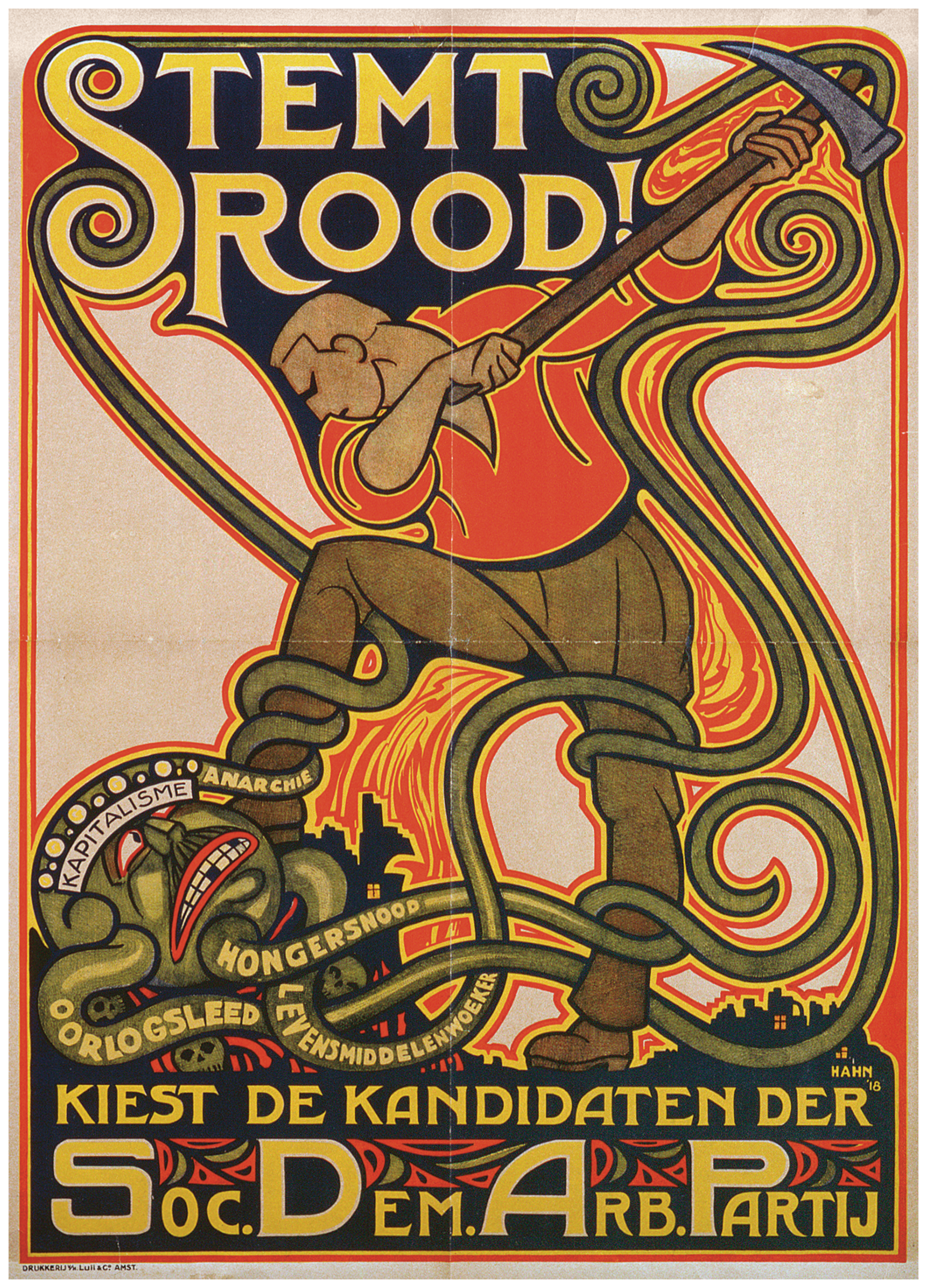
"Vote Red", for the SDAP (1918)

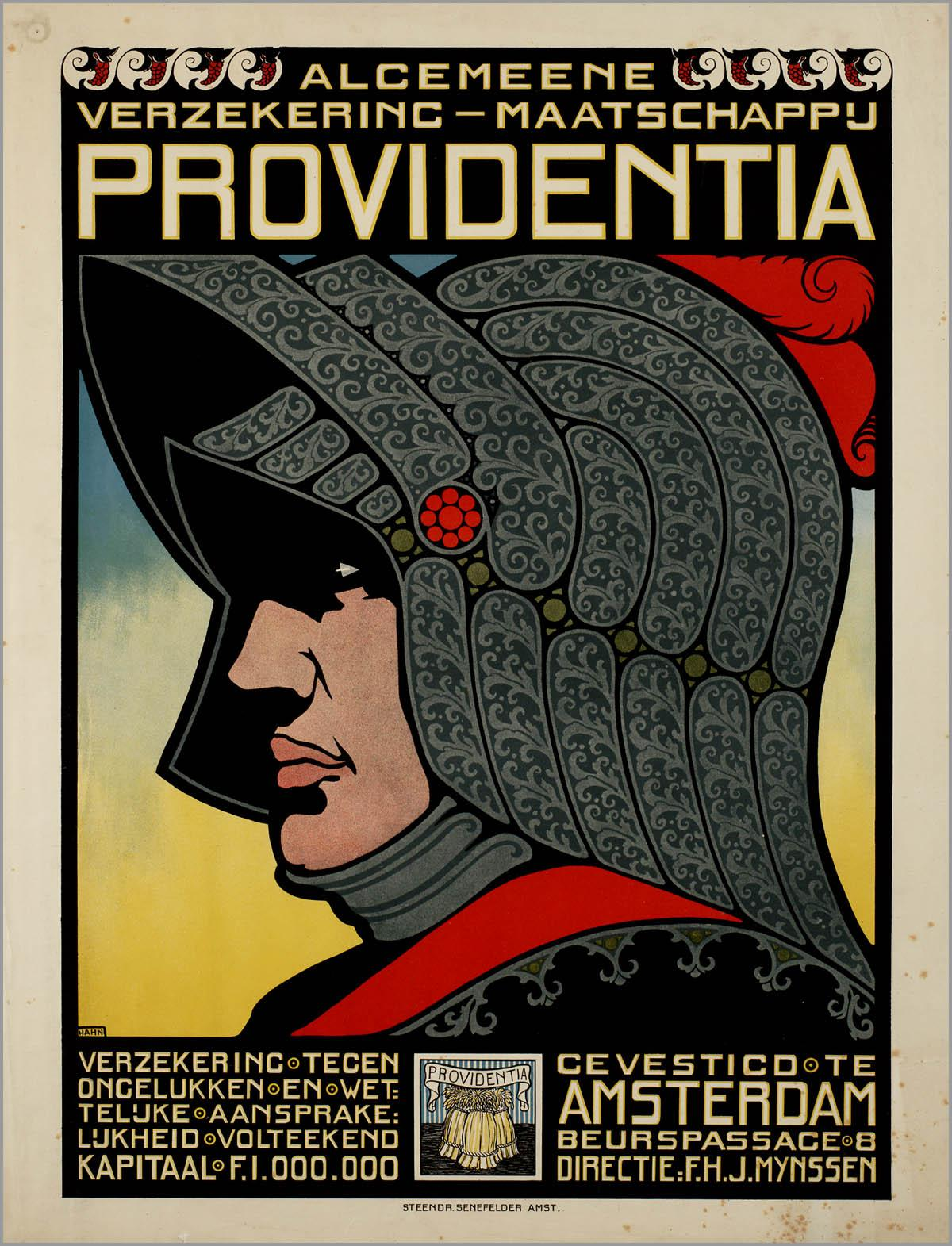
Providentia insurance company (1900)
