= Tjerk Bottema =

Dutch painter

Tjerk Bottema (4 March 1882 – 1940) was a Dutch painter and editorial cartoonist.

== Biography ==
At age 14, Bottema was sent to the Rijkskweekschool in Maastricht where he studied drawing. Later he studied at the Rijksakademie van Beeldende Kunsten, where Art Nouveau was the dominant style. During this time Bottema also started drawing advertisements, an activity that would later make him famous. In 1909 he has his first major success with the painting “Maaiers”, one year later he won the prestigious Prix de Rome. During World War I he visited the Western Front to make an illustrated report for the newspaper De Amsterdammer. After the war he settled in Paris, finding a job writing travel reports for De Notenkraker. When in 1940 the German army approached Paris Bottema decided to leave France, but died when his ship was sunk by a German U-boat.
