= Carl Burgos =

American cartoonist

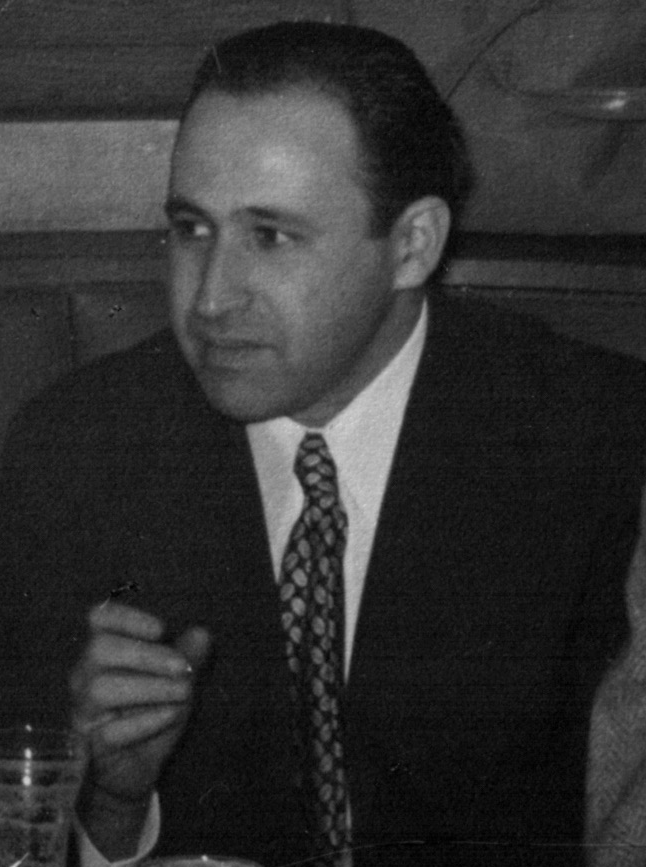
- Burgos in 1950
- Born: Max Finkelstein; April 18, 1916 New York City, New York, U.S.
- Died: March 1984 (aged 67) Nassau County, New York, U.S.
- Areas: Penciller, Artist
- Notable works: Original Human Torch
- Awards: Jack Kirby Hall of Fame (1996)

Carl Burgos (/ˈbɜːrɡoʊs/ BUR-gohss; born Max Finkelstein /ˈfɪŋkəlstiːn/ FING-kəl-steen; April 18, 1916 – March 1984) was an American comic book and advertising artist best known for creating the original Human Torch in Marvel Comics #1 (Oct. 1939), during the period historians and fans call the Golden Age of comic books.

He was inducted into comic books' Jack Kirby Hall of Fame in 1996.

== Biography ==
=== Early life ===
Carl Burgos was born as Max Finkelstein in New York City, the child of Jewish parents. He studied at the National Academy of Design in Manhattan, where, he recalled in the late 1960s, "I quit after one year because I couldn't learn enough".

=== Early career ===
Burgos took a job with the Franklin Engraving Company, which engraved the printing plates for comic books produced by Harry "A" Chesler, founder of one of that era's comic-book "packagers" that created comics on demand for publishers entering the new medium. Joining Chesler's studio himself in 1938, Burgos apprenticed by drawing backgrounds and panel borders, and inking the work of comics pencilers. His earliest works include penciling and inking the six-page story "The Last Pirate", starring Count Rocco and his ship the Emerald Queen, in Centaur Publications' Star Comics vol. 2, #2 (March 1939); creating the features "Air-Sub DX", in Centaur's Amazing Mystery Funnies vol. 2, #4 (April 1939), and "Rocky Dawson"; and creating the robot hero the Iron Skull in Centaur's Amazing-Man Comics #5 (Sept. 1939).

Burgos and others, including Centaur Publications writer-artist Bill Everett, then followed Centaur art director Lloyd Jacquet to Jacquet's own newly formed packager, Funnies, Inc. As Everett later described, "Lloyd... had an idea that he wanted to start his own art service — to start a small organization to supply artwork and editorial material to publishers. ... He asked me to join him. He also asked Carl Burgos. So we were the nucleus ..." He added, "I don't know how to explain it, but I was still on a freelance basis. That was the agreement we had. The artists, including myself, at Funnies, worked on a freelance basis".

Following an unsuccessful attempt at a promotional comic to be given away in movie theaters, Funnies, Inc.'s first sale was to publisher Martin Goodman's equally new Timely Comics, the predecessor of Marvel Comics, supplying the contents of Marvel Comics #1 (Oct. 1939). That landmark issue included not only writer-artist Burgos' Human Torch but also Everett's hit character the Sub-Mariner. A painted cover by veteran science-fiction pulp artist Frank R. Paul featured the Torch.

Burgos' character proved a hit, and quickly went on to headline one of comics' first single-character titles, The Human Torch (premiering fall 1940 with no cover date and as issue #2, having taken over the numbering from the single-issue Red Raven). He next created the superhero character the White Streak in Novelty Press' Target Comics #1 (Feb. 1940), and, with writer John Compton, the superhero the Thunderer in Timely's Daring Mystery Comics #7 (April 1941).

Burgos left for World War II military service in 1942, starting in the U.S. Army Air Corps, for which he took infantry ranger training and was sent overseas as a rifleman before being transferred to the Signal Corps and then to an engineer division.

=== Atlas and the 1950s ===
Following his return from the war, Burgos attended City College of New York to study advertising, and drew a small number of stories for Timely, including anthological crime dramas in Official True Crime Cases Comics #24 (Fall 1947), and Complete Mystery #3–4 (Dec. 1948 – Feb. 1949). Other work included penciling a Captain America story in Marvel Mystery Comics #92 (June 1949), and inking fellow Timely mainstays Mike Sekowsky and Syd Shores on, respectively, at least one story each starring Sun Girl and the Blonde Phantom (both in Marvel Mystery Comics #89, Dec. 1948). Segueing out of full-time comics work, Burgos eased into a career in advertising and commercial art while freelancing frequently for Atlas Comics, the 1950s iteration of Marvel, primarily as a cover artist across all genres from jungle-girl to war comics, though fellow Atlas artist Stan Goldberg, who joined the company in 1949, recalled in 2002 that "Burgos was on staff most of the time I was there".

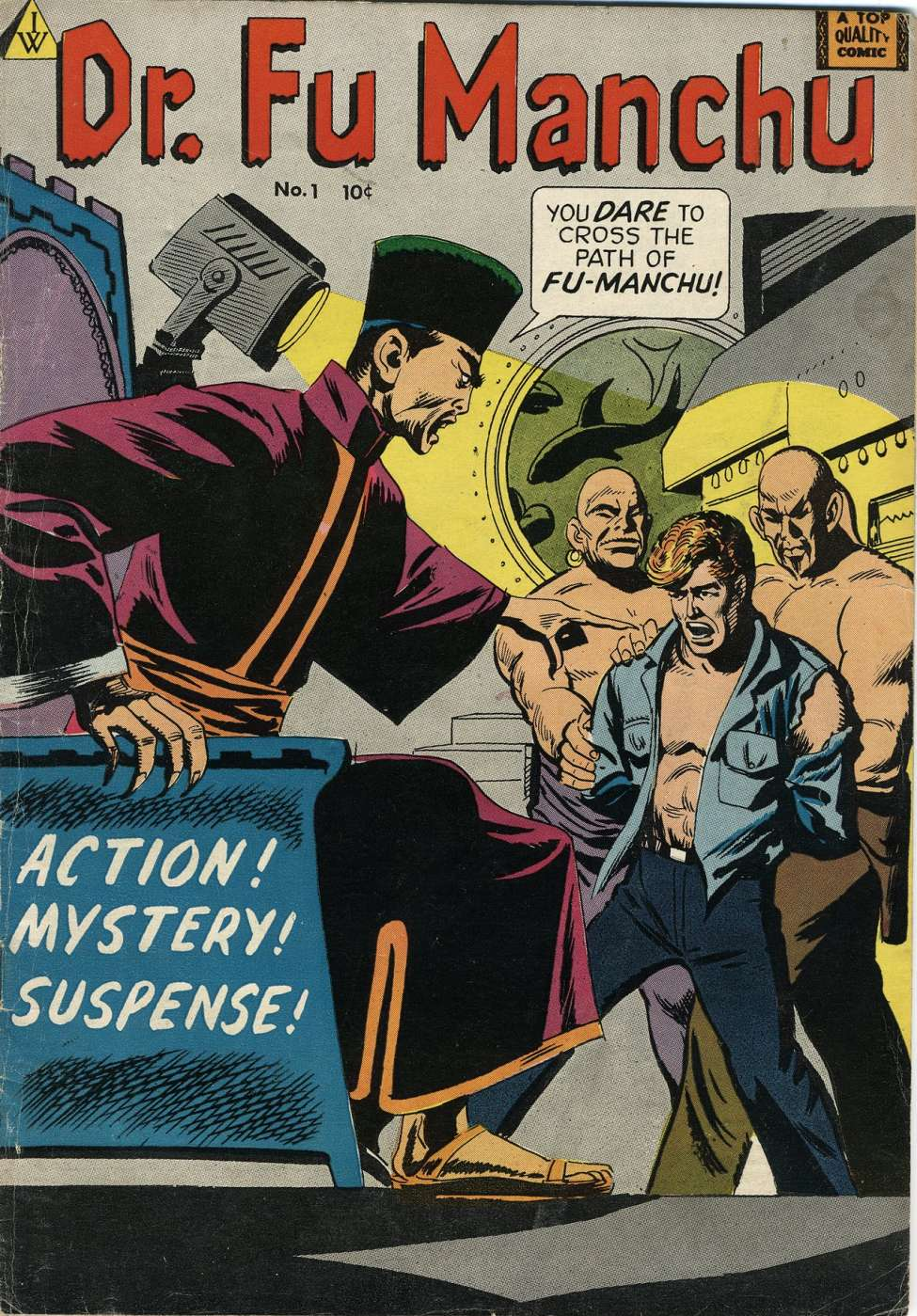
I.W. Publications' Dr. Fu Manchu #1 (1958), reprinting material from Avon Comics. Cover art by Burgos.

His most prominent comics work during this time came during Atlas' mid-1950s attempt at reviving the dormant superhero field with Timely stars the Human Torch, the Sub-Mariner, and Captain America, with Burgos drawing the Human Torch stories in Young Men #25–28 (Feb.–June 1954), as well as the covers of Young Men #24–25 (Dec. 1953 – Feb. 1954) and of the short-lived relaunch Human Torch #36–38 (April–Aug. 1954); he also redrew at least the Human Torch figure in the first panel of artist Russ Heath's nine-page story "The Return Of The Human Torch" in Young Men #24. Burgos during the '50s also contributed to the Atlas humor comics Crazy, Wild, and Riot; the Western comic Annie Oakley; and science-fiction/horror anthologies, including Astonishing, Journey Into Unknown Worlds, Strange Stories of Suspense and Strange Tales of the Unusual, “Haunted Thrills”, among many others. His last credited Atlas story was the five-page "Dateline - Iwo Jima" in Battle #70 (June 1960).

He did humor for Pierce Publishing's Frantic, Satire Publications' Loco, and Major Magazines' Cracked during 1958 and 1959, as well as layout art for the MLJ/Archie Comics series The Adventures of The Fly and The Double Life of Private Strong. Burgos also provided illustrations for Marvel publisher Martin Goodman's 1950s pulp magazines, including Marvel Science Stories and Western Magazine; as well as covers for the reprint publisher I.W. Publications.

During the late 1950s and early 1960s, Burgos worked for the Pro-Art Company and later for the Belwin Company, where he drew covers for sheet-music books, sometimes assisted by Susan Burgos, one of his two daughters. He also worked for a greeting-card company.

=== Silver Age and afterward ===
In the mid-1960s, during the era fans and historians call the Silver Age of Comic Books, Burgos pursued a lawsuit against Marvel to assert ownership of the Human Torch, whose name and superpowers had been used for the Fantastic Four's Johnny Storm since 1961. Little, if anything, came of this legal action. Burgos nonetheless contributed art to a Johnny Storm Human Torch story in Strange Tales #123 (Aug. 1964), as well as to three Giant-Man stories in Tales to Astonish #62–64 (Dec. 1964 – Feb. 1965). Burgos drew himself and writer-editor Stan Lee into the final panel of the Torch story, with Lee adding the avuncular dialog:

Stan (referring to the Torch and the Thing): "There go the greatest guys in the world, Carl."
Carl: "Aw, you're just prejudiced, Stan."

Fellow Atlas/Marvel artist Stan Goldberg observed in 2005, "Carl and Stan never really got along, because their personalities clashed. When Atlas became Marvel, Carl never really got back into the company, or really into comics, either".

Marvel eventually revived Burgos' original Human Torch for present-day stories, starting with The Fantastic Four Annual #4 (Nov. 1966). That same year, Burgos created a short-lived character called Captain Marvel for Myron Fass' M. F. Enterprises as a result of Fawcett Comics losing its trademark. He was quickly ordered to cease by Marvel Comics. His last recorded comics art was the cover of Captain Marvel #4 (Nov. 1966).

From 1971 to 1975, Burgos served as an editor for Fass' Eerie Publications line of black-and-white horror-comic magazines, including Horror Tales, Weird, Tales from the Tomb, Tales of Voodoo, Terror Tales, Weird, and Witches Tales. Through 1984 he edited magazines for Harris Publications. At the time of his death from colon cancer, he lived in Nassau County, New York, on Long Island.
