= Myron Fass =

American publisher (1926–2006)

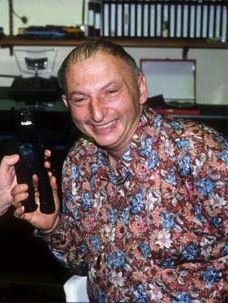
- Born: March 29, 1926 Brooklyn, New York, U.S.
- Died: September 14, 2006 (aged 80) Fort Lauderdale, Florida, U.S.
- Areas: Artist, Publisher
- Pseudonym: Chief Merion Riley-Foss
- Notable works: Tempest Publications; National Mirror, Inc. Countrywide Publications; M. F. Enterprises; Eerie Publications; CFV Publishers; Creative Arts
- Collaborators: Jeff Goodman

Myron Fass (March 29, 1926 – September 14, 2006) was an American publisher of pulp magazines and comic books, operating from the 1950s through the 1990s under a multitude of company names, including M. F. Enterprises and Eerie Publications. At his height in the 1970s, Fass was known as the biggest multi-title newsstand magazine publisher in the country. He put out up to fifty titles a month, many of them one-offs, covering any subject matter he thought would sell, from soft-core pornography to professional wrestling, UFOs to punk rock, horror films to firearm magazines.

== Biography ==
=== Early life ===
Fass was born in Brooklyn, New York, the son of an Orthodox Jewish laborer.

=== Comics artist ===
Starting in 1948 and until the mid-1950s shrinkage of the industry initiated by the institution of the Comics Code, Fass illustrated horror, crime, romance, Western, and other comics for a multitude of publishers, including Ace Periodicals, Avon Comics, Charlton Comics, Fawcett Comics, Feature Comics, Fox Comics, Lev Gleason Publications, Magazine Enterprises, Marvel Comics, Story Comics, Street & Smith Comics, and Trojan Comics. Fass produced some of this material with the S. M. Iger Studio from 1949–1953. For Toby Press, Fass was a regular artist on Dr. Anthony King, Hollywood Love Doctor, Great Lover Romances, John Wayne Adventure Comics, Tales of Horror, and War.

=== Publisher ===
In 1956, Fass packaged the Whitestone Publishing title Lunatickle, one of the first imitators of EC's Mad magazine. (Fass was a huge admirer of EC publisher William Gaines.) The girlie magazine Foto-Rama and the monster magazine Shock Tales soon followed.

Backed by William Harris, who invented the Harris Press (still used today), by the beginning of the 1960s Fass was publishing his own material under the company name Tempest Publications. It was during this period that Fass launched the pin-up girlie mags Pic, Buccaneer, Poorboy, and Jaguar. Other Tempest publications were the "newspaper magazine" Quick, Companion, and the over-the-top tabloid National Mirror. Al Goldstein worked for Fass in 1968 before starting Screw magazine, writing for the National Mirror, the new tabloid Hush-Hush News, and the digest-sized girlie titles Pic and Bold.

In 1966 William Harris's son Stanley R. Harris partnered with Fass to form the black-and-white horror magazine publisher Eerie Publications. Eerie's output was a low-rent response to the popularity of the Warren Publishing horror comic magazines Creepy and Eerie. Fass's titles, all of which featured grisly, lurid color covers, included Weird, Horror Tales, Terror Tales, Tales from the Tomb, Tales of Voodoo, and Witches' Tales. Fass's brother Irving worked as an art director, and an old collaborator from the Iger studio days, Robert W. Farrell, had the title of publisher.

Eerie stayed in business until 1981, although co-owner Harris left in 1976 after a series of disputes with the mercurial Fass. Harris immediately went on to form the consumer magazine publisher Harris Publications.

Also in 1966, Fass formed M. F. Enterprises, a four-color comic publisher whose main product was Captain Marvel, a short-lived attempt by Golden Age cartoonist Carl Burgos, to revive the long-dormant Fawcett Comics superhero in slightly different form. M. F. Enterprises also published an Archie-style teen humor comic and a western series. M. F. Enterprises only published comics for two years, though Fass continued to use the company name for his magazines.

In the 1970s, under the company name Countrywide Publications, Fass began producing more one-shots and pushing even further the boundaries of good taste, with magazines on such topics as the Kennedy assassination, Elvis Presley's death, and the shooting of Hustler publisher Larry Flynt. As such, Fass was responsible for almost every bottom-of-the barrel publication to come out in the decade. If any sleaze or exploitation magazine was successful enough, his company would imitate it — often multiple times. If anybody was famous, he published a quickie magazine to cash in on their fame. Fass's standard of success was 20,000 copies sold per issue. During this period, Fass was known to wear a loaded gun to work. He lived in New Jersey with his wife Phyllis and an assortment of luxury automobiles.

By the mid-1980s Fass had become increasingly erratic, both in his behavior and publishing output. He moved to Ocala, Florida, where he ran a gun shop and continued to publish (mostly firearm-related) magazines. During this period, Fass published under the name CFV Publishers and called himself "Chief Merion Riley-Foss." His son David worked with him.

In the mid-1990s, Fass and his son David were still in Florida publishing gun magazines and other titles under the company name Creative Arts. According to former employee Jeff Goodman, by this time Fass was showing signs of paranoia and would not talk to anyone.

=== Death ===
Fass died in 2006, in Fort Lauderdale, Florida.

== Tributes ==
Kurt Busiek's Astro City series features an homage to Fass in its Fass Gardens location.

== Titles published ==
=== Comic books and magazines ===
- Captain Marvel (1966)
- Captain Marvel Presents the Terrible 5 (1966)
- Gasm (5 issues, 1977–1978) — Heavy Metal knockoff
- Horror Tales (1969–1979)
- Tales from the Tomb (1969–1975)
- Tales of Voodoo (1968–1974)
- Terror Tales (1969–1979) — revival of 1930s pulp magazine published by Popular Publications
- Weird (1966–1981)
- Witches' Tales (1969–1975)

=== Crime ===
- Homicide Detective
- Murder Squad Detective
- Son of Sam
- The World of Sherlock Holmes
- True Sex Crimes

=== Firearms ===
- .44 Mag / .44 and Magnum
- GunPro (launched mid-1980s)
- Shooting Bible
- Shotgun Journal
- USA Guns (launched mid-1980s)

=== Men's magazines ===
- Bold
- Brute
- Buccaneer
- Companion
- Flick
- Jaguar
- Pic
- Poorboy

=== Monster magazines ===
- Shock Tales (launched 1959)
- Thriller (3 issues, 1962)

=== Movies and TV ===
- Movie Lies
- Movie TV Secrets
- PhotoTV Land
- TV Photo Story

=== Music ===
- Acid Rock
- Fourteen
- Fifteen Fever
- 15 Fever
- Groupie Rock
- Hard Rock
- Led Zep
- Pop Rock Special
- Punk Rock
- Rock
- Rock 79
- Rock Awards
- Rock Fever Awards
- Rock Gossip
- Rock Groupie
- Rock Mania
- Rockworld
- Rock'N Roll Special
- Rock Spectacular
- Rock Star
- Super Rock
- Super Rock Awards
- Super Rock Spectacular

=== Tabloids ===
- Hush-Hush News (launched 1968) — same title as 1950s-1960s gossip magazine
- National Mirror (1964–1973)

=== UFOs ===
- Ancient Astronauts
- Clones
- Close Encounters of the Fourth Kind
- ESP
- Official UFO
- Space Trek
- Space Wars
- Star Warp

=== Misc. ===
- Confidential Report / Confidential Sex Report
- GadgetWorld
- Hall of Fame Wrestling
- Official American Horseman
- People Today
- Predictions
- Private Confessions of Doctors and Nurses
- Quick (launched 1964)
- Show Dogs
- True War
- Uncensored — scandal magazine
