= George Van Raemdonck =

Belgian comics artist and painter

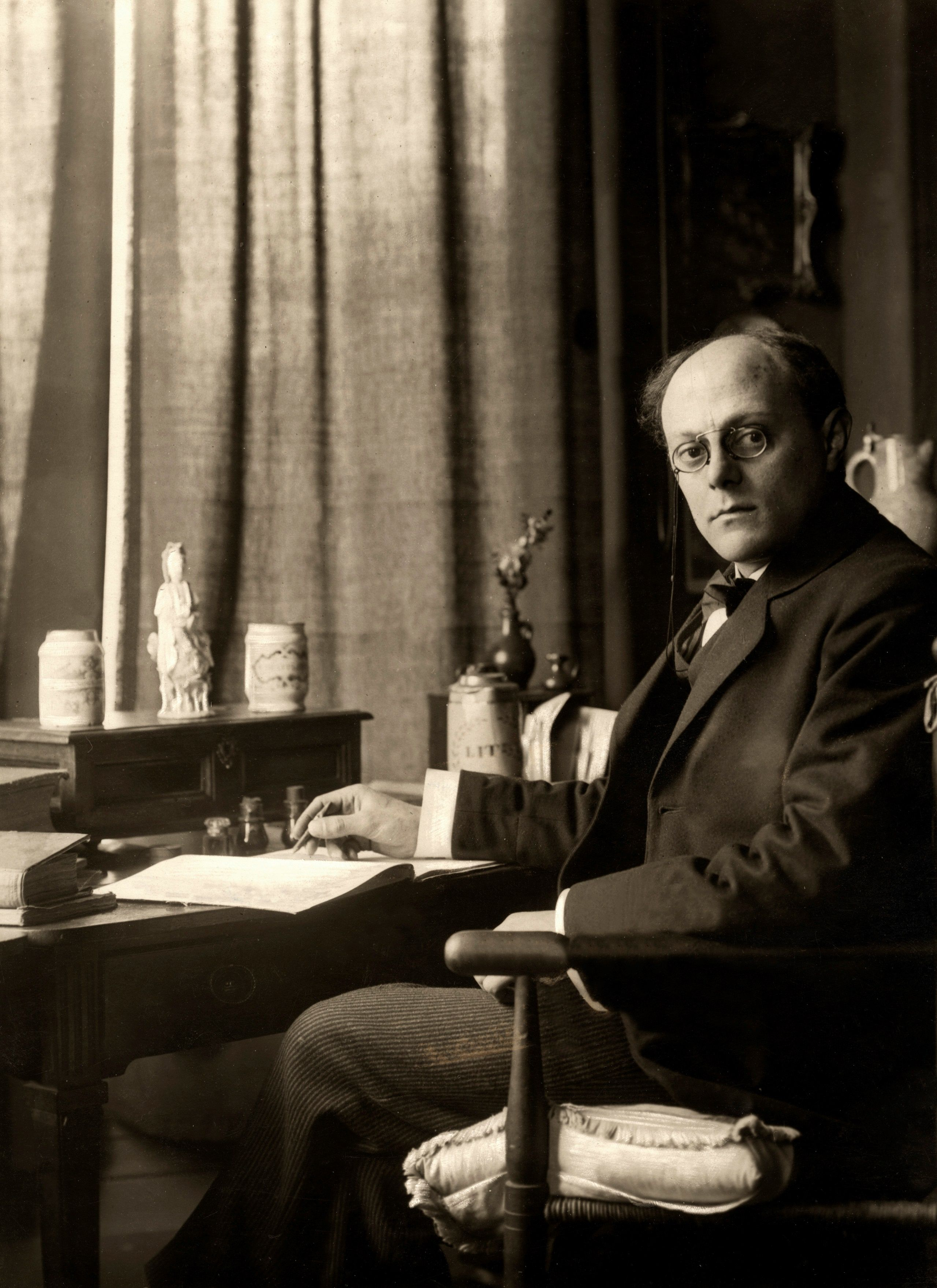
George van Raemdonck

George Van Raemdonck (28 August 1888 – 28 January 1966) was a Belgian comics artist and painter, and is generally considered to be the first Flemish comics author. He mainly worked for left-wing, socialist and anti-fascist magazines and newspapers, creating thousands of political cartoons.

== Biography ==
George van Raemdonck was born in Antwerp in 1888. His father, who worked as a pharmacist, also was a talented draftsman. His mother, who was French, died when George was still young. Because George van Raemdonck was gifted with some musical talent, he was sent to the conservatory to study the violin. At the same time, he started painting, and in 1903, aged fifteen, he entered the Royal Academy of Fine Arts in Antwerp, where he was taught by Franz Courtens, and where he won the 1913 de Keyer's Prize. During those years, he already made illustrations for a number of novels and for the magazine Lange Wapper.

He left Antwerp to live in Zwijndrecht on 29 July 1909. On 12 April 1913, he married Adriana Denissen, and their first daughter Pauline is born on 21 February 1914. His second daughter Anna was born on 22 February 1916.

Because of the First World War, he fled on 9 October 1914 with his wife and child to the Netherlands, where he soon started drawing political cartoons for De Amsterdammer. In 1920 he left De Amsterdammer to commence work at De Notenkraker, where he contributed until it folded in July 1936.

Dutch writer A. M. De Jong was impressed by his work and asked him at the end of 1917 to illustrate his juvenile novel Vacantiedagen. They soon became friends. In 1922, De Jong asked him to provide the drawings for the comic strip Bulletje en Boonestaak, which was published between 2 May 1922 and 17 November 1937 in Het Volk, the daily newspaper of the Social Democratic Workers' Party, and in Voorwaarts. The author and artist regularly added references to one another or cameos of each other in the strip. The comic strip was collected in books in Dutch, with at least 66 different editions so far, and has been translated in German in 1924 and in French in 1926.

They also created together the book Vrolike Vertelsels, with 62 drawings by van Raemdonck, written by De Jong with the pen name Frank van Waes. Another comic strip they cocreated was Appelsnoet en Goudbaard, published between 1925 and 1927 in the magazine Blue Band, a purely commercial publication by a butter producer.

On 12 November 1928, van Raemdonck moved back to Belgium and started painting again, but he continued his close collaboration with De Jong until the sudden death of De Jong during the Second World War, when he was assassinated on 18 October 1943 by Dutch SS members. Apart from the comics, their most successful collaboration was the bookseries Merijntje Gijzen, which started in 1935 and was made into a film in 1936.

After the war, van Raemdonck started a long-term collaboration with writer L. Roelandt (pen name of Jef Van Droogenbroeck), creating together the comic strips Tijl Uilenspiegel, appearing from 1964 on in Vooruit, Smidje Smee and Robinson Crusoë. He lived his last years in Boechout, where he died in 1966.

In his memory, every three years since 1986 a cartoon contest, the George van Raemdonck Kartoenale, is held in Belgium, with the 11th edition in 2008. A monument representing Bulletje en Boonestaak has been placed in Boechout, and a park in the same town has been named in his honour.

== Bibliography ==
A list of 158 books and comic books illustrated by G. Van Raemdonck can be found at the Dutch Royal Library website .
