= Eerie Publications =

Publisher of comics magazines

- Parent company: M. F. Enterprises
- Founded: 1966
- Founder: Myron Fass; Stanley Harris
- Defunct: 1981
- Country of origin: United States of America
- Headquarters location: 150 Fifth Avenue, New York City
- Key people: Robert W. Farrell; Mel Lenny; Irving Fass; Ezra Jackson; Carl Burgos
- Publication types: Comic magazines
- Fiction genres: Horror, science fiction

Eerie Publications was a publisher of black-and-white horror-anthology comics magazines.

== History ==
Less well-known and more downscale than the field's leader, Warren Publishing (Creepy, Eerie, Vampirella), the company, based at 150 Fifth Avenue in New York City, was one of several related publishing ventures run by comic-book artist and 1970s magazine entrepreneur Myron Fass. Titles published during its 15 years of operation included Weird, Horror Tales, Terror Tales, Tales from the Tomb, Tales of Voodoo, and Witches' Tales. All of these magazines featured grisly, lurid color covers and no advertisements, having the final page of a story on the back cover.

New material was mixed with reprints from 1950s pre-Comics Code horror comics. Writer and artist credits seldom appeared, but included Marvel Comics penciler/inkers Dick Ayers and Chic Stone, as well as Fass himself, with brother Irving Fass and Ezra Jackson serving as art directors. Mel Lenny initially and then Golden Age of Comic Books producer Robert W. Farrell had the title of publisher. Carl Burgos, creator of the Golden Age original Human Torch, was editor; he created a short-lived character called Captain Marvel, no relation to either the old Fawcett Comics superhero nor Marvel's Captain Marvel, for Fass' M. F. Enterprises in 1966.

Fass' business partner, Stanley Harris, left in 1976 after a falling-out, and formed Harris Publications, whose comic book arm published Vampirella and other former Warren properties.

== Titles published ==
- Horror Tales (27 issues, June 1969 – Feb. 1979)
- Strange Galaxy (4 issues, Feb. 1971 – Aug. 1971)
- Tales from the Crypt (1 issue, July 1968)
- Tales from the Tomb (33 issues, July 1969 – Feb. 1975)
- Tales of Voodoo (36 issues, Nov.1968 – Nov. 1974)
- Terror Tales (46 issues, March 1969 – Jan.1979)
- Terrors of Dracula (9 issues, May 1979 – Sept. 1981)
- Weird (69 issues, Jan, 1966 – Nov. 1981)
- Weird Worlds (5 issues, Dec. 1970 – Aug. 1971)
- Witches' Tales (34 issues, July 1969 – Feb. 1975)
