= Theophilus (comic strip) =

American comic strip by Bob West

Theophilus was an American religious comic strip founded by illustrator Bob West that was syndicated from February 6, 1966, through April 19, 2002. The strip primarily ran in church newsletters and related publications, but has also run online, appeared in newspapers, been translated into Spanish and French, and appeared in CD-ROM collections and printed anthologies.

== History ==
The strip originated in a small newsletter of the church West attended. However, in December 1967 West was told the cartoons would be dropped because, "Theophilus hurts people's feelings." West sold the strip to a monthly journal with a much larger circulation. Theophilus also went on to achieve publication in local and college newspapers across the country, along with re-publication in a wide range of church bulletins and newsletters. West stopped drawing new cartoons for a number of years, but continued to allow old strips to be re-published various places. In January 1989 West resumed drawing new strips (largely in response to attacks from critics questioning his theology). In 1991 West and collaborator Art Thompson released the book Theophilus and the One True Church. It was followed by a second book, Theophilus and the Powers of Darkness.

West discontinued the series in 2002 in order to work on his new comic strip, Our Father's Children.

== Characters ==
The strip originally featured a quiet, humble man named Theophilus searching for truth amongst a cast of more prideful, arrogant, and holier-than-thou characters. Theophilus interacted with neighborhood gossips and narrow-minded scientists, as well as sanctimonious members of the church. Theophilus attended the One True Church, a Christian denomination led by Brother Fairasee. After a number of years, Theophilus was excommunicated from the church over questioning aspects of its dogma. However, Brother Fairasee and other characters belonging to the One True Church continued to appear in the strip, usually commenting on how wrong and misguided humble, simple-minded Theophilus was.

In the 1990s, creator West enlarged the role of autobiographical characters Sketch and Honey Drawings, characters in the Theophilus universe representing West and his wife. West produced a three-book series titled Theophilus and the Powers of Darkness, depicting West's own personal and private struggles to find religious truth, save his marriage, become closer to his children, and overcome a self-confessed addiction to pornography.

The character Theophilus is named for the biblical Theophilus, to whom the Gospel of Luke and the Acts of the Apostles are addressed.

== Themes ==
The serious, mature themes discussed in Theophilus were contrasted by simple, childlike artwork. All characters (except Brother Fairasee) were depicted as large, bodiless heads with stick-figure legs. Rarely were any characters drawn with arms. Backgrounds, likewise, were rarely depicted. Otherworldly characters were not shown – when God speaks, an outlined word balloon comes down from above. When the devil speaks, a grey-shaded word balloon simply comes up from below.

Through Theophilus, West addressed the topics of faith healing, witchcraft, music, sex, legalism, adultery, divorce, Biblical accuracy and the role of women in the church. While frequently conservative in its tone, Theophilus often left these topics with no clear answers, instead urging the characters (and the reader) to seek answers from God through prayer. On some topics, Theophilus (or Sketch) would even admit in later strips that they were wrong about what they had earlier said or believed.
