= Bunny (Harvey Comics) =

Harvey Comics character

Bunny Ball is a teenage-girl character in humor comic books published by Harvey Comics. She was created by a separate company as a projected doll toy, with Harvey Comics having the comic-book license. The comic was originally written by Warren Harvey, a son of one of the company's founders, and featured artwork by illustrator Hy Eisman. Other artists who worked on the series included Sol Brodsky and Howard Post.

The Bunny series initially ran 20 issues (cover-dated December 1966 – December 1971), with a final, 21st issue published five years later (November 1976). Bunny also appeared in Harvey Pop Comics #2 (November 1969). Every issue also contained a story about Fruitman, a seemingly ordinary guy named Percival Pineapple who had the unusual ability to turn himself into various types of fruit.

Bunny is an international model and actress. She has a younger sister named Honey and a rival named Esmeralda, or Esmy. Other characters include The Beagles, an English rock group fronted by Bunny's love interest Frederick, the poet William Wordsworth, the painter Marc, the Soular System, a foursome similar to the Motown groups of the 1960s, and Felix, a motorcycle cop on whom Esmy has a crush.

In November 1999, Jennifer Love Hewitt was attached to headline a feature film based on the character by MGM. Hewitt was to play a young woman who simultaneously attends college and goes on far-flung James Bond-esque spy missions. Stephen Sommers was in talks to direct.
