= The Galactus Trilogy =

Comic books

- Fantastic Four Vol. 1 #48. Cover art by Jack Kirby and Joe Sinnott.
- Publisher: Marvel Comics
- Publication date: March – May 1966
- Title(s): Fantastic Four #48–50
- Main character(s): Fantastic Four; Galactus; Silver Surfer; The Watcher

Creative team
- Writer(s): Jack Kirby, Stan Lee
- Penciller: Jack Kirby
- Inker: Joe Sinnott
- Letterer(s): Art Simek; Sam Rosen
- Editor: Stan Lee
- Silver Surfer: The Coming of Galactus: ISBN 978-0871359575

"The Galactus Trilogy" is a 1966 three-issue comic book story arc that appeared in Fantastic Four #48–50. Written, co-plotted and drawn by Jack Kirby with editor Stan Lee for Marvel Comics, it introduced the characters Galactus and the Silver Surfer. In 2018, The Atlantic called it "the indisputable pinnacle of the so-called Silver Age of comic books".

== Publication history ==
In 1966, nearly five years after launching Marvel Comics' flagship superhero title, Fantastic Four, Kirby and Lee collaborated on an antagonist designed to break from the era's archetypal mold of supervillains, and instead be a being of god-like stature and power. As Lee recalled in 1993,

Galactus was simply another in a long line of super-villains whom we loved creating. Having dreamed up such powerful baddies as the Mole Man, the Frightful Four, the Grey Gargoyle, the Executioner, the Mandarin and Doctor Doom, we felt the only way to top ourselves was to come up with an evil-doer who had almost godlike powers. Therefore, the natural choice was sort of a demi-god, but now what would we do with him? We didn't want to use the tired old cliche about him wanting to conquer the world. There were enough would-be world conquerors in the Marvel Universe and in all the other comic book galaxies. That was when inspiration struck. Why not have him not be a really evil person? After all, a demi-god should be beyond mere good and evil. He'd just be (don't laugh!) hungry. And the nourishment he'd require is the life force and energy from living planets!"

Kirby described his Biblical inspirations for Galactus and an accompanying character, an angelic Herald Lee dubbed the Silver Surfer:

My inspirations were the fact that I had to make sales and come up with characters that were no longer stereotypes. In other words, I couldn't depend on gangsters. I had to get something new. For some reason, I went to the Bible, and I came up with Galactus. And there I was in front of this tremendous figure, who I knew very well because I've always felt him. I certainly couldn't treat him in the same way I could any ordinary mortal. And I remember in my first story, I had to back away from him to resolve that story. The Silver Surfer is, of course, the fallen angel. When Galactus relegated him to Earth, he stayed on Earth, and that was the beginning of his adventures. They were figures that had never been used before in comics. They were above mythic figures. And of course they were the first gods.

Kirby further explained, "Galactus in actuality is a sort of god. He is beyond reproach, beyond anyone's opinion. In a way he is kind of a Zeus, who fathered Hercules. He is his own legend, and of course, he and the Silver Surfer are sort of modern legends, and they are designed that way."

Writer Mike Conroy expanded on Lee and Kirby's explanation: "In five short years from the launch of the Fantastic Four, the Lee/Kirby duo...had introduced a whole host of alien races or their representatives...there were the Skrulls, the Watcher and the Stranger, all of whom Lee and Kirby used in the foundations of the universe they were constructing, one where all things were possible but only if they did not flout the 'natural laws' of this cosmology. In the nascent Marvel Universe, characters acted consistently, whatever comic they were appearing in. Their actions reverberated through every title. It was pure soap opera but on a cosmic scale, and Galactus epitomized its epic sweep."

All this led to the introduction of Galactus in Fantastic Four #48-50 (March–May 1966), which fans began calling "The Galactus Trilogy". It culminated in Fantastic Four #50 (May 1966), which featured the Silver Surfer interceding on behalf of humankind against Galactus.

== Plot summary ==
=== "The Coming of Galactus!" ===
After wrapping up the Inhumans story of the previous issue, the story moves to the Silver Surfer as he soars through the Andromeda Galaxy, earning the attention of the Skrulls. Terrified, the Skrulls do everything they can to conceal their world from the Surfer's perceptions; it is explained to an inexperienced Skrull that whenever the Silver Surfer appears, his master, Galactus, cannot be far behind.

Back on Earth, the Fantastic Four witness the entire skyline seemingly engulfed in flame. At the Baxter Building, Reed Richards sequesters himself inside his laboratory to analyze the situation. The flames in the sky dissipate, giving way to an unending field of space debris.

The powerful being known as the Watcher appears inside Reed's laboratory. He explains that he is responsible for the atmospheric disturbances, for he has been attempting to conceal Earth's existence from the attention of the Silver Surfer. He further explains that the Surfer is the advance scout of Galactus, a powerful cosmic being that consumes the elemental energies of entire worlds, leaving them as little more than dried, lifeless husks.

The Surfer investigates the Watcher's debris field and finds Earth hidden beneath it. He flies to the roof of the Baxter Building and sends out a cosmic signal for Galactus. The Fantastic Four race to the top of the building, and the Thing rams into the Surfer, knocking him off the building. In the sky above, Galactus' planet-devouring world ship emerges over Manhattan. The giant Galactus exits the ship and declares his intention to consume the entire world.

=== "If This Be Doomsday!" ===
The Watcher tries to appeal to Galactus to leave Earth alone. When diplomacy proves not to work, the Human Torch and the Thing attack Galactus to no effect. The Watcher tells them to return to their base and he will contact them shortly.

Galactus continues to assemble his planet-devouring device and the Watcher explains that there is a device upon Galactus' home planet that could stop him. Meanwhile, the unconscious Silver Surfer wakes up in the apartment of Alicia Masters. She learns of the Surfer's mission and appeals to him to turn against his master and help save the Earth.

When the Fantastic Four attack Galactus' almost completed device, Galactus sends his cyborg Punisher to keep them out of his way while he repairs it. Making use of this distraction and delay, the Watcher boosts Johnny's powers so that he may travel to Galactus' planet and retrieve the weapon they need to defeat Galactus. Alicia convinces the Surfer to help save the Earth.

=== "The Startling Saga of the Silver Surfer!" ===
The Silver Surfer arrives and attacks his former master, giving Johnny the time he needs to return from Galactus' planet with the Ultimate Nullifier. When Reed threatens to use it against Galactus, he agrees to spare the Earth and leave if Reed gives him back the weapon. True to his word, Galactus leaves, but not before trapping the Surfer on Earth by removing his "space-time powers". After the battle, before the Silver Surfer can leave and come to know his sudden new home, Alicia thanks him for his help, causing the jealous Thing to think she is choosing the Surfer over him. He quietly walks away, feeling nothing but rejection, before Alicia has a chance to introduce him with pride.

As life returns to normal, the press dismisses the Galactus fiasco as a hoax, but some citizens prefer to believe otherwise with anything J. Jonah Jameson and the Daily Bugle claim to be a hoax.

== Legacy ==
The popularity of "The Galactus Trilogy" sparked additional appearances by the Silver Surfer in later issues of Fantastic Four and he would eventually receive his own self-titled series. Kirby did not intend Galactus to reappear to preserve his awe-inspiring presence, but his popularity among fans prompted Lee to ask Kirby to bring the character back. In 2012, the storyline was voted as the 19th best comic book storyline by a reader poll at Comic Book Resources.

The story arc was the basis for the third issue of the Marvels four-issue comic book limited series written by Kurt Busiek, painted by Alex Ross, published in 1994. "The Galactus Trilogy" would later be used as the basis for Ultimate Marvel's Ultimate Galactus Trilogy, consisting of three miniseries written by Warren Ellis across 2004 to 2006.

=== Adaptations ===
- The story arc was adapted into episodes of the 1967 Fantastic Four TV series and the 1994 Fantastic Four TV series.
- The story arc was also loosely adapted into the first three-part episode of the TV series Silver Surfer.
- "The Galactus Trilogy" was partially adapted for the 2007 film Fantastic Four: Rise of the Silver Surfer, and is one of the sources of inspiration for the 2025 film The Fantastic Four: First Steps.

== Collected editions ==
"The Galactus Trilogy" has been collected numerous times:

Title	Material collected	Pages	Publication date	ISBN
Silver Surfer: The Coming of Galactus	Fantastic Four #48–50	48	January 1992	978-0871359575
Fantastic Four: Behold... Galactus!	Fantastic Four #48–50, 74–77, 120–123, 242–244	312	August 2018	978-1302505578
Fantastic Four: Behold... Galactus! (Marvel Select)	Fantastic Four #48–50, 120–123, 242–244	232	October 2019	978-1302517632
Silver Surfer Epic Collection: When Calls Galactus	Fantastic Four #48–50, 55, 57–60, 72, 74–77; material from Fantastic Four 56, 61, Annual #5, Tales to Astonish 92–93	320	December 2014	978-0785190028
Fantastic Four: Coming of Galactus! (Marvel Pocketbook)	Fantastic Four #44–51, Annual #3	200	April 2005	978-1904419617
Essential Fantastic Four, Volume 3	Fantastic Four #41–63, Annual #3–4	536	March 2007	0-7851-2625-2
Fantastic Four Omnibus Vol. 2	Fantastic Four #31–60, Annual #2–4	832	June 2007 (reprint December 2013)	0-7851-2403-9 (978-0785185673)
Marvel Masterworks: Fantastic Four, Volume 5	Fantastic Four #41–50, Annual #3	240	September 2007	0-7851-1184-0
Fantastic Four Epic Collection: The Coming of Galactus	Fantastic Four #33–51, Annual #3	448	August 2018	978-1302913311
Marvel Visionaries: Jack Kirby	Red Raven Comics #1, Marvel Mystery Comics #13, Captain America Comics #1, Yellow Claw #3, Strange Tales #94, Amazing Adventures #1, Rawhide Kid #17, Hulk #3, Amazing Spider-Man #8, Avengers #4, Sgt. Fury #6, Fantastic Four #48–51, Thor #134–136, Fantastic Four Annual #5, Amazing Adventures (Vol. 2) #1–2, Captain America #200, Eternals #7, What If? #11	352	September 2019	978-1302919696
