= Bulletje en Boonestaak =

Bulletje en Boonestaak (later spelled Bulletje en Bonestaak) was one of the first very successful Dutch newspaper comic strips, the first Dutch comic moralists, and the first Dutch comic translated into other languages.

It ran from May 2, 1922 until November 17, 1937 in the Dutch papers Het Volk and Voorwaarts, drawn by the Flemish artist George Van Raemdonck, who had moved to the Netherlands as a war refugee in 1914, and Dutch writer A. M. de Jong.

The comic appeared in 1924 in German translation and in 1926 in French as well (Fil de Fer et Boule de Gomme). A Dutch comics award for contributions to the development of Dutch comics, the Bulletje en Boonestaak schaal is named after this comic.

== Characters and story ==
The contents are the adventures of the boys Bulletje (Bully) and Bo(o)nestaak (Beanstalk), the former short and sturdy, the latter thin and tall, who accompany their fathers, a captain and a coxswain, on the ship "Herkules" on a very long trip, but these adventures were told in a socially engaged fashion. The comic was controversial as the stories contained, for instance, nudity, fighting, vomiting, and the use of bad language.

Later editions were often censored; swimming trunks were added and parts of the story were cut. For instance, the beating of the stars of the comic of a concurrent newspaper with different political views in episode #1 and the begging, mutilated World War I veterans in episode #2 were removed from the story in the 1949 edition.

== Episodes ==
- Ontmoeting met Jopie Slim en Dikkie Bigmans (nr. 1-90)
- Ouwe Hein's eerste schipbreuk (nr. 91-182)
- Ouwe Hein onder de zeerovers (nr. 183-274)
- Avonturen in New York (nr. 275-366)
- Naar het midden-westen (nr. 367-459)
- Ouwe Dick en de bende van Zwarte Jack 5 (nr. 460-551)
- Ned's avonturen in Alaska (nr. 552-643)
- Paardendiefstal op de farm (nr. 644-35)
- Weer aan boord van de Herkules (nr. 736-827)
- Ouwe Hein onder de ijsberen (nr. 828-841)
- De onderwerping van de menseneter (nr. 942-1044)
- De vertellingen van de menseneter (nr. 1045-1146)
- Hoe Bulletje en Bonestaak de bewoonde wereld terugvinden (nr. 1147-1248)
- Alle raadselen opgelost (nr. 1249-1329)
- Ouwe Hein's wonderbaarlijke reis door het luchtruim (nr. 1330-1438)
- Het Neptunusfeest op de Herkules (nr. 1439-1566)
- Ouwe Hein's avonturen onder de Barbarijse zeerovers in de Sargassozee (nr. 1567-1664)
- Ouwe Hein's wonderbare thuiskomst (nr. 1665-1769)
- Van oorlogje spelen en heldendom (nr. 1770-1888)
- Bulletje en Bonestaak in Brazilië (nr. 1889-1978)
- Met Braziliaanse oceaanvliegers naar Florida (nr. 1979-2085)
- Landing op Schiphol (nr. 2086-2186)
- Muiterij op de Herkules (nr. 2187-2292)
- Ouwe Hein in Eldorado (nr. 2293-2403)
- Jacht op het goud van Ouwe Hein (nr. 2404-2499)
- Ouwe Hein wordt president van Brazilië (nr. 2500-2600)
- Een orkaan teistert de Herkules (nr. 1-99, nieuwe telling)
- Reparatie in Californië (nr. 100-195)
- Scheepshond Nero maakt de stad onveilig (nr. 196-295)
- Roodkapje, Nero en de boze wolf (nr. 296-391)
- Ouwe Hein in China (nr. 392-488)
- Kamperen in Californië (nr. 489-587)
- De eerste reis van Sinbad de Zeeman (nr. 588-685)
- Ontmoeting met Tom Mix (nr. 686-781)
- De tweede reis van Sinbad de Zeeman (nr. 782-883)
- Tom Mix, de Lange Kogelspuwer (nr. 884-982)
- Ouwe Hein onder de reuzen van Afrika (nr. 984-1085)
- De derde reis van Sinbad de Zeeman (nr. 1086-1191)
- De Sioux roken de vredespijp met de Commanchen (nr. 1192-1297)
- De vierde reis van Sinbad de Zeeman (nr. 1298-1400)
- Tom Mix in Mexico (nr. 1401-1509)
- Tom Mix in het Dal der Gelukzaligen (1510–1615)
- De lange vijfde reis van Sinbad de Zeeman (1616–1721)
- Ouwe Hein als oesterduiker (nr. 1722-1828)
