= Teen humor comics =

Genre of comics

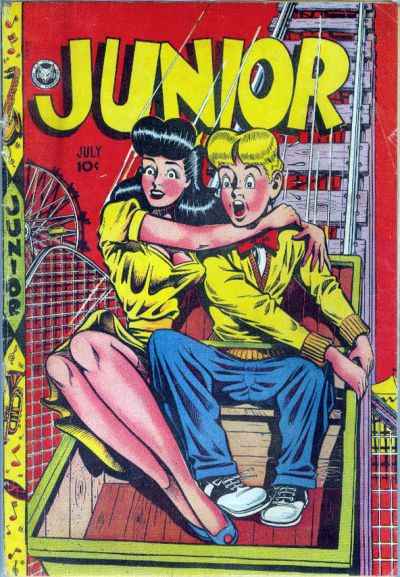
- Last issue of Fox Feature Syndicate's Junior, July 1948, art by Al Feldstein.
- Publishers: MLJ Comics/Archie Comics; Quality Comics; American Comics Group; DC Comics; Timely
- Publications: Pep Comics; Hi-Jinx; Buzzy; Gay Comics; Patsy Walker

Teen humor comics are a genre of comics depicting contemporary American teenagers, which were most popular during the 1940s.

== See also ==
- Humor comics
