= Wyatt Wingfoot =

Fictional character in Marvel Comics

Publication information
- Publisher: Marvel Comics
- First appearance: Fantastic Four #50 (May 1966)
- Created by: Stan Lee (writer); Jack Kirby (artist)

In-story information
- Full name: Wyatt Wingfoot
- Supporting character of: Fantastic Four; She-Hulk

Wyatt Wingfoot is a fictional supporting character appearing in American comic books published by Marvel Comics.

While having no superpowers, he has spent much time in the company of the Fantastic Four due to his friendship with Human Torch, and his relationship with occasional Fantastic Four member She-Hulk. A Native American of the fictional Keewazi tribe, Wingfoot is an excellent athlete, marksman, hand-to-hand fighter, tracker and animal trainer, and has been of timely help in numerous potentially devastating situations.

== Publication history ==
Wyatt Wingfoot first appeared in Fantastic Four #50 (May 1966) and was created by Stan Lee and Jack Kirby. The character was inspired by Olympic athlete Jim Thorpe (1887–1953), who was a member of the Sac and Fox Nation.

== Fictional character biography ==
Wyatt, son of Olympic decathlon star Will Wingfoot, was born on the fictional Keewazi Indian reservation in Oklahoma. He left to attend college at the equally fictional Metro College in New York City. There, Wyatt becomes roommates and friends with Johnny Storm. Wyatt has occasional adventures with Johnny and the other members of the Fantastic Four. Wyatt eventually completes his college degree and graduates, returning to his reservation to become a teacher.

Following the death of Wyatt Wingfoot's grandfather, he is summoned to accept the position as tribal chieftain. At the same time, the alien Terminus arrives in Oklahoma to devour Earth's resources, and the Fantastic Four arrive for battle. Wyatt postpones his investiture as chief of the Keewazi and follows the Fantastic Four instead, returning to New York with Mister Fantastic and She-Hulk.

Wyatt soon begins an intimate relationship with She-Hulk, and helps her confront magazine publisher T.J. Vance. He continues this relationship after the Thing returns and She-Hulk leaves the Fantastic Four. He is part of a group of civilians who are captured via a teleportation beam when S.H.I.E.L.D. goes after She-Hulk. S.H.I.E.L.D. goes after the corrupt officer in charge, endangering everyone on board and anyone the Helicarrier might crash in to. She-Hulk soon neutralizes the threat, and Wyatt survived the crash of the Helicarrier. Wyatt later became engaged to She-Hulk; alongside her, he battled Carlton Beatrice, and then broke off their engagement.

Wyatt Wingfoot returns to his tribe when they discover large oil deposits on their territory. He helps broker a deal between the United States government and the Keewazi.

Wyatt is referred to as one of Johnny Storm's best friends, along with Peter Parker. The two of them hold an intervention for Johnny following his loss of powers and subsequent erratic behavior.

== Powers and abilities ==
Wyatt Wingfoot has no superhuman powers. He is a superb athlete, and a highly skilled tracker, animal trainer, horseman, motorcyclist, dancer and marksman. He is also an excellent hand-to-hand combatant.

Wyatt sometimes rides a gyro-cruiser, provided by the Wakanda Design Group.

== Other versions ==
=== 1602 ===
An alternate universe version of Wyatt Wingfoot appears in Marvel 1602: Fantastick Four as a rival to John Storm for the hand of Doris Evans. At the end of the series, when Evans has thrown them both over for William Shakespeare, Storm and Wingfoot resolve their differences over a drink.

=== Last Avengers Story ===
In one alternate future, Wyatt Wingfoot has married She-Hulk and they have had a child named Jessie. She joins the Avengers to help defeat Ultron.

=== Earth X ===
In the alternate future of Earth X, Wyatt Wingfoot has become Captain America's new partner Redwing, utilizing Falcon's winged harness.

=== Heroes Reborn ===
In the universe of "Heroes Reborn", Wyatt Wingfoot is purportedly a government agent assigned to monitor independent spaceflight and extraterrestrial meetings, but is in reality a spy working for Doctor Doom. Wingfoot is later revealed to have been Kl'rt, a Skrull imposter.

== In other media ==
Wyatt Wingfoot appears as a non-playable character in Marvel: Ultimate Alliance, voiced by Dave Wittenberg.
