= 1951 in comics =

Notable events of 1951 in comics.

== Events ==
=== January ===
- January 21 - La banda dei Dalton, by Aurelio Galeppini and Gia Luigi Bonelli; Tiger Jack, the Tex Willer's Indian pard, makes his debut.
- January 27: The Nero story De Zwarte Voeten is first published in the newspapers. Halfway in the story, the main cast member Meneer Pheip makes his debut.
- Action Comics (1938 series) #152 - DC Comics
- Adventure Comics (1938 series) #160 - DC Comics
- Adventures Into the Unknown! (1948 series) #19 - American Comics Group
- Adventures of Alan Ladd (1949 series) #9 - DC Comics
- Airboy (as Airboy Vol. 7) (1942 series) #12 - Hillman Periodicals
- All Star Comics (becomes All Star Western) (1948 series) #58 - DC Comics
- Amazing Adventures (1950 series) #2 - Ziff-Davis Publishing Company
- Amazing Detective Cases (1950 series) #4 - Atlas Comics
- Archie Comics (1946 series) #48 - Archie Publications
- Archie's Girls Betty and Veronica (1950 series) #7 - Archie Publications
- Archie's Pal Jughead (1949 series) #8 - Archie Publications
- Archie's Rival Reggie (1950 series) #2 - Archie Publications
- Blackhawk (1944 series) #36 - Quality Comics
- The Cisco Kid #2 - Dell Comics
- Dale Evans Comics (1948 series) #15 - DC Comics
- Danger Trail (1950 series) #4 - DC Comics
- Detective Comics (1937 series) #167 - DC Comics
- Journey Into Unknown Worlds (1950 series) #38 - Atlas Comics
- Movie Town Animial Antics (1946 series) #30 - DC Comics
- Mr. District Attorney (1948 series) #19 - DC Comics
- Private Eye (1951 series) #1 - Atlas Comics
- Sensation Comics (1942 series) #101 - DC Comics
- Star Spangled Comics (1941 series) #112 - DC Comics
- Strange Adventures (1950 series) #4 - DC Comics
- Superboy (1949 series) #12 - DC Comics

=== February ===
- February 1: Jean-Michel Charlier and Octave Joly's educational comics series L'Oncle Paul is first published in Spirou.
- A-1 Comics (1944 series) #31 - Magazine Enterprises
- Action Comics (1938 series) #153 - DC Comics
- Adventure Comics (1938 series) #161 - DC Comics
- Adventures into Terror (1950 series) #102 - Atlas Comics
- Adventures Into the Unknown! (1948 series) #20 - American Comics Group
- Adventures of Bob Hope (1950 series) #7 - DC Comics
- Airboy (as Airboy Vol. 8) (1942 series) #1 - Hillman Periodicals
- All American Western (1948 series) #118 - DC Comics
- All Star Comics (1940 series) #57 - final issue (cover-dated February/March), cancelled by DC Comics
- All-True Crime (1948 series) #44 - Atlas Comics
- Amazing Adventures (1950 series) #3 - Ziff-Davis Publishing Company
- Astonishing (1951 series) #2 - Atlas Comics
- Batman (1940 series) #63 - DC Comics
- Blackhawk (1944 series) #37 - Quality Comics
- Detective Comics (1937 series) #168 - DC Comics
- Flash Gordon (1950 series) #4 - Harvey Publications
- Journey Into Unknown Worlds (1950 series) #4 - Atlas Comics
- Marvel Boy (1950 series) #2 - Altas Comics - Marvel Boy will be renamed to Astonishing
- Marvel Tales (1949 series) #102 - Atlas Comics
- Men Adventures (1949 series) #6 - Atlas Comics
- Star Spangled Comics (1941 series) #113 - DC Comics
- Strange Adventures (1950 series) #5 - DC Comics
- Superman (1939 series) #68 - DC Comics
- White Fang (1944 series) #80 - Classics Illustrated
- Young Men (1949 series) #7 - Atlas Comics

=== March ===
- March 4: The final episode of Jules Feiffer's gag comic Clifford is published.
- March 5: Malang is sued by the Filipino police for defamation over a cartoon ridiculing them.
- March 12:
  - David Law's Dennis the Menace makes its debut in The Beano.
  - Hank Ketcham's Dennis the Menace makes its debut.
- March 13: In Mort Walker's Beetle Bailey Beetle Bailey joins the army, which changes the overall concept of the comic strip, originally premiered in 1950.
- March 16: In Charles M. Schulz' Peanuts Charlie Brown and his friends play their first baseball match.
- A-1 Comics (1944 series) #32 - Magazine Enterprises
- Action Comics (1938 series) #154 - DC Comics
- Adventure Comics (1938 series) #162 - DC Comics
- Adventures Into the Unknown! (1948 series) #21 - American Comics Group
- Airboy (as Airboy Vol. 8) (1942 series) #2 - Hillman Periodicals
- Amazing Detective Cases (1950 series) #5 - Atlas Comics
- Archie Comics (1946 series) #49 - Archie Publications
- Archie's Girls Betty and Veronica (1950 series) #8 - Archie Publications
- Archie's Pal Jughead (1949 series) #9 - Archie Publications
- Archie's Rival Reggie (1950 series) #3 - Archie Publications
- Battle (1951 series) #1 - Atlas Comics
- Blackhawk (1944 series) #38 - Quality Comics
- Dale Evans Comics (1948 series) #16 - DC Comics
- Danger Trail (1950 series) #5 - DC Comics
- Detective Comics (1937 series) #169 - DC Comics
- Movie Town Animial Antics (1946 series) #31 - DC Comics
- Mr. District Attorney (1948 series) #20 - DC Comics
- Mystic (1951 series) #1 - Atlas Comics
- Private Eye (1951 series) #2 - Atlas Comics
- Sensation Comics (1942 series) #102 - DC Comics
- Star Spangled Comics (1941 series) #114 - DC Comics
- Strange Adventures (1950 series) #6 - DC Comics
- Superboy (1949 series) #13 - DC Comics
- In Walt Disney's Comics and Stories, A financiar fable by Carl Barks (Dell).

=== April ===
- April 16: Pom's Piet Pienter en Bert Bibber makes its debut in Het Zondagsblad.
- April 17: The final issue of the Belgian comics magazine Bravo! is published.
- April 25: The first issue of the Flemish children's magazine Pum-Pum is published. It will run until 11 January 1967.
- In Osamu Tezuka's Astro Boy story Captain Atom Professor Ochanomizu makes his debut.
- A-1 Comics (1944 series) #33 - Magazine Enterprises
- Action Comics (1938 series) #155 - DC Comics
- Adventure Comics (1938 series) #163 - DC Comics
- Adventures into Terror (1950 series) #103 - Atlas Comics
- Adventures Into the Unknown! (1948 series) #22 - American Comics Group
- Adventures of Bob Hope (1950 series) #8 - DC Comics
- Airboy (as Airboy Vol. 8) (1942 series) #3 - Hillman Periodicals
- All-American Western (1948 series) #119 - DC Comics
- All Star Western (previously All Star Comics) (1948 series) #58 - DC Comics
- All-True Crime (1948 series) #45 - Atlas Comics
- Astonishing (1951 series) #3 - Atlas Comics
- Batman (1940 series) #64 - DC Comics
- Battle (1951 series) #2 - Atlas Comics
- Blackhawk (1944 series) #39 - Quality Comics
- Danger Trail (1950 series) #5 - DC Comics
- Detective Comics (1937 series) #170 - DC Comics
- Flash Gordon (1950 series) #5 - Harvey Publications
- Journey Into Unknown Worlds (1950 series) #5 - Atlas Comics
- Marvel Tales (1949 series) #103 - Atlas Comics
- Men Adventures (1949 series) #7 - Atlas Comics
- Mystery in Space (1951 series) #1 - DC Comics
- Two-Gun Kid (as Two-Gun Western) (1948 series) #6 - Atlas Comics
- Star Spangled Comics (1941 series) #115 - DC Comics
- Strange Adventures (1950 series) #7 - DC Comics
- Superman (1939 series) #69 - DC Comics
- Young Men (1949 series) #8 - Atlas Comics

=== May ===
- May: Manuel Vázquez Gallego's La familia Cebolleta makes its debut in the first issue of El DDT.
- May 22: L'ombra della paura, by Aurelio Galeppini and Gian Luigi Bonelli; Kit, Tex Willer's son, (here a child again) appears for the first time. In the same adventure, set in Canada, two other recurring characters of the series (the Redcoat Jim Brandon and the trapper Gros-Jean) make their debut.
- May 30: In Charles M. Schulz' Peanuts Schroeder makes his debut, though he will not be depicted playing piano until 24 September.
- In Four colors, Old California by Carl Barks.
- A-1 Comics (1944 series) #34 - Magazine Enterprises
- Action Comics (1938 series) #156 - DC Comics
- Adventure Comics (1938 series) #164 - DC Comics
- Adventures Into the Unknown! (1948 series) #23 - American Comics Group
- Airboy (as Airboy Vol. 8) (1942 series) #4 - Hillman Periodicals
- All-Famous Crime (1950 series) #8 - Star Publications
- Amazing Detective Cases (1950 series) #6 - Atlas Comics
- Archie Comics (1946 series) #50 - Archie Publications
- Archie's Girls Betty and Veronica (1950 series) #9 - Archie Publications
- Archie's Pal Jughead (1949 series) #10 - Archie Publications
- Battle (1951 series) #3 - Atlas Comics
- Blackhawk (1944 series) #40 - Quality Comics
- The Cisco Kid (1951 series) #1 - Dell Comics
- Dale Evans Comics (1948 series) #17 - DC Comics
- Detective Comics (1937 series) #171 - DC Comics
- Kid Colt Outlaw (1948 series) #14 - Atlas Comics
- Movie Town Animial Antics (1946 series) #32 - DC Comics
- Mr. District Attorney (1948 series) #21 - DC Comics
- Mystic (1951 series) #2 - Atlas Comics
- Private Eye (1951 series) #3 - Atlas Comics
- Sensation Comics (1942 series) #103 - DC Comics
- Star Spangled Comics (1941 series) #116 - DC Comics
- Strange Adventures (1950 series) #8 - DC Comics first "gorilla themed" cover featured on a DC comic.
- Superboy (1949 series) #14 - DC Comics

=== June ===
- June 30: The final issue of the Dutch comics magazine Tom Poes Weekblad, based on Maarten Toonder's Tom Poes, is published.
- A-1 Comics (1944 series) #35 - Magazine Enterprises
- Action Comics (1938 series) #157 - DC Comics
- Adventure Comics (1938 series) #165 - DC Comics
- Adventures into Terror (1950 series) #104 - Atlas Comics
- Adventures Into the Unknown! (1948 series) #24 - American Comics Group
- Adventures of Bob Hope (1950 series) #9 - DC Comics
- Airboy (as Airboy Vol. 8) (1942 series) #5 - Hillman Periodicals
- All-American Western (1948 series) #120 - DC Comics
- All Star Western (1948 series) #59 - DC Comics
- All-True Crime (1948 series) #46 - Marvel Comics
- Astonishing (1951 series) #4 - Atlas Comics
- Batman (1940 series) #65 - DC Comics
- Battle (1951 series) #4 - Atlas Comics
- Blackhawk (1944 series) #41 - Quality Comics
- Chamber of Chills (1951 series) #1 - Harvey Comics
- The Cisco Kid (1951 series) #2 - Dell Comics
- Detective Comics (1937 series) #172 - DC Comics
- Journey Into Unknown Worlds (1950 series) #6 - Atlas Comics
- Marvel Tales (1949 series) #104 - Atlas Comics
- Men Adventures (1949 series) #8 - Atlas Comics
- Mystery in Space (1951 series) #2 - DC Comics
- PS, The Preventive Maintenance Monthly - Department of the Army
- Star Spangled Comics (1941 series) #117 - DC Comics
- Strange Adventures (1950 series) #9 - DC Comics
- Strange Tales (1951 series) #1 - Atlas Comics
- Superman (1939 series) #70 - DC Comics
- Two-Gun Kid (as Two-Gun Western) (1948 series) #7 - Atlas Comics
- Witches Tales (1951 series) #1 - Harvey Comics
- Young Men (1949 series) #9 - Atlas Comics

=== July ===
- July 1: EsseGesse's Captain Miki makes its debut.
- July 19: Bob De Moor's Cori, de Scheepsjongen (Cori Le Moussaillon) makes its debut in Tintin.
- July 26: in Spirou, first strip of Spirou et les Héritiers; Zantafio makes his debut.
- A-1 Comics (1944 series) #36 - Magazine Enterprises
- Action Comics (1938 series) #158 - DC Comics
- Adventure Comics (1938 series) #166 - DC Comics
- Adventures Into the Unknown! (1948 series) #25 - American Comics Group
- Airboy (as Airboy Vol. 8) (1942 series) #6 - Hillman Periodicals
- All-Famous Crime (1950 series) #9 - Star Publications
- Amazing Detective Cases (1950 series) #7 - Marvel Comics
- Archie Comics (1946 series) #51 - Archie Publications
- Archie's Girls Betty and Veronica (1950 series) #10 - Archie Publications
- Archie's Pal Jughead (1949 series) #11 - Archie Publications
- Battle (1951 series) #5 - Atlas Comics
- Blackhawk (1944 series) #42 - Quality Comics
- The Cisco Kid (1951 series) #3 - Dell Comics
- Dale Evans Comics (1948 series) #18 - DC Comics
- Detective Comics (1937 series) #173 - DC Comics
- Frontline Combat #1 - (EC Comics)
- Kid Colt Outlaw (1948 series) #15 - Atlas Comics
- Movie Town Animial Antics (1946 series) #33 - DC Comics
- Mr. District Attorney (1948 series) #22 - DC Comics
- Mystic (1951 series) #3 - Atlas Comics
- Private Eye (1951 series) #4 - Atlas Comics
- Sensation Comics (1942 series) #104 - DC Comics
- Star Spangled Comics (1941 series) #118 - DC Comics
- Strange Adventures (1950 series) #10 - DC Comics
- Superboy (1949 series) #15 - DC Comics

=== August ===
- August 16: In Charles M. Schulz' Peanuts Lucy van Pelt calls Charlie Brown "a blockhead" for the first time. This will become a running gag in the series.
- August 29: The first issue of the German Disney comics magazine Micky Maus is published.
- A-1 Comics (1944 series) #37 - Magazine Enterprises
- Action Comics (1938 series) #159 - DC Comics
- Adventure Comics (1938 series) #167 - DC Comics
- Adventures into Terror (1950 series) #105 - Atlas Comics
- Adventures Into the Unknown! (1948 series) #26 - American Comics Group
- Adventures of Bob Hope (1950 series) #10 - DC Comics
- Airboy (as Airboy Vol. 8) (1942 series) #7 - Hillman Periodicals
- All-American Western (1948 series) #121 - DC Comics
- All Star Western (1948 series) #60 - DC Comics
- All-True Crime (1948 series) #47 - Atlas Comics
- Astonishing (1951 series) #5 - Atlas Comics
- Batman (1940 series) #66 - DC Comics
- Battle (1951 series) #6 - Atlas Comics
- Blackhawk (1944 series) #43 - Quality Comics
- The Cisco Kid (1951 series) #4 - Dell Comics
- Detective Comics (1937 series) #174 - DC Comics
- Journey Into Unknown Worlds (1950 series) #7 - Atlas Comics
- Marvel Tales (1949 series) #105 - Atlas Comics
- Men Adventures (1949 series) #9 - Atlas Comics
- Mystery in Space (1951 series) #3 - DC Comics
- Strange Adventures (1950 series) #11 - DC Comics
- Star Spangled Comics (1941 series) #119 - DC Comics
- Strange Tales (1951 series) #2 - Atlas Comics
- Superman (1939 series) #71 - DC Comics
- Two-Gun Kid (as Two-Gun Western) (1948 series) #8 - Atlas Comics
- Young Men (1949 series) #10 - Atlas Comics

=== September ===
- September 20: In the 701th issue of Spirou Morris publishes the Lucky Luke story Hors La Loi in which the Daltons make their debut.
- September 24: In Charles M. Schulz' Peanuts Schroeder is first seen behind his piano.
- September 26: Willy Vandersteen's comics series Tijl Uilenspiegel debuts in Tintin.
- A-1 Comics (1944 series) #38 - Magazine Enterprises
- Action Comics (1938 series) #160 - DC Comics
- Adventure Comics (1938 series) #168 - DC Comics
- Adventures Into the Unknown! (1948 series) #27 - American Comics Group
- Airboy (as Airboy Vol. 8) (1942 series) #8 - Hillman Periodicals
- Amazing Detective Cases (1950 series) #8 - Atlas Comics
- Archie Comics (1946 series) #52 - Archie Publications
- Archie's Girls Betty and Veronica (1950 series) #11 - Archie Publications
- Archie's Pal Jughead (1949 series) #12 - Archie Publications
- Battle (1951 series) #7 - Atlas Comics
- Blackhawk (1944 series) #44 - Quality Comics
- The Cisco Kid (1951 series) #5 - Dell Comics
- Dale Evans Comics (1948 series) #19 - DC Comics
- Detective Comics (1937 series) #175 - DC Comics
- Kid Colt Outlaw (1948 series) #16 - Atlas Comics
- Movie Town Animial Antics (1946 series) #34 - DC Comics
- Mr. District Attorney (1948 series) #23 - DC Comics
- Mystic (1951 series) #4 - Atlas Comics
- Private Eye (1951 series) #5 - Atlas Comics
- Sensation Comics (1942 series) #105 - DC Comics
- Star Spangled Comics (1941 series) #120 - DC Comics
- Strange Adventures (1950 series) #12 - DC Comics
- Superboy (1949 series) #16 - DC Comics

=== October ===
- A-1 Comics (1944 series) #39 - Magazine Enterprises
- Action Comics (1938 series) #161 - DC Comics
- Adventure Comics (1938 series) #169 - DC Comics
- Adventures into Terror (1950 series) #106 - Atlas Comics
- Adventures Into the Unknown! (1948 series) #28 - American Comics Group
- Adventures of Bob Hope (1950 series) #11 - DC Comics
- Airboy (as Airboy Vol. 8) (1942 series) #9 - Hillman Periodicals
- All-American Western (1948 series) #122 - DC Comics
- All Star Western (1940 series) #61 - DC Comics
- All-True Crime (1948 series) #48 - Atlas Comics
- Astonishing (1951 series) #6 - Atlas Comics
- Batman (1940 series) #67 - DC Comics
- Battle (1951 series) #8 - Atlas Comics
- Blackhawk (1944 series) #45 - Quality Comics
- Detective Comics (1937 series) #176 - DC Comics
- Journey Into Unknown Worlds (1950 series) #8 - Atlas Comics
- Marvel Tales (1949 series) #106 - Atlas Comics
- Men Adventures (1949 series) #10 - Atlas Comics
- Mystery in Space (1951 series) #4 - DC Comics
- Star Spangled Comics (1941 series) #121 - DC Comics
- Strange Adventures (1950 series) #13 - DC Comics
- Strange Tales (1951 series) #3 - Atlas Comics
- Superman (1939 series) #72 - DC Comics
- Two-Gun Kid (as Two-Gun Western) (1948 series) #9 - Atlas Comics
- Young Men (1949 series) #11 - Atlas Comics

=== November ===
- November 2: The first issue of the British comics magazine Girl is published. It will run until 3 October 1964.
- November 17: Vilhelm Hansen and Carla Hansen's comic strip Rasmus Klump is first published.
- November: In the Donald Duck story Terror of the Beagle Boys by Carl Barks the Beagle Boys make their debut. The same story also introduces Uncle Scrooge's Money Bin.
- A-1 Comics (1944 series) #40 - Magazine Enterprises
- Action Comics (1938 series) #162 - DC Comics
- Adventure Comics (1938 series) #170 - DC Comics
- Adventures Into the Unknown! (1948 series) #29 - American Comics Group
- Airboy (as Airboy Vol. 8) (1942 series) #10 - Hillman Periodicals
- All-Famous Crime (1950 series) #10 - Star Publications
- Amazing Detective Cases (1950 series) #9 - Atlas Comics
- Archie Comics (1946 series) #53 - Archie Publications
- Archie's Girls Betty and Veronica (1950 series) #12 - Archie Publications
- Archie's Pal Jughead (1949 series) #13 - Archie Publications
- Battle (1951 series) #9 - Atlas Comics
- Blackhawk (1944 series) #46 - Quality Comics
- Combat Kelly (1951 series) #1 - Atlas Comics
- Dale Evans Comics (1948 series) #20 - DC Comics
- Detective Comics (1937 series) #177 - DC Comics
- Kid Colt Outlaw (1948 series) #17 - Atlas Comics
- Movie Town Animial Antics (1946 series) #35 - DC Comics
- Mr. District Attorney (1948 series) #24 - DC Comics
- Mystic (1951 series) #5 - Atlas Comics
- Police Comics (1951 series) #109 - DC Comics
- Private Eye (1951 series) #6 - Atlas Comics
- Sensation Comics (1942 series) #106 - DC Comics
- Star Spangled Comics (1941 series) #122 - DC Comics
- Strange Adventures (1950 series) #14 - DC Comics
- Superboy (1949 series) #17 - DC Comics

=== December ===
- December 5: The first issue of the Finnish Disney comics magazine Aku Ankka is published.
- December 28: André Breton, Benjamin Péret and Paul Braig's La Vie Imaginée de Pablo Picasso is launched in the magazine Arts. It's a comic strip about Pablo Picasso and run until 8 February 1952.
- In the 37th issue of Will Eisner and Lou Fine's Doll Man Doll Man's girlfriend Martha Roberts becomes his team partner under the name Midge, the Doll Girl.
- A-1 Comics (1944 series) #41 - Magazine Enterprises
- Action Comics (1938 series) #163 - DC Comics
- Adventure Comics (1938 series) #171 - DC Comics
- Adventures into Terror (1950 series) #107 - Atlas Comics
- Adventures Into the Unknown! (1948 series) #30 - American Comics Group
- Adventures of Bob Hope (1950 series) #12 - DC Comics
- Airboy (as Airboy Vol. 8) (1942 series) #11 - Hillman Periodicals
- All-American Western (1948 series) #123 - DC Comics
- All Star Western (1940 series) #62 - DC Comics
- All-True Crime (1948 series) #49 - Atlas Comics
- Astonishing (1951 series) #7 - Atlas Comics
- Batman (1940 series) #68 - DC Comics
- Battle (1951 series) #10 - Atlas Comics
- Blackhawk (1944 series) #47 - Quality Comics
- Combat Kelly (1951 series) #2 - Atlas Comics
- Detective Comics (1937 series) #178 - DC Comics
- House of Mystery (1951 series) #1 - DC Comics
- Journey Into Unknown Worlds (1950 series) #9 - Atlas Comics
- Marvel Tales (1949 series) #107 - Atlas Comics
- Men Adventures (1949 series) #11 - Atlas Comics
- Mystery in Space (1951 series) #5 - DC Comics
- Star Spangled Comics (1941 series) #123 - DC Comics
- Strange Adventures (1950 series) #15 - DC Comics
- Strange Tales (1951 series) #4 - Atlas Comics
- Superman (1939 series) #73 - DC Comics
- Two-Gun Kid (as Two-Gun Western) (1948 series) #10 - Atlas Comics
- Young Men (1949 series) #12 - Atlas Comics - Renamed to Young Men on the Battlefield

=== Specific date unknown ===
- Eric Stanton concludes his erotic comic series Dianna.
- John Gee's The Tindertoes makes its debut. He will draw it until his death in 1977, after which it's continued.
- J.H. Koeleman publishes his first Pinkie Pienter (Ronny Roberts) album.
- Maurice Chénechot draws Riri, which will last until 1953.
- Tom Okamoto's gagcomic Deems first appears in print. It will run in syndication until 1980.
- Archie Comics Annual (1946 series) #2 - Archie Publications
- Hopalong Cassidy (1946 series) #60 - Quality Comics
- King Solomon's Mines - Avon Comics
- Rocket To The Moon - Avon Comics

== Births ==
=== September ===
- September 27: Jim Shooter, American comic book writer (Marvel Comics, Legion of Super-Heroes, Valiant Comics), (d. 2025).

=== December ===
- December 22: Tony Isabella, American comic book writer, artist, and critic (Daredevil, Spider-Man, Ghost Rider, creator of Black Lightning).

== Deaths ==
=== January ===
- January 7: Nelly Bodenheim, Dutch painter, illustrator and comics artist, dies at age 76.

=== April ===
- April 5: Harry Hemsley, British comedian, radio presenter, comics artist, voice actor and illustrator (drew for Ally Sloper's Half Holiday, wrote and drew comics based on his own radio show Ovaltiney's Concert Party), dies at age 73.
- April 7: Gustave-Henri Jossot, French painter, caricaturist, illustrator and comics artist (made early text comics), dies at age 84.
- April 24: Henry Yoshikata Kiyama, Japanese manga artist (The Four Immigrants Manga), dies at age 75.

=== May ===
- May 21: Clifford McBride, American comics artist (Napoleon and Uncle Elby), dies at age 50.
- May 26: George Stampa, British illustrator, editorial cartoonist and comics artist, dies at age 75.

=== June ===
- June 10: Dudley Fisher, American comics artist (Right Around Home), dies at age 60 or 61.

=== July ===
- July 8: Walter Trier, Czech-German illustrator and comics artist, dies at age 61.

=== August ===
- August 14: William Randolph Hearst, American newspaper comics publisher, co-founder of King Features and major force behind the comics industry, dies at age 88.

=== September ===
- September 18: Gelett Burgess, American poet, novelist, illustrator and comics artist (Goops), dies at age 85.

=== October ===
- October 7: Hank Porter, American comic artist (Disney comics, comics based on Disney's animated features), dies at age 50.

=== November ===
- November 8: Antoni Muntañola, Spanish illustrator and comics artist, dies at age 67 or 68.
- November 10: William Meade Prince, American illustrator, theatrical actor and comics artist (Aladdin, Jr.), commits suicide at age 58.

=== December ===
- December 2: J.P. Arnot, American comics artist (Helpful Henry), dies at age 64.

=== Specific date unknown ===
- Bernard Graddon, British comics artist (Just Jake), dies at age 80 or 81.
- George Frederick Kaber, American illustrator (The Adventures of Lovely Lilly), dies at age 90 or 91.

== Initial appearances by character name ==
- Tiger Jack, Tex Willer's Indian pard, in The Dalton gang, (January) created by Gian Luigi Bonelli and Galep - Bonelli
- Knights of the Galaxy in Mystery in Space #1 (April), created by Robert Kanigher and Carmine Infantino - DC Comics
- Kit Willer, Tex Willer's son, in The shadow of fear (May–October) created by Gian Luigi Bonelli and Galep - Bonelli.
- Captain Comet in Strange Adventures #9 (June), created by Julius Schwartz, John Broome and Carmine Infantino - DC Comics
- Pedrito el drito by Antonio Terenghi (Editrice Universo, Italy)

== See also ==
- 1950 in comics
- other events of 1951
- 1952 in comics
- 1950s in comics
- list of years in comics
