= List of years in comics =

This page indexes the individual year in comics pages. Each year is annotated with significant events as reference points.

2026–present - 1976–2025 - 1930–1975 - Pre-1930s

== Pre-1930s ==
- Before 1900s in comics
- 1900s in comics - debut: Happy Hooligan, Little Jimmy, Little Nemo in Slumberland
- 1910s in comics - debut: Krazy Kat, Polly and Her Pals
- 1920s in comics - debut: The Adventures of Tintin, Little Orphan Annie, Skippy, Rupert Bear, Popeye, Buck Rogers

== 1930–1975 ==
- 1930 in comics - debut: Blondie, Scorchy Smith, Quick et Flupke; debut as comic strip: Mickey Mouse
- 1931 in comics - debut: The Little King, Dick Tracy, Norakuro
- 1932 in comics - debut: Alley Oop, Jane, Conan the Barbarian; debut as comic strip: Silly Symphony
- 1933 in comics - debut: Dickie Dare, Brick Bradford
- 1934 in comics - debut: Li'l Abner, Flash Gordon, Mandrake the Magician, Secret Agent X-9, Terry and the Pirates, Sally the Sleuth; appearance: Snuffy Smith in Barney Google; published: Le Journal de Mickey; Establishment of DC Comics
- 1935 in comics - debut: Hejji, King of the Royal Mounted, Little Lulu, Barney Baxter; published: New Fun Comics #1, New Comics #1
- 1936 in comics - debut: Jo, Zette et Jocko, The Phantom, The Clock, Big Chief Wahoo
- 1937 in comics - debut: Prince Valiant, Sheena, Queen of the Jungle, Abbie an' Slats, Torchy Brown; debut as comic strip: Donald Duck, Desperate Dan; published: Detective Comics #1 The Dandy #1
- 1938 in comics - debut: Spirou, Tif, The Addams Family, Superman; published: Le Journal de Spirou, Action Comics #1, The Beano #1
- 1939 in comics - debut: Batman; published: Superman #1 (reprints from Action Comics); Establishment of Marvel Comics
- 1940 in comics - debut: Green Lantern, Flash, Robin, Joker, Catwoman, The Spirit, Lady Luck, Mr. Mystic, Willie and Joe, Brenda Starr, Reporter, Daredevil (Lev Gleason Publications), Captain Marvel later named Shazam; published: Flash Comics #1
- 1941 in comics - debut: Penguin, Sad Sack, Jean Valhardi, Plastic Man, Captain America, Wonder Woman, Aquaman, Gordo; appearance: Pogo Possum in Animal Comics; published: Captain America Comics #1
- 1942 in comics - debut: Two-Face, The Pie-face Prince of Pretzelburg, Archie Comics
- 1943 in comics - debut: Garth, Claire Voyant, Male Call, Buz Sawyer
- 1944 in comics - debut: Johnny Hazard
- 1945 in comics - debut: Suske en Wiske; published: Vaillant #1
- 1946 in comics - debut: Lucky Luke, Blake et Mortimer, Rip Kirby; published: Tintin magazine #1
- 1947 in comics - debut: Steve Canyon, Black Canary, Johan
- 1948 in comics - debut: Riddler, Alix, Tex Willer, Pogo
- 1949 in comics - debut:
- 1950 in comics - debut: Peanuts, Dan Dare, Captain Pugwash, Beetle Bailey, It Rhymes with Lust
- 1951 in comics - debut: Dennis the Menace (U.S. comic strip)
- 1952 in comics - debut: Astro Boy; appearance: Marsupilami in Spirou et Fantasio; published: Mad #1
- 1953 in comics - debut: El Sargento Kirk
- 1954 in comics - debut: Moomin, Marmaduke, Jerry Spring; published: Misterix #1
- 1955 in comics - debut: Modeste et Pompon, Martian Manhunter, Ric Hochet
- 1956 in comics - debut: The Flash, ushering in the Silver Age of Comics
- 1957 in comics - debut: Gaston Lagaffe, El Eternauta, Andy Capp, Ernie Pike; published: Hora Cero #1
- 1958 in comics - debut: B.C., Oumpah-pah, Mort & Phil, Rick O'Shay; debut as comic strip: James Bond; appearance: Les Schtroumpfs in Johan et Pirlouit
- 1959 in comics - debut: Clifton, Boule et Bill, Supergirl, Astérix, Monica's Gang; published: Pilote magazine #1
- 1960 in comics - debut: Justice League
- 1961 in comics - debut: Fantastic Four #1, Spy vs. Spy, Batgirl
- 1962 in comics - debut: Mort Cinder, Iznogoud, Spider-Man, Hulk, Thor, Little Annie Fanny, Valiant, Diabolik
- 1963 in comics - debut: Achille Talon, Blueberry, Modesty Blaise, X-Men, The Avengers, Doctor Strange, Iron Man; published: The Amazing Spider-Man #1;
- 1964 in comics - debut: Mafalda, The Wizard of Id, Zatanna, Black Widow, Teen Titans
- 1965 in comics - debut: Philémon, Fritz the Cat; appearance: Valentina in Neutron; published: Linus
- 1966 in comics - debut: Black Panther
- 1967 in comics - debut: Corto Maltese, Valérian and Laureline, Luc Orient; published: Sgt. Kirk #1
- 1968 in comics - debut: Maxmagnus, Cubitus, His Name Is... Savage; published: Shonen Jump #1
- 1969 in comics - debut: Alan Ford, Doraemon; published: Charlie Mensuel #1, Pif gadget #1 (from Vaillant); Čtyřlístek
- 1970 in comics - debut: Doonesbury, Natacha, Yoko Tsuno
- 1971 in comics - debut: Blackmark
- 1972 in comics - debut: Superdupont, Maus; published: L'Écho des Savannes #1, Wimmen's Comix #1
- 1973 in comics - debut: Le Génie des alpages, Hägar the Horrible, Heathcliff
- 1974 in comics - debut: Herman, Star Reach
- 1975 in comics - published: Métal Hurlant #1, Fluide Glacial #1, Circus #1

== 1976–2025 ==
- 1976 in comics - debut: Adèle Blanc-Sec, American Splendor, Footrot Flats, published: Action #1
- 1977 in comics - debut: Cerebus the Aardvark, Ms. Marvel, Judge Dredd, Shoe, Idées noires; published: Le Trombone Illustré #1, Heavy Metal #1, 2000 AD
- 1978 in comics - published: (A SUIVRE) #1; debut: The Adventures of Luther Arkwright, Garfield, A Contract with God, Urusei Yatsura
- 1979 in comics - debut: Jeremiah, For Better or For Worse
- 1980 in comics - debut: Bloom County, Dr. Slump, She-Hulk, Starfire, Cyborg, The Far Side, Raw
- 1981 in comics - debut: Thrud the Barbarian, Torpedo
- 1982 in comics - debut: Camelot 3000 (first Maxi-series)
- 1983 in comics - debut: Fist of the North Star; published: Metropol #1
- 1984 in comics - debut: Dragon Ball, Teenage Mutant Ninja Turtles, 2001 Nights
- 1985 in comics - debut: Calvin and Hobbes
- 1986 in comics - debut: Watchmen, Dylan Dog, V for Vendetta, The Tick
- 1987 in comics - debut: Titeuf, Super Commando Dhruva, JoJo's Bizarre Adventure,
- 1988 in comics - debut: The Sandman, FoxTrot, Piranha Club, Ah! My Goddess
- 1989 in comics - debut: Outland, Dilbert, Ghost in the Shell
- 1990 in comics - debut: Battle Angel Alita
- 1991 in comics - debut: Sailor Moon, Ballard Street, Bone, Deadpool
- 1992 in comics - debut: Non Sequitur, Spawn, Bloodshot
- 1993 in comics - debut: Hellboy; appearance: Harley Quinn, Static
- 1994 in comics - debut: Mallard Fillmore, Marvels, Mutts; first webcomics (NetBoy, Rogues of Clwyd-Rhan)
- 1995 in comics - debut: Astro City, Over the Hedge
- 1996 in comics - debut: Birds of Prey, Keyhole, Yu-Gi-Oh!
- 1997 in comics - debut: One Piece, Hellsing; published: BoDoï #1
- 1998 in comics - debut: Love Hina
- 1999 in comics - debut: Get Fuzzy, Naruto, The League of Extraordinary Gentlemen, 20th Century Boys, The Goon
- 2000 in comics - debut:
- 2001 in comics - debut: Pearls Before Swine
- 2002 in comics - debut: Invincible
- 2003 in comics - debut: Opus, Death Note, Wanted, Lucky Star, The Walking Dead
- 2004 in comics - debut: Scott Pilgrim
- 2005 in comics - debut: Cyanide and Happiness
- 2006 in comics - debut: Lackadaisy
- 2007 in comics - debut: Hark! A Vagrant, Hello Kitty manga
- 2008 in comics - debut: Kick-Ass, Locke & Key
- 2009 in comics - debut: Attack on Titan, Simon's Cat
- 2010 in comics - debut: Hilda, Pusheen, Superior
- 2011 in comics - debut:
- 2012 in comics - debut: Nimona, Phoebe and Her Unicorn, Think Tank, Whispers
- 2013 in comics - debut:
- 2014 in comics - debut: My Hero Academia, Gudetama
- 2015 in comics - debut:
- 2016 in comics - debut:
- 2017 in comics - debut:
- 2018 in comics - debut: Tap Dance Killer, Chainsaw Man
- 2019 in comics - debut:
- 2020 in comics - debut: Rosebuds, Oshi no Ko
- 2021 in comics
- 2022 in comics
- 2023 in comics
- 2024 in comics
- 2025 in comics

== 2026–present ==
- 2026 in comics

== See also ==
- List of superhero debuts
- List of supervillain debuts
- Table of years in comics
