= 1964 in comics =

Notable events of 1964 in comics.

== Publications ==
=== January ===
- January 1: Jaxon's God Nose makes its debut. It is one of the earliest underground comix.
- January 6: Jay Heavilin and Frank B. Johnson's Einstein makes its debut. It will run until 13 February 1965.
- January 10 - March 23: Berlin v. E.C. Publications, Inc.: The estates of Irving Berlin and other songwriters sue EC Comics over a parody in Mad Magazine special #11, but lose their case.
- January 11: The first issue of the British illustrated girls' magazine Jackie is published. It will run until 3 July 1993.
- January 23: in Pilote, first chapter of L'Œuf de Karamazout, by Jidehem, of the series Starter; Sophie makes her debut.
- January 24: The final issue of Hans G. Kresse's Eric de Noorman is published.
- January 28: in Le journal de Tintin, Belgian edition, debut of the sea adventures series Howard Flynn, by William Vance and Yves Duval.
- The Amazing Spider-Man (1963 series) #8 — Marvel Comics
- The Avengers (1963 series) #3 — Marvel Comics
- Fantastic Four (1961 series) #22 — Marvel Comics
- Journey into Mystery (1952 series) #100 — Marvel Comics
- Kid Colt Outlaw (1948 series) #114 — Marvel Comics
- Millie the Model (1945 series) #118 — Marvel Comics
- Sgt. Fury and his Howling Commandos (1963 series) #5 — Marvel Comics
- Strange Tales (1951 series) #116 — Marvel Comics
- Tales of Suspense (1959 series) #49 — Marvel Comics
- Tales to Astonish (1959 series) #51 — Marvel Comics
- Two-Gun Kid (1948 series) #67 — Marvel Comics
- Uncanny X-Men (1963 series) #3 — Marvel Comics

=== February ===
- February 8: in Topolino, Paperino fornaretto di Venezia (Donald Duck, the little Venice baker) by Osvaldo Pavese and Giovan Battista Carpi, parody of Francesco Dall’Ongaro’s play Fornaretto.
- February 18: in Le journal de Tintin, first chapter of L’honneur du Samourai, by Jean Graton.
- The Amazing Spider-Man (1963 series) #9 — Marvel Comics
- Fantastic Four (1961 series) #23 — Marvel Comics
- Journey into Mystery (1952 series) #101 — Marvel Comics
- Rawhide Kid (1955 series) #38 — Marvel Comics
- Patsy Walker (1945 series) #113 — Marvel Comics
- Strange Tales (1951 series) #117 — Marvel Comics
- Tales of Suspense (1959 series) #50 — Marvel Comics
- Tales to Astonish (1959 series) #52 — Marvel Comics
- In Almanacco Topolino, Zio Paperone e le bande rivali, by Pier and Giovan Battista Carpi; debut of Ottoperotto.

=== March ===
- March 5: Marcel Remacle's Hultrasson makes its debut.
- March 11: Carlo Porciani and Mario Faustinelli's Kolosso makes its debut.
- The Amazing Spider-Man (1963 series) #10 — Marvel Comics
- The Avengers (1963 series) #4 — first Silver Age Captain America - Marvel Comics
- Fantastic Four (1961 series) #24 — Marvel Comics
- Journey into Mystery (1952 series) #102 — Marvel Comics
- Kid Colt Outlaw (1948 series) #115 — Marvel Comics
- Millie the Model (1945 series) #119 — Marvel Comics
- Sgt. Fury and his Howling Commandos (1963 series) #6 — Marvel Comics
- Strange Tales (1951 series) #118 — Marvel Comics
- Tales of Suspense (1959 series) #51 — Marvel Comics
- Tales to Astonish (1959 series) #53 — Marvel Comics
- Two-Gun Kid (1948 series) #68 — Marvel Comics
- Uncanny X-Men (1963 series) #4 — Marvel Comics
- In Uncle Scrooge 46, The many faces of Magica De Spell by Carl Barks.

=== April ===
- April 1: In the 119th issue of Mad Al Jaffee's Mad Fold-in makes its debut.
- April 30: in Pilote, first chapter of Tonnerre a l’Ouest, by Jean-Michel Charlier and Jean Giraud, second adventure of Blueberry.
- Richard E. Hughes and Ogden Whitney's Herbie Popnecker, who debuted in 1958, is first published as its own title.
- The Amazing Spider-Man (1963 series) #11 — Marvel Comics
- Daredevil (1964 series) #1 — Marvel Comics
  - First appearance of Daredevil
- Fantastic Four (1961 series) #25 — Marvel Comics
- Fantastic Four Annual (1963 series) #2 — Marvel Comics
- Journey into Mystery (1952 series) #103 — Marvel Comics
- Patsy Walker (1945 series) #114 — Marvel Comics
- Rawhide Kid (1955 series) #39 — Marvel Comics
- Strange Tales (1951 series) #119 — Marvel Comics
- Tales of Suspense (1959 series) #52 — Marvel Comics
- Tales to Astonish (1959 series) #54 — Marvel Comics
- Ginko attacks, written by the Giussani sisters, 16th album of the Diabolik series, it inspires the homonymous movie

=== May ===
- May 16: Malcolm Judge's Billy Whizz makes its debut in The Beano.
- May 23: The final episode of Philip Mendoza's The Adventures of Katie Country Mouse is published.
- The Amazing Spider-Man (1963 series) #12 — Marvel Comics
- The Avengers (1963 series) #5 — Marvel Comics
- Detective Comics #327
  - Writer John Broome and artist Carmine Infantino begin the "New Look" Batman and Robin and give the character a more detective-oriented direction
- Fantastic Four (1961 series) #26 — Marvel Comics
- Journey into Mystery (1952 series) #104 — Marvel Comics
- Kid Colt Outlaw (1948 series) #116 — Marvel Comics
- Millie the Model (1945 series) #120 — Marvel Comics
- Sgt. Fury and his Howling Commandos (1963 series) #7 — Marvel Comics
- Strange Tales (1951 series) #120 — Marvel Comics
- Tales of Suspense (1959 series) #53 — Marvel Comics
- Tales to Astonish (1959 series) #55 — Marvel Comics
- Two-Gun Kid (1948 series) #69 — Marvel Comics
- Uncanny X-Men (1963 series) #5 — Marvel Comics

=== June ===
- June 11: Mike Roy's Akwas makes its debut. It will run until 28 March 1965.
- June 20: The first issue of the British comics magazine Wham! is published and will run until 13 January 1968. In the first issue Leo Baxendale's Eagle-Eye, Junior Spy makes its debut.
- June 20: first Sniffy daily strip, by George Fett (in 1973, the strip is renamed Norbert).
- June 28: in Corriere dei Piccoli, L’ombra contro il generale, by Hugo Pratt and Alberto Ongaro; debut of the short-lived Italian superhero L’ombra (The shadow).
- The Amazing Spider-Man (1963 series) #13 — Marvel Comics
- Daredevil (1964 series) #2 — Marvel Comics
- Fantastic Four (1961 series) #27 — Marvel Comics
- Journey into Mystery (1952 series) #105 — Marvel Comics
- Patsy Walker (1945 series) #115 — Marvel Comics
- Rawhide Kid (1955 series) #40 — Marvel Comics
- Strange Tales (1951 series) #121 — Marvel Comics
- Tales of Suspense (1959 series) #54 — Marvel Comics
- Tales to Astonish (1959 series) #56 — Marvel Comics
- In Italy, Fantax (later renamed Fantasm), created by Furio Arrasich, makes his debut; it's the first of the several fumetti neri trying to emulate the Diabolik’s success.

=== July ===
- July 10: Nicholas Garland's Barry McKenzie makes its debut in the British satirical magazine Private Eye.
- July 11: In Leo Baxendale's Eagle-Eye, Junior Spy the villain Grimly Feendish makes his debut.
- July 12: Marcel Gotlib's Gai-Luron makes its debut in Vaillant.
- July 20: Eric Bradbury's Charlie Peace makes its debut.
- The Amazing Spider-Man (1963 series) #14 — Marvel Comics
- The Avengers (1963 series) #6 — Marvel Comics
- The Brave and the Bold #54 - The teaming of Robin, Kid Flash, and Aqualad by writer Bob Haney and artist Bruno Premiani led to the creation of the Teen Titans.
- Fantastic Four (1961 series) #28 — Marvel Comics
- Journey into Mystery (1952 series) #106 — Marvel Comics
- Kid Colt Outlaw (1948 series) #117 — Marvel Comics
- Millie the Model (1945 series) #121 — Marvel Comics
- Sgt. Fury and his Howling Commandos (1963 series) #8 — Marvel Comics
- Strange Tales (1951 series) #122 — Marvel Comics
- Tales of Suspense (1959 series) #55 — Marvel Comics
- Tales to Astonish (1959 series) #57 — Marvel Comics
- Two-Gun Kid (1948 series) #70 — Marvel Comics
- Uncanny X-Men (1963 series) #6 — Marvel Comics

=== August ===
- August 2 : in Topolino, The Health nut; Dick Kinney and Al Hubbard introduce Tabby, Donald Duck's cat, and Fethry Duck, a character who will become prominent in Donald Duck's comics.
- August 11 : in Le journal de Tintin, first chapter of L’hombre du camaleon, by André-Paul Duchâteau and Tibet.
- August 31: in Corriere dei piccoli, Il dottor Oss, by Mino Milani and Grazia Nidasio, inspired by Jules Verne's Dr. Ox's Experiment; the story (in images with explicative didascalies instead of balloons) has 6 sequels, till 1969.
- Max Bunker and Roberto Raviola (Magnus)'s Kriminal makes its debut. It will run until November 1974.
- The Amazing Spider-Man (1963 series) #15 — Marvel Comics
- The Avengers (1963 series) #7 — Marvel Comics
- Daredevil (1964 series) #3 — Marvel Comics
- Fantastic Four (1961 series) #29 — Marvel Comics
- Journey into Mystery (1952 series) #107 — Marvel Comics
- Patsy Walker (1945 series) #116 — Marvel Comics
- Rawhide Kid (1955 series) #41 — Marvel Comics
- Sgt. Fury and his Howling Commandos (1963 series) #9 — Marvel Comics
- Strange Tales (1951 series) #123 — Marvel Comics
- Tales of Suspense (1959 series) #56 — Marvel Comics
- Tales to Astonish (1959 series) #58 — Marvel Comics

=== September ===
- September 24: In Spirou, first chapter of L’escorte, by Goscinny and Morris.
- September 29: Quino's Mafalda makes its debut. It will run until 25 June 1973.
- The Amazing Spider-Man (1963 series) #16 — Marvel Comics
- The Amazing Spider-Man Annual (1964 series) #1 — Marvel Comics
- The Avengers (1963 series) #8 — Marvel Comics
- Fantastic Four (1961 series) #30 — Marvel Comics
- Journey into Mystery (1952 series) #108 — Marvel Comics
- Kid Colt Outlaw (1948 series) #118 — Marvel Comics
- Millie the Model (1945 series) #122 — Marvel Comics
- Sgt. Fury and his Howling Commandos (1963 series) #10 — Marvel Comics
- Strange Tales (1951 series) #124 — Marvel Comics
- Tales of Suspense (1959 series) #57 — Marvel Comics
- Tales to Astonish (1959 series) #59 — Marvel Comics
- Two-Gun Kid (1948 series) #71 — Marvel Comics
- Uncanny X-Men (1963 series) #7 — Marvel Comics
- In Almanacco Topolino, The Wheelers and Dealers, by Jim Fletcher; debut of Melody Mouse.

=== October ===
- October 3: The final issue of the British girls' comics magazine Girl is published.
- October 4: In Topolino, It's music? by Dick Kinney and Al Hubbard; debut of Hard Hard Moe.
- October 10: Il grande ricatto, by Angela and Luciana Giussani and Enzo Facciolo. Princess Altea of Vallenberg, the love interest of inspector Ginko, makes her debut.
- October 22 : in Pilote, first chapter of Asterix and the big fight, by Goscinny and Uderzo and of L’aigle solitaire (The lonely eagle) by Jean-Michel Charlier and Jean Giraud.
- October 26: Jan Green's comic strip Hey Swingy! is first published and will run until 1970.
- The Amazing Spider-Man (1963 series) #17 — Marvel Comics
- The Avengers (1963 series) #9 — Marvel Comics
- Daredevil (1964 series) #4 — Marvel Comics
- Fantastic Four (1961 series) #31 — Marvel Comics
- Journey into Mystery (1952 series) #109 — Marvel Comics
- Marvel Tales Annual (1964 series) #1 — Marvel Comics
- Millie the Model (1945 series) #123 — Marvel Comics
- Patsy Walker (1945 series) #117 — Marvel Comics
- Rawhide Kid (1955 series) #42 — Marvel Comics
- Sgt. Fury and his Howling Commandos (1963 series) #11 — Marvel Comics
- Strange Tales (1951 series) #125 — Marvel Comics
- Tales of Suspense (1959 series) #58 — Marvel Comics
- Tales to Astonish (1959 series) #60 — Marvel Comics

=== November ===
- November 3: in Le journal de Tintin, first chapter of Suspense à Indianapolis, by Jean Graton.
- November 4r first issue of Creepy (Warner Publishing)
- November 9: Brant Parker and Johnny Hart's The Wizard of Id makes its debut.
- November 11: Pat Tourret and Jenny Butterworth's Tiffany Jones makes its debut.
- November 12 : in Chouchou, L’Étoile endormie, first episode of the French sci-fi saga Les Naufragés du Temps, by Jean Claude Forest and Jean Gilon.
- Al Shapiro's Harry Chess makes his debut.
- The Amazing Spider-Man (1963 series) #18 — Marvel Comics
- The Avengers (1963 series) #10 — Marvel Comics
- Fantastic Four (1961 series) #32 — Marvel Comics
- Journey into Mystery (1952 series) #110 — Marvel Comics
- Kid Colt Outlaw (1948 series) #119 — Marvel Comics
- Millie the Model (1945 series) #124 — Marvel Comics
- Sgt. Fury and his Howling Commandos (1963 series) #12 — Marvel Comics
- Strange Tales (1951 series) #126 — Marvel Comics
  - First appearance of Clea
- Tales of Suspense (1959 series) #59 — Marvel Comics
- Tales to Astonish (1959 series) #61 — Marvel Comics
- Two-Gun Kid (1948 series) #72 — Marvel Comics
- Uncanny X-Men (1963 series) #8 — Marvel Comics

=== December ===
- December 1: The first issue of the Italian comics magazine Satanik is published and will run until 1974. In its first issue Max Bunker and Roberto Raviola (Magnus)'s Satanik makes its debut.
- December 7: Mars Ravelo and Mars T. Santana's Lastikman makes its debut.
- December 17: Morris and Pierre Vankeer start an editorial in Spirou, which launches the enduring term Ninth Art for the comics medium.
- Pat Masulli's Sarge Steel (Charlton Comics) makes its debut.
- The Amazing Spider-Man (1963 series) #19 — Marvel Comics
- The Avengers (1963 series) #11 — Marvel Comics
- Daredevil (1964 series) #5 — Marvel Comics
- Fantastic Four (1961 series) #33 — Marvel Comics
- Journey into Mystery (1952 series) #111 — Marvel Comics
- Millie the Model (1945 series) #125 — Marvel Comics
- Patsy Walker (1945 series) #118 — Marvel Comics
- Rawhide Kid (1955 series) #43 — Marvel Comics
- Sgt. Fury and his Howling Commandos (1963 series) #13 — Marvel Comics
- Strange Tales (1951 series) #127 — Marvel Comics
- Tales of Suspense (1959 series) #60 — Marvel Comics
- Tales to Astonish (1959 series) #62 — Marvel Comics

== Births ==
- January 7: Aaron Lopresti, American comic book artist (DC Comics, Marvel Comics).

=== April ===
- April 1: Bill Oakley, American comics letterer (DC Comics, Marvel Comics), (d. 2004).

=== August ===
- August 11: Jim Lee, Korean-American comic book writer, artist, and publisher (X-Men, DC Comics).
- August 22: D. G. Chichester, American comic book writer (Daredevil, Nick Fury: Agent of S.H.I.E.L.D., Hardware).

=== November ===
- November 29: Robert L. Washington III, American comic book writer (Static, Shadow Cabinet, Extreme Justice), (d. 2012).

=== Specific date unknown ===
- Alisa Kwitney, American author and editor (Vertigo Comics).
- Dave Taylor, English comic book artist (Batman: Shadow of the Bat, Force Works, Judge Dredd).

== Deaths ==
=== January ===
- January 17: Percy Cocking, British comics artist (continued Weary Wilie and Tired Tim), dies at age 82.
- Specific date unknown: Glen Cravath, American comics artist and illustrator (Frank Buck), dies at age 66.

=== February ===
- February 9: Joe Farren, American comics artist (Hank and Knobs, Terry and Tacks), dies at age 79.
- February 10: Charlie Pease, British comics artist (Buck an' Nero, Mighty Monk, Plum and Duff, Dickie Duffer, Sally Sunshine and Her Shadow, Artie the Autograph Hunter, continued Billy Bunter and Casey Court), dies at age 59.
- February 14: Frans Brouwer, Dutch illustrator and comic artist (Krabbels and Klodders), dies at age 57.
- February 28: Jens R. Nilssen, Norwegian illustrator and comics artist (Smørbukk, Tuss og Troll, Haukepatruljen, Vangsgutane), dies at age 83.

=== March ===
- March 23: Helge Forsslund, Swedish comics artist (Filimon), dies at age 63.
- Specific date unknown: Bert Link, American comics artist (A Reel of Nonsense, That Little Game), dies at age 79.

=== May ===
- May 8: Carlos Clémen, Argentine comic artist, dies at age 51.
- May 19: Tom McNamara, American comics artist (Us Boys, comics for National Allied Publications), dies at age 78.

=== June ===
- June 26: Doris Slater, Canadian comics artist, painter and art educator (Penny's Diary), dies at age 47 in a car accident.

=== July ===
- July 1: Antonio Rubino, Italian comics artist, animator, playwright and poet (Quadratino, Italino), dies at age 84.
- July 9: Piet Broos, Dutch comics artist (Ali Baba), dies at age 53.
- July 14: Fred Hofmans, Dutch lithographer and comic artist (made comics for Het Weekblaadje voor de Roomse Jeugd), dies at age 68.
- July 10: Samuel Zagat, Lithuanian-American comics artist (Gimple Beinish the Matchmaker), dies at age 76.

=== August ===
- August 9: Fontaine Fox, American comics artist (Toonerville Folks), dies at age 80.
- August 10: Carlo Cossio, Italian animator and comics artist (Dick Fulmine), dies at age 57.
- August 26: Richard Thain, American comics artist (Lord Longbow), dies at age 78.
- August 29: Rube Grossman, American animator and comics artist (The Three Mousketeers and other funny animal comics), dies at age 51.

=== September ===
- September 1: Ray Burnley, American comics artist (Superman, Jimmy Olsen, Superboy), dies at age 61 or 62.
- September 17: Jean Ray, aka John Flanders, Belgian novelist and comics writer (wrote for Buth's Thomas Pips and text stories by Antoon Herckenrath, Gray Croucher, Rik Clément), dies at age 77.

=== November ===
- November 5: Mabel Lucie Attwell, British illustrator and comics artist (Wot A Life), dies at age 85.

=== December ===
- December 8: Percy Crosby, American comics artist (Skippy), dies at age 83.
- December 10: Bob Kuwahara, aka Bob Kay, Japanese-American animator and comics artist (Disney comics, Miki, Marvelous Mike, ghosted Barker Bill's Cartoon Show), dies at age 63.
- December 16: Phil Davis, American comics artist (Mandrake the Magician), dies at age 58 from a heart attack.
- December 28: Cliff Sterrett, American comics artist (Polly and Her Pals), dies at age 81.

=== Specific date unknown ===
- Al Carreno, Mexican comics artist, dies at age 58 or 59.
- Yves Marie Marcel De Jaegher, French illustrator and comics artist, dies at age 84 or 85.
- Guy Depière, Belgian advertising artist, publisher and comics artist (publisher of comic magazines Bimbo and Jeep), dies at an unknown age.
- C. M. Payne, American comics artist (S'Matter, Pop?), dies at age 92 or 93.

== Conventions ==
- March 21–22: "Alley Tally" (Detroit, Michigan) — organized by Jerry Bails at Bails' house with the purpose of counting "the Alley Award ballots for 1963;" attendees include Ronn Foss, Don Glut, Don and Maggie Thompson, Mike Vosburg, and Grass Green. Serves as a precursor to the Detroit Triple Fan Fair, which debuts in 1965.
- May 9–10: Unnamed convention (Chicago, Illinois) — "several dozen" attendees; dealer room and film showings
- May 24: Unnamed convention (Hotel Tuller, Detroit, Michigan) — organized by teenagers Robert Brusch and Dave Szurek; c. 80 attendees; dealer room and film showings
- July 24: Tri-State Con a.k.a. "New York Comicon" (Workman's Circle Building, New York City) — one-day convention organized by 16-year-old Bernie Bubnis and fellow enthusiast Ron Fradkin, c. 100 attendees; official guests include Steve Ditko, Flo Steinberg, and Tom Gill. Considered to be the first true comics convention.

== Awards ==
=== National Cartoonists Society Division Awards ===
- Newspaper Comic Strips (Humor): Short Ribs, by Frank O'Neal
- Newspaper Comic Strips (Story): Prince Valiant, by Hal Foster
- Newspaper Panel Cartoons: Grin and Bear It, by George Lichty
- Gag Cartoons: Eldon Dedini
- Comic Books: Paul Fung Jr.
- Advertising and Illustration: Dick Hodgins, Jr.
- Editorial Cartoons: John Fischetti
- Sports Cartoons: Willard Mullin
- Reuben Award: Peanuts, by Charles M. Schulz

== First issues by title ==
=== Marvel Comics ===
- Daredevil

Release: April. Writer: Stan Lee. Artist: Bill Everett

=== DC Comics ===
- Vril Dox, in Superman #167 (February)
- Time Trapper, in Adventure Comics #317 (February)
- Nura Nal, in Adventure Comics #317 (February)
- Monsieur Mallah, in Doom Patrol #86 (March)
- Mr. Nobody, in Doom Patrol #86 (March)
- Brain, in Doom Patrol #86 (March)
- T. O. Morrow, in The Flash #143 (March)
- Madame Rouge, in Doom Patrol #86 (March)
- Black Hand, in Green Lantern #29 (June)
- Dan Garret, in Blue Beetle #1 (June)
- Mister Twister, in Brave and Bold #54 (July)
- Katma Tui, in Green Lantern #30 (July)
- Ultraman, in Justice League of America #29 (August)
- Power Ring, in Justice League of America #29 (August)
- Johnny Quick, in Justice League of America #29 (August)
- Superwoman, in Justice League of America #29 (August)
- Owlman, in Justice League of America #29 (August)
- Spider Girl, in Action Comics #323 (August)
- Beast Boy, in Adventure Comics #324 (September)
- Duplicate Boy, in Adventure Comics #324 (September)
- Mento, in Doom Patrol #91 (November)
- Garguax, in Doom Patrol #91 (November)
- Zatanna, in Hawkman #4 (November)
- Timber Wolf, in Adventure Comics #327 (December)
- Sarge Steel, in Sarge Steel #1 (December)
- Brain Storm, in Justice League of America #32 (December)

=== Other publishers ===
The Adventures of Jesus

Release: Spring by Gilbert Shelton. Writer/Artist: Foolbert Sturgeon

God Nose

Release: Fall by Jaxon. Writer/Artist: Jaxon
