= 1961 in comics =

Notable events of 1961 in comics.

== Publications ==
=== Year overall ===
- National Periodical Publications was publicly traded on the stock market.

=== January ===
- January 5: In Spirou, the first chapter of the Lucky Luke story Les Rivaux de Painful Gulch, by René Goscinny and Morris is published.
- January 15 : Donald's Odyssey, by Guido Martina and Pier Lorenzo De Vita, a parody of the Odyssey, with Donald Duck as Odysseus, is first prepublished in Topolino.
- January 21: In Le Parisien Libere, the first chapter of the Lucky Luke story Les Dalton sur le sentier de guerre, by René Goscinny and Morris is published.
- January 25: The first issue of the British comics magazine The Victor is published. It will run until 21 November 1992.
- Gunsmoke Western (1955 series) #62 - Marvel Comics
- Journey into Mystery (1952 series) #64 - Marvel Comics
- Kid Colt Outlaw (1948 series) #96 - Marvel Comics
- Spy vs. Spy by Antonio Prohías debuts in Mad Magazine.
- Strange Tales (1951 series) #80 - Marvel Comics
- Tales of Suspense (1959 series) #13 - Marvel Comics
- Tales to Astonish (1959 series) #15 - Marvel Comics
- Western Comics (1948 series), with issue #85 (January/February cover date) canceled by DC
- Editoriale Dardo publishes the first issue of the Italian series Falco Bianco (White Hawk), by Onofrio Bramante, set in Canada during the French and Indian Wars.

=== February ===
- February 12: In Topolino, The secret of success, by Romano Scarpa is first prepublished, which marks the debut of Jubal Pomp.
- February 18: The British comics magazine Radio Fun ends its run and merges with Buster.
- February 25: Bert Felstead's Leo the Friendly Lion debuts.
- February 26: Topolino imperatore della Calidornia (Mickey, Calisota’s imperator), by Romano Scarpa in Topolino.
- Journey into Mystery (1952 series) #65 - Marvel Comics
- Rawhide Kid (1955 series) #20 - Marvel Comics
- Strange Tales (1951 series) #81 - Marvel Comics
- Tales of Suspense (1959 series) #14 - Marvel Comics
- Tales to Astonish (1959 series) #16 - Marvel Comics
- Two-Gun Kid (1948 series) #58 - Marvel Comics

=== March ===
- March 6: In Charles M. Schulz's Peanuts Frieda makes her debut.
- March 18: The first issue of the British comics magazine Bimbo is published. It will run until 22 January 1972. In the first issue Bob Dewar's Bimbo makes its debut.
- Journey into Mystery (1952 series) #66 - Marvel Comics
- Kid Colt Outlaw (1948 series) #97 - Marvel Comics
- Strange Tales (1951 series) #82 - Marvel Comics
- Tales of Suspense (1959 series) #15 - Marvel Comics
- Tales to Astonish (1959 series) #17 - Marvel Comics

=== April ===
- April 1: Eric Roberts' Winker Watson debuts in the British comics magazine The Dandy.
- April 2: The first issue of the Italian Western series Dick Cheyenne, by Renzo Barbieri and Edgardo Dall’Acqua by Editoriale Dardo is published.
- April 28: The first issue of Radar, by Tristano Torelli and Franco Donatelli is published, a rare example of a super-hero comics by Italian authors.
- Adventure Comics #283 - DC Comics. It features the debut of General Zod.
- Batman #139 - DC Comics. It features the debut of Betty Kane who takes on the persona of Batgirl.
- Journey into Mystery (1952 series) #67 - Marvel Comics
- Rawhide Kid (1955 series) #21 - Marvel Comics
- Strange Tales (1951 series) #83 - Marvel Comics
- Tales of Suspense (1959 series) #16 - Marvel Comics
- Tales to Astonish (1959 series) #18 - Marvel Comics
- Two-Gun Kid (1948 series) #59 - Marvel Comics

=== May ===
- May 11: Maurice Rosy's and Paul Deliège's Bobo makes its debut in a mini–récit (mini-story) in Spirou magazine.
- May 18: The first episode of Asterix and the Goths by Goscinny and Uderzo is prepublished in Pilote.
- Journey into Mystery (1952 series) #68 - Marvel Comics
- Kid Colt Outlaw (1948 series) #98 - Marvel Comics
- Strange Tales (1951 series) #84 - Marvel Comics
- Tales of Suspense (1959 series) #17 - Marvel Comics
- Tales to Astonish (1959 series) #19 - Marvel Comics

=== June ===
- June 15: Sergio Bonelli and Gallieno Ferri's Zagor and his partner Cico makes their debut with the story The Forest of Ambushes.
- June 18: The Italian Donald Duck story Paperino e Il Calumet della Pace (Donald and The Ceremonial Pipe), by Luciano Bottaro is prepublished in Topolino. It marks the comeback of Joe Piper, twenty years after his creation by Floyd Gottfredson.
- June 20- June 21: Australian comic artist Len Lawson (of The Lone Avenger fame) who, between 1954 and 1961, had already been jailed after being sentenced for rape and assault, rapes and murders another young woman in his apartment, then holds a group of school children at ransom, shooting one of them dead. He is arrested and sentenced to life in 1962.
- June 22: The first episode of the Lucky Luke story Billy the Kid by René Goscinny and Morris is prepublished in Spirou.
- Amazing Adventures (1961 series) #1 - Marvel Comics
- Journey into Mystery (1952 series) #69 - Marvel Comics
- Rawhide Kid (1955 series) #22 - Marvel Comics
- Strange Tales (1951 series) #85 - Marvel Comics
- Tales of Suspense (1959 series) #18 - Marvel Comics
- Tales to Astonish (1959 series) #20 - Marvel Comics

=== July ===
- July 1: The first episode of the Dutch funny animal comic Wipperoen (Whipper in English) by Raymond Bär von Hemmersweil and Jan van Reek is published. The series will run until 1974.
- July 4: In Tintin magazine the first episodes of the Adventures of Tintin story The Castafiore Emerald, by Hergé and of La trahison de Steve Warson, by Jean Graton.are prepublished.
- All-Star Western (vol. 1), with issue #119, canceled by DC
- Amazing Adventures (1961 series) #2 - Marvel Comics
- Journey into Mystery (1952 series) #70 - Marvel Comics
- Kid Colt Outlaw (1948 series) #99 - Marvel Comics
- Strange Tales (1951 series) #86 - Marvel Comics
- Tales of Suspense (1959 series) #19 - Marvel Comics
- Tales to Astonish (1959 series) #21 - Marvel Comics
- First issue of Geppo (Bianconi)

=== August ===
- Amazing Adventures (1961 series) #3 - Marvel Comics
- Dell Giant # 48
  - First appearance in comics of The Flintstones. In the year, they get too a syndicated strip (October) and a magazine named after them (December).
- Journey into Mystery (1952 series) #71 - Marvel Comics
- Rawhide Kid (1955 series) #23 - Marvel Comics
- Strange Tales (1951 series) #87 - Marvel Comics
- Tales of Suspense (1959 series) #20 - Marvel Comics
- Tales to Astonish (1959 series) #22 - Marvel Comics

=== September ===
- September 25: The first episode of Harry Mace's Amy comic strip is published. It will run until 1991.
- Amazing Adventures (1961 series) #4 — Marvel Comics
- The Flash #123 — DC Comics; the "Flash of Two Worlds" story introduces Earth-Two, and more generally the concept of the multiverse, to DC Comics.
- Help! #12 — Warren Publishing; the final issue of vol. 1
- Journey into Mystery (1952 series) #72 — Marvel Comics
- Kid Colt Outlaw (1948 series) #100 — Marvel Comics
- Strange Tales (1951 series) #88 — Marvel Comics
- Tales of Suspense (1959 series) #21 — Marvel Comics
- Tales to Astonish (1959 series) #23 — Marvel Comics
- Uncle Scrooge (1953 series) #35 — Dell; featuring "Gift Lion" by Carl Barks
- The classic Little Archie story The Long Walk (issue #20), scripted by Bob Bolling, is published.

=== October ===
- October 16: Mort Walker and Jerry Dumas' Sam's Strip makes its debut. It will run until 1963.
- Amazing Adventures (1961 series) #5 - Marvel Comics
- Journey into Mystery (1952 series) #73 - Marvel Comics
- The Lighter Side of... by Dave Berg debuts in Mad Magazine.
- Rawhide Kid (1955 series) #24 - Marvel Comics
- Showcase #34 - DC Comics. It features the debut of Gardner Fox', Gil Kane's and Murphy Anderson's Atom.
- Strange Tales (1951 series) #89 - Marvel Comics
- Tales of Suspense (1959 series) #22 - Marvel Comics
- Tales to Astonish (1959 series) #24 - Marvel Comics.
- Asterix le gaulois, first album of the Asterix series.

=== November ===
- November 19: In Charles M. Schulz' Peanuts Little Red-Haired Girl makes her debut.
- November 22: The Lucky Luke adventure Les collines noires by Goscinny and Morris is prepublished in Spirou.
- Fantastic Four (1961 series) #1 - Marvel Comics
  - First appearance of the Fantastic Four (Mister Fantastic, Invisible Woman, Human Torch and the Thing)
- Amazing Adventures (1961 series) #6 - Marvel Comics
- Journey into Mystery (1952 series) #74 - Marvel Comics
- Kid Colt Outlaw (1948 series) #101 - Marvel Comics
- Strange Tales (1951 series) #90 - Marvel Comics
- Tales of Suspense (1959 series) #23 - Marvel Comics
- Tales to Astonish (1959 series) #25 - Marvel Comics

=== December ===
- In the Uncle Scrooge story The Midas Touch by Carl Barks the evil sorceress Magica De Spell and the Scrooge's secretary Miss Typefast make their debut. The same month billionaire John D. Rockerduck makes his debut too, in the story Boat Buster.
- Action Comics #283 - DC Comics
- Adventure Comics #291 - DC Comics
- Adventures into the Unknown #129 (December 1961-January 1962) - American Comics Group
- Adventures of Bob Hope #72 (December 1961-January 1962) - DC Comics
- Amazing Adult Fantasy (1961 series) #7 renamed from Amazing Adventures - Marvel Comics
- Journey into Mystery (1952 series) #75 - Marvel Comics
- Rawhide Kid (1955 series) #25 - Marvel Comics
- Strange Tales (1951 series) #91 - Marvel Comics
- Tales of Suspense (1959 series) #24 - Marvel Comics
- Tales to Astonish (1959 series) #26 - Marvel Comics

=== Specific date unknown ===
- The final episode of William McCleery and Ralph Fuller's Oaky Doaks is published.

== Births ==
=== October ===
- Kazuki Takahashi, Japanese manga artist and author of Yu-Gi-Oh! (died 2022)

=== Specific date unknown ===
- Si Spencer, British TV writer and comics writer (Harke & Burr, The Creep, wrote for Judge Dredd), (d. 2021).

== Deaths ==
=== January ===
- January 10: Dashiel Hammett, American detective novelist and scriptwriter (Secret Agent X-9), dies at age 66.

=== February ===
- February 11: Kate Carew, American caricaturist and comics artist (The Angel Child), dies at age 91.
- February 27: Nate Collier, American animator, illustrator and comics artist (Our Own Movies, Kelly Kids, Can It Be Done?, The Professor), dies at age 77.

=== April ===
- April 1: William Sharp, Austrian-American comic artist (made newspaper comic adaptations of novels), dies at age 60.

=== May ===
- Specific date unknown: Art Krenz, American writer and sports cartoonist, dies at age 55 or 56.

=== June ===
- June 2: Chéri Hérouard, French illustrator and comics artist (drew comics for La Semaine de Suzette and La Vie Parisienne), dies at age 80.
- June 30: Félix Jobbe-Duval, French illustrator and comics artist, dies at age 82.

=== July ===
- July 20: Wilson McCoy, American comics artist (continued The Phantom), dies at age 59.

=== August ===
- August 9: Joseph Hémard, French illustrator and comics artist, dies at age 81.

=== September ===
- September 20: Nándor Honti, aka Bit, Hungarian painter, illustrator and comics artist (Nagyapó Mozgószínháza, Tréfás Természetrajz, Séta Álomországban), dies at age 83.
- Specific date in September unknown: Julius Stafford Baker (Sr.), British comics artist (Casey's Court, Tiger Tim), dies at age 91 or 92.

=== December ===
- December 6: Ralph O. Yardley, American comics artist (Have You Seen Alonzo?, Do You Remember?), dies at age 83.
- December 24: Charles Hamilton, aka Frank Richards, British novelist and comics writer (Billy Bunter), dies at age 85.
- December 31: Péricles, Brazilian comics artist (O Amigo da Onça), commits suicide at age 37.

=== Specific date unknown ===
- Bernard Dibble, American comics artist (Danny Dingle, Looy Dot Dope, assisted on Hawkshaw the Detective, continued The Captain and the Kids, Cynical Susie, Fritzi Ritz, worked for Quality Comics), dies at age 61 or 62.
- Max A. Otto, German comics artist (Stups), dies at age 61.
- Raúl Roux, Uruguayan-Argentine comics artist (Rulito, el Gato Atorrante, Hombres qua han Conquistado Fama, Fiero a Fierro, Cuentos de Fogón, Lanza Seca), dies at age 59.

== Initial appearances by character name ==
=== DC Comics ===
- Atom (Ray Palmer) in Showcase #34 (October)
- Bette Kane in Batman #139 (April)
- Bouncing Boy in Action Comics #276 (May)
- Brainiac 5 in Action Comics #276 (May)
- Clayface (Matt Hagen) in Detective Comics #298 (December)
- Cosmic King in Superman #147 (August)
- Dev-Em in Adventure Comics #287 (August)
- Doctor Destiny in Justice League of America #5 (June)
- General Zod in Adventure Comics #283 (April)
- Haunted Tank in G.I. Combat #87 (May)
- Hawkman (Carter Hall) in The Brave and the Bold #37 (March)
- Hawkwoman in The Brave and the Bold #37 (March)
- Hector Hammond in Green Lantern #5 (April)
- Jean Loring in Showcase #34 (October)
- Kanjar Ro in Justice League of America #3 (February)
- Kobra (DC Comics) in Batman #139 (April)
- Lena Luthor in Superman's Girl Friend, Lois Lane #23 (February)
- Lightning Lord in Superman #147 (August)
- Luornu Durgo in Action Comics #276 (May)
- Mon-El in Superboy #89 (June)
- Pete Ross in Superboy #86 (January)
- Phantom Girl in Action Comics #276 (May)
- Salu Digby in Action Comics #276 (May)
- Saturn Queen in Superman #147 (August)
- Sinestro in Green Lantern #7 (August)
- Sue Dibny in The Flash #119 (March)
- Sun Boy in Action Comics #276 (May)
- Super-Chief in All-Star Western #117 (March)
- Thom Kallor in Action Comics #282 (March)
- Tomar-Re in Green Lantern #6 (May)
- Top in The Flash #122 (August)

=== Other publishers ===
- Cico, Mexican friend and comic sidekick of Zagor, in The forest of ambushes (June) - Bonelli
- John D. Rockerduck (December) - Disney
- Jubal Pomp (February) - Disney
- Ludwig Von Drake (September) - Disney
- Magica De Spell (December) - Disney
- Zagor, in The forest of the ambushes (June) - Bonelli
