= 1938 in comics =

Notable events of 1938 in comics.

== Events and publications ==
=== January ===
- January 24: In Ernie Bushmiller's Fritzi Ritz, Nancy first meets her sidekick friend Sluggo.
- Ace Comics (1937 series) #10 – David McKay Publications
- Detective Comics (1937 series) #11 – DC Comics
- Famous Funnies (1934 series) #42 – Eastern Color Printing
- Feature Funnies (1937 series) #4 – Comic Favorites, Inc.
- The Funnies #16 – Dell Comics
- Funny Pages (1937 series) #5 (16) - Ultem Publishing
- Funny Picture Stories (1937 series) #5 - Ultem Publishing
- More Fun Comics (1936 series) #28 – National Periodical Publications
- New Adventure Comics (1937 series) #23 – National Periodical Publications
- Star Comics (1937 series) #9 - Ultem Publishing
- Star Ranger Comics (1937 series) #9 - Ultem Publishing

=== February ===
- February 2: First publication of Bob Karp and Al Taliaferro's Donald Duck newspaper comic strip.
- February: Ultem Publishing was bought out by Centaur Publications.
- Ace Comics (1937 series) #11 – David McKay Publications
- Detective Comics (1937 series) #12 – DC Comics
- Famous Funnies (1934 series) #43 – Eastern Color Printing
- Feature Funnies (1937 series) #5 – Comic Favorites, Inc.
- More Fun Comics (1936 series) #29 – National Periodical Publications
- New Adventure Comics (1937 series) #24 – National Periodical Publications

=== March ===
- March 6: The first episode of Gervy's detective comic series Pat'Apouf is published. The series will eventually come to an end in 1990.
- March 17: In Bob Karp and Al Taliaferro's Donald Duck Donald's dog Bolivar makes his debut as a comics character, having debuted two years earlier in the animated short Alpine Climbers.
- March 22: The first issue of the Italian comics magazine Albi dell'Audace is published, which will run until 22 October 1939. In its first issue Vincenzo Baggioli and Carlo Cossio's Dick Fulmine makes its debut.
- March: Centaur Publications buys Ultem Publishing and takes over publishing for all Ultem titles.
- Ace Comics (1937 series) #12 – David McKay Publications
- Detective Comics (1937 series) #13 – DC Comics
- Famous Funnies (1934 series) #44 – Eastern Color Printing
- Feature Funnies (1937 series) #6 – Comic Favorites, Inc.
- Funny Pages (1937 series) #6 (17) - Centaur Publications
- Funny Picture Stories (1937 series) #6 - Centaur Publications
- More Fun Comics (1936 series) #30 – National Periodical Publications
- New Adventure Comics (1937 series) #25 – National Periodical Publications
- Star Comics (1937 series) #10 - Centaur Publications
- Star Ranger Comics (1937 series) #10 - Centaur Publications

=== April ===
- April 16: Arthur R. "Pop" Momand's newspaper comic strip Keeping Up with the Joneses comes to an end.
- April 21: First issue of the Belgian comics magazine Le Journal de Spirou is published. It features the debuts of the series Spirou by Rob-Vel and Les Aventures de Tif by Fernand Dineur.
- Ace Comics (1937 series) #13 – David McKay Publications
- Detective Comics (1937 series) #14 – DC Comics
- Famous Funnies (1934 series) #45 – Eastern Color Printing
- Feature Funnies (1937 series) #7 – Comic Favorites, Inc.
- Funny Pages (1937 series) #7 (18) - Centaur Publications
- Funny Picture Stories (1937 series) #7 - Centaur Publications
- Star Comics (1937 series) #11 - Centaur Publications
- Star Ranger Comics (1937 series) #11 - Centaur Publications

=== May ===
- May 9: In Bob Karp and Al Taliaferro's Donald Duck newspaper comic Gus Goose makes his debut.
- May: Ernie Bushmiller's Fritzi Ritz is retitled Nancy.
- Ace Comics (1937 series) #14 – David McKay Publications
- Detective Comics (1937 series) #15 – DC Comics
- Famous Funnies (1934 series) #46 – Eastern Color Printing
- Feature Funnies (1937 series) #8 - Comic Favorites, Inc.
- Funny Pages (1937 series) #8 (19) - Centaur Publications
- Funny Picture Stories (1937 series) #8 - Centaur Publications
- More Fun Comics (1935 series) #31 – National Periodical Publications
- New Adventure Comics (1937 series) #26 – National Periodical Publications
- Star Comics (1937 series) #12 - Centaur Publications
- Star Ranger Comics (1937 series) #12 - Centaur Publications

=== June ===
- June 4: Debut of Bernard Graddon's newspaper comic Just Jake in The Daily Mirror. It will run until 1952.
- Ace Comics (1937 series) #15 – David McKay Publications
- Action Comics (1938 series) #1 – DC Comics: This marks the first appearance of Jerry Siegel and Joe Shuster's Superman.
- Detective Comics (1937 series) #16 - DC Comics
- Famous Funnies (1934 series) #47 - Eastern Color Printing
- Feature Funnies (1937 series) #9 - Comic Favorites, Inc.
- More Fun Comics (1935 series) #32 - National Periodical Publications
- New Adventure Comics (1937 series) #27 – National Periodical Publications

=== July ===
- July 1: In Bob Karp and Al Taliaferro's newspaper comic Donald Duck Donald's iconic red car is first seen.
- July 7: The first episode of the Mickey Mouse comic strip The Plumber's Helper, by Floyd Gottfredson and Merrill De Maris is published, which marks the debut of Detective Casey and Joe Piper.
- July 30: First issue of the long-running British comics magazine The Beano, featuring debuts of Dudley D. Watkins' Lord Snooty, James Jewell's Wee Peem, The Dinelli Brothers' Tin-Can Tommy, Basil Blackaller's Hairy Dan, Hugh McNeill's Ping the Elastic Man, Eric Roberts' Helpful Henry and Reg Carter's Big Eggo.
- July: Centaur Publications renames Star Ranger Comics to Cowboy Comics starting with issue 13.
- Ace Comics (1937 series) #16 - David McKay Publications
- Action Comics (1938 series) #2 – DC Comics
- Cowboy Comics (1937 series) #13 - Centaur Publications
- Detective Comics (1937 series) #17 - DC Comics
- Famous Funnies (1934 series) #48 - Eastern Color Printing
- Feature Funnies (1937 series) #10 - Comic Favorites, Inc.
- Funny Pages (1937 series) #9 (20) - Centaur Publications
- Funny Picture Stories (1937 series) #9 - Centaur Publications
- More Fun Comics (1935 series) #33 - National Periodical Publications
- New Adventure Comics (1937 series) #28 – National Periodical Publications
- Star Comics (1937 series) #13 - Centaur Publications

=== August ===
- August 4: Hergé's Tintin story King Ottokar's Sceptre is prepublished in Le Petit Vingtième. Halfway the story opera diva Bianca Castafiore makes her debut.
- August 13: The final issue of the Flemish comics magazine Ons Kinderland is published.
- Ace Comics (1937 series) #17 - David McKay Publications
- Action Comics (1938 series) #3 - DC Comics
- Amazing Mystery Funnies (1938 series) #1 – Centaur Publications
- Cowboy Comics (1937 series) #14 - Centaur Publications
- Detective Comics (1937 series) #18 - DC Comics
- Famous Funnies (1934 series) #49 - Eastern Color Printing
- Feature Funnies (1937 series) #11 - Comic Favorites, Inc.
- More Fun Comics (1935 series) #34 - National Periodical Publications
- New Adventure Comics (1937 series) #29 – National Periodical Publications

=== September ===
- Ace Comics (1937 series) #18 - David McKay Publications
- Action Comics (1938 series) #4 - DC Comics
- Amazing Mystery Funnies (1938 series) #2 - Centaur Publications
- Detective Comics (1937 series) #19 - DC Comics
- Famous Funnies (1934 series) #50 - Eastern Color Printing
- Feature Funnies (1937 series) #12 - Comic Favorites, Inc.
- Funny Pages (1937 series) #10 (21) - Centaur Publications
- Funny Picture Stories (1937 series) #10 - Centaur Publications
- Jumbo Comics #1 - Fiction House: Fiction House's Real Adventures Publishing Company imprint. It marks the U.S. debut of Will Eisner, Jerry Iger and Mort Meskin's Sheena, Queen of the Jungle, who debuted in January 1937 in the British magazine Wags.
- More Fun Comics (1935 series) #35 - National Periodical Publications
- New Adventure Comics (1937 series) #30 - National Periodical Publications
- Star Comics (1937 series) #14 - Centaur Publications

=== October ===
- October 15: First issue of the British comics magazine Radio Fun, which will run until 1961.
- October: Centaur Publications changes the name of Cowboy Comics to Star Ranger Funnies starting with issue 15.
- Ace Comics (1937 series) #19 - David McKay Publications
- Action Comics (1938 series) #5 - DC Comics
- Detective Comics (1937 series) #20 - DC Comics
- Famous Funnies (1934 series) #51 - Eastern Color Printing
- Feature Funnies (1937 series) #13 - Comic Favorites, Inc.
- More Fun Comics (1935 series) #36 - National Periodical Publications
- New Adventure Comics (1937 series) #31 - National Periodical Publications
- Star Ranger Funnies (1937 series) #15 - Centaur Publications, Final Issue

=== November ===
- November 6: Stephen Slesinger and Fred Harman's Red Ryder is first published in the newspapers.
- November 13: In Fascist Italy the importation and translation of all American and British comic books, except for the far too popular Mickey Mouse is outlawed. This also means the end of Italian comics magazine Jumbo.
- Ace Comics (1937 series) #20 - David McKay Publications
- Action Comics (1938 series) #6 - DC Comics
- Adventure Comics (previously New Adventure Comics) (1937 series) #32 – DC Comics
- Amazing Mystery Funnies (1938 series) #3 - Centaur Publications
- Detective Comics (1937 series) #21 - DC Comics
- Famous Funnies (1934 series) #52 - Eastern Color Printing
- Feature Funnies (1937 series) #14 - Comic Favorites, Inc.
- Funny Pages (1937 series) #11 (22) - Centaur Publications
- Funny Picture Stories (1937 series) #11 - Centaur Publications
- More Fun Comics (1935 series) #37 - National Periodical Publications
- Star Comics (1937 series) #15 - Centaur Publications

=== December ===
- December: As a result of the Spanish Civil War it becomes more difficult to find the materials needed to publish the Spanish illustrated children's magazine En Patufet and thus its final issue appears. It will briefly be revived between 1968 and 1973.
- December 17: The first appearance of Hugh McNeill's Pansy Potter, one of the longest running comic strips in The Beano.
- December 18: Date of the first edition of Polish Mickey Mouse comic Gazetka Miki.
- Ace Comics (1937 series) #21 - David McKay Publications
- Action Comics (1938 series) #7 - DC Comics
- Adventure Comics (1937 series) #33 – DC Comics
- Amazing Mystery Funnies (1938 series) #4 - Centaur Publications
- Detective Comics (1937 series) #22 - DC Comics
- Famous Funnies (1934 series) #53 - Eastern Color Printing
- Feature Funnies (1937 series) #15 - Comic Favorites, Inc.
- Funny Pages (1937 series) #12 (23) - Centaur Publications
- More Fun Comics (1935 series) #38 - National Periodical Publications
- Star Comics (1937 series) #16 - Centaur Publications, Final Issue

=== Specials ===
- New Book of Comics (1937 series) #2 – National Periodical Publications

=== Specific date unknown ===
- William St. John Glenn creates Ballyscunnion, which will run until 1968.
- Arthur Warden creates Snowdrop's Zoo, which will run until 1955.
- Maurieta Wellman creates The G-Twins, written by Garry Cleveland Myers, which will later change its name to Goofus and Gallant.
- Kaneko Shigemasa publishes Shin Nipponto - Sho-chan no Boken.

== Births ==
=== January ===
- January 13: Cabu, French comic strip artist and caricaturist (Charlie Hebdo), (d. 2015)

=== June ===
- June 22: Fred Carter, American comic book artist, (d. 2022).

=== September ===
- September 3: Calvi, French cartoonist, (d. 2022).
- September 23: Jean-Claude Mézières, French comic artist (Valérian et Laureline), (d. 2022).
- September 26: Raoul Cauvin, Belgian comics writer (Les Tuniques Bleues, Sammy, Agent 212, Les Femmes en Blanc, Pierre Tombal, Cédric, Cupidon, Pauvre Lampil, Les Psy, Taxi Girl, Le Vieux Bleu, Les Voraces, also wrote stories for Natacha and Spirou et Fantasio), (d. 2022).

=== Specific date unknown ===
- hugOKÉ, Belgian cartoonist and comics artist (Belgman, Eddy Sterk Wint... De Spelen, Reynaert de Vos), (d. 2021).

== Deaths ==
=== January ===
- January 9: Johnny Gruelle, American cartoonist, children's book author, illustrator and comics artist (Mr. Twee Deedle, Raggedy Ann and Andy), dies at age 57.
- January 20: Émile Cohl, French animated film director, caricaturist and comics artist, dies at age 81.

=== February ===
- February 19: Foster Morse Follett, American comics artist (Tidy Teddy, Skeezicks, The Kid, Private Conscience), dies at age 59 after being involved in a car accident a week later.
- February: Bertram Lamb, British comics writer (Pip, Squeak and Wilfred), dies at age 50 or 51.

=== March ===
- March 6: Walt McDougall, American cartoonist, illustrator and comics artist (Queer Visitors from the Marvelous Land of Oz), commits suicide at age 80.
- March 8: Eugen Kirchner, German illustrator and comics artist, dies at age 73.

=== June ===
- June 2: Louis Morin, French illustrator, caricaturist, comics artist, novelist and painter, dies at age 82.
- June 6: Karl Theodor Zelger, a.k.a. K.T. Zelger, Austrian comics artist (continued Bilderbogen des kleinen Lebens), dies at age 49.

=== August ===
- August 11: Wilhelm Heinrich Detlev Körner, German-American comics artist (Hugo Hercules), dies at age 59.

=== September ===
- September 18: Johannes Kesler, Dutch painter, graphic artist and comics artist (made educational comics), dies at age 74.

=== October ===
- October: Roy L. Williams, American comics artist (Babe Bunting), dies at an unknown age.
- 13 October: E.C. Segar, American comics artist (Thimble Theatre, Popeye), dies at age 44.

=== November ===
- November 11: Fred Spencer, American animator and comics artist (Disney comics), dies at age 34 in a road accident.
- November 15: Harry Grant Dart, American illustrator and comics artist (The Explorigator), dies at age 79.
- November 18: Joan Llaverías, Spanish painter, illustrator and comics artist, dies at age 63.

=== Specific date unknown ===
- Harry Julius, Australian comics artist, animator, caricaturist and printmaker (The Bears Of Stringy Bark, The Egglets, The Crazy Crew of the Crayfish, Smiler, Mr. Gink – He Didn't Think!), dies at age 52 or 53.
- Will Spurrier, British comics artist (Birdie and Napoleon, Parker P.C.), dies at age 58 or 59.

== First issues by title ==
- Action Comics (June, DC Comics.)
- Comics on Parade (April, United Features Syndicate)
- Jumbo Comics (June, Fiction House)
- Amazing Mystery Funnies (August, Centaur Publications)
- The Beano (July, DC Thomson)

=== Renamed titles ===
- New Adventure Comics renamed Adventure Comics as of the November cover date.
- Star Ranger Comics renamed Cowboy Comics (July).
- Cowboy Comics renamed Star Ranger Funnies (October).

== Initial appearances by character name ==
- Lois Lane in Action Comics #1 (June), created by Jerry Siegel and Joe Shuster, published by National Periodical Publications.
- Superman (Earth-Two) in Action Comics #1 (June), created by Jerry Siegel and Joe Shuster, published by National Periodical Publications.
- Zatara in Action Comics #1 (June), created by Fred Guardineer, published by National Periodical Publications
- Jimmy Olsen in Action Comics #6 (November), created by Jerry Siegel and Joe Shuster, publisher by National Periodical Publications
- Crimson Avenger (Lee Travis) in Detective Comics #20 (October), created by Jim chambers, publisher by National Periodical Publications
- Tex Thompson in Action Comics #1 (June), created by Ken Fitch and Bernard Baily, published by National Periodical Publications
- Tigress (DC Comics) in Action Comics #1 (June), created by Fred Guardineer, published by National Periodical Publications
