= Barney Boko =

British comic strip

Barney Boko was a British comic strip series, drawn by John R. Mason, which was published in the British comics magazine The Dandy from 1937 to 1944. It was about a tramp whose incredibly long nose could be used for anything, from a Christmas tree to a bridge. It ran for seven years from the first issue in December 1937.
