= A-1 Comics =

A-1 Comics is a Golden Age comics publication that began in 1944 and ended in 1955, lasting 139 issues. Only the first 17 issues carried the title "A-1" on the cover. Issues #18 and up used the feature as the book title with different numbering. A-1 and its numbering continued to be used in the indicia. The series was used by owner Vincent Sullivan's Magazine Enterprises to try out a number of potential characters and titles, as well as reprinting newspaper strips such as Texas Slim, Kerry Drake and Teena. Several original A-1 titles succeeded and were given their own titles, including Tim Holt and The Ghost Rider. Issues were devoted to Thun'da, Cave Girl, and Strongman. Title that didn't do well included Dick Powell Adventurer, Fibber McGee and Molly, and Jimmy Durante Comics. The final issue was devoted to Bob Powell's Strongman.

== List of A-1 Comics and features ==
A-1 Comics was published at an irregular frequency. Issues would carry their own unique numbering, series titles, and frequencies in addition to the A-1 title and numbering. Some would continue titles and numbering from series that Magazine Enterprises had previously canceled.

- No Number [#1] Kerry Drake, Detective / Anthology (1944)
- No Number [#2] Anthology
- #3 Anthology (1946)
- #4 Texas Slim (1946)
- #5 Anthology (1946)
- #6 Anthology
- #7 Anthology
- #8 Anthology (1947)
- #9 Texas Slim (1947)
- #10 Anthology (1947)
- #11 Teena #1
- #12 Teena #2
- #13 Guns of Fact and Fiction (1948)
- #14 Tim Holt Western Adventures #1 (1948)
- #15 Teena #3 (1948)
- #16 Vacation Comics #1 (1948)
- #17 Tim Holt #2 (Sept.-Oct. 1948)
- #18 Jimmy Durante Comics #1 (Oct. 1948)
- #19 Tim Holt #3 (Nov.-Dec. 1948)
- #20 Jimmy Durante Comics #2 (Winter 1948-1949)
- #21 Joan of Arc (April 1949)
- #22 Star Parade Presents: Dick Powell, Adventurer (June 1949)
- #23 Cowboys and Indians #6 (July 1949)
- #24 "Trail" Colt, U.S. Marshal #1 (1949)
- #25 Star Parade Presents: Fibber McGee and Molly (1949)
- #26 "Trail" Colt, U.S. Marshal #2 (1949)
- #27 The Ghost Rider #1 (Aug. 1950)
- #28 The Adventures of Koko and Kola #6 (Nov. 1950)
- #29 The Ghost Rider #2 (Dec. 1950)
- #30 Jet Powers #1 (Jan. 1951)
- #31 The Ghost Rider #3 (1951)
- #32 Jet Powers #2 (1951)
- #33 Muggsy Mouse #1 (1951)
- #34 The Ghost Rider #4 (1951) *Contains a house ad for Tim Holt #23, April–May 1951
- #35 Jet Powers #3 (1951)
- #36 Muggsy Mouse #2 (1951)
- #37 The Ghost Rider #5 (1951)
- #38 Muggsy Mouse #3 (Aug.-Sept. 1951)
- #39 Jet Powers #4 (1951)
- #40 Dogface Dooley #1 (1951)
- #41 Cowboys 'n' Injuns #7 (1951)
- #42 Best of the West #1 (1951)
- #43 Dogface Dooley #2 (1951)
- #44 The Ghost Rider #6 (1951)
- #45 The American Air Forces #5 (1951)
- #46 Best of the West #2 (1951)
- #47 Thun'da, King of the Congo #1 (1952)
- #48 Cowboys 'n' Injuns #8 (1952)
- #49 Dogface Dooley #3 (1952)
- #50 Danger is Their Business #11 (1952)
- #51 The Ghost Rider #7 (1952) *One copy has the date March 13, 1952 stamped on the first page.
- #52 Best of the West #3 (1952)
- #53 Dogface Dooley #4 (1952)
- #54 The American Air Forces #6 (1952)
- #55 The United States Marines #5 (1952)
- #56 Thun'da, King of the Congo #2 (1952)
- #57 The Ghost Rider #8 (Aug. 1952) *Indicia states that Ghost Rider is published quarterly.
- #58 The American Air Forces #7 (Aug. 1952)
- #59 Best of the West #4 (Aug. 1952)
- #60 The United States Marines #6 (1952) *Indicia states that U.S. Marines is published quarterly.
- #61 Space Ace #5 (1952)
- #62 Undercover Girl #5 (1952)
- #63 Manhunt #13 (1952)
- #64 Dogface Dooley #5 (1952) *Indicia states that Dogface Dooley is published quarterly.
- #65 The American Air Forces #8 (Oct. 1952) *Indicia states that American Air Forces is published quarterly.
- #66 Best of the West #5 (Oct. 1952) *Indicia states that Best of the West is published quarterly.
- #67 The Ghost Rider #9 (Oct. 1952)
- #68 The United States Marines #7 (1952)
- #69 The American Air Forces #9 (Dec. 1952)
- #70 Best of the West #6 (Dec. 1952)
- #71 The Ghost Rider #10 (Dec. 1952)
- #72 The United States Marines #8 (1952)
- #73 Thun'da, King of the Congo #3 (1952)
- #74 The American Air Forces #10 (March 1953)
- #75 The Ghost Rider #11 (March 1953)
- #76 Best of the West #7 (March 1953)
- #77 Manhunt #14 (1953)
- #78 Thun'da, King of the Congo #4 (1953)
- #79 The American Air Forces #11 (May 1953)
- #80 The Ghost Rider #12 (May–June 1953)
- #81 Best of the West #8 (May–June 1953)
- #82 Cave Girl #11 (1953)
- #83 Thun'da, King of the Congo #5 (1953)
- #84 The Ghost Rider #13 (July–August 1953)
- #85 Best of the West #9 (July–August 1953)
- #86 Thun'da, King of the Congo #6 (1953)
- #87 Best of the West #10 (Sept.-Oct. 1953)
- #88 Bobby Benson's B-Bar-B Riders #20 (1953)
- #89 Home Run #3 (1953)
- #90 Red Hawk #11 (1953)
- #91 The American Air Forces #12
- #92 Dream Book of Romance #5 (1953)
- #93 Great Western #8 (1953)
- #94 White Indian #11 (1953)
- #95 Muggsy Mouse #4 (Oct.-Nov. 1953)
- #96 Cave Girl #12 (1953)
- #97 Best of the West #11 (Nov.-Dec. 1953)
- #98 Undercover Girl #6 (1953)
- #99 Muggsy Mouse #5 (1953)
- #100 Badmen of the West #1 (1953)
- #101 White Indian #12 (1954) *One copy is stamped Jan. 6, 1954 on the cover.
- #102 Dream Book of Romance #6 (April–June 1954)
- #103 Best of the West #12 (April–June 1954)
- #104 White Indian #13 (April–June 1954)
- #105 Great Western #9 (April–June 1954)
- #106 Dream Book of Love #1 (June–July 1954)
- #107 Hot Dog #1 (June–July 1954)
- #108 Red Fox #15 (1954)
- #109 Dream Book of Romance #7 (July-Aug. 1954)
- #110 Dream Book of Romance #8 (Sept.-Oct. 1954)
- #111 I'm a Cop #1 (1954)
- #112 The Ghost Rider #14 (1954)
- #113 Great Western #10 (July-Sept. 1954)
- #114 Dream Book of Love #2 (1954)
- #115 Hot Dog #2 (1954)
- #116 Cave Girl #13 (July-Sept. 1954)
- #117 White Indian #14 (July-Sept. 1954)
- #118 Undercover Girl #7 (1954)
- #119 Straight Arrow's Fury #1 (1954)
- #120 Badmen of the West #2 (1954)
- #121 Mysteries of Scotland Yard #1 (1954)
- #122 Black Phantom #1 (1954)
- #123 Dream Book of Love #3 (Oct.-Nov. 1954)
- #124 Hot Dog #3 (Oct.-Nov. 1954)
- #125 Cave Girl #14
- #126 I'm a Cop #2 (1954)
- #127 Great Western #11 (Oct.-Dec. 1954)
- #128 I'm a Cop #3 (1954)
- #129 The Avenger #1 (Feb.-March 1955)
- #130 Strong Man #1 (March–April 1955)
- #131 The Avenger #2 (April–May 1955)
- #132 Strong Man #2 (May–June 1955)
- #133 The Avenger #3 (June–July 1955)
- #134 Strong Man #3 (July-Aug. 1955)
- #135 White Indian #15 (1955)
- #136 Hot Dog #4 (1955)
- #137 Africa, Thrilling Land of Mystery #1 (1955)
- #138 The Avenger #4 (Aug.-Sept. 1955)
- #139 Strong Man #4 (Sept.-Oct. 1955)
