= Ralph O. Yardley =

American cartoonist

- Born: 1878; Stockton, California, U.S.
- Died: December 6, 1961; Stockton, California, U.S.
- Occupation: Cartoonist
- Children: 2 daughters

Ralph O. Yardley (1878 - December 6, 1961) was an American cartoonist who was described by The Honolulu Star-Bulletin as "one of America's widely-known cartoonists." Over the course of his 57-year career, his cartoons were published in The San Francisco Examiner, the Pacific Commercial Advertiser, later known as The Honolulu Advertiser), The New York Globe, and The Stockton Record.
