= 1950 in comics =

Notable events of 1950 in comics.

== Events and publications ==
=== January ===
- January 22: The final episode of Charles M. Schulz' Li'l Folks is published.
- January 30: The first episode of Mickey Mouse, Eega Beeva and the Mook Treasure by Bill Walsh and Floyd Gottfredson is published. The story, published at the height of the Cold War, is overly anti-communist and portrays the villain Peg-Leg Pete as a Soviet officer.
- In Walt Disney's Comics and Stories Carl Barks creates the Donald Duck story Rip Van Donald, a parody of Rip Van Winkle.
- Joker Comics (1942 series) #40 - Timely Comics

=== February ===
- February 9: Marc Sleen's version of De Lustige Kapoentjes makes its debut in 't Kapoentje.
- February 9: in Spirou, first strip of Les chapeaux noirs, by Andrè Franquin.
- February 10: first issue of Akim by Roberto Renzi and Augusto Pedrazza (Edizioni Tomasina).
- February 20: Elliot Caplin and John Cullen Murphy's Big Ben Bolt debuts.
- February 23: Bob De Moor's Monsieur Tric (Meester Mus) makes its debut in Tintin.
- Captain America's Weird Tales (1941 series) #75 – Timely Comics – (After issue 75, the series will be cancelled for 4 years and then rename back to Captain America Comics)
- Venus (1948 series) #8 – Timely Comics

=== March ===
- March 10: in Tintin magazine, the first chapter of Destination moon by Hergè appears in print.
- March 16: Barry Appleby's The Gambols makes its debut.
- March 21: Carl Barks' story Ancient Persia is published.
- March 23: In Tintin magazine the first chapter of The mystery of the great pyramid, by Edgar P. Jacobs appears in pint.
- March 31 : in Vaillant, debut of the series Jean et Jeannette, by Jacques Souriau, Jean Ollivier e Roger Lécureux, story of two French children in the Second World War.
- Syd Shores and Stan Lee's Tex Taylor is cancelled by Atlas with issue #9.
- Black Rider debuts with issue #8, taking over the numbering of Western Winners — Atlas Comics
- Cowboy Romances (1939 series) #3 – Timely Comics – Renamed to Young Men
- Foodini (1950 series) #1 - Helnit Publishing
- True Western (1939 series) #2 – Timely Comics – Renamed to True Adventures

=== April ===
- April 1: The Nero story De Hoed van Geeraard de Duivel is first published in the newspapers. Halfway the story the main cast member Madam Pheip makes her debut.
- April 8: Marc Sleen's Doris Dobbel makes its debut.
- April 14: The first issue of the British comics magazine Eagle is published. It will run (in two incarnations) until 1994. In its first issue Frank Hampson's Dan Dare and Frank Humpris' Jeff Anold make their debut.
- Crypt of Terror debuts with issue #17 (April/May cover date), continuing the numbering of Crime Patrol — EC Comics
- Foodini (1950 series) #2 - Helnit Publishing
- The Vault of Horror debuts with issue #12 (April/May cover date), continuing the numbering of War Against Crime — EC Comics
- Trail of the unicorn, by Carl Barks.
- Topolino e I grilli atomici (Mickey Mouse and the Atomic Crickets) by Guido Martina and Angelo Bioletto is first published in the Italian Disney comics magazine Topolino. In this story Mickey Mouse and Goofy meet the Seven Dwarfs.

=== May ===
- Andrea Lavezzolo and EsseGesse's Kinowa makes its debut.
- Weird Fantasy debuts with issue #13 (May/June cover date), continuing the numbering of A Moon, A Girl... Romance; analogously, The haunt of fear debuts with issue #15, continuing the numbering of Gunfighter and Weird science replaces Saddie Romances— EC Comics
- Foodini (1950 series) #3 - Helnit Publishing
- Joker Comics (1942 series) #41 - Timely Comics
- True Adventures (1939 series) #3 – Timely Comics – Renamed to Men's Adventures
- Venus (1948 series) #9 – Timely Comics

=== June ===
- June 28: first issue of Zenit, collection of Western comics made in Italy (Edizioni Audace)
- After having received a letter of complaint from Hilda Terry in October 1949 the National Cartoonists Society allows female cartoonists too as members. Terry, Barbara Shermund and Edwina Dumm are the first women to become members of their society.
- Cancellation of Gian Giacomo Dalmasso and Ingam (Enzo Magni)'s Pantera Bionda.
- Wild about flowers, by Carl Barks
- Young Men (1939 series) #4 – Timely Comics

=== July ===
- In The Haunt of Fear, the mascot character The Old Witch makes her debut, designed by Graham Ingels.
- In Four Color Comics, Carl Barks' Vacation time.
- July 27: Bob De Moor's Barelli makes his debut in Tintin.

=== August ===
- August 25: In the album The Blood Pact, Tex Willer marries the Indian squaw Lylith (who will die within a year).
- August 28: in a strip on L’Humanitè, Pif le chien meets for the first time his antagonist, the cat Hercule.
- Foodini (1950 series) #4 - Helnit Publishing, Final Issue
- Joker Comics (1942 series) #42 - Timely Comics, Final Issue
- Men's Adventures (1939 series) #4 – Timely Comics
- Strange Adventures #1 – DC Comics

=== September ===
- September 4: Mort Walker's Beetle Bailey makes its debut. Though the original comic strip is set at college and will only be set at a military base in March 1951.
- September 5: The Nero story Moea Papoea is first published in the newspapers. Halfway the story the main cast member Petoetje makes his debut.
- September 7: Hergé falls into a clinical depression and goes on a rest cure to Switzerland. For 18 months no new The Adventures of Tintin episodes appear in the eponymous Tintin magazine.
- September 14: In the Donald Duck story A Financial Fable by Carl Barks Scrooge McDuck is seen swimming in his money for the first time.
- September 15: The first issue of the Dutch comics magazine Grabbelton is published, a supplement of De Katholieke Illustratie. it will last until 4 September 1954.
- September 24: Kreigh Collins' Mitzi McCoy changes its title to Kevin the Bold. It will continue under this title until 1968, whereupon it changes to another title, Up Anchor, and continues until 1972.
- Young Men (1939 series) #5 – Timely Comics

=== October ===
- Tales from the Crypt debuts with issue #20 (October/November cover date), continuing the numbering of Crypt of Terror — EC Comics
- First issue of Boys’ ranch by Joe Simon and Jack Kirby (Harvey comics)
- In Vaillant, the PCF’s weekly magazine for the younger, Fils de Chine (Sons of China), by Roger Lécureux and Paul Gillon, a fictionalized account of the Long March.
- October 2: Charles M. Schulz' Peanuts appears for the first time in seven US newspapers. In the first episode Charlie Brown makes his debut (although he originated in Schulz' previous series Li'l Folks).
- October 4: In Charles M. Schulz' Peanuts the character Snoopy makes its debut.
- October 14: The first issue of the Belgian Disney comics magazine Mickey Magazine is published. It will run until September 1959.
- October 19: The Spirou et Fantasio story Il y a un sorcier à Champignac by André Franquin with Jean Darc is prepublished in Spirou and marks the debut of the Count of Champignac.

=== November ===
- November 13: Jack Kent's King Aroo makes its debut.
- November 27: Dick Brooks's The Jackson Twins makes its debut.
- Men's Adventures (1939 series) #5 – Timely Comics

=== December ===
- Marvel Boy (1950 series) #1 – Timely Comics
- Young Men (1939 series) #6 – Timely Comics

=== Specific date unknown ===
The U.S. comics industry comes to a turning point. The Golden Age of Comic Books is ending, and the rise of crime comics, romance comics, Western comics, horror comics, and science fiction comics signals the start of the new decade.

- In films, Destination Moon is the first color science fiction film, and the first big budget science fiction film since Things to Come in 1936. DC Comics is quick to pick up on the renewed interest of the public in science fiction, and a still from Destination Moon is cover of the new science fiction comic book Strange Adventures, soon joined by a companion book Mystery in Space.
- EC Comics is at the height of their brief trajectory, with science fiction comics Weird Science and Weird Fantasy.
- Dell Comics publishes a large number of Western comics, dedicated to celebrities such as Roy Rogers and Gene Autry.
- The comic strip reprint comics, which had started the comic book phenomenon, are disappearing. Ace Comics, Magic Comics, and King Comics end their long runs. Attempts to bring out single character comic strip reprints, such as Flash Gordon, Steve Canyon, and Terry and the Pirates fold after short runs.
- It rhymes with lust by Arnold Drake and Leslie Waller, first American graphic novel (St. John).
- In Greece Themos Andreopoulos establishes the comics magazine Tam-Tam.

== Births ==
=== March ===
- March 6: Al Milgrom, American comic book writer (Archie Comics, Spider-Man, X-Men, co-creator of Firestorm).
- March 14: Dudu Geva, Israeli comics artist, cartoonist and caricaturist (The Duck), (d. 2005).

=== July ===
- July 6: John Byrne, English-born American comic book writer and artist (Fantastic Four, Superman, Doom Patrol, The Amazing Spider-Man).

=== November ===
- November 25: Chris Claremont, American comic book writer (X-Men, Fantastic Four, John Carter, Warlord of Mars).

=== Specific date unknown ===
- Zyx, Canadian cartoonist and comics artist (Sombre Vilain), (d. 2015).
- Elliot S. Maggin, American writer (Action Comics, Detective Comics, Superman).

== Deaths ==
=== May ===
- May 18: Jenö Jeney, Hungarian illustrator, editorial cartoonist and comics artist, dies at age 75.
- Specific date unknown: Mario Silva Ossa, aka Coré, Chilean illustrator and comics artist (Quentin el Aventurero), dies at age 37.

=== June ===
- June 7: W.O. Wilson, South African-American comic artist (The Richleigh Family, The Wish Twins, Madge the Magician's Daughter), dies at age 84.

=== July ===
- July 9: Salvador Bartolozzi, Spanish illustrator, theatrical set designer, comics artist (Pipo y Pipa, Pinocho contra Chapete) and publisher (founder of the children's magazine Pinocho), dies at age 68.
- July 26: Eduard Thöny, Austrian-German cartoonist, dies at age 84.

=== August ===
- August 1: Raoul Thomen, Belgian-French comics artist (Marius, comics based on Charlie Chaplin), dies at age 83.

=== October ===
- October 2: J. Carlos, Brazilian comics artist (Lamparina, Juquinha, Almofadinha & Melindrosa), dies of a brain stroke at age 66.
- October 9: Harry Moyer, A.K.A. Hy Moyer, Canadian comics artist (Nothing But The Truth, Java Bean), dies in a car accident at age 65 or 66.

=== Specific date unknown ===
- Fred Nankivel, American illustrator and comics artist (Sing Sing Sid, Uncle Mun), dies at age 63 or 64.
- Charles W. Saalberg, American illustrator and comics artist (The Ting-Lings), dies at age 84 or 85.

== First issues by title ==
- Foodini (March) Helnit Publishing
- Marvel Boy, cover dated December, by Stan Lee and Russ Heath, published by Timely Comics
- Quatre aventures de Spirou et Fantasio by André Franquin, Dupuis
- Strange Adventures cover dated August–September, published by DC Comics.

== Initial appearances by character name ==
- Akim, in Akim il figlio della giungla #1 (February), created by Roberto Renzi and Augusto Pedrazza, Edizioni Tomasina.
- Deadshot in Batman #59 (June), created by David Vern Reed and Lew Schwartz – DC Comics
- King Faraday in Danger Trail #1 (July), created by Robert Kanigher and Carmine Infantino – DC Comics
- Kinowa, in Kinowa #1 (May), created by Andrea Lavezzolo and EsseGesse, Editoriale Dardo. .
- Knight in Batman #62 (December), created by Bill Finger and Dick Sprang – DC Comics
- Lana Lang in Superboy #10 (September), created by Bill Finger and John Sikela – DC Comics
- Marvel Boy in Marvel Boy #1 (December), created by Stan Lee and Russ Heath – Timely Comics
