= 1937 in comics =

Notable events of 1937 in comics.

== Events and publications ==
=== January ===
- January 8 and June 7: Pablo Picasso makes the comic The Dream and Lie of Franco, a comic strip satirizing Francisco Franco.
- January 9: The first issue of the Italian catholic comic magazine Il vittorioso (The winner) is published.
- January 16: The first issue of the Flemish comics magazine Ons Kinderland is published. It will run for about a year and a half.
- The first issue of the Italian comic magazine Albi d'oro (Golden albums), gathering Mickey Mouse's strips, is published by Mondadori.
- Will Eisner and Jerry Iger (script) and Mort Meskin (art) launch Sheena, Queen of the Jungle in the first issue of Wags, a British comics magazine. A year and nine months later, Sheena will make her debut in the U.S. in Jumbo Comics.
- Detective Picture Stories #2 - Centaur Publications
- Famous Funnies #30 - Eastern Color
- The Funnies #4 - Dell Comics
- Funny Picture Stories (1936 series) #3 - Centaur Publications
- King Comics #10 - David McKay Publications
- More Fun Comics (1936 series) #17 - National Periodical Publications
- New Adventure Comics (previously New Comics) (1936 series) #12 - National Periodical Publications
- Popular Comics #12 - Dell Comics
- Tip Top Comics #9 - United Features

=== February ===
- February 13: Harold Foster's Prince Valiant makes its debut.
- Detective Picture Stories #3 - Centaur Publications
- Famous Funnies #31 - Eastern Color
- The Funnies #5 - Dell Comics
- Funny Pages (1936 series) #8 — Centaur Publications
- Funny Picture Stories (1936 series) #4 - Centaur Publications
- King Comics #11 - David McKay Publications
- More Fun Comics (1936 series) #18 - National Periodical Publications
- New Adventure Comics (1936 series) #13 - National Periodical Publications
- Popular Comics #13 - Dell Comics
- Star Comics (1937 series) #1 - Chesler Publications
- Star Ranger Comics (1937 series) #1 - Chesler Publications
- Tip Top Comics #10 - United Features
- Western Picture Stories #1 - Centaur Publications

=== March ===
- March 1: The first issue of DC Comics comics magazine Detective Comics is published. It features the debut of Jerry Siegel and Joe Shuster's Slam Bradley. Detective Comics will eventually become the longest continuously published comic book magazine in the United States, running without interruption until 2011.
- Marcy 17: The Tiger Tea storyline in George Herriman's Krazy Kat is concluded after 10 months.
- March 22: Jack Monk and Don Freeman's Buck Ryan makes its debut and will run until July 1962.
- The Comics #1 - Dell Comics
- Detective Picture Stories #4 - Centaur Publications
- Famous Funnies #32 - Eastern Color
- The Funnies #6 - Dell Comics
- Funny Pages (1936 series) #9 — Centaur Publications
- Funny Picture Stories (1936 series) #5 - Centaur Publications
- King Comics #12 - David McKay Publications
- More Fun Comics (1936 series) #19 - National Periodical Publications
- New Adventure Comics (1936 series) #14 - National Periodical Publications
- Popular Comics #14 - Dell Comics
- Tip Top Comics #11 - United Features
- Western Picture Stories #2 - Centaur Publications

=== April ===
- April 5: The first episode of Floyd Gottfredson's Mickey Mouse in search of jungle treasure is published.
- Ace Comics (1937 series) #1 - David McKay Publications
- The Comics #2 - Dell Comics
- Detective Comics (1937 series) #2 - DC Comics
- Detective Picture Stories #5 - Centaur Publications
- Famous Funnies #33 - Eastern Color
- The Funnies #7 - Dell Comics
- Funny Pages (1936 series) #10 — Centaur Publications
- Funny Picture Stories (1936 series) #6 - Centaur Publications
- King Comics #13 - David McKay Publications
- Popular Comics #15 - Dell Comics
- Star Comics (1937 series) #2 - Chesler Publications
- Star Ranger Comics (1937 series) #2 - Chesler Publications
- Tip Top Comics #12 - United Features
- Western Picture Stories #3 - Centaur Publications

=== May ===
- May 3: Henning Dahl Mikkelsen, aka Mik's Ferd'nand makes its debut. It will become one of the longest-running pantomime gag-a-day comics in the world, appearing without interruption until 2012.
- May 15: In the 67th issue of the British comics magazine Mickey Mouse Weekly William A. Ward adapts the Disney animated short Don Donald into a comic strip. This marks the first longer adventure comic to star Donald Duck.
- Ace Comics (1937 series) #2 - David McKay Publications
- The Comics #3 - Dell Comics
- Detective Comics (1937 series) #3 - DC Comics
- Famous Funnies #34 - Eastern Color
- Feature Book #1 - David McKay Publications
- The Funnies #8 - Dell Comics
- King Comics #14 - David McKay Publications
- More Fun Comics (1936 series) #20 - National Periodical Publications
- New Adventure Comics (1936 series) #15 - National Periodical Publications
- Popular Comics #16 - Dell Comics
- Star Comics (1937 series) #3 - Chesler Publications
- Star Ranger Comics (1937 series) #3 - Chesler Publications
- Tip Top Comics #13 - United Features

=== June ===
- June 9: The first issue of the Italian comics magazine Il Vittorioso is published. It will run until 1970.
- June 30: The first issue of the Flemish comics magazine Wonderland is published, as a supplement to the newspaper De Dag. It will run until 1942.
- Ace Comics (1937 series) #3 - David McKay Publications
- Detective Comics (1937 series) #4 - DC Comics
- Famous Funnies #35 - Eastern Color
- Feature Book #2 - David McKay Publications
- The Funnies #9 - Dell Comics
- Funny Pages (1936 series) #11 — Centaur Publications
- Funny Picture Stories (1936 series) #7 - Centaur Publications
- King Comics #15 - David McKay Publications
- More Fun Comics (1936 series) #21 - National Periodical Publications
- New Adventure Comics (1936 series) #16 - National Periodical Publications
- Popular Comics #17 - Dell Comics
- Star Comics (1937 series) #4 - Chesler Publications
- Star Ranger Comics (1937 series) #4 - Chesler Publications
- Tip Top Comics #14 - United Features
- Western Picture Stories #4 - Centaur Publications

=== July ===
- July 1: Theo Fünke Kupper's gag comic De Verstrooide Professor makes its debut in the Dutch comics weekly Kleuterblaadje, where it will appear until 1 January 1966.
- July 12: Al Capp and Raeburn Van Buren's Abbie an' Slats makes its debut. It will run until 30 January 1971.
- Ace Comics (1937 series) #4 - David McKay Publications
- The Comics #4 - Dell Comics
- Detective Comics (1937 series) #5 - DC Comics
- Famous Funnies #36 - Eastern Color
- Feature Book #3 - David McKay Publications
- The Funnies #10 - Dell Comics
- King Comics #16 - David McKay Publications
- More Fun Comics (1936 series) #22 - National Periodical Publications
- New Adventure Comics (1936 series) #17 - National Periodical Publications
- Popular Comics #18 - Dell Comics
- Tip Top Comics #15 - United Features

=== August ===
- August 9: The first episode of Floyd Gottfredson's The monarch of Medioka is published, a parody of The prisoner of Zenda.
- The final issue of the French satirical magazine Le Charivari, which offered room for countless comics artists and cartoonists, is published.
- Watt Dell's Olga Mesmer makes its debut. It will run until October 1938.
- Ace Comics (1937 series) #5 - David McKay Publications
- Detective Comics (1937 series) #6 - DC Comics
- Famous Funnies #37 - Eastern Color
- Feature Book #4 - David McKay Publications
- The Funnies #11 - Dell Comics
- King Comics #17 - David McKay Publications
- More Fun Comics (1936 series) #23 - National Periodical Publications
- New Adventure Comics (1936 series) #18 - National Periodical Publications
- Popular Comics #19 - Dell Comics
- Star Comics (1937 series) #5 - Chesler Publications
- Star Ranger Comics (1937 series) #5 - Chesler Publications
- Tip Top Comics #16 - United Features

=== September ===
- September: Ultem Publishing starts publishing Funny Pages and Funny Picture Stories after purchasing them from Centaur Publications.
- Ace Comics (1937 series) #6 - David McKay Publications
- The Comics #5 - Dell Comics
- Detective Comics (1937 series) #7 - DC Comics
- Famous Funnies #38 - Eastern Color
- Feature Book #5 - David McKay Publications
- The Funnies #12 - Dell Comics
- Funny Pages (1937 series) #1 (12) — Ultem Publishing
- Funny Picture Stories (1937 series) #1 - Ultem Publishing
- King Comics #18 - David McKay Publications
- More Fun Comics (1936 series) #24 - National Periodical Publications
- New Adventure Comics (1936 series) #19 - National Periodical Publications
- Popular Comics #20 - Dell Comics
- Star Comics (1937 series) #6 - Chesler Publications
- Star Ranger Comics (1937 series) #6 - Chesler Publications
- Tip Top Comics #17 - United Features

=== October ===
- October 17: In Al Taliaferro's Donald Duck newspaper comic strip Huey, Louie and Dewey make their debut.
- October: Ultem Publishing buys Chesler Publishing, keeping on Harry Chesler as an editor.
- Ace Comics (1937 series) #7 - David McKay Publications
- Detective Comics (1937 series) #8 - DC Comics
- Famous Funnies #39 - Eastern Color
- Feature Book #6 - David McKay Publications
- Feature Funnies (1937 series) #1 - Comic Favorites, Inc.
- The Funnies #13 - Dell Comics
- Funny Pages (1937 series) #2 (13) — Ultem Publishing
- Funny Picture Stories (1937 series) #2 - Ultem Publishing
- King Comics #19 - David McKay Publications
- More Fun Comics (1936 series) #25 - National Periodical Publications
- New Adventure Comics (1936 series) #20 - National Periodical Publications
- Popular Comics #21 - Dell Comics
- Tip Top Comics #18 - United Features

=== November ===
- November 17: The final episode of A.M. de Jong and George van Raemdonck's long-running newspaper comic Bulletje en Boonestaak is published.
- November 28: The final episode of Bud Counihan's Betty Boop newspaper comic is published.
- Ace Comics (1937 series) #8 - David McKay Publications
- Detective Comics (1937 series) #9 - DC Comics
- Famous Funnies #40 - Eastern Color
- Feature Book #7 - David McKay Publications
- Feature Funnies (1937 series) #2 - Comic Favorites, Inc.
- The Funnies #14 - Dell Comics
- Funny Pages (1937 series) #3 (14) - Ultem Publishing
- Funny Picture Stories (1937 series) #3 - Ultem Publishing
- King Comics #20 - David McKay Publications
- More Fun Comics (1936 series) #26 - National Periodical Publications
- New Adventure Comics (1936 series) #21 - National Periodical Publications
- Popular Comics #22 - Dell Comics
- Star Comics (1937 series) #7 - Ultem Publishing
- Star Ranger Comics (1937 series) #7 - Ultem Publishing
- Tip Top Comics #19 - United Features

=== December ===
- December 4: First issue of the long-running British comics magazine The Dandy #1 - DC Thomson. It will run until December 4, 2012. It its first issue Dudley D. Watkins's Desperate Dan, Allan Morley's Freddie the Fearless Fly, John R. Mason's Barney Boko and Keyhole Kate and James Crighton's Korky the Cat make their debut.
- December 28: Hugh McClelland's Beelzebub Jones makes its debut. It will run until 28 December 1945.
- December 30: The first issue of the Italian Disney comics magazine Donald Duck and Other Adventures (Paperino e altre avventure) is published. It stars a Donald Duck story by Federico Pedrocchi (Paperino e il mistero di Marte, Donald Duck and the Mars Mystery) and is actually the first time that Donald is featured as the star of a continuous adventure comics series, long before this happens in the United States.
- Ace Comics (1937 series) #9 - David McKay Publications
- Detective Comics (1937 series) #10 - DC Comics
- Famous Funnies #41 - Eastern Color
- Feature Book #8 - David McKay Publications
- Feature Funnies (1937 series) #3 - Comic Favorites, Inc.
- The Funnies #15 - Dell Comics
- Funny Pages (1937 series) #4 (15) — Ultem Publishing
- Funny Picture Stories (1937 series) #4 - Ultem Publishing
- King Comics #20 - David McKay Publications
- More Fun Comics (1936 series) #27 - National Periodical Publications
- New Adventure Comics (1936 series) #22 - National Periodical Publications
- Popular Comics #23 - Dell Comics
- Star Comics (1937 series) #8 - Ultem Publishing
- Star Ranger Comics (1937 series) #8 - Ultem Publishing
- Tip Top Comics #20 - United Features

=== Specific date unknown ===
- In Hanover, Germany the Wilhelm Busch Museum opens its doors.
- Hector Torino's Don Nicola makes his debut.

=== Specials ===
- New Book of Comics (1937 series) #1 - National Periodical Publications

== Births ==
=== February ===
- February 9: Hiroshi Hirata, Japanese comic artist, (d. 2021).

== Deaths ==
=== January ===
- January 10: Gabriele Galantara, Italian journalist, caricaturist and comics artist, dies at age 73.

=== March ===
- March 8: Carlos Ángel Díaz Huertas, Spanish painter, illustrator and comics artist, dies at age 70 or 71.
- March 17: Harold Earnshaw, British comics artist and illustrator (The Pater), dies at age 51.
- March 20: Ramón Cilla, Spanish caricaturist and comics artist, dies at age 76.

=== May ===
- May 26: Lansing Campbell, American writer, illustrator and comic artist (Uncle Wiggily's Adventures), dies at age 55.
- May 27: Garnet Warren, American comic artist (Mr. and Mrs. Garden Green, The Holmes Home and Jack and Jill), dies at age 53 or 54.

=== July ===
- July 6: M.T. Penny Ross, American comics artist and illustrator (Mamma's Angel Child, assisted on Buster Brown), dies at age 56.

=== August ===
- August 28: Frederick Burr Opper, American comics artist (Happy Hooligan, Alphonse and Gaston, And Her Name Was Maud), dies at age 80.

=== October ===
- October 16: Jean de Brunhoff, French novelist, illustrator and comics artist (Babar the Elephant), dies at age 37 of tuberculosis.

=== November ===
- November 10: Sergej Mironović Golovčenko, Croatian illustrator and comics artist (Maks i Maksic), dies at age 38 or 39.

=== December ===
- December 5: Gustave Verbeek, American comics artist (The Upside Downs of Little Lady Lovekins and Old Man Muffaroo), dies at age 70.
- December 11: Herbert Crowley, British painter and comics artist (The Wigglemuch), dies at age 54 or 54.

=== Specific date unknown ===
- Peter Bacon (pseudonym for Katherine Bacon), British illustrator (The Toy Theatre Folk), dies at an unknown age.
- G. L'Huer, French illustrator (made text comics for Le Quantin), dies at age 63 or 64.
- Joan Llopart, Spanish illustrator and comics artist, dies at age 80.
- Jean Rapsomanikis, Greek-Spanish comics artist (Ojo De Lince), dies at age 52.
- William Ridgewell, British cartoonist, illustrator and comics artist, dies at age 55 or 56.

== First issues by title ==
- Ace Comics (April, David McKay Publications)
- Detective Comics (March, DC Comics)
- Feature Funnies (October, Harry A. Chesler Comics)
- Star Comics (April, Chesler Publications)
- Star Ranger Comics (February, Chesler Publications)
- The Dandy (December, DC Thomson)

=== Renamed titles ===
- New Comics renamed New Adventure Comics as of the January cover date.

== Initial appearances by character name ==
- Slam Bradley in Detective Comics #1 - March. Published by DC Comics
- Speed Saunders in Detective Comics #1 - March. Published by DC Comics
