= Two Gun Kid (comic book) =

American comic book series

Publication information
- Publisher: Timely Comics; Atlas Comics; Marvel Comics
- Schedule: Bimonthly
- Format: Ongoing series
- Genre: Western
- Publication date: (Timely); Mar. 1948 – Nov. 1949 (Marvel); Nov. 1953 – Apr. 1977
- No. of issues: 136
- Main character(s): Clay Harder; Matt Hawk

Creative team
- Written by: Stan Lee
- Artist(s): Ogden Whitney
- Penciller(s): Jack Kirby, Dick Ayers
- Inker(s): Dick Ayers, Joe Sinnott

Two Gun Kid is the name of a comic book title featuring the character Two Gun Kid originally published by Timely Comics beginning in 1948, by Atlas Comics from 1953 to 1961, and later by Marvel Comics.

== Publication history ==
The series titled Two-Gun Kid ran in two parts, from 1948 to 1949 and then from 1953 to 1977. Clay Harder debuted in Two-Gun Kid #1 (March 1948). He was Marvel's second continuing Western character, following the Masked Raider, who had appeared in Marvel Comics #1 / Marvel Mystery Comics #2–12 (October 1939 – Octctoer 1940). Two-Gun Kid was the company's first ongoing Western title, running 10 issues.

Russ Heath said in 2004 he believed his first work for Timely was a Western story featuring the Two-Gun Kid. Historians have tentatively identified his first work as either a Kid Colt story in the omnibus series Wild Western #4 (Nov. 1948); the second Two-Gun Kid story in Two-Gun Kid #5 (Dec. 1948), "Guns Blast in Thunder Pass;" and the Two-Gun Kid story in Wild Western #5 (Dec. 1948), while confirming Heath art on the Kid Colt story that same issue.

Beginning in 1953, Atlas Comics continued the original Two-Gun Kid series from issue #11, and then continued with Marvel publishing it until cover date April 1977. The Harder version of the character appeared sporadically through 1962, with Joe Sinnott being the last artist to draw the original Two-Gun Kid on a regular basis.

Two-Gun Kid #60 (Nov. 1962) retconned the Clay Harder character out of existence, turning him into a dime novel character who had inspired the second Two-Gun Kid, Matt Hawk. Stan Lee and Jack Kirby, creators of the Fantastic Four, concocted the new Kid to make the character resemble a masked superhero with a secret identity, to stimulate sales for the title. Kirby drew the title for three more issues before passing it off to Dick Ayers.

From issue #93 (July 1970) on, Two-Gun Kid was mostly a reprint title. At one point later in the second series, some of the original Clay Harder Kid adventures were retouched to add a mask and make him look like the Matt Hawk Kid for the reprints. Two-Gun Kid story reprints, including many Jack Kirby-drawn stories, also appeared in the 1968–1976 title The Mighty Marvel Western.

Ogden Whitney became the regular artist for the series from No. 87 to the final issue, No. 92 (May 1967 – March 1968). He wrote and drew the lead story in the mostly reprint revival of the title, in No. 103 (March 1972), and penciled a nine-page backup story, "Invitation to a Gunfight", by writer Marv Wolfman, in the following issue (May 1972), marking his last known comics work.
