= Helpful Henry =

One of two comic strips

Helpful Henry was the name of two comic strips—one from the United States, the other from the United Kingdom.

== American comic strip Helpful Henry (1922–1927) ==
Helpful Henry was an American gag-a-day comic strip, created by cartoonist J. P. Arnot (Paul Arnot – Born: 16 September 1887 – Died: 2 December 1951). The series ran from July 17, 1922, until 1927 and was syndicated by International Feature Service. Despite its brief run actor Oliver Hardy, of Laurel and Hardy fame, said the character was an inspiration for his own screen character. He described Helpful Henry as being big, fussy and self-important, but underneath it all, he was a very nice fellow.

== British comic strip Helpful Henry (1938–1939) ==
Helpful Henry was also a British gag-a-day comic strip from the magazine The Beano. It first appeared in Beano issue 1, dated 30 July 1938, drawn by Eric Roberts. A similarly named character had also appeared in the first issue of The Wizard under the name 'Elpful 'Enery.

The central character is Henry, a young boy who attempts to be helpful but ends up doing more harm than good – usually as a result of a misunderstanding or misinterpretation.

He was also in The Dandy Annual 1939, which came out two months after Beano No. 1 – it is unknown whether the character moved comic or if this was a preview. However some characters, such as Marmaduke Mean the Miser, only appeared in the annuals, so that could be the explanation. As well as this some early Dandy characters such as Podge appeared in the 1940 Beano annual so this could be the case of minor characters just appearing in any DC Thomson annual.

Helpful Henry reappeared in Sparky in issue 211 (dated 1 February 1969) drawn by Hugh Morren this strip lasted in Sparky until issue 230.
