= Pantera Bionda =

Italian comic book character

A cover of Pantera Bionda.

Pantera Bionda was an Italian comics series, launched on 24 April 1948. It featured Pantera Bionda ("Blonde Panther"), a jungle girl inspired by American characters such as Sheena and Nyoka, and was created by writer Gian Giacomo Dalmasso and artist Ingam (Enzo Magni). The series was published by Giurma, first with biweekly and then weekly periodicity.

The panels were usually realized by a team: Mario Cubbino for example was often responsible for the semi-nude body of the main character, while other drew the face, backgrounds, and other necessary features. The stories of Pantera Bionda, a blonde western girl raised by a Chinese woman, are set in the forests of Borneo and Sunda Islands just after the end of World War II; she fights criminals and the last Japanese Army survivors who had not surrendered to the Allies.

The image of Pantera Bionda as an aggressive and independent woman, and her attire composed of bikinis and perizomas, caused increasing pressure for censure from the conservative Italian scene. This led to the addition of sorts of shorts to Pantera Bionda before the panels went to print. The success of the series, which at its apex sold up to 100,000 copies per week, started to decrease proportionally to the increasingly longer dresses of the character.

The series ended with #108 in June 1950. Her stories were reprinted several times in the following decades in Italy.
