= Adventures into the Unknown =

Comic book series

Adventures Into the Unknown
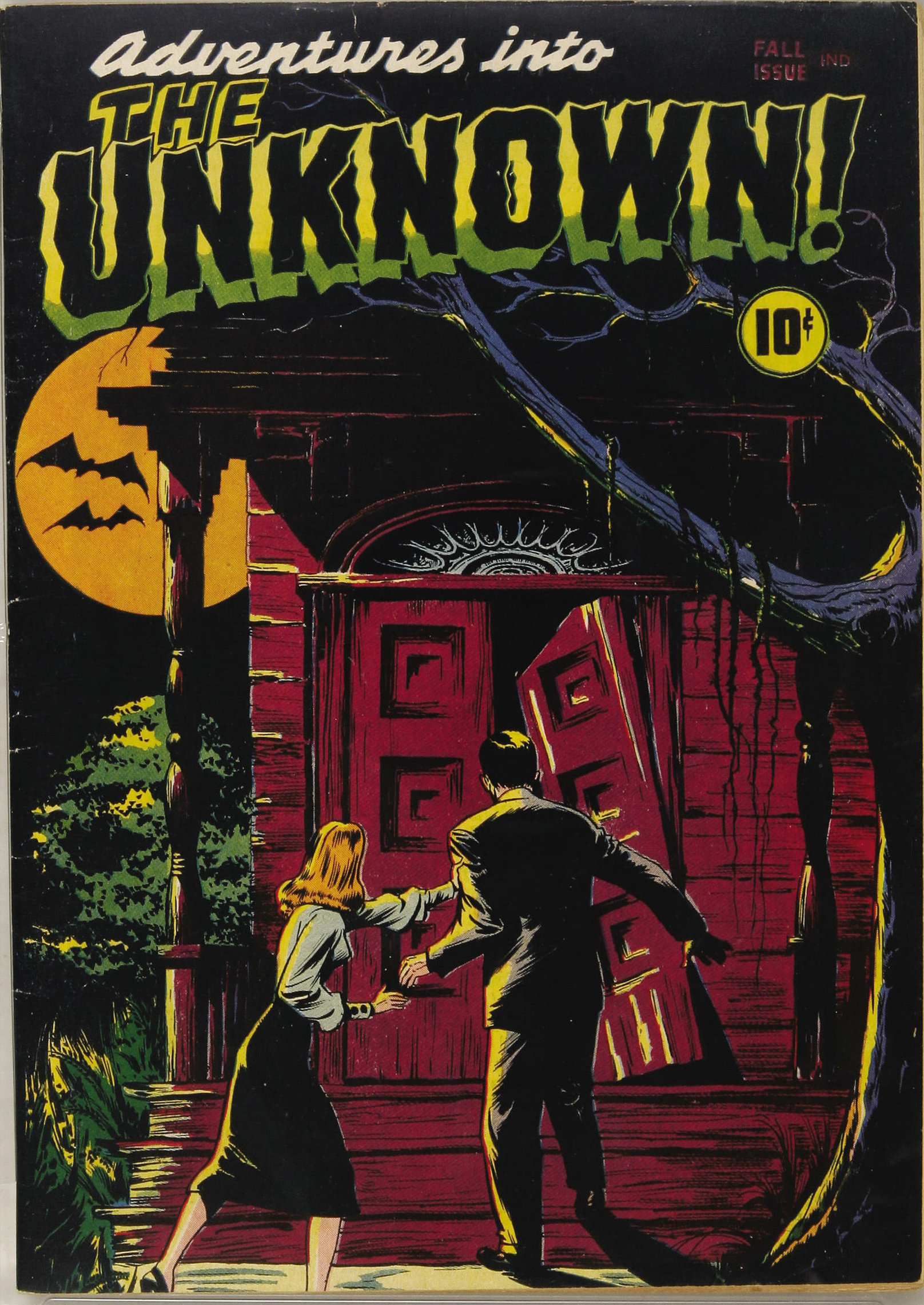
- Adventures into the Unknown #1 (Fall 1948). Cover art by Edvard Moritz

Publication information
- Publisher: American Comics Group
- Publication date: Fall 1948 – August 1967
- No. of issues: 174

Adventures Into the Unknown was an American comic-book magazine series best known as the medium's first ongoing horror-comics title. Published by the American Comics Group, initially under the imprint B&I Publishing, it ran 174 issues (cover-dated Fall 1948 – Aug. 1967).

The first issue, written by Frank Belknap Long with art by Fred Guardineer and others, featured the stories "The Werewolf Stalks", "The Living Ghost", "It Walked By Night" and "Haunted House". It also included a seven-page abridged adaptation of Horace Walpole's seminal gothic novel The Castle of Otranto, by an unknown writer and artist, Al Ulmer.

== Collected editions ==
- ACG Collected Works: Adventures into the Unknown, collects issues 1–83 (PS Artbooks)
  - Volume 1 (2011) (ISBN 978-1-848632-17-2) through Volume 21 (2020) (ISBN 978-1-78636-652-8)
- Dark Horse Archives: Adventures into the Unknown!, collects issues 1–16 (Dark Horse)
  - Volume 1 (2012) (ISBN 1-59582-930-X) through Volume 4 (2015) (ISBN 1-61655-623-4)

== See also ==
- Horror comics
