= Just Jake =

Bernard Graddon's Just Jake (1950)

Just Jake was a comic strip that ran for 14 years in the British newspaper The Daily Mirror. Drawn by Bernard Graddon, it was published daily beginning 4 June 1938 and concluding early in 1952 after Graddon's death.

== Characters and story ==
A satire of dramatic films and other comic strips, Just Jake depicted events at the village of Much Cackling in the county of Gertshire. The prime character, Captain A.R.P. Reilly-Ffoull, squire of Arntwee Hall, was a parody of early movie villains. He was aided by his servant/butler Eric and the local serf, Titus Tallow. Jake, the original hero of the title, seldom appeared after the first year. Other characters were schoolgirl Missy, old crone Maida Grannit and Cactus, a black man.

== Influence ==
The speech balloons contained colourful language with such exclamations as "Holy Polecats!", "Well, knock me down!", and the strip's catch phrase, "Stap Me!". The latter became the nickname of Squadron Leader Basil Gerald "Stapme" Stapleton, a Battle of Britain fighter pilot, because it was his favourite comic strip.
