= 1948 in comics =

Notable events of 1948 in comics.

== Events and publications ==
=== Year Overall ===
- Tony Falco by Andrea Lavezzolo

==== January ====
- January 5: Stanley Link's newspaper comic The Dailys is first published. It will run until 14 September 1957.
- January 24: Debut of Dudley D. Watkins' Biffo the Bear in The Beano.
- January 26: Frank Godwin's Rusty Riley makes its debut.
- January: In the Donald Duck story Wintertime Wager Donald's cousin Gladstone Gander makes his debut.
- Captain America Comics (1941 series) #65 - Timely Comics
- Frankie and Lana (previously Frankie Comics) issue #13 - Timely Comics
- Sub-Mariner Comics (1941 series) #24 - Timely Comics
- The first issue of the Dutch comics magazine Ketelbinkie Krant is published, which is named Kapitein Rob's Vrienden outside Rotterdam. It will run until February 1957.

==== February ====
- All-True Crime Cases (previously Official True Crime Cases) issue #26 (Timely Comics)
- Marvel Mystery Comics (1939 series) #85 - Timely Comics

==== March ====
- March 28: in L'Humanité, PCF's house organ, the strip Pif le chien, by José Cabrero Arnal, make its debut.
- Collier's Weekly publishes Fredric Wertham's "Horror in the Nursery"
- Two-Gun Kid (1948 series) #1 - Timely Comics

=== Spring ===
- Joker Comics (1942 series) #31 - Timely Comics

==== April ====
- April 29: Jacques Laudy's Hassan et Kaddour debuts in Tintin, where it will run until 1962.
- April 30: The first episode the Mickey Mouse story The Atombrella and the Rhyming Man, by Bill Walsh and Floyd Gottfredson is published, which marks the debut of the Rhyming Man.
- Captain America Comics (1941 series) #66 - Timely Comics
- Crime Fighters (1948 series) #1 - Timely Comics
- Sub-Mariner Comics (1941 series) #25 - Timely Comics

==== May ====
- Blackstone the Magician issue 2 - Timely Comics
- Comedy Comics vol. 2, issue 1 - Timely Comics
- Human Torch Comics (1940 series) #30 - Timely Comics

==== June ====
- June 9: U.S. bandleader Fred Waring starts an annual event where professional cartoonists are invited to come to his golf resort in Shwanee Inn. This will result in a huge collection of cartoons and comics: the Fred Waring collection.
- Crime Exposed (1948 series) #1 - Timely Comics
- Crime Fighters (1948 series) #2 - Timely Comics
- Marvel Mystery Comics (1939 series) #86 - Timely Comics
- Sub-Mariner Comics (1941 series) #26 - Timely Comics
- Two-Gun Kid (1948 series) #2 - Timely Comics

==== July ====
- July 1: Lev Gleason Publications, EC Comics, Famous Funnies, and Orbit Publications found the Association of Comics Magazine Publishers, to regulate the content of comic books in the face of the publication of Fredric Wertham's "Horror in the Nursery" and "The Psychopathology of Comic Books", and increasing public criticism of the comic book industry.
- July 18: The final episode of Bunky is published.
- July: The American Journal of Psychotherapy publishes Fredric Wertham's "The Psychopathology of Comic Books", which will lead to a witch hunt against comics.
- Blackstone the Magician #3 - Timely Comics
- Captain America Comics (1941 series) #67 - Timely Comics
- Human Torch Comics (1940 series) #31 - Timely Comics
- Joker Comics (1942 series) #32 - Timely Comics

==== August ====
- August 16: The first episode of André LeBlanc's Morena Flor is published. The series will run until 1951.
- August 20: In Al Capp's Li'l Abner the Shmoo makes its debut, which will become an unexpected merchandising phenomenon within a few months.
- All-Winners Comics vol. 2, issue 1 - Timely Comics
- Complete Mystery issue 1 - Timely Comics
- Crime Fighters (1948 series) #3 - Timely Comics
- Kid Colt, Hero Of The West issue 1 - Timely Comics
- Krazy Komics vol. 2, issue 1 - Timely Comics
- Lana (1948 series) #1 - Timely Comics
- Marvel Mystery Comics (1939 series) #87 - Timely Comics
- Sub-Mariner Comics (1941 series) #27 - Timely Comics
- Two-Gun Kid (1948 series) #3 - Timely Comics
- Venus (1948 series) #1 - Timely Comics
- Wow Comics, with issue #69, publishes its final issue, changing format and title to Real Western Hero, and continuing the numbering — Fawcett Comics

==== September ====
- September: First publication of the Swedish Disney comics magazine Kalle Anka & C:o.
- September 16: Willy Vandersteen's Suske en Wiske makes its debut in Tintin, but in a graphic style which is more advanced than the version which runs in Flemish newspapers.
- September 16: Jacques Martin's The Adventures of Alix makes its debut in Tintin
- September 16: in the Belgian edition of Tintin, first chapter of the second version, completed and revised, of Land of black gold by Hergé.
- September 30: Il totem misterioso by Gian Luigi Bonelli and Galep (Audace), first adventure of Tex Willer.
- Blaze Carson issue 1 - Timely Comics
- Captain America Comics (1941 series) #68 - Timely Comics
- Human Torch Comics (1940 series) #32 - Timely Comics
- Joker Comics (1942 series) #33 - Timely Comics

==== October ====
- October 4: Walt Kelly's Pogo, a comic book feature since 1942, makes its debut as a newspaper strip.
- October 25: The Dutch Ministry of Culture Theo Rutten puts an official government declaration in the newspaper Het Parool to ask teachers to stop distributing dangerous and mind-corrupting comics.
- Crime Fighters (1948 series) #4 - Timely Comics
- Lana (1948 series) #2 - Timely Comics
- Marvel Mystery Comics (1939 series) #88 - Timely Comics
- Sub-Mariner Comics (1941 series) #28 - Timely Comics
- Two-Gun Kid (1948 series) #4 - Timely Comics
- Venus (1948 series) #2 - Timely Comics

==== November ====
- November 7: The first episode of Kreigh Collins' Mitzi McCoy appears in print. The series will run for two years, whereupon it changes title to Kevin the Bold.
- November 15: James Simpkins' Jasper the Bear makes its debut and will run until 1972.
- November 18: El diablo, by Gian Luigi Bonelli and Galep; Tex Willer, in his debut stories described as an outlaw, enters in the Texas Rangers and meets for the first time his partner Kit Carson.
- Captain America Comics (1941 series) #69 - Timely Comics
- Crime Fighters (1948 series) #5 - Timely Comics
- Human Torch Comics (1940 series) #33 - Timely Comics
- Joker Comics (1942 series) #34 - Timely Comics

==== December ====
- Lana (1948 series) #3 - Timely Comics
- Marvel Mystery Comics (1939 series) #89 - Timely Comics
- Sub-Mariner Comics (1941 series) #29 - Timely Comics
- Two-Gun Kid (1948 series) #5 - Timely Comics
- Venus (1948 series) #3 - Timely Comics

== Births ==
=== March ===
- March 16: Picanyol, Spanish comics artist (Ot el bruixot, L'Illa Perduda), (d. 2021).

=== May ===
- May 17: Carlos Romeu Müller, Spanish comics artist (Miguelito), (d. 2021).

=== Specific date unknown ===
- Cary Bates, American comic book writer (Superman, Legion of Super-Heroes, Captain Atom, The Flash).

== Deaths ==
=== January ===
- January 26: Thomas Theodor Heine, German painter, cartoonist, comics artist and illustrator (worked for the magazine Simplicissimus), dies at age 90.

=== March ===
- March 15: Mary Tourtel, British illustrator and comics artist (Rupert Bear), dies at age 74.
- March 18: Freddie Langeler, Dutch comics artist (Pietje Pluk en Kootje Kwak, Bobby den Speurder, Barendje Kwik, Bello Blafmeier), dies at age 49.
- March 24: Wally Wallgren, American comics artist (Inbad the Sailor, Tired Timothy, Helpful Hints, Hoosegow Herman), dies at age 65.

=== April ===
- April 24: Wallace Morgan, American illustrator and comics artist (a comic strip adaptation of the novel Cluny Brown), dies at age 72 or 73.

=== May ===
- May 19: Herbert Morton Stoops, American illustrator and comics artist (continued Have You Seen Alonso?), dies at age 60.
- May 31: Vincent Krassousky, A.K.A. Vica, Russian-French comics writer and artist (Vica), dies at age 45.

=== June ===
- June 13: Jimmy Frise, Canadian comics artist (Life's Little Comedies, later Birdseye Centre), dies at age 57.

=== July ===
- July 25: George Ernest Studdy, British comics artist (Bonzo the dog), dies at age 70.

=== August ===
- Specific date unknown: Feliu Elias, aka Apa, Spanish caricaturist, painter, art critic and comics artist (Las Hazañas del Pitafras), dies at age 59.

=== September ===
- September 18: Ernest Hix, American comic writer (continued Strange as It Seems), dies at age 46.

=== October ===
- October 5: Bert Green, British animator and comics artist (Stella and Gertie, Kids), dies at age 63.
- October 11: Ippei Okamoto, Japanese manga artist (Kuma o Tazumete, Tanpô Gashu, Kanraku, Match no Bou, Monomiyusan), dies at age 62.

=== November ===
- November 4: Carl Thomas Anderson, American comics artist (Henry), dies at age 83.

=== December ===
- December 5: Fukujiro Yokoi, Japanese comics artist (Putchar in Wonderland), dies at age 36 from TB.

=== Specific date unknown ===
- Jack Farr, American comics artist (Little Willie, Mr. Jolt, Chubby, If They Came Back And Did It Over Again Today, Bringing Up Bill, Bradley, Vitamin Vic, Donny the Dreamer, Gadget Man, Iron Munro, Romeo the Robot, Three-Ring Binks), dies at age 48 or 49.
- Christian Haugen, Norwegian novelist and comics writer, whose stories were adapted into comics by Arent Christensen, dies at age 53 or 54.
- Joan García Junceda, Spanish illustrator and comics artist (Les Extraordinàries Aventures d'en Massagran), dies at age 66 or 67.

== First issues by title ==
=== DC Comics ===
- Leave It to Binky (February/March)
- Mr. District Attorney (January/February)
- Western Comics (January/February)

=== Dell Comics ===
- The Lone Ranger (January/February)
- Tarzan (January/February)

=== Marvel Comics (Timely, Atlas) ===
- All-Winners Comics (vol. 2) cover-dated August (Timely)
- Annie Oakley cover-dated Spring
- Blaze Carson cover-dated September
- Comedy Comics cover-dated May
- Complete Mystery cover-dated August
- Crime Exposed cover-dated June
- Crimefighters cover-dated April
- Kid Colt, Hero Of The West cover-dated August
- Krazy Komics cover-dated August
- Lana
- Lawbreakers Always Lose!
- Mitzi Comics
- My Romance
- Namora cover-dated August
- Sun Girl cover-dated August (Timely)
- Tex Morgan
- Tex Taylor cover-dated September (Atlas)
- Two-Gun Kid March (Atlas)
- Venus cover-dated August
- Wacky Duck
- Wild West cover-dated Spring (Atlas)
- Witness

=== Other publishers ===
- Adventures into the Unknown (B&I Publishing, Fall)
- The Adventures of Alix
- The Adventures of Dick Cole (Novelty Press)
- Funnyman (Magazine Enterprise)
- Kalle Anka & C:o (Egmont)
- Pantera Bionda (Giurma, April 24)
- Spirou et Fantasio (Dupuis)
- Spirou et l'aventure (Dupuis)
- Sweethearts (Fawcett, October)
- Tex Willer (Sergio Bonelli Editore, 30 September)
- Zago, Jungle Prince (Fox Feature Syndicate, September)

=== Comic strips ===
- Pogo (Post-Hall Syndicate, October 4)
- Rusty Riley (King Features, January 26)
- Pif le chien (L'Humanité on March 28, 1948)

== Renamed titles ==
- All True Crime Cases issue #26 renamed from Official True Crime Cases as of the February cover date. (Marvel Comics)
- All-Western Winners issue #2 renamed from All Winners Comics (vol. 2) as of the Winter cover date. (Timely Comics)
- Blackstone the Magician #2 (cover-dated May) renamed from Blackstone the Magician Detective Fights Crime (EC Comics)
- Frankie and Lana issue #13 renamed from Frankie Comics as of the January cover date. (Marvel Comics)
- Mitzi's Boyfriend issue #2 renamed from Mitzi Comics (Marvel Comics)
- Wild Western issue #3 renamed from Wild West as of the September cover date (Atlas Comics)

== Initial appearances by character name ==
- Cowboy Marshall in Western Comics #1 (January), created by Don Cameron - DC Comics
- Evil Star in All Star Comics #44 (December), created by John Broome and Irwin Hasen - DC Comics
- Fiddler (comics) in All-Flash #32 (January), created by Robert Kanigher and Lee Elias - DC Comics
- Jor-El in Superman #53 (August), created by Jerry Siegel and Joe Shuster - DC Comics
- Larry Lance in Flash Comics #92 (February), created by Robert Kanigher and Carmine Infantino - DC Comics
- Mad Hatter, in Batman #49 (October), created by Bill Finger and Lew Sayre Schwartz - DC Comics
- Merry Pemberton in Star-Spangled Comics #81 (June), created by Otto Binder and Win Mortimer - DC Comics
- Nighthawk (DC Comics) in Western Comics #5 (September), created by Robert Kanigher and Charles Paris - DC Comics
- Riddler in Detective Comics #140 (October), created by Bill Finger and Dick Sprang - DC Comics
- Rodeo Rick in Western Comics #5 (September), created by Robert Kanigher and Charles Paris - DC Comics
- Serafino by Egidio Gherlizza in Gaie Fantasie (Edizioni Alpe)
- Star Sapphire (comics) in All-Flash Comics #32 (December), created by Robert Kanigher and Lee Elias - DC Comics
- Vicki Vale in Batman #49 (October), created by Bob Kane and Bill Finger - DC Comics
- Wyoming Kid in Western Comics #1 (January), created by Don Cameron - DC Comics
