= 1965 in comics =

Notable events of 1965 in comics.

== Events ==
=== January ===
- January 19: In Quino's Mafalda, Felipe makes his debut.
- January 21: in Pilote, La piste des Navajos (Navajos' trail) by Jean-Michel Charlier and Jean Giraud; Blueberry gets the surname "Nez Cassé" (Broken nose).
- January 23: The first issue of the British comics magazine Sparky is published. It will run until 1977.
- January: Robert Crumb's Fritz the Cat makes his first public appearance in Help!.
- January: Michael O'Donoghue and Frank Springer's The Adventures of Phoebe Zeit-Geist is first published.

=== February ===
- February 13: The final episode of Jay Heavilin and Frank B. Johnson's Einstein is published.
- February 15: Morrie Turner's Wee Pals makes its debut.
- February 21 – March 2: The first edition of the Salone Internazionale dei Comics is held in Bordighera, Italy. The next edition will take place in Lucca and thus grow out to become the Lucca Comics festival.
- The first issue of Enemy Ace is published.
- In Del Connell and Paul Murry's Phantom Blot story The Phantom Blot meets Super Goof, Goofy's super-eroic alter ego Super Goof is introduced. In October a magazine is dedicated to him.

=== March ===
- March 14:
  - Raymond Macherot's Sibylline makes its debut in Spirou.
  - In Charles M. Schulz' Peanuts the Kite-Eating Tree receives its name.
- March 28: The final episode of Mike Roy's Akwas is published.
- March 29: In Quino's Mafalda Manolito makes his debut.
- March 31: Belgian comics artist Marc Sleen finishes his final adventure of The Adventures of Nero in the newspaper Het Volk, after which he joins another newspaper, De Standaard. At this occasion he also terminates all his other series: Piet Fluwijn en Bolleke, Doris Dobbel, Oktaaf Keunink, De Ronde van Frankrijk and De Lustige Kapoentjes, keeping only Nero
- The first episode of Nino Cannata's Sadik is published.

=== April ===
- April 1: As an April fool's joke, the covers of the rival comic magazines Tintin and Spirou are redesigned to make the Tintin cover look like Spirou and vice versa, complete with restyled logos and lay-out. The joke was thought up by Spirou editor Yvan Delporte in collaboration with Tintin's editors.
- April 4: The Masked Cucumber (Concombre Masqué) makes his debut in Nikita Mandryka's comic Boff in Vaillant. A week later the strange character receives his own long-running spin-off series.
- April 8: The first story of Jidéhem's Sophie is prepublished in Spirou.
- April 12: Since Marc Sleen is contractually unable to publish a new The Adventures of Nero story for three months Willy Vandersteen and Eduard De Rop create a cut-and-paste comic strip named De Geschiedenis van Sleenovia, which features Nero characters but drawn by Studio Vandersteen. It runs in De Standaard for three months, but after only three episodes the comic strip is modified for copyright issues, as Het Volk sues De Standaard for making an unauthorized copy of their former hit comic strip. After a few weeks the legal battle is solved and the story is allowed to continue as planned. It runs until 30 June, after which Sleen finally makes the first Nero story for De Standaard.
- April 19: Il Tesoro del pirata, by Gian Luigi Bonelli and Guglielmo Letteri; Tex Willer meets the New Orleans sheriff Nat Mac Kennet, who will become a recurring character in his adventures.
- April 29: in Spirou, Des barbelés sur la prairie by Goscinny and Morris
- April 29: in Pilote, Le cavalier perdu, by Jean-Michel Charlier and Jean Giraud; debut of the silver digger Jim McClure, Blueberry's recurring sidekick.
- The first issue of the Italian comics magazine Linus is published.

=== May ===
- May 2: The final episode of Right Around Home is published.
- May 3: The first episode of Bud Blake's Tiger is published, which will run until 2003.
- May 10: The comic strip The Born Loser, by Art Sansom, begins syndication.
- May 27: The first episode of René Goscinny and Marcel Gotlib's Les Dingodossiers appears in Pilote, where it will run for the next four years.
- In the Italian magazine Linus the series Neutron by Guido Crepax is first published. It will eventually be retitled Valentina.

=== June ===
- June 6: In Quino's Mafalda her female friend Susanita makes her debut.
- June 8: Suske en Wiske receive a statue in Zuiddorpe, The Netherlands.
- June 14: The final episode of Jack Kent's King Aroo is published.
- June 26: The first episode of Ted Cowan and Reg Bunn's The Spider is published. It will run until 1969.

=== July ===
- July 12: In Charles M. Schulz' Peanuts Snoopy first tries to write a novel, which becomes a running gag.
- July 13: Bob De Moor's experimental gag comic Balthazar debuts in Tintin.
- July 22: Alfred Bestall concludes his final Rupert Bear story. The comic is continued by Alex Cubie and Jenny Kisler.
- July 20: in Le journal de Tintin, Piège pour Ric Hochet, by André-Paul Duchâteau and Tibet.
- July 24–25: The first Detroit Triple Fan Fair is held in Detroit, Michigan by Shel Dorf, Jerry Bails, Carl Lundgren, Tom Altschuler, Ed April, Noel Cooper, Gary Crowdus, Howard Devore, Marvin Giles, Dennis Kowicki, Larry Larson, Eugene Seeger and Robert Brosch. Although a convention for various multigenre it features comic books as a major component too, making it the oldest regularly held comic book convention in the world. It will run until 1977.

=== August ===
- August 22: In Charles M. Schulz' Peanuts Snoopy first imagines being a member of the French Foreign Legion, which becomes a running gag.
- August 24: in Le journal de Tintin, The necklace affair by Edgar P. Jacobs.

=== September ===
- September 5: The comic strip Eek and Meek, by Howie Schneider, begins syndication.
- September 6: Formiche rosse (Red Ants), by Gian Luigi Bonelli and Guglielmo Letteri; the Egyptian El Morisco, scholar of occult arts and partner of Tex Willer in many stories of a supernatural nature, makes his debut.
- September 9 : in Pilote, Asterix in Britain, by Goscinny and Uderzo.
- September 17: Gli adoratori del sole (The sun's worshippers) by Guido Nolitta and Gallieno Ferri; the clumsy detective Bat Batterton, recurring character in the Zagor's adventures, make his debut.
- September 18: The first issue of the British comics magazine Ranger is published. It will run until 18 June 1966. In its first issue Mike Butterworth and Don Lawrence's The Trigan Empire makes its debut.
- September 20: Bob Weber Sr.'s Moose makes its debut, which will be retitled to Moose Miller in 1971 and eventually Moose & Molly in 1998. The series will continue until 2020.
- September 30:
- The final episode of Red Ryder is published.
- The final issue of Help! is published.
- Dutch comics artist Marten Toonder moves to Greystones, Ireland.

=== October ===
- October 10: In Charles M. Schulz' Peanuts Snoopy first imagines fighting The Red Baron, which becomes a running gag.
- October 14: in Spirou, Bravo les brothers, cross-over between the universes of Spirou & Fantasio and Gaston Lagaffe.
- October 17: In the Disney magazine Topolino, Paperino e le vacanze solitarie, by Rodolfo Cimino and Giovan Battista Carpi is first published. It marks the debut of Anacleto Mitraglia, the equivalent of Neighbor Jones in the Italian Disney comics.
- October 28:
- in Spirou, Calamity Jane, by Goscinny and Morris.
- In the 98th issue of Mad Al Jaffee's Snappy Answers To Stupid Questions makes its debut.

=== November ===
- November 26: The first French satellite A-1 is launched, which is later renamed Astérix, after the eponymous comics character.

=== December ===
- December 9: The final episode of Bob van den Born's Professor Pi is published.
- December 19: Jean Tabary's Corinne et Jeannot, a spin-off of Totoche, first appears in print in the magazine Vaillant.
- Dell Comics publishes Lobo, starring the first African-American character to headline his own series. The stories are written by Don "D. J." Arneson and drawn by Tony Tallarico.
- In issue #31 of The Amazing Spider-Man, Gwen Stacy makes her debut. The same issue also introduces Marvel's readers' column, Bullpen Bulletins.

=== Specific date unknown ===
- Jack Davis returns to Mad.
- The comic strip Art's Gallery, by Art Finley begins syndication.
- The final episode of Philip Mendoza's Gulliver Guinea-Pig is published.
- Robert L. Short publishes the book The Gospel According to Peanuts.

== Births ==
- November 17: Ron Marz, American comic writer (Green Lantern, Superman).

== Deaths ==
=== January ===
- January 1: Leo Morey, Peruvian-American illustrator and comics artist, dies at age 65.
- January 21:
  - Carl Buettner, American illustrator and comics artist (Disney comics), dies at age 61.
  - Reino Helismaa, Finnish lyricist, musician and comics writer (Maan mies Marsissa), dies at age 51.
- Specific date unknown: January: U.S. Abell, American comics artist and illustrator (made Christian comics), dies at age 78.

=== February ===
- February 1: Harry Donenfeld, American comics publisher (National Allied Publications), dies at age 71.
- February 7: Ralph Lane, American comics artist (Vic Flynt, assisted on Buz Sawyer, Captain Easy), dies at age 59 or 60.

=== March ===
- March 9: Jimmy Murphy, American comics artist (Toots and Casper, It's Poppa Who Pays), dies at age 73.

=== April ===
- April 22: Harvey Eisenberg, American animator and comics artist (Hanna-Barbera comics), dies at age 53.

=== June ===
- June 5: Vernon Greene, American comics artist (continued Bringing Up Father), dies at age 64.
- June 11: Fougasse, British cartoonist (Punch), dies at age 77.
- June 11: Frank Tinsley, American illustrator and comic artist (Bill Barnes, Yankee Doodle A.K.A. Captain Yank), dies at age 65.
- Specific date unknown: Roy Wilson, British comics artist (George the Jolly Gee Gee, Chimpo's Circus worked for Funny Wonder, Film Fun and TV Fun), dies at age 64.

=== July ===
- July 14: Marianne Frimberger, Austrian children's book illustrator and comics artist (Die fünf Negerlein), dies at age 88.

=== August ===
- August 2: Ving Fuller, American comics artist (Doc Syke), dies at age 62.
- August 15: Julio E. Suárez, Uruguayan radio presenter, painter, caricaturist, teacher, journalist and comics artist (Peloduro, Cocona en el país de las Hormigas), dies at age 59.

=== September ===
- September 1: René Giffey, French illustrator and comics artist (Ninette et Cloclo, M. Dupont, Détective, Nigaude et Malicette, Les Frôle-la-Mort, Jean Lion le Spahi, Les Assiégés de Médine, Le Capitaine Fracasse, Les Compagnons de Jéhu, Cinq-Mars, Colomba, La Vénus d'Ille and Carmen, continued L'Espiègle Lili), dies at age 81.
- September 11: Valentí Castanys Borràs, Spanish radio presenter and comics artist (Pepito Holmes, Sergapo, el Lusitano, El vado del valor, Andanzas de Loanillo, Don Bartolo, Gotán, el Mono Sabio), dies at age 67.
- September 12: André Galland, French illustrator, journalist, poster designer and comics artist (Achille Costaud, Ninette et Cloclo, continued L'Espiègle Lili and Marco, Gars du Voyage), dies at age 79.
- September 21: Malcolm Wheeler-Nicholson, American pulp magazine writer and entrepreneur (founder of DC Comics), dies at age 75.

=== October ===
- October 18: Conrado W. Massaguer, Cuban cartoonist and comics artist, dies at age 76.
- October 29: Ted Brodie-Mack, New Zealand editorial cartoonist, sports cartoonist and comic artist (Kazanda), dies at age 68.

=== November ===
- November 9: Eduardo Abela, Cuban comics artist, painter and illustrator (El Bobo), dies at age 76.

=== December ===
- December 8: Jack Gordon, British comics artist (worked for The Beano), dies at age 74 or 75.
- December 15: Albert Dorne, American illustrator and comic artist (made advertising comics), dies at age 59.

=== Specific date unknown ===
- Robert Louis Raemakers, Jr., Dutch illustrator and comics artist (continued Flippie Flink), dies at age 55 or 56 from injuries he suffered during a car accident.
- Maurice Ketten, Italian comics artist (Can You Beat It, Such Is Life, Poor Little Income), dies at age 89 or 90.
- Quincy Scott, American cartoonist and comics artist (Horseback Honeymoon), dies at age 82 or 83.
- Sep E. Scott, British comic artist, illustrator and painter (drew comics for Knockout, Sun and Thriller Comics Library), dies at age 85 or 86.

== Publications ==
=== January ===
- 12 O'Clock High (1965 series) #1 – Dell Comics
- 80 Page Giant (1964 series) #6 – DC Comics
- Action Comics (1938 series) #320 – DC Comics
- Adventure Comics (1938 series) #328 – DC Comics
- Alvin (1962 series) #10 – Dell Comics
- The Amazing Spider-Man (1963 series) #20 – Marvel Comics – The first appearance of the Scorpion by writer Stan Lee and artist Steve Ditko
- Archie Giant Series (1954 series) #31 – Archie Publications
- Archie's Girls Betty and Veronica (1951 series) #109 – Archie Publications
- Archie's Joke Book (1953 series) #84 – Archie Publications
- The Atom (1962 series) #16 – DC Comics
- The Avengers (1963 series) #12 – Marvel Comics
- Baby Huey and Papa (1962 series) #15 – Harvey Comics
- Baby Huey in Duckland (1962 series) #8 – Harvey Comics
- Battlefield Action (1957 series) #56 – Charlton Comics
- The Beverly Hillbillies (1963 series) #8 – Dell Comics
- Billy the Kid (1956 series) #48 – Charlton Comics
- Blackhawk (1944 series) #204 – DC Comics
- Blue Beetle (1964 series) #4 – Charlton Comics
- The Brave and the Bold (1955 series) #57 – The first appearance of Metamorpho by writer Bob Haney and artist Ramona Fradon.
- Bugs Bunny (1942 series) #97 – Gold Key Comics
- Car 54, Where Are You? (1964 series) #4 (second printing) – Dell Comics
- Career Girl Romances (1964 series) #27 – Charlton Comics
- Casper the Friendly Ghost (1958 series) #77 – Harvey Comics
- Casper's Ghostland (1958 series) #74 – Harvey Comics
- Challengers of the Unknown (1958 series) #41 – DC Comics
- Combat (1961 series) #15 – Dell Comics
- Cracked (1958 series) #41 – Major Magazines
- Daniel Boone (1965 series) #1 – Gold Key Comics
- Dennis the Menace (1953 series) #76 – Hallden-Fawcett
- Detective Comics (1937 series) #335 – DC Comics
- Devil Kids Starring Hot Stuff (1962 series) #16 – Harvey Comics
- Doctor Solar (1962 series) #10 – Gold Key Comics
- Donald Duck (1940 series) #99 – Gold Key Comics
- Dragstrip Hotrodders (1963 series) #2 – Charlton Comics
- Falling in Love (1955 series) #72 – DC Comics
- Fantastic Four (1961 series) #34 – Marvel Comics – The first appearance of Gregory Gideon by writer Stan Lee and artist Jack Kirby
- Felix the Cat (1962 series) #10 – Dell Comics
- Fightin' Air Force (1956 series) #47 – Charlton Comics
- Fightin' Army (1956 series) #61 – Charlton Comics
- First Kiss (1957 series) #40 – Charlton Comics
- The Flintstones (1961 series) #24 – Gold Key Comics
- Forbidden Worlds (1951 series) #125 – American Comics Group
- The Fox and the Crow (1951 series) #89 – DC Comics
- Ghost Stories (1962 series) #9 – Dell Comics
- G.I. Combat (1952 series) #109 – DC Comics
- Girls' Love Stories (1949 series) #108 – DC Comics
- Girls' Romances (1950 series) #106 – DC Comics
- Green Lantern (1960 series) #34 – DC Comics
- Gunmaster (1964 series) #3 – Charlton Comics
- Harvey Hits (1958 series) #88 – Harvey Comics
- Heart Throbs (1950 series) #93 – DC Comics
- Hot Rods and Racing Cars (1951 series) #72 – Charlton Comics
- House of Mystery (1951 series) #148 – DC Comics
- Idaho (1963 series) #6 – Dell Comics
- The Jetsons (1963 series) #13 – Gold Key Comics
- Journey into Mystery (1952 series) #112 – Marvel Comics – Thor battles the Hulk
- Jughead (1949 series) #116 – Archie Publications
- Jungle War Stories (1962 series) #10 – Dell Comics
- Kid Colt Outlaw (1948 series) #120 – Marvel Comics
- Kona (1962 series) #13 – Dell Comics
- Laugh Comics (1946 series) #166 – Archie Publications
- Life with Archie (1958 series) #33 – Archie Publications
- Lil' Genius (1954 series) #52 – Charlton Comics
- Little Audrey and Melvin (1962 series) #16 – Harvey Comics
- Little Dot Dotland (1962 series) #16 – Harvey Comics
- Little Lotta (1955 series) #57 – Harvey Comics
- Love Diary (1958 series) #36 – Charlton Comics
- Mad (1952 series) #92 – EC Comics
- Marine War Heroes (1964 series) #6 – Charlton Comics
- Marines Attack (1964 series) #3 – Charlton Comics
- Mary Poppins (1965 series) #1 – Gold Key Comics
- Metal Men (1963 series) #11 – DC Comics
- Mighty Mouse (1955 series) #162 – Gold Key Comics
- Millie the Model (1946 series) #126 – Marvel Comics
- Montana Kid (1957 series) #49 – Charlton Comics
- The Munsters (1965 series) #1 – Gold Key Comics
- Mutt and Jeff (1939 series) #143 – Harvey Comics
- Navy War Heroes (1964 series) #6 – Charlton Comics
- Our Army at War (1952 series) #150 – DC Comics
- Our Fighting Forces (1954 series) #89 – DC Comics
- The Outer Limits (1964 series) #5 – Dell Comics
- Pep Comics (1940 series) #177 – Archie Publications
- Petticoat Junction (1964 series) #2 – Dell Comics
- Peter Potamus (1965 series) #1 – Gold Key Comics
- Ponytail (1962 series) #9 – Dell Comics
- Porky Pig (1965 series) #1 – Gold Key Comics
- Richie Rich (1960 series) #29 – Harvey Comics
- Richie Rich Dollars and Cents (1963 series) #7 – Harvey Comics
- Romantic Story (1949 series) #75 – Charlton Comics
- Sad Sack (1949 series) #161 – Harvey Comics
- Sad Sack's Funny Friends (1955 series) #55 – Harvey Comics
- Sad Sad Sack World (1964 series) #2 – Harvey Comics
- Secret Hearts (1952 series) #101 – DC Comics
- Sgt. Fury and his Howling Commandos (1963 series) #14 – Marvel Comics
- The Shadow (1964 series) #4 – Archie Publications
- Six-Gun Heroes (1950 series) #82 – Charlton Comics
- Star Spangled War Stories (1952 series) #118 – DC Comics
- Strange Adventures (1950 series) #172 – DC Comics
- Strange Suspense Stories (1952 series) #73 – Charlton Comics
- Strange Tales (1951 series) #128 – Marvel Comics
- Submarine Attack (1958 series) #48 – Charlton Comics
- Sugar & Spike (1956 series) #56 – DC Comics
- Superboy (1949 series) #118 – DC Comics
- Superman (1939 series) #174 – DC Comics
- Superman's Girlfriend Lois Lane (1958 series) #54 – DC Comics
- Superman's Pal Jimmy Olsen (1954 series) #82 – DC Comics
- Sweethearts (1954 series) #80 – Charlton Comics
- Tales of Suspense (1959 series) #61 – Marvel Comics
- Tales of the Unexpected (1956 series) #86 – DC Comics
- Tales to Astonish (1959 series) #63 – Marvel Comics
- Teen-Age Love (1958 series) #40 – Charlton Comics
- Texas Rangers in Action (1956 series) #48 – Charlton Comics
- The Three Stooges (1960 series) #21 – Gold Key Comics
- Top Cat (1962 series) #13 – Gold Key Comics
- Tuff Ghosts Starring Spooky (1962 series) #14 – Harvey Comics
- Turok Son of Stone (1956 series) #43 – Gold Key Comics
- Two-Gun Kid (1948 series) #73 – Marvel Comics
- Unusual Tales (1955 series) #48 – Charlton Comics
- U.S. Air Force Comics (1958 series) #36 – Charlton Comics
- Walt Disney's Christmas Parade (1963 series) #3 – Gold Key Comics
- Wonder Woman (1942 series) #151 – DC Comics
- Wyatt Earp (1956 series) #56 – Charlton Comics
- Uncanny X-Men (1963 series) #9 – Marvel Comics – The first appearance of Lucifer by writer Stan Lee and artist Jack Kirby. The first meeting of the Avengers and the X-Men.
- Yogi Bear (1959 series) #19 – Gold Key Comics
- Young Romance (1947 series) #133 – DC comics

=== February ===
- 80 Page Giant (1964 series) #7 – DC Comics
- Action Comics (1938 series) #321 – DC Comics
- Adventure Comics (1938 series) #329 – DC Comics
- The Adventures of Bob Hope (1950 series) #91 – DC Comics
- The Adventures of Jerry Lewis (1957 series) #86 – DC Comics
- All-American Men of War (1952 series) #107 – DC Comics
- The Amazing Spider-Man (1963 series) #21 – Marvel Comics
- Aquaman (1962 series) #19 – DC Comics
- The Avengers (1963 series) #13 – Marvel Comics – The first appearance of Count Nefaria and the Maggia by writer Stan Lee and artist Don Heck
- Batman (1940 series) #169 – DC Comics
- Blackhawk (1944 series) #205 – DC Comics
- Captain Storm (1964 series) #5 – DC Comics
- Daredevil (1964 series) #6 – Marvel Comics – The first appearance of Mr. Fear by writer Stan Lee and artist Wally Wood
- Detective Comics (1937 series) #336 – DC Comics
- The Doom Patrol (1964 series) #93 – DC Comics
- Falling in Love (1955 series) #73 – DC Comics
- Fantastic Four (1961 series) #35 – Marvel Comics – The first appearance of Dragon Man by writer Stan Lee and artist Jack Kirby
- The Flash (1959 series) #150 – DC Comics
- The Fox and the Crow (1951 series) #90 – DC Comics
- Girls' Love Stories (1949 series) #109 – DC Comics
- House of Secrets (1956 series) #70 – DC Comics
- Journey into Mystery (1952 series) #113 – Marvel Comics
- Justice League of America (1960 series) #33 – DC Comics
- Marvel Collector's Item Classics (1965 series) #1 – Marvel Comics
- Modelling with Millie (1963 series) #37 – Marvel Comics
- Mystery in Space (1951 series) #97 – DC Comics
- Our Army at War (1952 series) #151 – DC Comics
- Our Fighting Forces (1954 series) #90 – DC Comics
- Patsy and Hedy (1952 series) #98 – Marvel Comics
- Patsy Walker (1945 series) #119 – Marvel Comics
- Rawhide Kid (1955 series) #44 – Marvel Comics
- Rip Hunter Time Master (1961 series) #24 – DC Comics
- Sea Devils (1961 series) #21 – DC Comics
- Sgt. Fury and his Howling Commandos (1963 series) #15 – Marvel Comics
- Showcase (1956 series) #54 – DC Comics
- Strange Adventures (1950 series) #173 – DC Comics
- Strange Tales (1951 series) #129 – Marvel Comics
- Superman (1939 series) #175 – DC Comics
- Superman's Girlfriend Lois Lane (1958 series) #55 – DC Comics
- Tales of Suspense (1959 series) #62 – Marvel Comics
- Tales to Astonish (1959 series) #64 – Marvel Comics
- Tomahawk (1950 series) #96 – DC Comics
- Wonder Woman (1942 series) #152 – DC Comics
- World's Finest Comics (1941 series) #147 – DC Comics
- Young Love (1948 series) #47 – DC Comics

=== March ===
- 80 Page Giant (1964 series) #8 – DC Comics
- Action Comics (1938 series) #322 – DC Comics
- Adventure Comics (1938 series) #330 – DC Comics
- The Amazing Spider-Man (1963 series) #22 – Marvel Comics – The first appearance of Princess Python by writer Stan Lee and artist Steve Ditko
- The Atom (1962 series) #17 – DC Comics
- The Avengers (1963 series) #14 – Marvel Comics
- Batman (1940 series) #170 – DC Comics
- Blackhawk (1944 series) #206 – DC Comics
- The Brave and the Bold (1955 series) #58 – DC Comics
- Challengers of the Unknown (1958 series) #42 – DC Comics
- Detective Comics (1937 series) #337 – DC Comics
- The Doom Patrol (1964 series) #94 – DC Comics
- Fantastic Four (1961 series) #36 – Marvel Comics – The first appearance of Medusa and the Frightful Four by writer Stan Lee and artist Jack Kirby
- The Flash (1959 series) #151 – DC Comics
- G.I. Combat (1952 series) #110 – DC Comics
- Girls' Romances (1950 series) #107 – DC Comics
- Green Lantern (1960 series) #35 – DC Comics
- Hawkman (1964 series) #6 – DC Comics
- Heart Throbs (1950 series) #94 – DC Comics
- House of Mystery (1951 series) #149 – DC Comics
- Journey into Mystery (1952 series) #114 – Marvel Comics – The first appearance of Absorbing Man by writer Stan Lee and artist Jack Kirby
- Justice League of America (1960 series) #34 – DC Comics
- Kid Colt Outlaw (1948 series) #121 – Marvel Comics
- Metal Men (1963 series) #12 – DC Comics
- Millie the Model (1946 series) #127 – Marvel Comics
- Mystery in Space (1951 series) #98 – DC Comics
- Our Army at War (1952 series) #152 – DC Comics
- Secret Hearts (1952 series) #102 – DC Comics
- Sgt. Fury and his Howling Commandos (1963 series) #16 – Marvel Comics
- Star Spangled War Stories (1952 series) #119 – DC Comics
- Strange Adventures (1950 series) #174 – DC Comics
- Strange Tales (1951 series) #130 – Marvel Comics – Cameo appearance by the Beatles
- Sugar & Spike (1956 series) #57 – DC Comics
- Superboy (1949 series) #119 – DC Comics
- Superman's Pal Jimmy Olsen (1954 series) #83 – DC Comics
- Tales of Suspense (1959 series) #63 – Marvel Comics – The origin of Captain America is retold for the first time in the Silver Age
- Tales of the Unexpected (1956 series) #87 – DC Comics
- Tales to Astonish (1959 series) #65 – Marvel Comics
- Two-Gun Kid (1948 series) #74 – Marvel Comics
- World's Finest Comics (1941 series) #148 – DC Comics
- Uncanny X-Men (1963 series) #10 – Marvel Comics – The first appearance of Ka-Zar and Zabu by writer Stan Lee and artist Jack Kirby
- Young Romance (1947 series) #134 – DC comics

=== April ===
- 80 Page Giant (1964 series) #9 – DC Comics
- Action Comics (1938 series) #323 – DC Comics
- Adventure Comics (1938 series) #331 – DC Comics
- The Adventures of Bob Hope (1950 series) #92 – DC Comics
- The Adventures of Jerry Lewis (1957 series) #87 – DC Comics
- All-American Men of War (1952 series) #108 – DC Comics
- The Amazing Spider-Man (1963 series) #23 – Marvel Comics
- Aquaman (1962 series) #20 – DC Comics
- The Avengers (1963 series) #15 – Marvel Comics
- Blackhawk (1944 series) #207 – DC Comics
- Captain Storm (1964 series) #6 – DC Comic
- Daredevil (1964 series) #7 – Marvel Comics – First Red Suit
- Detective Comics (1937 series) #338 – DC Comics
- Falling in Love (1955 series) #74 – DC Comics
- Fantastic Four (1961 series) #37 – Marvel Comics
- Girls' Love Stories (1949 series) #110 – DC Comics
- Girls' Romances (1950 series) #108 – DC Comics
- Green Lantern (1960 series) #36 – DC Comics
- House of Mystery (1951 series) #150 – DC Comic
- House of Secrets (1956 series) #71 – DC Comics
- Journey into Mystery (1952 series) #115 – Marvel Comics
- Metal Men (1963 series) #13 – DC Comics
- Modelling with Millie (1963 series) #38 – Marvel Comics
- Our Army at War (1952 series) #153 – DC Comics
- Our Fighting Forces (1954 series) #91 – DC Comics
- Patsy and Hedy (1952 series) #99 – Marvel Comics
- Patsy Walker (1945 series) #120 – Marvel Comics
- Rip Hunter Time Master (1961 series) #25 – DC Comics
- Rawhide Kid (1955 series) #45 – Marvel Comics
- Secret Hearts (1952 series) #103 – DC Comics
- Sgt. Fury and his Howling Commandos (1963 series) #17 – Marvel Comics
- Showcase (1956 series) #55 – DC Comics
- Strange Adventures (1950 series) #175 – DC Comics
- Strange Tales (1951 series) #131 – Marvel Comics
- Superboy (1949 series) #120 – DC Comics
- Superman (1939 series) #176 – DC Comics
- Superman's Girlfriend Lois Lane (1958 series) #56 – DC Comics
- Superman's Pal Jimmy Olsen (1954 series) #84 – DC Comics
- Tales of Suspense (1959 series) #64 – Marvel Comics
- Tales to Astonish (1959 series) #66 – Marvel Comics
- Tomahawk (1950 series) #97 – DC Comics
- Wonder Woman (1942 series) #153 – DC Comics
- Young Love (1948 series) #48 – DC Comics

=== May ===
- 80 Page Giant (1964 series) #10 – DC Comics
- Action Comics (1938 series) #324 – DC Comics
- Adventure Comics (1938 series) #332 – DC Comics – Lightning Lad loses an arm.
- The Amazing Spider-Man (1963 series) #24 – Marvel Comics
- The Atom (1962 series) #18 – DC Comics
- The Avengers (1963 series) #16 – Marvel Comics – A new line-up for the Avengers. The first appearance of Edwin Jarvis by writer Stan Lee and artist Jack Kirby
- Batman (1940 series) #171 – DC Comics – The first Silver Age appearance of the Riddler by writer Gardner Fox and artist Sheldon Moldoff
- Blackhawk (1944 series) #208 – DC Comics
- The Brave and the Bold (1955 series) #59 – DC Comics – The first appearance of the Time Commander by writer Bob Haney and artist Ramona Fradon
- Challengers of the Unknown (1958 series) #43 – DC Comics
- Detective Comics (1937 series) #339 – DC Comics
- The Doom Patrol (1964 series) #95 – DC Comics
- Falling in Love (1955 series) #75 – DC Comics
- Fantastic Four (1961 series) #38 – Marvel Comics
- Fantastic Four Annual (1963 series) #3 – Marvel Comics – The wedding of Sue Storm and Reed Richards by writer Stan Lee and artist Jack Kirby
- The Flash (1959 series) #152 – DC Comics
- The Fox and the Crow (1951 series) #91 – DC Comics
- G.I. Combat (1952 series) #111 – DC Comics
- Girls' Love Stories (1949 series) #111 – DC Comics
- Hawkman (1964 series) #7 – DC Comics
- Heart Throbs (1950 series) #95 – DC Comics
- Journey into Mystery (1952 series) #116 – Marvel Comics
- Justice League of America (1960 series) #35 – DC Comics
- Kid Colt Outlaw (1948 series) #122 – Marvel Comics
- Millie the Model (1946 series) #128 – Marvel Comics
- Mystery in Space (1951 series) #99 – DC Comics
- Our Army at War (1952 series) #154 – DC Comics
- Our Fighting Forces (1954 series) #92 – DC Comics
- Sgt. Fury and his Howling Commandos (1963 series) #18 – Marvel Comics
- Star Spangled War Stories (1952 series) #120 – DC Comics
- Strange Adventures (1950 series) #176 – DC Comics
- Strange Tales (1951 series) #132 – Marvel Comics
- Sugar & Spike (1956 series) #58 – DC Comics
- Superman (1939 series) #177 – DC Comics
- Superman's Girlfriend Lois Lane (1958 series) #57 – DC Comics
- Tales of Suspense (1959 series) #64 – Marvel Comics – The first Silver Age appearance of the Red Skull (revealed to be an imposter; the real one appears in the next issue) by writer Stan Lee and artist Jack Kirby
- Tales of the Unexpected (1956 series) #87 – DC Comics
- Tales to Astonish (1959 series) #67 – Marvel Comics
- Two-Gun Kid (1948 series) #75 – Marvel Comics
- Wonder Woman (1942 series) #154 – DC Comics
- World's Finest Comics (1941 series) #149 – DC Comics
- Uncanny X-Men (1963 series) #11 – Marvel Comics – The first appearance of the Stranger by writer Stan Lee and artist Jack Kirby
- Young Romance (1947 series) #133 – DC comics

=== June ===
- 80 Page Giant (1964 series) #11 – DC Comics
- Action Comics (1938 series) #325 – DC Comics
- Adventure Comics (1938 series) #333 – DC Comics
- The Adventures of Bob Hope (1950 series) #93 – DC Comics
- The Adventures of Jerry Lewis (1957 series) #88 – DC Comics
- All-American Men of War (1952 series) #109 – DC Comics
- The Amazing Spider-Man (1963 series) #25 – Marvel Comics – The first appearance of Mary Jane Watson (cameo) and Spencer Smythe by writer Stan Lee and artist Steve Ditko
- Aquaman (1962 series) #21 – DC Comics
- The Avengers (1963 series) #17 – Marvel Comics
- Batman (1940 series) #172 – DC Comics
- Blackhawk (1944 series) #209 – DC Comics
- Captain Storm (1964 series) #7 – DC Comics
- Daredevil (1964 series) #8 – Marvel Comics – The first appearance of the Stilt-Man by writer Stan Lee and artist Wally Wood
- Detective Comics (1937 series) #340 – DC Comics
- The Doom Patrol (1964 series) #96 – DC Comics
- Fantastic Four (1961 series) #39 – Marvel Comics
- The Flash (1959 series) #153 – DC Comics
- G.I. Combat (1952 series) #112 – DC Comics
- Girls' Romances (1950 series) #109 – DC Comics
- Green Lantern (1960 series) #37 – DC Comics
- House of Mystery (1951 series) #151 – DC Comic
- House of Secrets (1956 series) #72 – DC Comics
- Journey into Mystery (1952 series) #117 – Marvel Comics
- Justice League of America (1960 series) #36 – DC Comics
- Metal Men (1963 series) #14 – DC Comics
- Modelling with Millie (1963 series) #39 – Marvel Comics
- Mystery in Space (1951 series) #100 – DC Comics
- Our Army at War (1952 series) #155 – DC Comics
- Patsy and Hedy (1952 series) #100 – Marvel Comics
- Patsy Walker (1945 series) #121 – Marvel Comics
- Rawhide Kid (1955 series) #46 – Marvel Comics
- Rip Hunter Time Master (1961 series) #26 – DC Comics
- Sea Devils (1961 series) #23 – DC Comics
- Secret Hearts (1952 series) #104 – DC Comics
- Sgt. Fury and his Howling Commandos (1963 series) #19 – Marvel Comics
- Showcase (1956 series) #56 – DC Comics – The first appearance of the Silver Age Psycho-Pirate by writer Gardner Fox and artist Murphy Anderson
- Strange Adventures (1950 series) #177 – DC Comics
- Strange Tales (1951 series) #133 – Marvel Comics
- Superboy (1949 series) #121 – DC Comics
- Superman's Pal Jimmy Olsen (1954 series) #85 – DC Comics
- Tales of Suspense (1959 series) #66 – Marvel Comics – The first Silver Age appearance of the Red Skull (actual) by writer Stan Lee and artist Jack Kirby
- Tales to Astonish (1959 series) #68 – Marvel Comics
- Tomahawk (1950 series) #98 – DC Comics
- World's Finest Comics (1941 series) #150 – DC Comics
- Young Love (1948 series) #49 – DC Comics

=== July ===
- 80 Page Giant (1964 series) #12 – DC Comics
- Action Comics (1938 series) #326 – DC Comics
- Adventure Comics (1938 series) #334 – DC Comics
- The Amazing Spider-Man (1963 series) #26 – Marvel Comics – The first appearance of the Crime Master by writer Stan Lee and artist Steve Ditko
- The Atom (1962 series) #19 – DC Comics
- The Avengers (1963 series) #18 – Marvel Comics
- Blackhawk (1944 series) #210 – DC Comics
- The Brave and the Bold (1955 series) #60 – First named appearance of the Teen Titans. Robin, Kid Flash, and Aqualad joined by Wonder Woman's younger sister Wonder Girl in her first appearance.
- Challengers of the Unknown (1958 series) #44 – DC Comics
- Detective Comics (1937 series) #341 – DC Comics
- Falling in Love (1955 series) #76 – DC Comics
- Fantastic Four (1961 series) #40 – Marvel Comics
- The Fox and the Crow (1951 series) #92 – DC Comics
- Girls' Love Stories (1949 series) #112 – DC Comics
- Girls' Romances (1950 series) #110 – DC Comics
- Green Lantern (1960 series) #38 – DC Comics
- Hawkman (1964 series) #8 – DC Comics
- Heart Throbs (1950 series) #96 – DC Comics
- House of Mystery (1951 series) #152 – DC Comic
- Journey into Mystery (1952 series) #118 – Marvel Comics – The first appearance of the Destroyer by writer Stan Lee and artist Jack Kirby
- Kid Colt Outlaw (1948 series) #123 – Marvel Comics
- Millie the Model (1946 series) #129 – Marvel Comics
- Our Army at War (1952 series) #156 – DC Comics
- Our Fighting Forces (1954 series) #93 – DC Comics
- Secret Hearts (1952 series) #105 – DC Comics
- Sgt. Fury and his Howling Commandos (1963 series) #20 – Marvel Comics
- Star Spangled War Stories (1952 series) #121 – DC Comics
- Strange Adventures (1950 series) #178 – DC Comics
- Strange Tales (1951 series) #134 – Marvel Comics
- Sugar & Spike (1956 series) #60 – DC Comics
- Superboy (1949 series) #122 – DC Comics
- Superman (1939 series) #178 – DC Comics
- Superman's Girlfriend Lois Lane (1958 series) #58 – DC Comics
- Superman's Pal Jimmy Olsen (1954 series) #86 – DC Comics
- Tales of Suspense (1959 series) #67 – Marvel Comics
- Tales of the Unexpected (1956 series) #89 – DC Comics
- Tales to Astonish (1959 series) #69 – Marvel Comics
- Two-Gun Kid (1948 series) #76 – Marvel Comics
- Wonder Woman (1942 series) #155 – DC Comics
- Uncanny X-Men (1963 series) #12 – Marvel Comics – The first appearance of the Juggernaut by writer Stan Lee and artist Jack Kirby
- Young Romance (1947 series) #136 – DC comics

=== August ===
- 80 Page Giant (1964 series) #13 – DC Comics
- Action Comics (1938 series) #327 – DC Comics
- Adventure Comics (1938 series) #335 – DC Comics – The first appearance of Starfinger by writer Edmond Hamilton and artist John Forte
- The Adventures of Bob Hope (1950 series) #94 – DC Comics
- The Adventures of Jerry Lewis (1957 series) #89 – DC Comics
- All-American Men of War (1952 series) #110 – DC Comics
- The Amazing Spider-Man (1963 series) #27 – Marvel Comics
- Aquaman (1962 series) #22 – DC Comics
- The Avengers (1963 series) #19 – Marvel Comics – The first appearance of the Swordsman by writer Stan Lee and artist Don Heck
- Batman (1940 series) #173 – DC Comics
- Blackhawk (1944 series) #211 – DC Comics
- Captain Storm (1964 series) #8 – DC Comic
- Daredevil (1964 series) #9 – Marvel Comics
- Detective Comics (1937 series) #342 – DC Comics
- The Doom Patrol (1964 series) #97 – DC Comics
- Falling in Love (1955 series) #77 – DC Comics
- Fantastic Four (1961 series) #41 – Marvel Comics
- The Flash (1959 series) #154 – DC Comics
- Girls' Love Stories (1949 series) #113 – DC Comics
- House of Secrets (1956 series) #73 – DC Comics
- Journey into Mystery (1952 series) #119 – Marvel Comics – The first appearances of Hogun, Fandral, and Volstagg by writer Stan Lee and artist Jack Kirby
- Justice League of America (1960 series) #37 – DC Comics – Part one of annual team-up with the Justice Society.
- Metamorpho (1965 series) #1 – DC Comics
- Modelling with Millie (1963 series) #40 – Marvel Comics
- Mystery in Space (1951 series) #101 – DC Comics
- Our Army at War (1952 series) #157 – DC Comics
- Our Fighting Forces (1954 series) #94 – DC Comics
- Patsy and Hedy (1952 series) #101 – Marvel Comics
- Patsy Walker (1945 series) #122 – Marvel Comics
- Rawhide Kid (1955 series) #47 – Marvel Comics
- Rip Hunter Time Master (1961 series) #27 – DC Comics
- Sea Devils (1961 series) #24 – DC Comics
- Sgt. Fury and his Howling Commandos (1963 series) #21 – Marvel Comics
- Showcase (1956 series) #57 – DC Comics
- Strange Adventures (1950 series) #179 – DC Comics
- Strange Tales (1951 series) #135 – Marvel Comics – Nick Fury, Agent of SHIELD begins in this issue. The first appearance of SHIELD and HYDRA by writer Stan Lee and artist Jack Kirby
- Superman (1939 series) #179 – DC Comics
- Superman's Girlfriend Lois Lane (1958 series) #59 – DC Comics
- Tales of Suspense (1959 series) #68 – Marvel Comics
- Tales to Astonish (1959 series) #70 – Marvel Comics – The Sub-Mariner begins in this issue.
- Tomahawk (1950 series) #99 – DC Comics
- Wonder Woman (1942 series) #156 – DC Comics
- World's Finest Comics (1941 series) #151 – DC Comics
- Young Love (1948 series) #50 – DC Comics

=== September ===
- 80 Page Giant (1964 series) #14 – DC Comics
- Action Comics (1938 series) #328 – DC Comics
- Adventure Comics (1938 series) #336 – DC Comics
- The Amazing Spider-Man (1963 series) #28 – Marvel Comics – The first appearance of the Molten Man by writer Stan Lee and artist Steve Ditko
- The Amazing Spider-Man Annual (1964 series) #2 – Marvel Comics
- The Atom (1962 series) #20 – DC Comics
- The Avengers (1963 series) #20 – Marvel Comics
- Batman (1940 series) #174 – DC Comics
- Blackhawk (1944 series) #212 – DC Comics
- The Brave and the Bold (1955 series) #61 – DC Comics
- Challengers of the Unknown (1958 series) #45 – DC Comics
- Detective Comics (1937 series) #343 – DC Comics
- The Doom Patrol (1964 series) #98 – DC Comics
- Fantastic Four (1961 series) #42 – Marvel Comics
- The Flash (1959 series) #155 – DC Comics
- The Fox and the Crow (1951 series) #93 – DC Comics
- G.I. Combat (1952 series) #113 – DC Comics
- Girls' Romances (1950 series) #111 – DC Comics
- Green Lantern (1960 series) #39 – DC Comics
- Hawkman (1964 series) #9 – DC Comics
- Heart Throbs (1950 series) #97 – DC Comics
- Help!, with vol. 2, #14, canceled by Warren Publishing
- House of Mystery (1951 series) #153 – DC Comic
- Journey into Mystery (1952 series) #120 – Marvel Comics
- Justice League of America (1960 series) #37 – DC Comics – Part two of annual team-up with the Justice Society.
- Kid Colt Outlaw (1948 series) #124 – Marvel Comics
- Metal Men (1963 series) #15 – DC Comics
- Millie the Model (1946 series) #130 – Marvel Comics
- Modelling with Millie (1963 series) #41 – Marvel Comics
- Mystery in Space (1951 series) #102 – DC Comics – last appearance of Adam Strange in Mystery in Space
- Our Army at War (1952 series) #158 – DC Comics
- Secret Hearts (1952 series) #106 – DC Comics
- Sgt. Fury and his Howling Commandos (1963 series) #22 – Marvel Comics
- Star Spangled War Stories (1952 series) #122 – DC Comics
- Strange Adventures (1950 series) #180 – first appearance of Animal Man
- Strange Tales (1951 series) #136 – Marvel Comics
- Superboy (1949 series) #123 – DC Comics
- Superman's Pal Jimmy Olsen (1954 series) #87 – DC Comics
- Tales of Suspense (1959 series) #69 – Marvel Comics
- Tales of the Unexpected (1956 series) #90 – DC Comics
- Tales to Astonish (1959 series) #71 – Marvel Comics
- Two-Gun Kid (1948 series) #77 – Marvel Comics
- World's Finest Comics (1941 series) #152 – DC Comics
- Uncanny X-Men (1963 series) #13 – Marvel Comics
- Young Romance (1947 series) #137 – DC comics

=== October ===
- Harvey Thriller line debuts with Unearthly Spectaculars #1, Thrill-O-Rama #1, Blast-Off #1, and Warfront #36 — Harvey Comics
- 80 Page Giant (1964 series) #15 – DC Comics
- Action Comics (1938 series) #329 – DC Comics
- Adventure Comics (1938 series) #337 – DC Comics
- The Adventures of Bob Hope (1950 series) #95 – DC Comics
- The Adventures of Jerry Lewis (1957 series) #90 – DC Comics
- All-American Men of War (1952 series) #111 – DC Comics
- The Amazing Spider-Man (1963 series) #29 – Marvel Comics
- Aquaman (1962 series) #22 – DC Comics – The birth of Aquababy
- The Avengers (1963 series) #21 – Marvel Comics – The first appearance of Power Man by writer Stan Lee and artist Don Heck
- Batman (1940 series) #175 – DC Comics
- Blackhawk (1944 series) #213 – DC Comics
- Captain Storm (1964 series) #9- DC Comic
- Daredevil (1964 series) #10 – Marvel Comics – The first appearance of the Organizer, Cat-Man, Ape-Man, Frog-Man, and Bird-Man by writer-artist Wally Wood
- Detective Comics (1937 series) #344 – DC Comics
- Falling in Love (1955 series) #78 – DC Comics
- Fantastic Four (1961 series) #43 – Marvel Comics
- Girls' Love Stories (1949 series) #114 – DC Comics
- Girls' Romances (1950 series) #112 – DC Comics
- Green Lantern (1960 series) #40 – DC Comics – The first appearance of Krona by writer John Broome and artist Gil Kane
- House of Mystery (1951 series) #154 – DC Comic
- House of Secrets (1956 series) #74 – DC Comics
- Journey into Mystery (1952 series) #121 – Marvel Comics
- Metamorpho (1965 series) #2 – DC Comics
- Millie the Model (1946 series) #131 – Marvel Comics
- Modelling with Millie (1963 series) #42 – Marvel Comics
- Our Army at War (1952 series) #159 – DC Comics
- Our Fighting Forces (1954 series) #95 – DC Comics
- Patsy and Hedy (1952 series) #102 – Marvel Comics
- Patsy Walker (1945 series) #123 – Marvel Comics
- Rawhide Kid (1955 series) #48 – Marvel Comics
- Rip Hunter Time Master (1961 series) #28 – DC Comics
- Sea Devils (1961 series) #25 – DC Comics
- Secret Hearts (1952 series) #107 – DC Comics
- Sgt. Fury and his Howling Commandos (1963 series) #23 – Marvel Comics
- Showcase (1956 series) #58 – DC Comics
- Strange Adventures (1950 series) #181 – DC Comics
- Strange Tales (1951 series) #137 – Marvel Comics
- Superboy (1949 series) #124 – DC Comics
- Superman (1939 series) #180 – DC Comics
- Superman's Girlfriend Lois Lane (1958 series) #60 – DC Comics
- Superman's Pal Jimmy Olsen (1954 series) #88 – DC Comics
- Tales of Suspense (1959 series) #70 – Marvel Comics
- Tales to Astonish (1959 series) #72 – Marvel Comics
- Tomahawk (1950 series) #100 – DC Comics
- Wonder Woman (1942 series) #157 – DC Comics – The first appearance of Egg Fu by writer Robert Kanigher and artist Ross Andru
- Young Love (1948 series) #51 – DC Comics

=== November ===
- Action Comics (1938 series) #330 – DC Comics
- Adventure Comics (1938 series) #338 – DC Comics
- The Amazing Spider-Man (1963 series) #30 – Marvel Comics – The first appearance of the Cat by writer Stan Lee and artist Steve Ditko
- The Atom (1962 series) #21 – DC Comics
- The Avengers (1963 series) #22 – Marvel Comics
- Batman (1940 series) #176 – DC Comics – 80-page Giant
- Blackhawk (1944 series) #214 – DC Comics
- The Brave and the Bold (1955 series) #62 – DC Comics
- Challengers of the Unknown (1958 series) #46 – DC Comics
- Detective Comics (1937 series) #345 – DC Comics – The first appearance of Blockbuster by writer Gardner Fox and artist Carmine Infantino
- The Doom Patrol (1964 series) #99 – DC Comics – The first appearance of Beast Boy by writer Arnold Drake and artist Bob Brown
- Falling in Love (1955 series) #79 – DC Comics
- Fantastic Four (1961 series) #44 – Marvel Comics The first appearance of Gorgon by writer Stan Lee and artist Jack Kirby
- The Flash (1959 series) #156 – DC Comics
- The Fox and the Crow (1951 series) #94 – DC Comics
- G.I. Combat (1952 series) #114 – DC Comics
- Girls' Love Stories (1949 series) #115 – DC Comics
- Hawkman (1964 series) #10 – DC Comics
- Heart Throbs (1950 series) #98 – DC Comics
- Journey into Mystery (1952 series) #122 – Marvel Comics
- Journey into Mystery Annual (1965 series) #1 – Marvel Comics – The first appearance of Hercules by writer Stan Lee and artist Jack Kirby
- Justice League of America (1960 series) #39 – DC Comics – 80-page Giant
- Justice League of America (1960 series) #40 – DC Comics
- Kid Colt Outlaw (1948 series) #125 – Marvel Comics
- Metal Men (1963 series) #16 – DC Comics
- Millie the Model (1946 series) #132 – Marvel Comics
- Modelling with Millie (1963 series) #43 – Marvel Comics
- Mystery in Space (1951 series) #103 – DC Comics – The first appearance of Ultra the Multi-Alien by writer Dave Wood and artist Lee Elias
- Our Army at War (1952 series) #160 – DC Comics
- Our Fighting Forces (1954 series) #96 – DC Comics
- Sgt. Fury and his Howling Commandos (1963 series) #24 – Marvel Comics
- Sgt. Fury and his Howling Commandos Annual (1965 series) #1 – Marvel Comics
- Star Spangled War Stories (1952 series) #123 – DC Comics
- Strange Adventures (1950 series) #182 – DC Comics
- Strange Tales (1951 series) #138 – Marvel Comics – The first appearance of Eternity by writer Stan Lee and artist Steve Ditko
- Sugar & Spike (1956 series) #61 – DC Comics
- Superman (1939 series) #181 – DC Comics – The first appearance of the Superman of 2965 by writer Edmond Hamilton and artist Curt Swan
- Superman's Girlfriend Lois Lane (1958 series) #61 – DC Comics
- Tales of Suspense (1959 series) #71 – Marvel Comics
- Tales of the Unexpected (1956 series) #91 – DC Comics
- Tales to Astonish (1959 series) #73 – Marvel Comics
- Two-Gun Kid (1948 series) #78 – Marvel Comics
- Wonder Woman (1942 series) #158 – DC Comics
- World's Finest Comics (1941 series) #153 – DC Comics
- Uncanny X-Men (1963 series) #14 – Marvel Comics – The first appearance of the Sentinels by writer Stan Lee and artists Jack Kirby and Werner Roth
- Young Romance (1947 series) #137 – DC comics

=== December ===
- Action Comics (1938 series) #331 – DC Comics
- Adventure Comics (1938 series) #339 – DC Comics
- The Adventures of Bob Hope (1950 series) #96 – DC Comics
- The Adventures of Jerry Lewis (1957 series) #91 – DC Comics
- All-American Men of War (1952 series) #112 – DC Comics
- The Amazing Spider-Man (1963 series) #31 – Marvel Comics – The first appearances of Gwen Stacy, Harry Osborn, and Miles Warren by writer Stan Lee and artist Steve Ditko
- Aquaman (1962 series) #24 – DC Comics
- The Avengers (1963 series) #23 – Marvel Comics
- Batman (1940 series) #177 – DC Comics
- Blackhawk (1944 series) #215 – DC Comics
- Captain Storm (1964 series) #10 – DC Comic
- Daredevil (1964 series) #11 – Marvel Comics
- Detective Comics (1937 series) #346 – DC Comics
- The Doom Patrol (1964 series) #100 – DC Comics
- Fantastic Four (1961 series) #45 – Marvel Comics – The first appearances of the Inhumans – Black Bolt, Crystal, Karnak, Triton, and Lockjaw by writer Stan Lee and artist Jack Kirby
- The Flash (1959 series) #157 – DC Comics
- The Fox and the Crow (1951 series) #95 – DC Comics
- Girls' Romances (1950 series) #113 – DC Comics
- Green Lantern (1960 series) #41 – DC Comics
- House of Mystery (1951 series) #155 – DC Comic
- House of Secrets (1956 series) #75 – DC Comics
- Journey into Mystery (1952 series) #123 – Marvel Comics
- Justice League of America (1960 series) #41 – DC Comics
- Metamorpho (1965 series) #3 – DC Comics
- Millie the Model (1946 series) #133 – Marvel Comics
- Modelling with Millie (1963 series) #44 – Marvel Comics
- Mystery in Space (1951 series) #104 – DC Comics
- Our Army at War (1952 series) #161 – DC Comics
- Patsy and Hedy (1952 series) #103 – Marvel Comics
- Patsy Walker (1945 series) #124 – Marvel Comics
- Rawhide Kid (1955 series) #49 – Marvel Comics
- Rip Hunter Time Master (1961 series) #29 – DC Comics – Final issue in the series.
- Sea Devils (1961 series) #26 – DC Comics
- Secret Hearts (1952 series) #108 – DC Comics
- Sgt. Fury and his Howling Commandos (1963 series) #25 – Marvel Comics
- Showcase (1956 series) #59 – DC Comics
- Strange Adventures (1950 series) #183 – DC Comics
- Strange Tales (1951 series) #139 – Marvel Comics
- Superboy (1949 series) #125 – DC Comics – The first appearance of Kid Psycho by writer Otto Binder and artist George Papp
- Superman (1939 series) #182 – DC Comics
- Superman's Pal Jimmy Olsen (1954 series) #89 – DC Comics
- Tales of Suspense (1959 series) #72 – Marvel Comics
- Tales to Astonish (1959 series) #74 – Marvel Comics
- Tomahawk (1950 series) #101 – DC Comics
- World's Finest Comics (1941 series) #154 – DC Comics
- Uncanny X-Men (1963 series) #15 – Marvel Comics
- Young Love (1948 series) #52 – DC Comics

== Awards ==
=== National Cartoonists Society Division Awards ===
- Newspaper Comic Strips (Humor): Gordo, by Gus Arriola
- Newspaper Comic Strips (Story): Buz Sawyer, by Roy Crane
- Newspaper Panel Cartoons: Berry's World, by Jim Berry
- Gag Cartoons: Orlando Busino
- Comic Books: Wallace Wood
- Advertising and Illustration: Ronald Searle
- Editorial Cartoons: John Fischetti
- Sports Cartoons: Willard Mullin
- Special Features: Flubs and Fluffs, by Jerry Robinson
- Reuben Award: Mary Perkins, On Stage, by Leonard Starr

== First issues by title ==
=== Other publishers ===
Lenny of Laredo

Release: by Joel Beck (self-published). Writer/Artist: Joel Beck

== Initial appearance by character name ==
=== DC Comics ===
- Animal Man, in Strange Adventures #180 (September)
- Beast Boy, in Doom Patrol #99 (November)
- Blockbuster, in Detective Comics #345 (November)
- Donna Troy, in The Brave and the Bold #60 (July)
- Evil Star, in Green Lantern #37 (June)
- Fisherman, in Aquaman #21 (June)
- Glorith, in Adventure Comics #338 (November)
- Golden Boy, in Adventure Comics #331 (April)
- Goldface, in Green Lantern (vol. 2) #38 (July)
- Immortal Man, in Strange Adventures #177 (June)
- Java, in Brave and the Bold #57 (January)
- Judomaster, in Special War Series #4 (November)
- Key, in Justice League of America #41 (December)
- Kid Psycho, in Superboy #125 (December)
- Krona, in Green Lantern #40 (October)
- Metamorpho, in Brave and the Bold #57 (January)
- Magnetic Kid, in Adventure Comics #335 (August)
- Prince Ra-Man, in House of Secrets #73 (July)
- Psycho-Pirate, in Showcase #56 (June)
- Sapphire Stagg, in Brave and the Bold #57 (January)
- Simon Stagg, in Brave and the Bold #57 (January)
- Starfinger, in Adventure Comics #335 (August)
- Ultra the Multi-Alien, in Mystery in Space #103 (November)

=== Other publishers ===
- Fritz the Cat, in Help! (Jan.)

== Conventions ==
- February 21–22: Salone Internazionale dei Comics ("International Congress of Comics") (Bordighera, Italy) — sponsored by Rinaldo Traini and Romano Calisi of the International Congress of Cartoonists and Animators, this is the antecedent to Lucca Comics & Games
- July 24–25: Detroit Triple Fan Fair (Embassy Hotel, Detroit, Michigan) — first annual staging of the ground-breaking multigenre convention
- July 31 – August 1: Academy Con I (Broadway Central Hotel, New York City) — sponsored by the Academy of Comic-Book Fans and Collectors and produced by teacher/comics enthusiast Dave Kaler (officially known as "Comi Con: Second Annual Convention of Academy of Comic-Book Fans and Collectors") 200 attendees; official guests include Otto Binder, Bill Finger, Gardner Fox, Mort Weisinger, James Warren, Roy Thomas, and Gil Kane
