= Neutron (disambiguation) =

A neutron is a subatomic particle.

Neutron may also refer to:

== Fiction ==
- Neutron (comics), the name of several comic book characters:
  - Neutron (DC Comics), a DC Comics character
  - Neutron (Linus), an Italian comics character that appeared in Linus
  - Neutron (Marvel Comics), a Marvel Comics character
- Mr Neutron, character from Monty Python's Flying Circus
- Neutron, cat from the film This Island Earth
- Neutron, surname of several characters in the Jimmy Neutron franchise
- Jimmy Neutron (disambiguation)

== Other uses ==
- Neutron (game), an abstract strategy game
- Neutron (OpenStack component), provides networking services to the platform
- Rocket Lab Neutron, a medium-lift launch vehicle under development by Rocket Lab
- Neutron (synthesizer), a 2018 monosynth

== See also ==
- Neutronium, state of matter, proposed element, fictional material
