= Neutron (comics) =

Neutron may refer to several comic book characters:

- Neutron (DC Comics), a DC Comics character
- Neutron (Linus), an Italian comics character from Linus
- Neutron (Marvel Comics), a Marvel Comics character

== See also ==
- Neutron (disambiguation)
