= Letteri =

Letteri is an Italian surname. Notable people with the surname include:

- Guglielmo Letteri (1926–2006), Italian comic book artist
- Joe Letteri (born 1957), American visual effects artist
