= 1954 in comics =

Notable events of 1954 in comics.

== Events and publications ==
- Publishers Comic Media, Fiction House, Star Publications, and Youthful go out of business.

=== February ===
- February 3: A controversial cartoon by Leslie Illingworth in Punch shows a visibly old and tired Winston Churchill behind his desk. It instantly causes outrage and scandal.
- February 13: Leo Baxendale's The Bash Street Kids makes its debut in The Beano, but is still named When the Bell Rings in this period. It will receive its definitive title on 11 November 1956.
- February 15: on the Daily Express, the first strip of Jeff Hawke, by Sydney Jordan, appears.
- February 27: The first issue of the British comics magazine Jack and Jill is published. It will run until 29 June 1985.
- Hopalong Cassidy, with issue #86, revived by DC Comics, taking over the numbering of the Fawcett Comics series.
- The first issue of the American comics magazine Panic is published.
- Journey into Mystery (1952 series) #14 - Atlas Comics

=== March ===
- March 1: The Billy DeBeck Awards are renamed the Reuben Awards.
- March 4: Jijé's Jerry Spring makes its debut.
- March 20: Marten Toonder's Koning Hollewijn makes its debut. It will run until 26 June 1971.
- March 20: First issue of the British comics magazine Swift is published. It will run until 2 March 1963.
- Atlas Comics publishes Lorna, the Jungle Girl #6 (renamed from Lorna, the Jungle Queen)
- The magazines Weird science and Weird fantasy (EC comics) merge in Weird Science-Fantasy.
- The secret of Atlantis, by Carl Barks, on Uncle Scrooge.

=== April ===
- April: The 10th issue of Mad Magazine is released. Inside, Harvey Kurtzman and Will Elder's parody of Wonder Woman is first printed.
- April 14: Raymond Macherot's Chlorophylle makes its debut.
- April 19: German-American psychiatrist Fredric Wertham publishes his treatise Seduction of the Innocent. The book warns that comic books are a negative form of popular literature and a serious cause of juvenile delinquency. A minor bestseller, it alarms parents, teachers and moral guardians and galvanized them to campaign for comics censorship.
- April 21–22: United States Senate Subcommittee on Juvenile Delinquency hearings on the comic book industry. Fredric Wertham also testifies, accusing comics publishers of their bad influence on the youth.
- In Italy, Avventure nel West, by Edizioni Audace (Bonelli), series reprinting Italian Western comics, makes its debut.
- Journey into Mystery (1952 series) #15 - Atlas Comics

=== May ===
- May 1: The 11th issue of Mad Magazine is published, featuring Basil Wolverton's iconic parody of the Beautiful Girl of the Month on the cover.
- May 16: In Italy, the first issues of Albi della rosa (reprints of Disney comics, aimed to the youngest readers) and Albi del falco (adventures of Superman, renamed Nembo Kid, and later also of the other DC heroes) are published by Mondadori. The second magazine, lasted till 1970, makes superheroes comics popular in Italy, even if the original stories are often heavily manipulated or censored.
- In Gilbert, relative genius by Bill Wright, Gilbert, the savant Goofy’s nephew, makes his debut.

=== June ===
- June: The 12th issue of Mad Magazine is released. Inside, Harvey Kurtzman and Will Elder's parody of Archie Comics is first printed.
- June 1: In Charles M. Schulz' Peanuts Linus Van Pelt is first seen with his security blanket.
- June 4: Further meeting of United States Senate Subcommittee on Juvenile Delinquency
- June 24: In the Johan story Le Lutin du Bois aux Roches, prepublished in Spirou the character Pirlouit (Peewit) makes his debut. The series will eventually change its name to Johan and Peewit.
- June 26: Australian comic artist Len Lawson (of The Lone Avenger fame) is sentenced to 14 years for rape and assault. He will be released in 1961 on parole.
- Tralla La, a Scrooge McDuck story by Carl Barks, published in Uncle Scrooge #6.
- The first issue of the Belgian children's magazine Bimbo is published. It will run until February 1956.
- Journey into Mystery (1952 series) #16 - Atlas Comics

=== July ===
- July 13: In Charles M. Schulz' Peanuts Pig-Pen makes his debut.

=== August ===
- August 8: The final episode of Jungle Jim is published.
- August 25: in Topolino, Paperino 3D by Guido Martina and Romano Scarpa; the story, inspired by the recent birth of Italian television, marks the Scarpa’s debut in the duck universe.
- Journey into Mystery (1952 series) #17 - Atlas Comics

=== September ===
- September 4: The last issue of the Dutch comics magazine Grabbelton is published, a supplement of De Katholieke Illustratie.
- September 10: The State of New York bans Nights of Horror (by Joe Shuster) for violating obscenity laws.
- September 11: The first issue of the British comics magazine Tiger is published. It will last until 30 March 1985.
- September 11: Frank S. Pepper and Joe Colquhoun's Roy of the Rovers makes its debut in Fleetway's Tiger
- September 30: The first stories of Daisy Duck’s diary by Dick Moores are published. In the following years, the series will be prosecuted by several American and Italian authors.
- Formation of the Comics Magazine Association of America (CMAA) and the Comics Code Authority (CCA)
- Atlas Comics publishes Crime Fighters Always Win #11 (renamed from Timely's Crimefighters)
- The first issue of the Croatian children's magazine Modra lasta is published.
- Carl Barks publishes his Uncle Scrooge story The Seven Cities of Cibola.

=== October ===
- October: In the 16th issue of Mad Magazine, Harvey Kurtzman and Will Elder's short satirical comic Restaurant! is first printed.
- October 3: Il Grande Blek by Giovanni Sinchetto, Dario Guzzon and Pietro Sartoris, also known as trio EsseGesse, makes its debut.
- October 16: The first issue of the British comics magazine Playhour is published. It will run until 15 August 1987.
- October 18: Mort Walker and Dik Browne's Hi and Lois makes its debut.
- October: Brad Anderson's Marmaduke makes its debut.
- Matt Murphy and Rex Maxon's Turok makes his debut. In 1956 the character will receive his own comic book series.
- In Bonne soirée, supplement to Le libre Belgique, Les Bijoux volés, by Goscinny and Uderzo, first adventure of the reporter-detective Luc Junior.
- Journey into Mystery (1952 series) #18 - Atlas Comics

=== November ===
- November: The 17th issue of Mad Magazine is released. Inside, Harvey Kurtzman, Will Elder and Bernard Krigstein's parody of Bringing Up Father is first printed.
- November 17: Albert Weinberg's Dan Cooper makes its debut.
- November 25: Mitacq's La Patrouille des Castors makes its debut.
- The Haunt of Fear, with issue #28 (November/December cover date), canceled by EC Comics.
- Journey into Mystery (1952 series) #19 - Atlas Comics

=== December ===
- December 22: Hergé's Tintin story The Calculus Affair is prepublished in Tintin. Halfway the story the obnoxious neighbour Jolyon Wagg makes his debut, as does the running gag of Cutts the Butcher .
- December 30: in Le journal de Tintin, Dan Cooper, by Albert Weinberg, makes his debut.
- Kodansha publishes Nakayoshi.
- The Vault of Horror, with issue #40 (December 1954/January 1955 cover date), canceled by EC Comics.
- Chamber of Chills, with issue #26, canceled by Harvey Comics.
- The Mysterious Stone Ray by Carl Barks, on Uncle Scrooge.
- Journey into Mystery (1952 series) #20 - Atlas Comics

=== Specific date unknown ===
- The first episode of Roland Davies' Roddy the Road Scout is published.
- In the Kapitein Rob story De Speurtocht van de Vrijheid by Pieter J. Kuhn Kapitein Rob marries Paula. Due to negative reception, the character was later made single again.

== Births ==
=== February ===
- February 24: Greg LaRocque, American comic book artist (The Flash, Legion of Super-Heroes, Spider-Man).

=== April ===
- April 22: David A. Trampier, American illustrator and comics artist (Wormy), (d. 2014).

=== June ===
- June 9: George Pérez, American comic book artist (The Avengers, Crisis on Infinite Earths, Teen Titans) and writer, (d. 2022).
- June 28: Benoît Sokal, Belgian comics artist (Inspector Canardo), (d. 2021).

=== July ===
- July 4: Ota, Brazilian comics writer, comics artist, cartoonist and publisher (Os Birutas, worked for the Brazilian edition of Mad Magazine), (d. 2021).

=== September ===
- September 19: Garry Leach, British comic book artist (Judge Dredd, Tharg's Future Shocks, Dan Dare), (d. 2022).

=== November ===
- November 2: Brian Augustyn, American comic book editor and writer (The Flash, Gotham by Gaslight, Imperial Guard), (d. 2022).

== Deaths ==
=== January ===
- January 4: Jimmy McMenamy (a.k.a. Jimmy Mack), American comics artist (Dotty Dripple, Good Joe, assisted on Dinky Dinkerton, Secret Agent 6 7/8, continued Big Sister), dies at age 41.
- January 7:
  - Bruno Angoletta, Italian illustrator and comics artist (Marmittone, Calogero Sorbara, Centerbe Ermete), dies at age 64.
  - Albertine Randall, a.k.a. Albertine Randall Wheelan, American illustrator and comics artist (The Dumbunnies), dies at age 90.

=== February ===
- February 21: Roland Coe, American comics artist (Crosstown Cartoons, His Nibs), dies at age 46.

=== May ===
- May 5: Lou Hanlon, American comic artist (G-Man), dies at age 71.

=== July ===
- July 16: Attilio Mussino, Italian comics artist and illustrator (Bilbolbul, Gian Saetta, Schizzo, Dorotea and Salomone), dies at age 76.

=== August ===
- August 3: Harry S. Hall, Canadian comics artist (Men of the Mounted, News 'n' Nonsense (A.K.A. Sez Melinda)), dies at age 60 or 61.
- Specific date unknown: Lou Ferstadt, Ukrainian-American muralist painter, comics artist (Bouncer) and comics studio founder (Ferstadt Studios), dies at age 53.

=== September ===
- September 7: Bud Fisher, American comics artist (Mutt and Jeff), dies at age 69.
- September 27: Hy Mayer, German-American political cartoonist, comic artist and animator (made prototypical comics), dies at age 86.

=== October ===
- October 22: George McManus, American comics artist (Bringing Up Father), dies at age 70.

== First issues by title ==
=== Archie Comics ===
- Archie Giant Series

=== Atlas Comics ===
- Arrowhead
- Battle Ground
- Girl's Life
- Jungle Action
- Jungle Tales
- Marines in Battle
- Navy Action
- Outlaw Fighters
- Outlaw Kid
- Police Action
- The Ringo Kid Western
- Riot
- Rugged Action
- Spy Thrillers
- Western Kid (December)
- Western Outlaws
- Western Thrillers
- Wild

=== Hulton Press ===
- Swift

=== National Comics ===
- Superman's Pal Jimmy Olsen (October)
- Our Fighting Forces (October)

=== Toby Press ===
- With the Marines on the Battlefronts of the World

== Initial appearances by character name ==
=== Atlas Comics ===
- Gorilla-Man (Ken Hale) in Men's Adventures #26 (March)
- Gorilla-Man (Arthur Nagan) in Mystery Tales #21 (September)
- Jann of the Jungle in Jungle Tales #1 (September)
- M-11 in Menace #11 (May)
- Outlaw Kid in The Outlaw Kid #1 (September)
- Ringo Kid in The Ringo Kid Western #1 (August)
- Western Kid in The Western Kid #1 (November)

=== Dell Comics ===
- Turok in Four Color Comics #596 (October/November)

=== Harvey Comics ===
- Wendy the Good Little Witch in Casper the Friendly Ghost #20 (May)

=== L. Miller & Son ===
- Marvelman in Marvelman #25 (3 February)

=== National Comics ===
- Angle Man in Wonder Woman #70 (November), created by Robert Kanigher and Harry G. Peter – DC Comics
- Crimesmith in World's Finest Comics #68 (January),
- Halk Kar in Superman #80 (February), created by Otto Binder and Al Plastino – DC Comics
- Janu the Jungle Boy in Action Comics #191 (April)
- Mirror Man in Detective Comics #213 (November), created by Bill Finger and Sheldon Moldoff – DC Comics
- Mysto in Detective Comics #203 (January), created by George Kashdan and Leonard Starr – DC Comics
- Space Cabbie in Mystery in Space #21 (August)

=== Prize Comics ===
- Fighting American in Fighting American #1 (April/May)

=== Newspaper strips ===
- Charlotte Braun in Peanuts (November 30)
- Pig-Pen in Peanuts (July 13)

=== Italy ===
- Tarzanetto, parody of Tarzan, by Roberto Terenchi (Edizioni Dardo)
- Geppo the good-hearted devil (December), created by Giulio Chierchini (Bianconi).
