= Psycho-Pirate =

- The Roger Hayden incarnation of Psycho-Pirate as depicted in Detective Comics #1051 (February 2022). Art by Fernando Blanco.

Publication information
- Publisher: DC Comics
- First appearance: Charles Halstead: All-Star Comics #23 (December 1944); Roger Hayden: Showcase #56 (June 1965)
- Created by: Charles Halstead: Gardner Fox; Joe Gallagher; Roger Hayden: Gardner Fox; Murphy Anderson

In-story information
- Alter ego: Charles Halstead; Roger Hayden
- Team affiliations: Roger Hayden: Secret Society of Super Villains; Black Lantern Corps
- Abilities: Roger Hayden: Emotional psychic vampirism; Control over emotions through use of the Medusa Mask; Ability to create life-like duplicates; Regeneration through the Medusa Mask

The Psycho-Pirate is the name of two supervillains appearing in American comic books published by DC Comics.

Bob Frazer portrayed the character for his live action debut during The CW's 2018 Arrowverse crossover "Elseworlds". Additionally, Armin Shimerman and Geoffrey Arend have voiced Psycho-Pirate in animation.

== Publication history ==
The Charles Halstead incarnation of Psycho-Pirate first appeared in All-Star Comics #23 (December 1944), and was created by Gardner Fox and Joe Gallagher.

The Roger Hayden incarnation of Psycho-Pirate first appeared in Showcase #56 (June 1965), and was created by Gardner Fox and Murphy Anderson.

== Fictional character biography ==
=== Charles Halstead ===
Charles Halstead is a linotyper for the Daily Courier who became jealous of his boss's success; later, he becomes a criminal mastermind under the name Psycho-Pirate. He plans crimes based on emotions, hoping to ruin his boss. A long-time employee, Halstead was a friend and favorite of publisher Rex Morgan. Secretly, however, Halstead was frustrated with his lack of advancement at the paper and, at some point, snapped. He resolved to take what he had never been able to earn. His first target was the newspaper itself. He began to stage a series of crimes based on emotions, cluing the Courier with leads to his crimes.

Halstead pens a letter to the Courier, challenging the Justice Society to stop a new wave of crimes based on a variety of emotions. For example, he engendered fear into the inhabitants of a city where he threatened to unleash a deadly plague until his plan was halted by Doctor Mid-Nite. Each JSAer was given an emotion and a task to solve. With the JSA dispersed and only the Atom to guard Halstead, the Psycho-Pirate began a campaign to demoralize the publisher with constant news of despair: business failure, divorce, foreclosure — a series of lies designed to crush the spirit of his employer. To remove the Atom, he convinced the hero that the JSA had been captured and sent the Atom to rescue them. The Atom discovered the ruse and defeated the criminal's henchmen disguised as JSAers. In doing so, the Atom discovered the true identity of the Psycho-Pirate, who shot him to preserve his secrecy. Wounded, the Atom made it to the Courier just as the JSA returned and exposed Halstead as Psycho-Pirate. Halstead was subsequently sentenced to a lengthy prison term after the Justice Society of America captured and put him in jail. Halstead continued to research the mysticism of emotions until his death sometime in the 1960s.

=== Roger Hayden ===
The first appearance of the second Psycho-Pirate as he is confronted by Doctor Fate and Hourman. Cover to Showcase #56. Art by Murphy Anderson.

Roger Hayden is a jailed gangster who is a cellmate to Halstead on the parallel universe of Earth-Two. Halstead's dying wish, to have a legacy, prompts him to tell Hayden of a secret which he has divined in his jail years: the existence of the Medusa Masks. These golden masks bestow upon the wearer the power to project emotions onto others. Hayden finds these masks, merges them into a single faceplate and uses its powers to become a supervillain.

In the Crisis on Infinite Earths limited series, Hayden is abducted by the Anti-Monitor. In exchange for an entire world and all of its inhabitants' emotions to play with, Psycho-Pirate becomes an accomplice to the Anti-Monitor, manipulating a captive Barry Allen. The Flash's powers are briefly enhanced so that Hayden can control the remaining three alternate Earths at the time (Earth-4, Earth-S, and Earth-X) so that their heroes are provoked into attacking teams sent to rescue them. Psycho-Pirate's use of his powers on this scale causes him to "burn out" so that he cannot use his powers again afterward. Although the Anti-Monitor constantly belittles the Psycho-Pirate, he keeps him around in case his emotion-manipulating abilities prove useful later on and because he lacks the time to find or create someone else with the same powers. After the resolution of the Crisis, when the multiverse is destroyed, Psycho-Pirate is one of the few individuals to remember the original multiverse.

Following the events of Crisis on Infinite Earths, Hayden escapes Arkham Asylum and encounters a renegade Fifth Dimension Thunderbolt genie who has merged with private investigator Jonni Thunder. The two bedevil the members of Infinity, Inc. in a bid to destroy Jonni's mind so that Thunderbolt can seize total control over her body. During the arc, it is shown that Thunderbolt repeatedly shocked Psycho-Pirate to cure his madness. However, the electroshock has the side effect of making Psycho-Pirate lose all memories of the Crisis and the existence of parallel Earths.

==== Post-Crisis ====
Hayden shows up again in Grant Morrison's run on Animal Man, imprisoned in Arkham Asylum. The effects of the electroshocks given to him by Thunderbolt have worn off and Hayden's memories of the Crisis and of the prior existence of multiple Earths are restored. Psycho-Pirate ends up releasing several people who were killed during the Crisis back into the world, although many of them come to realize they are fictional characters. After an intervention by Animal Man, Hayden, seemingly happy, fades away into nothingness.

Psycho-Pirate does not appear again until the 1995 storyline Underworld Unleashed, where he sells his soul to the demon Neron in exchange for more power. He now sports a black leather jacket and has the metal of his mask as an eyepatch that replaces half of his brain.

==== Infinite Crisis ====
Psycho-Pirate's death at the hands of Black Adam. Art by Phil Jimenez.

During the Infinite Crisis event, Psycho-Pirate is recruited by Alexander Luthor Jr. and uses his powers to torment Power Girl and force Black Adam to power Luthor's dimensional "tuning fork" machine. When Luthor's captives are freed, Adam kills Psycho-Pirate by forcing the Medusa Mask through his head.

In the Blackest Night storyline, Psycho-Pirate is resurrected as a Black Lantern. He attacks Smallville, using his powers to manipulate the inhabitants and sway Conner Kent into attacking Superman. Psycho-Pirate murders several Smallville citizens after using his powers to enhance their emotions, as Black Lanterns enjoy attacking the emotionally overwrought. Conner attacks Superman and aids the Black Lantern Superman from Earth 2; however, the effect of the mask wears off and Conner regains his senses. Clark and Conner decide to separate, with Conner confronting Psycho-Pirate. Conner manages to withstand his emotional manipulation attempts and steals the Medusa Mask. Using the artifact, Conner inspires hope, will, and compassion, ending the riots in Smallville. Conner uses the Medusa Mask on the Earth-2 Superman and Psycho-Pirate, killing them by causing their black rings to malfunction.

==== The New 52 ====
In September 2011, The New 52 rebooted DC's continuity. In this new timeline, a new depiction of Psycho-Pirate first appears in Superboy (vol. 6) #23 as a member of the Twenty, a group of people who are infected by Brainiac with a psionic virus and gained psionic abilities. He was captured by the H.I.V.E. Queen, another member of the Twenty who had become a zealous devotee of Brainiac. Psycho-Pirate managed to escape and sought out the Medusa Mask, an artifact that he believed would protect him against other people with psychic powers.

== Powers and abilities ==
Charles Halstead has no superhuman powers; however, he is a brilliant criminal mind with an excellent grasp of human psychology and emotions.

With the Medusa Mask, Roger Hayden is able to project emotions onto other people. Often it seems to intensify emotions that a person already feels, no matter how small. Hayden later shows the power to manifest any DC Multiverse characters that had been destroyed during the Crisis on Infinite Earths or any living character, period. The Psycho-Pirate has also shown some sort of regeneration of body control, as he is able to reform after being crushed by Power Girl, and also disguises himself as a Legion flight ring.

During his 1990s revamp, the Psycho-Pirate was a psychic vampire, able to drain emotions from other people.

Following The New 52 reboot, Roger Hayden is depicted as a psychic who specializes in telepathically manipulating other people's emotions. Examples include: calming a person to make them more reasonable or amplifying negative emotions such as fear or anger to the point of sending people into a murderous frenzy. While wearing the Medusa Mask, Hayden's emotion-manipulating powers were increased to the point where he could control all of Metropolis without straining himself. The mask also provided him with a number of other abilities, including shielding his mind against intrusion from other telepaths, levitation, draining other psi-powered individuals of their mental energies to increase his own, projecting psionic constructs in the form of giant orange snakes which he uses to attack enemies, forming a psychic link with another person, projecting his mind over tremendous distances (essentially granting him omnipresence), deflecting psionic attacks, projecting bolts of psionic energy and creating illusions.

== Other versions ==
- An alternate universe version of Roger Hayden / Psycho-Pirate from the Flashpoint timeline appears in Flashpoint Beyond, where he is killed by the Joker.
- An alternate universe version of Charles Halstead / Psycho-Pirate appears in JSA: The Golden Age as a member of the Injustice Society.

== In other media ==
=== Television ===
- The Roger Hayden incarnation of Psycho-Pirate makes non-speaking cameo appearances in Justice League Unlimited as a member of Gorilla Grodd's Secret Society.
- The Roger Hayden incarnation of Psycho-Pirate appears in Batman: The Brave and the Bold, voiced by Armin Shimerman.
- The Roger Hayden incarnation of Psycho-Pirate appears in the Arrowverse crossover "Elseworlds", portrayed by Bob Frazer.
- The Psycho-Pirate, via Cecile Horton, appears The Flash episode "Masquerade", portrayed by Danielle Nicolet.

=== Film ===
The Charles Halstead incarnation of Psycho-Pirate appears films set in the Tomorrowverse, voiced by Geoffrey Arend. An alternate universe incarnation of Halstead named the Advisor appears in Justice Society: World War II, while the main universe incarnation appears in Justice League: Crisis on Infinite Earths.

=== Video games ===
- The Roger Hayden incarnation of Psycho-Pirate and the Medusa Mask appear in Scribblenauts Unmasked: A DC Comics Adventure.
- The Roger Hayden incarnation of Psycho-Pirate appears as a playable character in Lego DC Super-Villains, voiced again by Armin Shimerman. This version is a member of the Legion of Doom.

=== Miscellaneous ===
- The Roger Hayden incarnation of Psycho-Pirate appears in Justice League Adventures #20. This version is a former psychiatrist who was suspended for malpractice and lost his wife and son during an alien attack in Metropolis.
- The Roger Hayden incarnation of Psycho-Pirate appears in a special one-shot Young Justice issue published for Free Comic Book Day.
