= 1962 in comics =

Notable events of 1962 in comics. Starting January, most companies raise their comics from 10 to 12 cents.

== Publications ==
=== January ===
- January 3: Suat Yalaz's Karaoğlan makes its debut.
- January 15: René Goscinny and Jean Tabary's Iznogoud makes its debut. Originally the caliph Haroun El Poussah is the title character, but Iznogoud soon becomes so popular that the series is renamed after him.
- January 20: The first issue of the British magazine Look and Learn is published. It will run until 1982.
- Amazing Adult Fantasy (1961 series) #8 – Marvel Comics
- Fantastic Four (1961 series) #2 - Marvel Comics
  - First appearance of the Skrulls.
- Journey into Mystery (1952 series) #76 - Marvel Comics
- Kid Colt: Outlaw (1948 series) #102 - Marvel Comics
- Strange Tales (1951 series) #92 - Marvel Comics
- Tales of Suspense (1959 series) #25 - Marvel Comics
- Tales to Astonish (1959 series) #27 - Marvel Comics
  - First appearance of Hank Pym.

=== February ===
- February 6: In Le journal de Tintin, the first episode of the Michel Vaillant adventure Les Casse-cou, by Jean Graton starts its serialisation.
- February 8: Jean Roba's children's adventure comic series La Ribambelle debuts in Spirou.
- Aquaman #1 — DC Comics
- Amazing Adult Fantasy (1961 series) #9 - Marvel Comics
- Help! vol. 2, #1 — Warren Publishing
- Journey into Mystery (1952 series) #77 - Marvel Comics
- Rawhide Kid (1955 series) #26 - Marvel Comics
- Strange Tales (1951 series) #93 - Marvel Comics
- Tales of Suspense (1959 series) #26 - Marvel Comics
- Tales to Astonish (1959 series) #28 - Marvel Comics

=== March ===
- March 1: The first episode of René Goscinny and Jean Tabary's Valentin Le Vagabond is published in Pilote. The series will run until 1973.
- March 22: In Pilote, the first chapter of Asterix the Gladiator, by Goscinny and Uderzo is prepublished. The story marks the debut of the pirates, whose unlucky encounters with the gauls will become a running gag in each album.
- Amazing Adult Fantasy (1961 series) #10 - Marvel Comics
- Cave of Ali Baba, by Carl Barks, on Uncle Scrooge #37 - Dell Comics.
- Fantastic Four (1961 series) #3 - Marvel Comics
- Journey into Mystery (1952 series) #78 - Marvel Comics
- Kid Colt: Outlaw (1948 series) #103 - Marvel Comics
- Strange Tales (1951 series) #94 - Marvel Comics
- Tales of Suspense (1959 series) #27 - Marvel Comics
- Tales to Astonish (1959 series) #29 - Marvel Comics
- The Italian editor Luciano Secchi debuts as an author with the western series Maschera nera (Black mask), designed by Paolo Piffarerio and published by Editoriale Corno. For the occasion, the writer takes the pen name Max Bunker.

=== April ===
- April 2: In the French magazine V-Magazine, the character Barbarella by Jean-Claude Forest makes her debut.
- April 4: Australian comic artist Len Lawson (of The Lone Avenger fame), who'd already been jailed between 1954 and 1961 for rape and assault, is sentenced again for rape, murder and holding people at ransom, this time for life.
- April 13: Hugo Pratt's Fort Wheeling debuts in the Argentine review Misterix.
- The final issue of the American comics magazine The Funnies is published.
- Amazing Adult Fantasy (1961 series) #11 - Marvel Comics
- Journey into Mystery (1952 series) #79 - Marvel Comics
- Rawhide Kid (1955 series) #27 - Marvel Comics
- Strange Tales (1951 series) #95 - Marvel Comics
- Tales of Suspense (1959 series) #28 - Marvel Comics
- Tales to Astonish (1959 series) #30 - Marvel Comics

=== May ===
- May 10: In Spirou, the first chapter of the Lucky Luke story The Daltons in the Blizzard, by Goscinny and Morris is prepublished.
- May 25: New Zealand cartoonist and comic artist David Low is knighted.
- Amazing Adult Fantasy (1961 series) #12 - Marvel Comics
- Fantastic Four (1961 series) #4 - Marvel Comics
  - Reintroduction of Namor the Sub-Mariner into Marvel Comics continuity.
- The Incredible Hulk (1962 series) #1 - Marvel Comics
  - First appearance of the Hulk, Thunderbolt Ross, Betty Ross, and Rick Jones.
- Journey into Mystery (1952 series) #80 - Marvel Comics
- Kid Colt: Outlaw (1948 series) #104 - Marvel Comics
- The Lone Ranger (1948 series), with issue #145, cancelled by Dell Comics
- Strange Adventures #140, "The Strange Adventure That Really Happened," featuring DC Comics staff members Julius Schwartz and Sid Greene struggling to make writer Gardner Fox recall a story he has written that holds the key to saving the Earth from alien invasion.
- Strange Tales (1951 series) #96 - Marvel Comics
- Tales of Suspense (1959 series) #29 - Marvel Comics
- Tales to Astonish (1959 series) #31 - Marvel Comics

=== June ===
- June 21: Carmen Barbará's Mary Noticias is first published.
- Amazing Adult Fantasy (1961 series) #13 - Marvel Comics
- Rawhide Kid (1955 series) #28 - Marvel Comics
- Strange Tales (1951 series) #97 - Marvel Comics
- Tales of Suspense (1959 series) #30 - Marvel Comics
- Tales to Astonish (1959 series) #32 - Marvel Comics
- Uncle Scrooge (1953 series) #38 - Dell comics; "The Unsafe Safe" by Carl Barks
- The classic Little Archie story Caramel Has A Tale (issue #22), scripted by Bob Bolling, is published.

=== July ===
- July 20: Héctor Germán Oesterheld and Alberto Breccia's prologue story Ezra Winston el anticuario is first published and features the debut of Ezra Winston.
- The final episode of Don Freeman and Jack Monk's Buck Ryan is published.
- Amazing Adult Fantasy (1961 series) #14 - Marvel Comics
- Fantastic Four (1961 series) #5 - Marvel Comics
  - First appearance of Doctor Doom.
- The Incredible Hulk (1962 series) #2 - Marvel Comics
- Kid Colt: Outlaw (1948 series) #105 - Marvel Comics
- Strange Tales (1951 series) #98 - Marvel Comics
- Tales of Suspense (1959 series) #31 - Marvel Comics
- Tales to Astonish (1959 series) #33 - Marvel Comics
- With issue #131 (July/August cover date), Dell Comics cancels Tarzan.

=== August ===
- August 17: Héctor Germán Oesterheld and Alberto Breccia's Mort Cinder makes its debut.
- August 26: In the Disney magazine Topolino the first episode of Paperon de Paperoni visir di Papatoa by Rodolfo Cimino and Romano Scarpa is published.
- The final issue of Classics Illustrated Junior is published.
- Amazing Fantasy (1961 series) #15 renamed from Amazing Adult Fantasy - Marvel Comics
  - First appearance of Spider-Man.
- Journey into Mystery (1952 series) #83 - Marvel Comics
  - First appearance of Thor.
- Rawhide Kid (1955 series) #29 - Marvel Comics
- Strange Tales (1951 series) #99 - Marvel Comics
- Tales of Suspense (1959 series) #32 - Marvel Comics
- Tales to Astonish (1959 series) #34 - Marvel Comics

=== September ===
- September 5:
  - The first issue of the Flemish comics magazine Pats is published. It's a weekly children's supplement of the newspapers Het Nieuwsblad, De Standaard, Het Handelsblad, De Gentenaar and De Landwacht. It will run until 27 February 1974, after which it changes its name to the Patskrant.
  - Inside the first issue of Pats Willy Vandersteen's comics series Pats (1962-1977) makes its debut., as well as Gommaar Timmermans' long-running children's comic Fideel de Fluwelen Ridder.
- September 15: The final issue of the British comics magazine Film Fun is published, which merges with Buster.
- First issue of Gatto Felix (Edizioni Bianconi), a licensed version of Felix the cat, by Italian authors.
- Fantastic Four (1961 series) #6 - Marvel Comics
- The Incredible Hulk (1962 series) #3 - Marvel Comics
  - First appearance of the Ringmaster and the Circus of Crime.
- Journey into Mystery (1952 series) #84 - Marvel Comics
  - First appearance of Jane Foster.
- Kid Colt: Outlaw (1948 series) #106 - Marvel Comics
- Strange Tales (1951 series) #100 - Marvel Comics
- Strange Tales Annual (1962 series) #1 - Marvel Comics
- Tales of Suspense (1959 series) #33 - Marvel Comics
- Tales to Astonish (1959 series) #35 - Marvel Comics
  - First appearance of Hank Pym as Ant-Man.

=== October ===
- October 4: The final episode of Jacques Laudy's Hassan et Kaddour runs in Tintin.
- October 6: The first issue of the British comics magazine Valiant is published. It will run until 16 October 1976.
- Fantastic Four (1961 series) #7 - Marvel Comics
- Journey into Mystery (1952 series) #85 - Marvel Comics
  - First appearance of Loki, Balder, Sif, Odin, and Asgard.
- Little Annie Fanny by Harvey Kurtzman and Will Elder makes its debut in Playboy.
- Rawhide Kid (1955 series) #30 - Marvel Comics
- Strange Tales (1951 series) #101 - Marvel Comics
  - First solo Human Torch (Johnny Storm) feature.
- Tales of Suspense (1959 series) #34 - Marvel Comics
- Tales to Astonish (1959 series) #36 - Marvel Comics
- In Italy, the first issue of Collana eroica, (Italian translation of the Fleetway war comics) is published by Editoriale Dardo.
- On Maschera nera (Editoriale Corno), Atomik makes his debut (texts by Luciano Secchi, drawings by Paolo Piffarerio); he is one of the few superheroes of Italian production.

=== November ===
- November 1: In Il re del terrore (King of terror), the first episode of Angela and Luciana Giussani's Diabolik is published.
- November 1: In Spirou, the first chapter of the Lucky Luke story The Wagon Train by Goscinny and Morris is prepublished.
- November 22: The Suske en Wiske story Het Rijmende Paard by Willy Vandersteen is first published in the newspapers. Halfway the story the series' nemesis Krimson makes his debut.
- Fantastic Four (1961 series) #8 - Marvel Comics
  - First appearance of Puppet Master.
- The Incredible Hulk (1962 series) #4 - Marvel Comics
- Journey into Mystery (1952 series) #86 - Marvel Comics
  - First appearance of Zarrko the Tomorrow Man.
- Kid Colt: Outlaw (1948 series) #107 - Marvel Comics
- Strange Tales (1951 series) #102 - Marvel Comics
  - First appearance of the Wizard.
- Tales of Suspense (1959 series) #35 - Marvel Comics
- Tales to Astonish (1959 series) #37 - Marvel Comics
- Two-Gun Kid (1948 series) #60 - Marvel Comics
- With issue #132, Gold Key Comics begins publishing Tarzan, which it acquired from Dell Comics.

=== December ===
- December 10: Willy Vandersteen's western comics series Karl May, based on the novels by Karl May, is launched and will run until 1977.
- December 20: The first episode of Hubuc and Jacques Devos' Victor Sébastopol is published in Spirou.
- December 29: The final episode of Al Capp and Bob Lubbers 's Long Sam is published.
- Fantastic Four (1961 series) #9 - Marvel Comics
- Journey into Mystery (1952 series) #87 - Marvel Comics
- Rawhide Kid (1955 series) #31 - Marvel Comics
- Strange Tales (1951 series) #103 - Marvel Comics
- Tales of Suspense (1959 series) #36 - Marvel Comics
- Tales to Astonish (1959 series) #38 - Marvel Comics
  - First appearance of Egghead.

=== Specific date unknown ===
- Gene Deitch's Maly Svet (Small World) runs in Kvety, the official weekly of the Czech Communist Party for 12 episodes, after which it is discontinued because of its satire of communism.
- David Sutherland is assigned to continue the popular gag comic The Bash Street Kids in The Beano. He will draw the series from 1962 until his death in early 2023.
- In the Argentina magazine Misterix, the western series Garret, el montaraz by Arturo del Castillo and Ray Collins, makes its debut.

== Births ==
=== February ===
- February 20: Dwayne McDuffie, American comic book writer (Milestone Media, Marvel Comics, DC Comics), (d. 2011).

=== March ===
- March 21: Mark Waid, American comic book writer (DC Comics, Marvel Comics).

=== October ===
- October 31: Don Asmussen, American comics artist (The San Francisco Strip, Bad Reporter, Super Average Joe), (d. 2021).

=== November ===
- November 16: Darwyn Cooke, Canadian animator and comics artist (DC Comics), (d. 2016).

== Deaths ==
=== January ===
- January 13: Ernie Kovacs, American comedian and comics writer (Mad), dies at age 42 in a car accident.
- January 22: Jack Patton, American comics artist (Restless Age, Dolly Burns, Spencer Easley), dies at age 61.

=== February ===
- February 12: Ding Darling, American cartoonist and comics artist (Taking the Day's Work Home to Be Free From Interruptions, We Could Live Just as Cheaply as Our Fathers, The Great American Sucker, The Musical Career of Tillie Clapsaddle), dies at age 85.
- February 14: James Crighton, Scottish comics artist (Korky the Cat), dies at age 70.

=== March ===
- March 2: J.F. Horrabin, British comics artist (Japhet and Happy, Dot and Carrie), cartoonist and writer, dies at age 77.
- March 5: Cornelis Veth, Dutch painter, cartoonist, journalist, writer and illustrator, dies at age 82.

=== April ===
- April 18: Don Wootton, American comics artist (Seeing Stars), commits suicide at age 66.
- April 21:
  - Bob McCay, American comics artist (continued his father's Little Nemo in Slumberland), dies at age 65.
  - Bob Wickersham, American animator and comics artist (American Comics Group (ACG), Timely Comics, Real Screen Comics and Ned Pines Comics), dies at age 50.
- April 25: Billy Cam, American comics artist (Camouflages), dies at age 70.
- April 26: Carlos Neve, Mexican comic artist (Segundo I, Rey de Moscabia, Rocambole), dies at age 71–72.

=== May ===
- May 12: Dick Calkins, American comics artist (Buck Rogers), dies at age 67.
- May 22: John H. Striebel, American comics artist (Dixie Dugan), dies at age 79.
- May 24: Vic Forsythe, American comics artist (Joe Jinks, Divot Diggers), dies at age 76.

=== June ===
- June 2: Jules Luyckx, A.K.A. Julux, Belgian animator and comic artist (Pimmeke, Jantje Pap, Tijl Uilenspiegel), dies at age 41 or 42 in an accident.
- June 21: Tom Webster, British cartoonist (drew sports cartoons), dies at age 76.

=== August ===
- August 5: John Willie, British photographer and comics artist (Sweet Gwendoline), dies at age 59.
- August 7: Mikhail Cheremnykh, Russian caricaturist, painter, illustrator, poster artist and comics artist (Soviet propaganda comics), dies at age 71.

=== September ===
- September 4: Fran Striker, American radio and comics writer (The Lone Ranger, The Green Hornet), dies at age 59 in a car accident.
- September 17: Harry L. Parkhurst, American illustrator and comics artist (Murder for Exercise, Dear Little Dude), dies at age 86.
- September 26: George Carlson (Jingle Jangle Comics), American comics artist, dies at age 84 or 85.
- September 28: Bernardo Marques, Portuguese painter and comics artist, dies at age 64.

=== October ===
- October 26: Georges Sogny, French illustrator and comic artist (continued Don Winslow of the Navy in Le Journal de Mickey), dies at age 66.
- Specific date unknown: Forest A. McGinn, American comics artist (made a celebrity comic about Joe Martin, a Hollywood orang-utan), dies at age 69.

=== November ===
- November 2: Kurt Ludwig Schmidt, aka Becker-Kasch, German comics artist (Tim und Tobby, Mischa im Weltraum, Die Löwe Adolar, Rolf Kauka comics), dies at age 53.
- November 4: Guillermo Cifré, Spanish comics artist (Don Furcio, Cucufato Pi, Reporter Tribulete), dies at age 39.
- November 9: Emile Brumsteede, Dutch film director and comics artist (Dannie ben ik), dies at age 51.
- November 17: Albéric Bourgeois, Canadian comics artist (Les Aventures de Timothée, Les Aventures de Toinon, Les Fables du Parc Lafontaine, continued Le Père Ladébauche), dies at age 86.
- November 29: Karl Staudinger, Austrian graphic artist, illustrator and art teacher (made occasional comics), dies at age 88.

=== December ===
- December 12: David Bueno de Mesquita, Dutch graphic artist, illustrator and comics artist (De Geschiedenis van Gulzigen Tobias, Billie Ritchie en Zijn Ezel), dies at age 73.

=== Specific date unknown ===
- Arch Dale, Scottish-Canadian cartoonist and comics artist (The Doo-Dads), dies at age 79 or 80.
- Guido Moroni-Celsi, Italian comics artist (Bonifazio, I Misteri della Giungla Nera, La Conquista di Mompracem), dies at age 77.
- Hal Rasmusson, American illustrator and comics artist (Aggie Mack), dies at age 61 or 62.
- Robert Q. Sale, American comics artist (worked for Lev Gleason, Funnies Inc., D.S. Publishing & Hillman, DC Comics, Novelty Comics, Marvel Comics/Atlas Comics), dies at age 37 or 38.
- H.M. Talintyre, British comics artist (Uncle Oojah, Jack and Jill), dies at age 68 or 69.

== First issues by title ==
Help! (vol. 2) — Warren Publishing

Release: February. Editor: Harvey Kurtzman

The Incredible Hulk (Marvel Comics)

Release: May. Writer: Stan Lee. Artist: Jack Kirby

Pep (The Netherlands)

Release: October 6. Note: Runs until 26 September 1975, after which it merges with Sjors to become Eppo.

== Initial appearances by character name ==
=== Marvel Comics ===
- Ant-Man in Tales to Astonish #35 (Sept.)
- Aunt May in Amazing Fantasy #15 (Aug.)
- Balder in Journey into Mystery #85 (Oct.)
- Betty Ross in The Incredible Hulk #1 (May)
- Doctor Doom in Fantastic Four #5 (July)
- Egghead in Tales to Astonish #38 (Dec.)
- Hank Pym in Tales to Astonish #27 (Jan.)
- Hulk in The Incredible Hulk #1 (May)
- Loki in Journey into Mystery #85 (Oct.)
- Odin in Journey into Mystery #85 (Oct.)
- Puppet Master in Fantastic Four #8 (Nov.)
- Rick Jones in The Incredible Hulk #1 (May)
- Sif in Journey into Mystery #85 (Oct.)
- Spider-Man in Amazing Fantasy #15 (Aug.)
- Skrulls in Fantastic Four #2 (Jan.)
- Thor in Journey into Mystery #83 (Aug.)
- Thunderbolt Ross in The Incredible Hulk #1 (May)
- Uncle Ben in Amazing Fantasy #15 (Aug.)
- Wizard in Strange Tales #102 (Nov.)
- Zarrko the Tomorrow Man in Journey into Mystery #86 (Nov.)

=== DC Comics ===
- Abra Kadabra, in The Flash #128 (May)
- Chameleon Chief, in Superman's Pal, Jimmy Olsen #63 (September)
- Chemo, in Showcase #39 (July)
- Chronos, in Atom #7 (November)
- Doctor Light (Arthur Light), in Justice League of America #12 (June)
- Felix Faust, in Justice League of America #10 (March)
- Floronic Man, in Atom #1 (July)
- Matter-Eater Lad, in Adventure Comics #303 (December)
- Metal Men, in Showcase #37 (March)
- Storm Boy, in Adventure Comics #301 (October)
- Ultra Boy, in Superboy #98 (July)
- Will Magnus, in Showcase #37 (March)

=== Other publishers ===
- Wonder Wart-Hog, in Bachannal (Spring)
- Whitewater Duck, in Log Jockey by Carl Barks (Disney)
- Diabolik, by the Giussani sisters, in King of terror (Astorina, November)
- Inspector Ginko, Diabolik's antagonist, in King of terror (Astorina, November)
