= Claude Lacroix =

French screenwriter and comic book author (1944–2021)

- Born: 6 January 1944; Amiens, France
- Died: 2 March 2021; Saint-Mandé, France
- Occupations: Comic Book Author; Screenwriter

Claude Lacroix (1944 – 2 March 2021) was a French comic book author and screenwriter.

== Biography ==
Lacroix's first comics were published in L'Os à moelle in 1964, and subsequently in Candide, Arts et Loisirs, Elle, Plexus, Hara-Kiri, La Vie financière, 60 Millions de consommateurs, and others.

As a cartoonist and writer, Lacroix published comics such as Les Pieds Nickelés in newspapers like Lisette. He also contributed to Jeux et Stratégie, Le Journal de Mickey, Le Point, Science & Vie, etc.

Claude Lacroix died of complications from a brain degeneration on 2 March 2021 at the age of 77.

== Works ==
- Les Aventures des Gammas (1975–1976)
- Yann le migrateur (1978–1984)
- L'homme au chapeau mou (1979–1982)
- Fariboles sidérales (1979)
- Le Cycle de Cyann(1993–2014)
- Des Monuments & des Hommes (2006)
