= 1956 in comics =

Notable events of 1956 in comics.

== Events and publications ==
=== January ===
- January 9: In Charles M. Schulz' Peanuts Snoopy starts walking on his hind legs.
- January 21: The first issue of the British comics magazine The Beezer comes out. It will be syndicated until 21 August 1993.
- January 26: The Uncle Scrooge story Land Beneath the Ground!, by Carl Barks is first printed, alongside Barks' Three Un-Ducks in Walt Disney's comics and stories.

=== February ===
- Romano Scarpa, already appreciated as cartoonist, begins his career as Disney writer with Shellfish Motives (Paperino e i gamberi in salmì).
- February 2:
  - In Carl Barks' Uncle Scrooge story The Second-Richest Duck Flintheart Glomgold makes his debut.
  - In Spirou the Lucky Luke story Rails on the prairie by René Goscinny and Morris is concluded. This marks the first time Luke sings his signature song: I'm a poor lonesome cowboy.
- February 18: The first issue of the British comics magazine Express Weekly comes out and will run until 1960.
- The final issue of the Belgian children's magazine Bimbo is published.
- In Walt Disney’s comics and stories, the story Secret resolutions by Carl Barks first appears in print.

=== March ===
- First issue of Showcase (DC comics)

=== April ===
- April 5: in Spirou, Alerte aux Pieds-Blues by Morris.
- April 14: The final episode of Gene Deitch's Terr'ble Thompson is published.
- In Charles M. Schulz' Peanuts Charlie Brown gets his kite stuck in a tree. This will become a running gag in the series.
- Cancellation of Apache Kid, with issue #19, Atlas.
- In Italy, the Donald Duck story Paperino Don Chisciotte (Duck Quixote), by Guido Martina (script) and Pier Lorenzo de Vita (drawings), a parody of Don Quixote set in modern California, with Donald Duck in the title role and Goofy as Sancho Panza is published. After Mickey Mouse’s Hell, it is the second retelling by Martina of a literary masterpiece with the Disney characters.
- In Albi d’oro, Witch Hazel makes her debut in the Italian Disney comics with Paperino e l’aspirapolvere fatato (The magic vacuum) by Carlo Chendi and Luciano Bottaro (Mondadori).
- First issue of Rama, l'apache by Andrea Lavezzolo and Virgilio Muzzi (Dardo).

=== May ===
- May 17: In Spirou, first chapter of Le Gorille a Mauvaise Mine by Andrè Franquin (retitled Le Gorille a Bonne Mine for the album edition.)
- World of fantasy, a bi-monthly publication debuts for Atlas Comics. Among the artists on the book are Werner Roth and Dick Ayers.
- In Valiant, Jacques Flash by Roger Lecareux and Pierre Le Guen, a journalist-detective with the power of invisibility, makes his début.

=== June ===
- June 10: In the Italian Disney magazine Topolino, in the story Topolino e la Grande Impresa di Lascia o t’Accoppo, by Guido Martina and Giovan Battista Carpi Mickey Mouse and Uncle Scrooge appear in the same story, which is an unusual situation, since characters from these two universes rarely overlap in Disney comic stories.

=== July ===
- In Detective Comics #233 Batwoman makes her debut.
- In the Uncle Scrooge story The Cat Box by Carl Barks, Little Helper makes his debut.

=== September ===
- September: In the 29th issue of Mad Magazine, a gap-toothed character who'd previously appeared as a tiny face on the cover of issue 21 in March, is given the name Alfred E. Neuman.
- September 1: In Het Parool, Piet Wijn's Frank, De Vliegende Hollander is cancelled after a year, to make place for the comeback of Pieter J. Kuhn's Kapitein Rob.
- September 10: David Wright and Peter Meriton's Carol Day makes its debut.
- September 20: Maurice Tillieux' Gil Jourdan makes its debut.
- Bill Ritchie's Baby Crockett makes its debut.
- September 21: The Nero story De IJzeren Kolonel by Marc Sleen is first published in the newspapers. Halfway the story the major antagonist of the series, Ricardo, makes his debut.

=== October ===
- October 13: in Spirou, Lucky Luke contre Joss Damon, by Morris and Goscinny.
- October 24: The first episode of Jules Feiffer's Sick, Sick, Sick (later retitled Feiffer) is published in The Village Voice.
- October 31: in Tintin, The Red Sea sharks, by Hergè.
- Showcase #4 (National Periodical Publications) — First appearance of a revamped Flash ushers in the Silver Age of Comic Books.

=== November ===
- November 1: The final issue of the Belgian comics magazine Risque-Tout is published.
- November 8: In Spirou, the first chapter of Le Nid des Marsupilamis, by André Franquin is serialized.
- November 18: Frank Giacoia's Johnny Reb and Billy Yank makes its debut. It will run until 24 May 1959.
- First issue of House of secrets (DC comics)

=== December ===
- December: Mad becomes a two-monthly black-and-white magazine with Al Feldstein and William M. Gaines as new chief editors and publishers.The magazine's enduring mascot Alfred E. Neuman appears on the cover for the first time, designed by Norman Mingo.
- Quality Comics ceases operations; many of the company's characters and title trademarks sold to National Periodical Publications, which chooses to keep only four series running: Blackhawk, G.I. Combat, Heart Throbs, and Robin Hood Tales.
- Cancellation of the American comics magazine Panic.
- The final issue of the Belgian comics magazine Heroïc Albums is published.
- In the Uncle Scrooge story Back To Long Ago!, by Carl Barks, 16th-century ancestors of Scrooge McDuck and Donald Duck are introduced. In the following years, this narrative device will be widely imitated by other Disney authors.

=== Specific date unknown ===
- Maurice Tillieux discontinues his detective series Félix in Héroïc-Albums.
- Oğuz Aral creates the Hayk Mammer comics series.
- Haaken Christensen discontinues Brumle.
- Turkish comics artist Ratip Tahir Burak is jailed after making an editorial cartoon warning against government censorship.
- The first episode of Charles M. Schulz' Young Pillars is published. It will run until 1965.
- In the French magazine Valiant, the little Indian Cha’pa and his friend, the imaginary animal Group-Group, by Jean Ollivier and Ramon Monzon, and the couple of amateur detectives Richard and Charlie, by Jean Tabary, make their debut.
- Fredric Wertham's Seduction of the Innocent and the United States Senate Subcommittee on Juvenile Delinquency hearings continue to negatively affect the comics marketplace. Ace Comics, Avon Comics, EC Comics, Key Publications (Aragon Magazines, Gillmor Magazines, Medal Comics, Media Publications, S. P. M. Publications, Stanmor Publications, and Timor Publications), Mainline Publications, Nedor Comics (Standard, Better, and Thrilling), and Quality Comics all cease publishing, though EC continues to publish Mad magazine (and Nedor is succeeded by the short-lived Pines Comics). The Canadian publisher Superior Publishers Limited also goes defunct.
- The Tintin story The Calculus Affair, by Hergé and the Blake & Mortimer album The Yellow "M" by Edgar P. Jacobs, previously published as serials, are released as comics albums.
- The album Lucky Luke contre Phil Defer by Morris is first released.
- The Spirou et Fantasio album Le Dictateur et le Champignon (The Dictator and the Mushroom) by André Franquin first appears in album form.
- The Little Archie series is launched, with Bob Bolling as main writer an artist. The series will run until 1983.

== Births ==
=== May ===
- May 1: Tim Sale, American comic book artist (Batman: The Long Halloween, Batman: Dark Victory, Superman for All Seasons), (d. 2022).

=== July ===
- July 11: Danny Shanahan, American cartoonist (worked for The New Yorker), (d. 2021).

=== September ===
- September 23: Peter David, American comic book writer (Spider-Man, The Incredible Hulk, X-Men).
- September 25: Kim Thompson, Danish-American comics editor, translator and publisher (vice-president of Fantagraphics Books), (d. 2013).

=== October ===
- October 21: Paul Levitz, American comic book writer (Adventure Comics, Legion of Super-Heroes).

=== Specific date unknown ===
- Bill Willingham, American comic writer and artist (Elementals, Fables, Green Lantern).

== Deaths ==
=== January ===
- January 3: Hugh Rankin, aka Doak, aka Quindaro, American illustrator and comics artist (continued Lord Longbow), dies at age 77.
- January 11: Charles Genty, French illustrator and comics artist, dies at age 69.
- January 13: Lyonel Feininger, German-American painter and comics artist (The Kin-der-Kids, Wee Willie Winkie's World), died, aged 84.
- January 22: Ward Greene, American comics writer (Rip Kirby, Scamp), dies at age 63 from a pulmonary edema.

=== March ===
- March 2: Walter Quermann, American comics artist (Hickory Hollow Folks), dies from a heart attack at age 58.
- March 4: Sidney Strube, British editorial cartoonist and comics artist (Little Man), dies at age 63.
- March 25: Giovanni Scolari, Italian comics artist (Saturno contro la Terra), dies at age 73.

=== May ===
- May 20: Max Beerbohm, British essayist, cartoonist and caricaturist, dies at age 83.

=== July ===
- July 21: Louis Raemaekers, Dutch cartoonist, comics artist and caricaturist (Flippie Flink), dies at age 86.

=== August ===
- August 12: Doc Winner, American comics artist (Tubby, Elmer), dies from cancer at age 71.
- August 23: Jos Speybrouck, Belgian graphic artist, illustrator and comics artist (Het Kerkelijk Jaar in Beeld, Levenslijnen), dies at age 65.
- August 24: A.D. Condo, American comics artist (The Outbursts of Everett True, Mr. Skygack, from Mars), dies at age 84.

=== September ===
- September 6: Alex Raymond, American comics artist (Flash Gordon, Jungle Jim, Rip Kirby, Secret Agent X-9), dies at age 46 in a car crash.
- September 19: Cecil Surry, American animator and comics artist (Disney comics, Tom & Jerry, Dell Comics), dies at age 49.

=== October ===
- October 6: Erwin Barta, Hungarian painter, illustrator and graphic artist (Hannibal the all round sportsman), dies at age 78.

=== December ===
- December 9: Uriel Birnbaum, Austrian illustrator, painter, poet, poster artist and comics artist, dies at age 62.
- December 31: Norm Rice, Australian comics artist (Powerman, Steele Carewe, Nick Carver of the Circus, continued Bluey and Curley), dies in a car accident.

=== Specific date unknown ===
- Freddie Crompton, British comic artist (drew celebrity comics based on Charlie Chaplin and Syd Chaplin, Marmy and His Ma, The Brownie Boys), dies at age 67 or 68.
- Gus Mager, American comics artist (Hawkshaw the Detective), dies at age 77 or 78.
- Zuni Maud, Polish journalist, cartoonist, puppeteer and comics artist, dies at age 64 or 65.
- Ralph Mayo, American comics artist and art director for AC Comics, dies at an unknown age.
- Austin Bowen Payne, British comics artist (Pip, Squeak and Wilfred), dies at age 79 or 80.

== Initial appearances by character name ==
- Capitan Trueno, created by Victor Mora and Miguel Ambrosio Zaragoza
- Ricardo, in The Adventures of Nero: De IJzeren Kolonel, created by Marc Steen – Standaard Uitgeverij (Belgium)
- Jolyon Wagg, in The Calculus Affair, created by Hergè – Casterman
- Gideon McDuck, in Topolino #132-133 (January), created by Romano Scarpa – Disney
- Timmy the timid ghost, in Timmy the Timid Ghost #3 (February), created by Al Fago – Charlton
- Fireman Farrell, in Showcase #1 (March), created by Arnold Drake and John Prentice – DC Comics
- Mr. Muscles, in Mr. Muscles #22 (March), created by Jerry Siegel – Charlton
- Nature Boy, in Nature Boy #3 (March), created by Jerry Siegel and John Buscema – Charlton
- Zaza the mystic, in Zaza the Mystic #10 (April), created by Joe Gill, Rocke Mastroserio, and Charles Nicholas – Charlton
- Chief Parker, in Adventure Comics #225 (June), created by Alvin Schwartz and Curt Swan – DC Comics
- Batwoman in Detective Comics #233 (July), created by Edmond Hamilton and Sheldon Moldoff – DC Comics
- Flintheart Glomgold, in Uncle Scrooge #15 (September), created by Carl Barks – Disney
- Little Helper, in Uncle Scrooge #15 (September), created by Carl Barks- Disney
- Flash in Showcase #4 (October), created by Robert Kanigher and Carmine Infantino – DC Comics
- Iris West Allen in Showcase #4 (October), created by Robert Kanigher, Carmine Infantino and Joe Kubert – DC Comics
- Topo in Adventure Comics #229 (October), created by Ramona Fradon – DC comics
- Yellow Claw in Yellow Claw #1 (October), created by Al Feldstein and Joe Maneely – Marvel
- Jimmy Woo in Yellow Claw #1 (October), created by Al Feldstein and Joe Maneely – Marvel
- Lew Moxon in Detective Comics #235 (November), created by Bill Finger and Sheldon Moldoff – DC Comics
- Malcolm McDuck and Pintail Duck, in Uncle Scrooge #16 (December), created by Carl Barks – Disney
- Turtle in Showcase #4 (October), created by Robert Kanigher and Carmine Infantino – DC Comics
