= Dotty Dripple =

American comic strip

- Author: Jeff Keate (1944 only); Buford Tune (1944–1974)
- Illustrator: Jim McMenamy (1944 only)
- Current status/schedule: Concluded
- Launch date: June 26, 1944
- End date: June 9, 1974
- Syndicate(s): Publishers Syndicate (1944–1967); Publishers-Hall Syndicate (1967–1974)
- Genre: humor

Dotty Dripple was an American gag-a-day comic strip, originally started by Jeff Keate & Jim McMenamy on June 26, 1944, but was taken over by Buford Tune on October 16, and continued for the next thirty years. The strip was distributed by Publishers Syndicate and also appeared in comic book form.

Dotty Dripple was a domestic comedy strip, heavily modeled on Blondie, and ended on June 9, 1974.
