= 1949 in comics =

Notable events of 1949 in comics.

== Events and publications ==
Publishers Star Publications, Toby Press, and Youthful make their debuts; conversely, Columbia Comics, Novelty Press, and Street & Smith Comics all fold.

=== January ===
- January 22: Peyo's gag comic Poussy is first published in Le Soir.
- Captain America Comics (1941 series) #70 - Timely Comics
- Human Torch Comics (1940 series) #34 - Timely Comics
- Joker Comics (1942 series) #35 - Timely Comics
- Jughead (1949 series) #1 - Archie Comics

=== February ===
- Lana (1948 series) #4 - Timely Comics
- Marvel Mystery Comics (1939 series) #90 - Timely Comics
- Sub-Mariner Comics (1941 series) #30 - Timely Comics
- Two-Gun Kid (1948 series) #6 - Timely Comics

=== March ===
- Captain America Comics (1941 series) #71 - Timely Comics
- Human Torch Comics (1940 series) #35 - Timely Comics
- Joker Comics (1942 series) #36 - Timely Comics
- Nipper, by Doug Wright, debuts in the March 12 issue of The Montreal Standard. The weekly comic strip would run until 1980 in magazines distributed across Canada.

=== April ===
- April 9: The final issue of the Italian Disney comics magazine Topolino is published. It becomes a digest instead.
- April 25: First publication of Wally Fawkes' (aka Trog) Flook in The Daily Mail.
- The final episode of the Belgian comic magazine Bimbo is published.
- In Walt Disney’s comics and stories, Rival beachcombers, by Carl Barks; debut of Judge Owl.
- Captain America Comics (1941 series) #72 - Timely Comics
- Lana (1948 series) #5 - Timely Comics
- Marvel Mystery Comics (1939 series) #91 - Timely Comics
- Sub-Mariner Comics (1941 series) #31 - Timely Comics
- Two-Gun Kid (1948 series) #7 - Timely Comics
- Venus (1948 series) #4 - Timely Comics

=== May ===
- May 22: First publication of Warren Tufts' Casey Ruggles as a Sunday strip. It will become a daily strip on 19 September.
- May 26, Mefisto la spia by Gian Luigi Bonelli and Aurelio Galleppini; Tex Willer meets his most famous antagonist, Steve Deckart, alias Mefisto. The villain, here, is again a simple illusionist and spy, without the supernatural powers that he will get later.
- The final issue of the Belgian comics magazine Wrill is published.
- Joker Comics (1942 series) #37 - Timely Comics

=== June ===
- Lana (1948 series) #6 - Timely Comics
- Marvel Mystery Comics (1939 series) #92. The final issue under this title; with the next issue it changes title and format to Marvel Tales - Timely Comics
- Sub-Mariner Comics (1941 series) #32 - Timely Comics - (The series will be cancelled for five years)
- Two-Gun Kid (1948 series) #8 - Timely Comics
- Venus (1948 series) #5 - Timely Comics
- Western Winners, with issue #5, takes over the numbering of All-Western Winners — Atlas Comics

=== July ===
- July 10: Jules Feiffer's gag comic Clifford, which appeared earlier this year during the spring in Will Eisner's one-shot Kewpies, is now moved to The Spirit comic book magazine as a back cover feature. It will run until 4 March 1951.
- July 16: In France, a censorship commission is established, Commission de Surveillance et de Contrôle des Publications Destinées à l'Enfance et à l'Adolescence, targeting children's literature, including comics to protect young readers, but also the French publishing industry from being overflooded and outrun by American comics, British comics and Belgian comics.
- July 21: Montales el desperado by Gian Luigi Bonelli and Aurelio Gallepini; debut of the Mexican revolutionary Montales, a recurring character in the Tex Willer saga.
- Captain America Comics (1941 series) #73 - Timely Comics - The series will be renamed to Captain America's Weird Tales
- Joker Comics (1942 series) #38 - Timely Comics

=== August ===
- August 4: Halfway the prepublication of The Adventures of Tintin story Land of Black Gold in Tintin Hergé leaves to take a 12-week resting vacation in Switzerland, because he suffered from clinical depression. The story won't be continued until 27 October.
- August 13: First publication of Pepo's Condorito.
- August 17: The first episode of Al Posen's Rhymin' Time is published.
- Best Love debuts with issue #33, taking over the numbering of Sub-Mariner Comics - Timely Comics
- Big Shot, with issue #104, is cancelled by Columbia Comics
- Girls' Love Stories (1949 series) #1 - DC Comics
- Lana (1948 series) #7 - Timely Comics
- Marvel Tales debuts with issue #93, taking over the numbering of Marvel Mystery Comics - Timely Comics
- Two-Gun Kid (1948 series) #9 - Timely Comics
- Venus (1948 series) #6 - Timely Comics

=== September ===
- September 11: The episode Ten Minutes, in the series The Spirit, is first published. This marks the first story written by Will Eisner's assistant Jules Feiffer, who will continue writing most of the series until 1952.
- Joker Comics (1942 series) #39 - Timely Comics

=== October ===
- October 16: The first gag of Poustiquet by Bindle is published. It will run over 25 years.
- October 30: Debut of Ellsworth Bheezer, in a Sunday page comic by Manuel Gonzales and Bill Walsh.
- Captain America's Weird Tales (1941 series) #74 - Timely Comics
- Cowboy Romances (1939 series) #1 - Timely Comics
- Alfred Harvey and Vic Herman's Little Dot makes her debut in Little Max Comics # 1.
- The final issue of Jerry Siegel and Joe Shuster's Slam Bradley is published.

=== November ===
- Boy Commandos (1942 series), with issue #36 dated November–December, cancelled by DC Comics.
- Little Lana (1948 series) #8 - Timely Comics - (Lana was renamed to Little Lana)
- Marvel Tales (1939 series) #94 - Timely Comics
- Two-Gun Kid (1948 series), with issue #10, cancelled by Timely Comics. (The title would be revived four years later by Marvel, continuing the numbering.)
- Venus (1948 series) #8 - Timely Comics

=== December ===
- In The Vault of Horror, the mascot character The Vault-Keeper makes his debut (designed by Johnny Craig, while in Tales From the Crypt, The Crypt-Keeper makes his debut (designed by Al Feldstein).
- December 3: First publication of Pecos Bill by Guido Martina and Raffaele Paparella.
- December 15: The final issue of the Dutch comics magazine Doe Mee is published.
- Cowboy Romances (1939 series) #2 - Timely Comics
- True Western (1939 series) #1 - Timely Comics

=== Specific date unknown ===
- Maurice Tillieux launches his detective series Félix in Héroïc-Albums, where it will run until 1956.
- The first episode of Roland Davies' Sparks and Flash is published.
- Lancelot Hogben publishes the book From Cave Painting to Comic Strip. A Kaleidoscope of Human Communication.
- Reverend David S. Piper and Joseph Wirt Tillotson launch the first episode of Our Bible in Pictures.
- Eric Stanton starts his erotic comic series Dianna, which will run until 1951.

== Births ==
=== April ===
- John Ostrander, American comic book writer (DC Comics, Valiant Comics).

=== June ===
- June 11: Steve Moore, British comics writer (Axel Pressbutton, Future Shocks, Tom Strong's Terrific Tales), (d. 2014).

== Deaths ==
=== January ===
- Specific date in January unknown: Jack Grandfield, British comics artist (drew a Sexton Blake comic), dies at age 37.

=== February ===
- February 6: Eugène Vavasseur, French illustrator, poster artist and comic artist, dies at age 85.
- February 15: Charles L. Bartholomew, aka Bart, American comics artist (Cousin Bill, George and his Conscience, Bud Smith, the Boy Who Does Stunts, Alexander the Cat, Mama's Girl-Daddy's Boy), dies at age 80.

=== March ===
- March 6: Storm P., Danish comics artist, animator, illustrator, painter and comedian (Peter og Ping), dies at age 66.
- March 16: Stanley E. Armstrong, American comics artist (continued Slim Jim And The Force), dies at age 85.
- March 21: Jo Valle, French comics writer (L'Espiègle Lili), dies at age 83.

=== April ===
- April 24: Reg Carter, British comics artist (Big Eggo) dies at age 62.

=== May ===
- May 12: Neysa McMein, American illustrator, painter and comics artist (Deathless Deer), dies at age 60.
- May 27: Robert Ripley, American comics writer, artist, cartoonist, entrepreneur, and anthropologist (Ripley's Believe It or Not!), dies at age 59 from a heart attack.

=== June ===
- 10 June: John T. McCutcheon, American political cartoonist and occasional comics artist (Bird Center), dies at age 79.

=== July ===
- July 13: Walt Kuhn, American painter, illustrator and comics artist (Whisk), dies at age 71.

=== October ===
- October 8: Monte Barrett, American comics writer (Jane Arden), dies at age 52.

=== November ===
- November 13: Bern L. Vinger, Dutch illustrator and comics artist (Met Toto Op Reis), dies at age 77.
- November 30: Lester J. Ambrose, American comics artist (Simp Simpson), dies at age 70.

=== December ===
- December 3: Frank Miller, American comics artist (Barney Baxter), dies from a heart attack at age 51.
- December 7: Bovil, Swedish painter, illustrator, sculptor and comics artist (Tusen Och en Natt), dies at age 39.
- December 8: Frank R. Leet, American comics artist (Al Acres), dies at age 68.
- December 11: Clifford K. Berryman, American cartoonist (Remember the Maine, Drawing the Line in Mississippi), dies at age 80.

=== Specific date unknown ===
- Jo Valle, French comics writer (L'Espiègle Lili), dies at age 84.
- André Vallet, French painter, illustrator and comics artist (L'Espiègle Lili), dies at age 79 or 80.
- Émile Vavasseur, French poster artist, comics artist and illustrator, dies at age 85 or 86.

== First issues by title ==
- Buster Bunny, cover dated November, published by Standard Comics
- Girl Comics, cover-dated October, published by Timely Comics
- Girls' Love Stories, cover dated August–September, published by DC Comics
- Heart Throbs, cover-dated August, published by Quality Comics
- Kid Colt Outlaw, cover-dated May, published by Timely Comics
- Superboy, cover-dated March/April, published by DC Comics
- Torchy, cover-dated November, published by Quality Comics

== Initial appearances by character name ==
- Pow Wow Smith in Detective Comics #151 (September), created by Don Cameron and Carmine Infantino - DC Comics
- Dr. Edward Clariss - Reverse Flash in Flash Comics #104 (February), created by John Broome and Joe Kubert - DC Comics
