= Jimmy Neutron (disambiguation) =

Jimmy Neutron is a fictional character.

Jimmy Neutron may also refer to:

- Jimmy Neutron (franchise)
- Jimmy Neutron: Boy Genius, the 2001 animated film
  - Jimmy Neutron: Boy Genius (video game), a video game based on the film
- The Adventures of Jimmy Neutron, Boy Genius, a television series sequel of the film
