= Arch Dale =

Scottish-born Canadian cartoonist

Archibald Dale (May 31, 1882 in Dundee – 1962 in Winnipeg) was a Scottish-born cartoonist, who lived and worked for most of his adult life in Canada and Chicago.

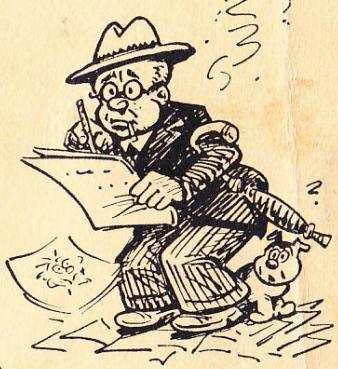
Arch Dale self portrait cartoon in 1945

Dale began his cartooning career as a teenager, doing various illustrated work for newspapers such as Glasgow Evening News. In the early 1920s, while living in Chicago, Dale created the comic strip The Doo Dads, which ran in several Canadian newspapers throughout the decade and reportedly also enjoyed success in merchandising. According to comics historian Bill Blackbeard, The Doo Dads seems to have been heavily influenced by the critically acclaimed comic strip Krazy Kat.

He subsequently moved to Canada, where he produced several cartoons for the Grain Growers' Guide. Dale retired in 1954, after working as a freelance artist at the Winnipeg Free Press for several decades.

His daughter Julie Dale was also a cartoonist.
