= Young Pillars =

American comic strip by Charles Schulz

Harold, the primary character of Young Pillars

Young Pillars is a single-panel gag strip written and drawn by Charles M. Schulz (best known for Peanuts) from 1956 to 1965 for the Youth Magazine published by the Church of God.

Unlike Peanuts, the comic featured teenagers, and most were religiously themed. The main character was named Harold.

The strips were frequently rerun, sometimes with edited captions.

Schulz made five additional similar gag panels, which ran (with one rerun from Youth) in the magazine Reach, another Church of God publication, in 1969.

Young Pillars was published in a three-volume collection in the early 1960s, and marketed as showing Charlie Brown and his friends as teenagers, although none of the characters shared the same names.
