= 80-Page Giant =

80-Page Giant was the name used for a series of comic books published by DC Comics beginning in 1964. The series was named for its unusually high page count (the typical page count for American monthly comics at this time was 32 pages). The cover price was initially 25 cents, while other comics of the day were rarely above 12 cents. Many of these "Giant" issues contained reprinted material, often including material from the Golden Age era of comics. Each issue would focus upon a particular DC character or group, such as Superman, Batman, or Jimmy Olsen. The 80-Page Giant format and numbering would later be used for special extra-large, reprint-heavy issues of their regularly published titles.

In the late 1990s, DC Comics began publishing 80-Page Giant specials which were special publications relating to a series (including Secret Origins, which had not been an ongoing title for years) and which were usually compilations.

Around this time, DC was also publishing reprint-themed 80-Page Giant Annuals (also called "100 Page Spectaculars"), some of which were reprinted replicas of past Annuals and some of which were newly published reprint collections styled as the Annuals of a Silver Age title that had no Annuals during its actual run.

== Number of pages ==
Originally, the Giant issues were all labeled 80 Page Giant. When the number of pages was decreased (usually to 64 pages), the "80 Page" part of the title was dropped and the title changed to simply Giant or DC Giant.

== Types of "Giant" comics ==
There were four types of "Giant" comics:

=== Issues G1 to G15 ===
These issues were published under the 80 Page Giant title. They had "80 Page Giant G##" on the cover:

- 80 Page Giant 01 - Superman
- 80 Page Giant 02 - Jimmy Olsen
- 80 Page Giant 03 - Lois Lane
- 80 Page Giant 04 - Flash
- 80 Page Giant 05 - Batman
- 80 Page Giant 06 - Superman
- 80 Page Giant 07 - Sgt. Rock
- 80 Page Giant 08 - Secret Origins
- 80 Page Giant 09 - Flash
- 80 Page Giant 10 - Superboy
- 80 Page Giant 11 - Superman
- 80 Page Giant 12 - Batman
- 80 Page Giant 13 - Jimmy Olsen
- 80 Page Giant 14 - Lois Lane
- 80 Page Giant 15 - Superman and Batman

=== Issues G16 and up ===
These were published under other series titles such as Justice League of America #39. In other words, 80 Page Giant #16 is the same as JLA 39. These had "80 Page Giant G##" or "DC Giant G##" or "Giant ##" on the cover (for example, 80 Page Giant G16).

The following is a complete list of the issues, ordered by date:

- 1965-11 80 Page Giant G16 Justice League of America 39
- 1965-12 80 Page Giant G17 Batman 176
- 1966-01 80 Page Giant G18 Superman 183
- 1966-02 80 Page Giant G19 Our Army at War 164
- 1966-03 80 Page Giant G20 Action Comics 334
- 1966-04 80 Page Giant G21 Flash 160
- 1966-05 80 Page Giant G22 Superboy 129
- 1966-06 80 Page Giant G23 Superman 187
- 1966-07 80 Page Giant G24 Batman 182
- 1966-08 80 Page Giant G25 Jimmy Olsen 095
- 1966-09 80 Page Giant G26 Lois Lane 68
- 1966-10 80 Page Giant G27 Batman 185
- 1966-10 80 Page Giant G28 World's Finest 161
- 1966-11 80 Page Giant G29 JLA 048
- 1966-12 80 Page Giant G30 Batman 187
- 1967-01 80 Page Giant G31 Superman 193
- 1967-02 80 Page Giant G32 Our Army at War 177
- 1967-03 80 Page Giant G33 Action Comics 347
- 1967-04 80 Page Giant G34 Flash 169
- 1967-05 80 Page Giant G35 Superboy 138
- 1967-06 80 Page Giant G36 Superman 197
- 1967-07 80 Page Giant G37 Batman 193
- 1967-08 80 Page Giant G38 Jimmy Olsen 104
- 1967-09 80 Page Giant G39 Lois Lane 77
- 1967-10 80 Page Giant G40 World's Finest 170
- 1967-11 80 Page Giant G41 Justice League of America 58
- 1967-12 80 Page Giant G42 Superman 202
- 1968-01 80 Page Giant G43 Batman 198
- 1968-02 80 Page Giant G44 Our Army at War 190
- 1968-03 80 Page Giant G45 Action Comics 360
- 1968-04 80 Page Giant G46 Flash 178
- 1968-05 80 Page Giant G47 Superboy 147
- 1968-06 80 Page Giant G48 Superman 207
- 1968-07 80 Page Giant G49 Batman 203
- 1968-08 80 Page Giant G50 Jimmy Olsen 113
- 1968-09 80 Page Giant G51 Lois Lane 86
- 1968-10 80 Page Giant G52 World's Finest 179
- 1969-11 80 Page Giant G53 Justice League of America 67
- 1968-12 80 Page Giant G54 Superman 212
- 1969-01 80 Page Giant G55 Batman 208
- 1969-02 80 Page Giant G56 Our Army at War 203
- 1969-03 DC Giant G57 Action Comics 373
- 1969-04 DC Giant G58 Flash 187
- 1969-05 DC Giant G59 Superboy 156
- 1969-06 DC Giant G60 Superman 217
- 1969-07 DC Giant G61 Batman 213
- 1969-08 DC Giant G62 Jimmy Olsen 122
- 1969-09 DC Giant G63 Lois Lane 095
- 1969-10 DC Giant G64 World's Finest 188
- 1969-11 DC Giant G65 Justice League of America 76
- 1969-12 DC Giant G66 Superman 222
- 1970-01 DC Giant G67 Batman 218
- 1970-02 DC Giant G68 Our Army at War 216
- 1970-03 DC Giant G69 Adventure 390
- 1970-04 DC Giant G70 Flash 196
- 1970-05 DC Giant G71 Superboy 165
- 1970-06 DC Giant G72 Superman 227
- 1970-07 DC Giant G73 Batman 223
- 1970-08 DC Giant G74 Jimmy Olsen 131
- 1970-09 DC Giant G75 Lois Lane 104
- 1970-10 DC Giant G76 World's Finest 197
- 1970-11 DC Giant G77 Justice League of America 85
- 1970-12 DC Giant G78 Superman 232
- 1971-01 DC Giant G79 Batman 228
- 1971-02 DC Giant G80 Our Army at War 229
- 1971-03 DC Giant G81 Adventure Comics 403
- 1971-04 DC Giant G82 Flash 205
- 1971-05 DC Giant G83 Superboy 174
- 1971-06 DC Giant G84 Superman 239
- 1971-07 DC Giant G85 Batman 233
- 1971-08 DC Giant G86 Jimmy Olsen 140
- 1971-09 DC Giant G87 Lois Lane 113
- 1971-10 DC Giant G88 World's Finest 206
- 1971-10 DC Giant G89 Justice League of America 93

=== Annuals ===
The following "Giant" issues were the forerunners of the 80 Page Giants (80 Page Giant G01 was originally advertised in DC titles as Superman Annual 09):

- 1960 - Superman v1 - Annual 01
- 1960 - Superman v1 - Annual 02
- 1961 - Secret Origins v1 - Annual
- 1961 - Superman v1 - Annual 03
- 1961 - Batman v1 - Annual 01
- 1961 - Superman v1 - Annual 04
- 1961 - Batman v1 - Annual 02
- 1962 - Lois Lane v1 - Annual 01
- 1962 - Superman v1 - Annual 05
- 1962 - Batman v1 - Annual 03
- 1962 - Rudolph the Red-Nosed Reindeer v1 - Annual
- 1962 - Batman v1 - Annual 04
- 1962 - Superman v1 - Annual 06
- 1963 - Batman v1 - Annual 05
- 1963 - Lois Lane v1 - Annual 02
- 1963 - Superman v1 - Annual 07
- 1963 - Flash v1 - Annual
- 1963 - Batman v1 - Annual 06
- 1963 - Superman v1 - Annual 08
- 1964 - Sgt. Rock's Prize Battle Tales - Annual
- 1964 - Superboy v1 - Annual
- 1964 - Batman v1 - Annual 07

=== The new 80-Page Giant (1998–2003) ===
DC published a number of 80 Page Giant specials within various current series. These began numbering with #1 within each series.

The following is a partial list of issues, sorted by title:

- 1998-10 - Adventure Comics 80 Page Giant 01
- 1999-09 - All Star Comics 80 Page Giant 01 (JSA)
- 1998-08 - Batman 80 Page Giant 01
- 1998-10 - Batman 80 Page Giant 02
- 2000-07 - Batman 80 Page Giant 03
- 1998-08 - Flash 80 Page Giant 01
- 1999-04 - Flash 80 Page Giant 02
- 1998-12 - Green Lantern v3 80 Page Giant 01
- 1999-06 - Green Lantern v3 80 Page Giant 02
- 2000-08 - Green Lantern v3 80 Page Giant 03
- 1998-07 - JLA 80 Page Giant 01 - The Green Bullet-Revelations
- 1999-11 - JLA 80 Page Giant 02
- 2000-10 - JLA 80 Page Giant 03 - The Century War #1-3
- 2000-01 - Legends of the DC Universe 80 Page Giant 01
- 1998-09 - Legends of the DC Universe 80 Page Giant 02
- 2000-12 - Nightwing 80 Page Giant
- 2003-xx - Plastic Man 80 Page Giant 01
- 2000-09 - Robin 80 Page Giant 01
- 2000-07 - Silver Age 80 Page Giant 01
- 1999-01 - Starman v2 80 Page Giant
- 1999-xx - Superman 80 Page Giant 01
- 1999-xx - Superman 80 Page Giant 02
- 2000-11 - Superman 80 Page Giant 03
- 2002-xx - Wonder Woman 80 Page Giant
- 1998-12 - Young Justice Secret Origins 80 Page Giant
- 1999-05 - Young Justice 80 Page Giant 01
- 1999-08 - DC One Million 80 Page Giant

== See also ==
- List of DC Comics publications
