= Jimmy Murphy (cartoonist) =

American cartoonist

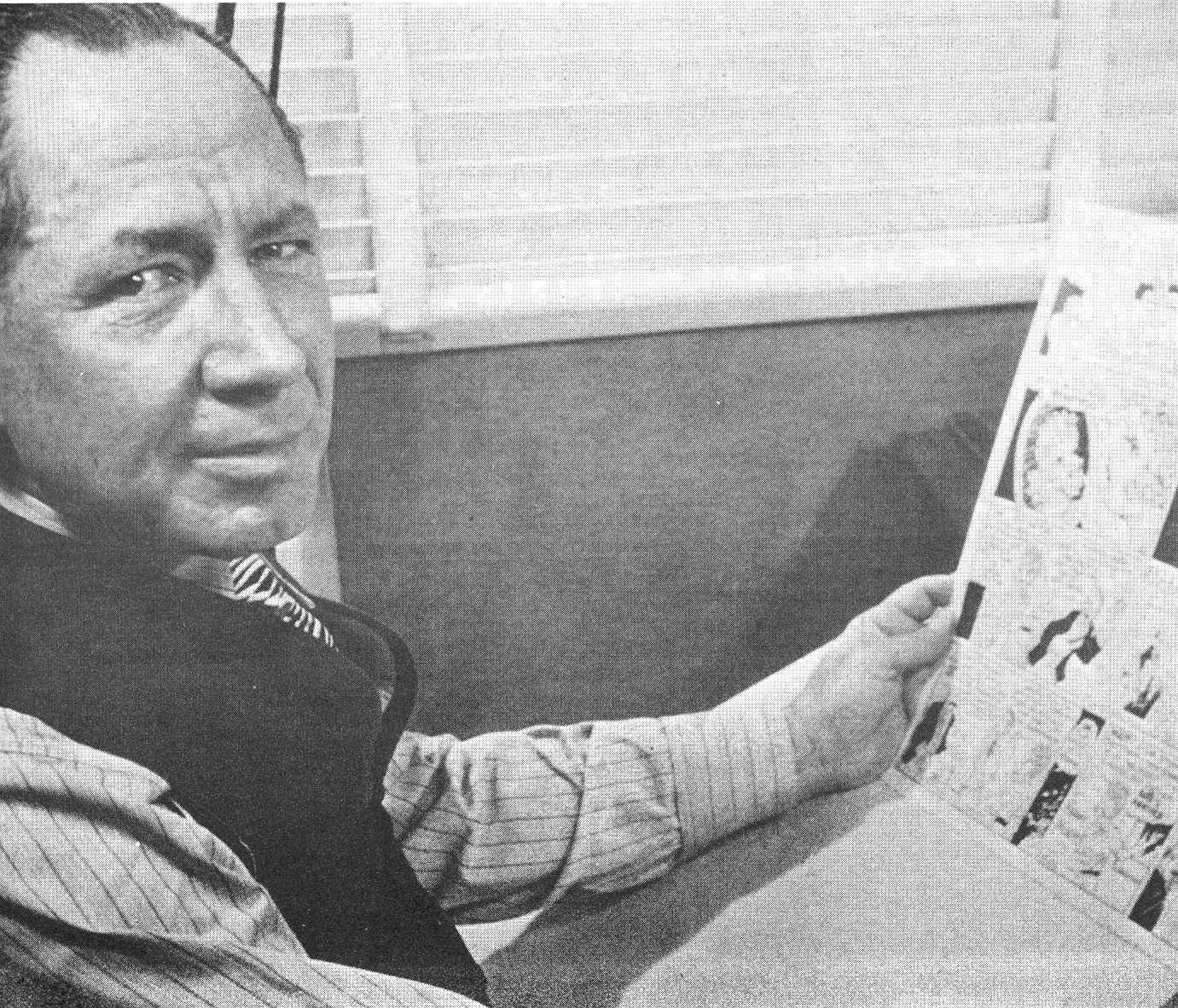
Jimmy Murphy

Small portion of Jimmy Murphy's Toots and Casper page for August 17, 1930

James Edward Murphy Jr. (November 20, 1891 – March 9, 1965) was a self-taught American cartoonist who is best known for his long-run family comic strip, Toots and Casper. His earliest strips, signed J.E. Murphy, had a crude awkward look, but as his cartooning improved, his full signature of Jimmy Murphy appeared.

Born in Chicago, Murphy grew up in Omaha, Nebraska. When he was 15 he began selling political cartoons to the local newspapers, including the Omaha Examiner. He briefly attended Creighton University in Omaha, but he left home in 1910, spending the next eight years drawing political cartoons for the Inland Herald (Spokane, Washington), the Oregon Journal (Portland, Oregon) and the San Francisco Call & Post.

== Doc Attaboy ==
In the summer of 1918, William Randolph Hearst beckoned, and Murphy arrived in New York for a job with Hearst's New York Journal and the New York American, where he decided to try a comic strip. For the New York American Murphy created Doc Attaboy, a strip about a middle-aged doctor more concerned with writing the bills instead of curing his patients. That short-lived strip continued until December 1918.

== Toots and Casper ==
The same month he dropped Doc Attaboy, he began Toots and Casper for the American, using his wife, Matilda Katherine Crane Murphy, as the model for Toots. The strip was picked up by King Features Syndicate in 1919, and by 1925, it was being carried in numerous newspapers. He left New York and moved to California, living for decades in Beverly Hills. His hobbies of motoring and golf often interfered with his deadlines, and his business records from the 1930s revealed that he often was so late that he shipped strips east by air express. The daily Toots and Casper ran until 1951, with the Sunday strip continuing until 1956.

== It's Papa Who Pays! ==

Beginning in 1926, he drew another Sunday comic strip, It's Papa Who Pays!, which ran above Toots and Casper as a topper until 1956. Toots and Casper remained a popular favorite with newspaper readers for decades. Between 1932 and 1941, he began including collectible stamps and paper dolls in his Sunday page. These features were so popular they were subsequently imitated by other cartoonists.

== Eat Right to Work and Win ==
In 1942, Murphy joined other King Features cartoonists (Carl Anderson, Lee Falk and Ray Moore, George McManus, Alex Raymond, Otto Soglow, Russ Westover and Chic Young) in donating art for a World War II booklet on nutrition, Eat Right to Work and Win, published in Toronto by Swift Canadian Co. Ltd. The booklet was created through several contributors, the National Nutrition Program, Office of Defense Health and Welfare Services, King Features and the Office of Civilian Defense.

== Licensing ==
Murphy profited from the licensing and merchandising of his creation. Toots and Casper items ran the gamut from dolls, books and pins to comic books and bisque nodders.

Murphy had a circulatory ailment, and between 1950 and 1955, he endured three major abdominal operations. His illness near the end of the comic strip's run prompted the hiring of ghost artists and the recycling of earlier strips (with new dialogue). He died in Beverly Hills, California in 1965.
