= Toots and Casper =

American comic strip by Jimmy Murphy

The strip was reprinted in Family Favorites #6 (February 1951). Toots and Casper are the second and third from the left in the bottom row.

Toots and Casper is a family comic strip by Jimmy Murphy, distributed to newspapers for 38 years by King Features Syndicate, from December 17, 1918 to December 30, 1956. The strip spawned many merchandising tie-ins, including books, dolls, paper dolls, pins, bisque nodders and comic books.

Comics historian Coulton Waugh commented on the strip's portrait of a happy, idealized family life: "Like Blondie, Toots is the picture of contentment, and if all homes were like these, the American Dream would be nearly realized."

== Characters and story ==
Toots and Casper began as a gag-a-day strip but soon settled into a successful pattern of serialized stories of romance and mystery involving newlyweds Toots and Casper Hawkins, their child Buttercup and dog Spare-Ribs (who entered a dog race with a $2500 prize in 1933).

Murphy began Toots and Casper for the New York American and other Hearst newspapers beginning December 17, 1918. He used his wife, Matilda Katherine Murphy, as the model for Toots.

The daily strip was picked up by King Features in 1919, and the Sunday strip began the following year (July 25, 1920). The Sunday page carried a topper strip by Murphy. For the first four months of 1926 (Jan 10-April 18), the topper was called Hotsy Totsy. On April 25, 1926, this was replaced with the long-running It's Papa Who Pays!, which ran for the rest of the series, ending on December 30, 1956. A couple of minor panels also appeared in the topper: Toots and Casper Comic Stamp Collection interrupted Papa in 1931, and a paper doll panel, Toots and Casper Comic Cut-Outs, appeared from 1932 to 1937.

Toots and Casper had a child, a boy named Buttercup, in November 1920. Buttercup remained a baby for over 20 years, eventually growing up to a six-year-old in the early 1940s, as noted by comics historian Don Markstein:

Young, stylish, vivacious Toots was the star in the beginning, with short, bald, middle-aged Casper a mere stereotype of the harried, put-upon husband. It's said Murphy based Toots (who, according to historian Coulton Waugh, was the first good-looking married woman in comics) on his own wife, but being a mere 26 years old at the time, probably didn't base Casper on himself. The strip only lasted a couple of months in this form, but was back for good in 1920. On its return, Casper was a little taller, a little hairier, a little younger and a lot more important as a character; and there were two additions—a Sunday page beginning in July of that year, and a baby named Buttercup born in December. The immensely popular Buttercup beat Gasoline Alley's Skeezix into print by three months, but Skeezix beat Buttercup to adulthood by a much greater margin. In fact, while Skeezix was in the U.S. Army, fighting World War II, the Hawkins kid was finally getting into grammar school—which is about as old as he ever got. Like the era's quintessential domestic strip, The Gumps, the Hawkins family (the three humans, plus a dog named Spare-Ribs) got into continuing stories as the 1920s rolled on. In the 1930s, with Dick Tracy, Buck Rogers and the like serving up daily doses of high adventure, the plots got more melodramatic. But the central theme, the funny side of family life, remained. During the early years of the strip, Toots' had a brunette haircut, but by 1925 Murphy changed her hair color to a reddish blond, which was kept until the strip ended.

Other characters included Casper's conceited neighbor Colonel Hoofer (alongside his wife Sophie and their son Teddy), who often found himself short on cash. Toots' uncles Everett Chuckle and Abner were also featured. Everett found and married his long-lost sweetheart Elsie in 1929, while Abner married Ellen Sullivan in 1934.

Both the daily and the Sunday strips were popular favorites for decades. In 1934, Murphy began including collectible images (formatted like postage stamps) in his Sunday strips along with paper dolls, and these features proved so popular they were subsequently imitated by other cartoonists. The daily Toots and Casper ran until November 17, 1951, with the Sunday strip continuing until December 30, 1956.

== Licensing and merchandising ==
There was a wave of Toots and Casper licensing and merchandising, with items that ran the gamut from pins and dolls to comic books. The daily continued until 1951, and the Sunday strip lasted until 1956. Murphy's illness near the end of the run prompted the recycling of earlier strips and the hiring of ghost artists.

== Films ==
Thelma Hill and Bud Duncan starred in the 1927-29 series of Toots and Casper silent comedy film shorts with Cullen Johnson as Buttercup and George Gray as Casper's boss.

== Cultural legacy ==
The strip gave rise to a much recited jump-rope rhyme:

Toots and Casper went to town.
Tootsie bought an evening gown,
Casper bought a pair of shoes,
Buttercup bought the Daily News.

== Sources ==
- Goulart, Ron, editor. Encyclopedia of American Comics. New York: Facts on File, 1990.
- Strickler, Dave. Syndicated Comic Strips and Artists, 1924-1995: The Complete Index. Cambria, CA: Comics Access, 1995. ISBN 0-9700077-0-1.
