= Neutron (Linus) =

Comic book series

Neutron is an Italian comic book series and the name of the eponymous main character created in 1965 by Guido Crepax. The series eventually became Valentina.

== Publication history ==
The first Neutron story, La curva di Lesmo, was published in the magazine Linus in May 1965. The series was centered on the superhero Neutron, and his fiancée Valentina was featured as a supporting character. The following story, I sotterranei published in February 1966, explored the origins of its main character, but subsequently became demoted to a peripheral character, as the series briefly was entitled Neutron/Valentina, and eventually Valentina by the end of 1967.

== Fictional character biography ==
Neutron is the alter ego of Philip Rembrandt, an art critic who since his youth has had the ability to paralyse people simply by meeting their gaze. He is revealed to be the descendant of a subterranean race from the city of Komyatan.

As an amateur investigator, Neutron solves some bizarre mysteries, but the few stories ultimately served as an introductory prequel for the photographer Valentina Rosselli, who became the main protagonist of stories of a different genre, and one of the most famous European comics characters.

The characters Valentina and Philip had a son named Mattia.

== Sources ==
- Linus publications JB index (in Italian)
- Crepax publications Fondazione Fossati (in Italian)

Footnotes
