= Guglielmo Letteri =

Italian comic book artist

Guglielmo Letteri (11 January 1926 in Rome – 2 February 2006 in Rome) was an Italian comic book artist, best known for his work on the Tex Willer comic.
