= 2021 in comics =

Notable events of 2021 in comics. It includes any relevant comics-related events, deaths of notable comics-related people, conventions and first issues by title.

== Events ==
=== January ===
- January 15: A rejected Tintin cover for the album The Blue Lotus is auctioned and sold for the record prize of 3.2 million euros (2.8. million British pounds).

=== February ===
- February 18: The Tintin shop in Lisbon, Portugal, is forced to close its doors forever, because of the ongoing COVID-19 lockdown measures.

=== March ===
- March 4: Japanese publisher Kodansha prints a 15-meter (49-foot) tall version of an Attack on Titan album. It breaks a record as the largest comic book of all time.
- March 6: The Chandras debut in their own strip Har Har's Joke Shop! in The Beano No.2075.
- March 8:
  - Hergé's estate, Moulinsart, sues artist Xavier Marabout for copyright infringement, since he uses The Adventures of Tintin characters in his paintings. He later wins his case.
  - 87-year-old comic artist José Delbo sells Wonder Woman artwork as a non-fungible token for $1.85 million during a crypto auction, in collaboration with the Italian Hackatao duo.
- March 9: Gerben Valkema, best known for the comic strip Elsje, wins the Stripschapprijs.

=== April ===
- April 6: A rare copy of Action Comics 1 (the first Superman comic) is auctioned for a record sale of $3.25 million at ComicConnect.com.
- April 29: After 40 years, Steve Bell's long-running political comic strip If... comes to an end.

=== May ===
- Specific date unknown: The obese character Fatty in the British comic series The Bash Street Kids is renamed Freddy.

=== June ===
- June 2: The characters Mandira Sharma and Harsha Chandra, who originated in earlier gag comics in The Beano, are introduced as recurring cast members in The Bash Street Kids.
- June 8: DC releases DC Pride, its first anthology series focusing on LGBTQ+ characters.
- June 9:
  - In Spain more than 300 comics artists protest and boycott the annual Barcelona International Comic Fair, because the winner of the Grand Prix is Antonio Martin, who is not a comics writer or artist, but a comics historian and publisher.
  - In Noordwijk, The Netherlands, the MoCA (Museum of Comic Art), Noordwijk opens its doors to the general public.
- June 27: In Nieuw-Vossemeer, The Netherlands, a bench with a mosaic drawing depicting the comic characters Bulletje en Boonestaak is revealed to the public.
- June 28: Studio Jan van Haasteren wins the annual P. Hans Frankfurtherprijs. The award is given to Jan van Haasteren and his two co-workers Rob Derks and Dick Heins.

=== July ===
- A revival of the weekly political-satirical gag comic spin-off of Jean Tabary's Iznogoud is launched as a webcomic series on the website La Vie Française. The new scriptwriter is Olivier Andrieu and the artist Elric.

=== August ===
- August 7: A comic mural designed by Belgian comic artist Kim Duchateau is inaugurated in Antwerp, Belgium.
- August 12: DC Comics announces that Robin will be outed as bisexual in an upcoming comic book story of Batman: Urban Legends, which features alternative storylines about Batman.

=== September ===
- September 9:
  - A copy of the first issue of Spider-Man is sold for the record-breaking prize of 3.6 million dollars.
  - A scandal breaks out in Ontario, Canada, when it is revealed that in 2019 30 schools have burned or removed 5,000 children's books, novels, encyclopedias and comics, for depicting "prejudice against indigenous peoples."
- September 17:
  - In Anderlecht, Belgium, Hotel Yooma opens its doors: the first hotel dedicated to Franco-Belgian comics.
  - In Charleroi, Belgium, a statue of Gaston Lagaffe is inaugurated at the Green Place.
- September 26: Dutch comics publisher Julius Goede wins the Dutch comic award the Bulletje en Boonestaakschaal.
- September 28: Belgian cartoonist Kamagurka wins the Dutch Inktspotprijs award for Best Political Cartoon.

=== October ===
- October 11: DC Comics announces that Jon Kent, the 17-year-old son of Superman, will be outed as bisexual in an upcoming comic book story.

=== December ===
- December 19: The freckled character Spotty in the British comic series The Bash Street Kids is renamed Scotty.

=== Specific date unknown ===
- Gary Panter releases the graphic novel Crashpad.
- Bernard Hislaire releases his graphic novel Mademoiselle Baudelaire, about the affair between poet Charles Baudelaire and his mistress Jeanne Duval.
- The final gag of Toon van Driel's De Stamgasten is printed in Algemeen Dagblad. The series had been running since 1981.
- Anton Gudim launches his webcomic series Yes...But'.

== Deaths ==
=== January ===
- January 1: Norbert Morandière, aka Norma, French comics artist (Capitaine Apache, Souvenirs de la Pendule, Hazel et Ogan), dies at age 74.
- January 8: Steve Lightle, American comics artist (Doom Patrol, continued Legion of Super-Heroes), dies at age 61 from cardiac arrest, brought on by COVID-19.
- January 15: Liz Berube, American comics artist and colorist, known for romance comics, dies at age 78.
- January 21:
  - Henryk Chmielewski, aka Papcio Chmiel, Polish comics artist, illustrator and journalist (Tytus, Romek i A'Tomek), dies at age 97.
  - Jean Graton, French comics writer and artist (Michel Vaillant, Julie Wood) and publisher (Éditions Graton), dies at age 97.
- January 24: Marcel Uderzo, French comics artist (Les Mémoires de Mathias, drew a comic strip based on The Twelve Tasks of Asterix, assisted on his brother Albert Uderzo's Tanguy et Laverdure and Astérix), dies at age 87.
- Specific date in January unknown: Antoni Bancells Pujadas, Spanish comics artist (Disney comics, assisted on Mortadelo y Filemon), dies at age 71 or 72.

=== February ===
- February 4: Vlastimil Zábranský, Czech painter, visual artist and comics artist, dies at age 84.
- February 7:
  - Oscar González Loyo, Mexican animator and comics artist (Karmatrón y Los Transformables), dies at age 61.
  - S. Clay Wilson, American underground comix artist (The Checkered Demon, Captain Pissgums and His Pervert Pirates), dies at age 79.
- February 8: Jean-Claude Carrière, French novelist, actor, screenwriter and comics writer (wrote comics for Bernard Yslaire and Pierre Étaix), dies at age 89.
- February 13: George Mandel, American writer and comics artist (The Woman in Red, comics for Better Publications), dies at age 101.
- February 16: Si Spencer, British TV writer and comics writer (Harke & Burr, The Creep, wrote for Judge Dredd), dies at age 69 or 70.
- February 19: Leopold Lippens, Belgian politician (namesake of the Leopold Lippens Prize at the Comics Festival of Knokke-Heist), dies at age 79.

=== March ===
- March 2: Claude Lacroix, aka Tartemption, Alias, French comics artist and illustrator (Farfelune, Yann Le Migrateur, Fariboles Sidérales, Cyann), dies at age 76.
- March 7: Frank Thorne, American comics artist (Red Sonja, Dr. Guy Bennett/ Dr. Duncan, Moonshine McJugs), dies at age 90.
- March 18: Picanyol, Spanish comics artist (Ot el bruixot, L'Illa Perduda), dies at age 73.
- March 19: Gary Leib, American cartoonist, musician and animator (Idiotland) dies at age 65–66.
- March 22: Gérard Depralon, French comic artist (Petrole Apache), dies at age 70.
- March 24: Willy Ophalvens, Belgian comic artist (Fratske, assistant of Berck), dies at age 82.
- March 27: Chris Yambar, American comics writer (SpongeBob SquarePants comics, The Simpsons comics, revival of The Yellow Kid) and artist (Mr. Beat), dies at age 59.
- March 30: Gonzalo Mayo, Peruvian comics artist (worked for Eerie and Vampirella), dies at age 81.

=== April ===
- April 5:
  - Joye Hummel, American comics writer (Wonder Woman), dies at age 97.
  - Frank Jacobs, American comics writer (Mad Magazine), dies at age 91.
- April 7: Michel Koeniguer, French comics artist (The Bridge, Bomb Road, Misty Mission, Berlin sera notre tombeau), dies at age 49.
- April 18: Cor Blok, Dutch illustrator and comics artist (The Iron Parachute), dies at age 87.

=== May ===
- May 1: John Paul Leon, American comic book artist (Static, Earth X, The Winter Men), dies at age 49.
- May 2: Pieter Aspe, Belgian novelist and comics writer (wrote comics in collaboration with cartoonists like Kim Duchateau, Marec, Merho and Patrick van Oppen), dies at age 68.
- May 6: Kentaro Miura, Japanese comics/manga artist (Berserk), dies at age 54 from aortic dissection.
- May 10: Marc Daniëls, Belgian comics writer and artist (Stam & Pilou, various celebrity comics) and co-founder of Studio Max!, dies at age 62 from COVID-19.
- May 18: Esegé, Spanish comics artist (Gustavo, el de la Calle del Diecinueve, Tito Sidecar, El Dinosaurio Jeremías), dies at age 63.
- May 19: David Anthony Kraft, American comics writer (Marvel Comics), critic (David Anthony Kraft's Comics Interview, Comics Revue) and publisher, dies at age 68.
- May 21: Ploeg, Belgian cartoonist and comic artist (Prosper), dies at age 85.
- May 28: Benoît Sokal, Belgian comics artist (Inspector Canardo), dies at age 66.
- May 29: Marcell Jankovics, Hungarian graphic artist, film director, animator and author (made a comic adaptation of The Canterville Ghost), dies at age 79.

=== June ===
- June 1: Bunny Matthews, American comic artist (Vic and Nat'ly), dies at age 70.
- June 5:
  - André Beckers, Belgian comic artist (La Patrouille des Aigles, Lieutenant Tompson, assisted on Buck Danny), dies at age 93.
  - James McQuade, American comics artist (Misty, The Sexy Adventures of Hoeny Hooker), dies at age 88.
- June 13: Nikita Mandryka, French comics artist (Le Concombre Masqué, Les Clopinettes) and publisher (co-founder of L'Écho des Savanes), dies at age 80.
- June 14: Tuono Pettinato, Italian comics writer and illustrator (Garibaldi. Resoconto veritiero delle sue valorose imprese, a uso delle giovini menti), dies at age 44.
- June 18: Asher Dikstein, Israeli comic artist (The Spaceship of Time, Mysteries of the Lost Continent), dies at age 77 or 78.
- June 23: Walli, Belgian children's book illustrator and comic artist (Kommerkat, Cosmic Connection, Gil Sinclair, continued Modeste et Pompon and Chlorophylle), dies at age 69.

=== July ===
- July 5:
  - Richard Donner, American film director and comics writer (co-wrote Superman stories with Geoff Johns and Adam Kubert), dies at age 91.
  - Danny Shanahan, American cartoonist (worked for The New Yorker), dies at age 64.
- July 14: Kurt Westergaard, Danish cartoonist (Jyllands-Posten Muhammad cartoons controversy), dies at age 86.
- July 24: Carlos Romeu Müller, Spanish comics artist (Miguelito), dies at age 73.
- July 25: Henri Vernes, Belgian novelist and comics writer (wrote the scripts to comic book adaptations of his own novel series Bob Morane), dies at age 102.
- July 31: Martin Perscheid, German comics artist (Perscheids Abgründe), dies at age 55.

=== August ===
- August 14:
  - Enzo Facciolo, Italian animator and comics artist (Clint Due Colpi, worked on Diabolik), dies at age 89.
  - Geneviève Gautier, French comic artist (Les Aventures du Pingouin Alfred), dies at age 99.
- August 18: Jill Murphy, British children's writer and illustrator (The Worst Witch, Large Family), dies at age 72.
- August 19: Raoul Cauvin, Belgian comics writer (Les Tuniques Bleues, Sammy, Agent 212, Les Femmes en Blanc, Pierre Tombal, Cédric, Cupidon, Pauvre Lampil, Les Psy, Taxi Girl, Le Vieux Bleu, Les Voraces, also wrote stories for Natacha and Spirou et Fantasio), dies at age 82.
- August 24: Charlie Watts, British rock drummer (The Rolling Stones) (made comic strips for his band's U.S. tour program and the back sleeve of their album Between the Buttons), dies at age 80.

=== September ===
- September 3: Henriette Valium, Canadian painter and comics artist, dies at age 62.
- September 8: Olmo, Spanish comic artist (Don Celes), dies at age 99.
- September 21: Nico Visscher, Dutch cartoonist and comics artist (De Wolken, Korrel), dies at age 88.
- September 24:
  - Gomaa Frahat, Egyptian political cartoonist, dies at age 80.
  - Ota, Brazilian comics writer, comics artist, cartoonist and publisher (Os Birutas, worked for the Brazilian edition of Mad Magazine), dies at age 67.
  - Takao Saito, Japanese comics/manga artist (Golgo 13, Kage Gari, Barom-1), dies from pancreatic cancer at age 84.
- September 27: hugOKÉ, Belgian cartoonist and comics artist (Belgman, Eddy Sterk Wint... De Spelen, Reynaert de Vos), dies at age 82.

=== October ===
- October 8: Santiago Martín Salvador, Spanish comic artist (worked on the comic strip based on The Saint and drew horror comics for Creepy), dies at age 85.
- October 17: Robin Wood, Paraguayan-Argentine comics writer (Nippur de Lagash, Dago, Gilgamesh el inmortal,...), dies at age 77.

=== November ===
- November 2: André Osi, Belgian comic artist (Horizon Blanc, Napoléon), dies at age 62.
- November 13: Leopoldo Ortiz Ortiz, Spanish comic artist (Bogey, Comisario Kelele, El Justiciero Enmascarado, worked for Eerie), dies at age 73.
- November 26: Vincenzo Jannuzzi, Italian comic artist (Ancillotto, Pike and Pike), dies at age 75.

=== December ===
- December 4: Nico van Welzenes, Dutch painter and comic artist (Peter Pik, Superlul), dies at age 85.
- December 8: Mitsutoshi Furuya, Japanese comic artist (Dame Oyaji, Bar Lemon Heart), dies at age 85.
- December 9: Don Asmussen, American comics artist (The San Francisco Strip, Bad Reporter, Super Average Joe), dies at age 59 from brain cancer.
- December 11: Hiroshi Hirata, Japanese comic artist, dies at age 84.
- December 18: Gérald Forton, Belgian-American comic artist (Kim Devil, continued Bob Morane, He-Man, Masters of the Universe newspaper comic), dies at age 90.

=== Specific date unknown ===
- Sandro Costa, Italian comic artist (worked for Rolf Kauka), dies at an unknown age.

== Exhibitions and shows ==
- Aug. 28, 2021 – Feb. 20, 2022: "Miné Okubo's Masterpiece: The Art of Citizen 13660" (Japanese American National Museum, Little Tokyo, Los Angeles)
- Sept. 15 – Dec. 8: "Legends: An Exploration of Contemporary Storytelling from Frame to Experience" (Bradbury Art Museum, Arkansas State University, Jonesboro, Arkansas)—exhibition with original art by such creators as JooYoung Choi, Michelle Czajkowski, Peter Kuper, Josh Neufeld, Trina Robbins, and Eric Shanower.
- Sept. 24 – Jan 16, 2022: "Art of the News: Comics Journalism" (Jordan Schnitzer Museum of Art, Eugene, Oregon) — work by Joe Sacco, Gerardo Alba, Dan Archer, Thi Bui, Tracy Chahwan, Jesús Cossio, Sarah Glidden, Omar Khouri, Victoria Lomasko, Sarah Mirk, Ben Passmore, Yazan al-Saadi, and Andy Warner
- Nov. 13, 2021 – May 8, 2022: "Dark Laughter Revisited: The Life and Times of Ollie Harrington" (Billy Ireland Cartoon Library & Museum, Ohio State University, Columbus, Ohio)

== Conventions ==
=== August ===
- August 21–22: Brooklyn Comic Con (Brooklyn Navy Yard, Brooklyn, NY)—held outdoors for health & safety reasons; second day canceled due to threatened hurricane
- August 28–29: Mini-MICE [Massachusetts Independent Comics Expo] (Starlight Square, Cambridge, Massachusetts) — annual indoor event (usually scheduled in October) cancelled due to COVID, so organizers hold Mini-MICE outdoors at Starlight Square

=== September ===
- September 25–26: Big Apple Comic Con (Wyndham New Yorker Hotel, New York City)—Celebrity guests: Jason David Frank, Vic Mignogna, Sarah Natochenny. Comics guests: Jim Shooter, Billy Tucci, Keith Williams, Amanda Conner, Jimmy Palmiotti, Reilly Brown. Silver Anniversary show; workshops by The Kubert School

=== October ===
- October 7–10: New York Comic Con (Jacob K. Javits Convention Center, New York City)
- October 22–24: Baltimore Comic-Con (Baltimore Convention Center, Baltimore, Maryland)
