= Escape from Fort Bravo =

1953 film

- 1953 Theatrical Poster
- Directed by: John Sturges
- Written by: Michael Pate; Phillip Rock; Frank Fenton
- Produced by: Nicholas Nayfack
- Starring: William Holden; Eleanor Parker; John Forsythe
- Cinematography: Robert L. Surtees
- Edited by: George Boemler
- Music by: Jeff Alexander
- Distributed by: Metro-Goldwyn-Mayer
- Release date: December 4, 1953
- Running time: 98 minutes
- Country: United States
- Language: English
- Budget: $1,520,000
- Box office: $3,158,000

Escape from Fort Bravo is a 1953 American Anscocolor Western film set during the American Civil War. Directed by John Sturges it stars William Holden, Eleanor Parker, and John Forsythe.

== Plot ==
Fort Bravo is a Union prison camp with a strict disciplinarian named Captain Roper (William Holden). A pretty woman named Carla Forester (Eleanor Parker) shows up to help with the wedding of her friend, but she has really come to assist in freeing some prisoners including her previous beau Confederate Captain John Marsh (John Forsythe). Roper falls in love with her and she with him, and the escape happens after the wedding celebrations. Carla unexpectedly leaves with the four Confederate escapees. This gives Roper an additional motive to recapture the prisoners. He does just that, but on the way back to the fort, the group is attacked by fierce Mescalero Apaches who are hostile to both sides, and the group ends up trapped in a shallow exposed depression. Roper frees and arms his prisoners, but even then, it looks like the Apaches will wipe them out. Bailey (John Lupton), a proven coward, escapes when one of their loose horses returns in the night. One by one, the rest of the group are killed, including Campbell (William Demarest), Young (William Campbell), and the Kiowa guide. Marsh and Lieutenant Beecher (Richard Anderson) are wounded. The next morning, in an effort to save Carla and Beecher, Roper walks out in plain view, making it appear that he is the sole survivor. He is wounded, but the cavalry comes to the rescue just in time. Roper thanks Bailey for coming with help, while Marsh dies after smiling at Bailey who has come through and shown he is not a coward.

== Cast ==
- William Holden as Captain Roper
- Eleanor Parker as Carla Forester
- John Forsythe as Captain John Marsh
- William Demarest as Sgt. Campbell
- William Campbell as Cabot Young
- Polly Bergen as Alice Owens
- Richard Anderson as Lieutenant Beecher
- Carl Benton Reid as Colonel Owens
- John Lupton as Bailey
- Forrest Lewis (uncredited) as Dr. Miller
- Howard McNear (uncredited) as Watson
- Glenn Strange appears briefly (uncredited) as Sgt. Compton

Several members of the supporting cast would have notable careers in television shows of the 1960s and '70s.

== Production notes ==
The working titles of this film were Rope's End and Fort Bravo. Production ran from April until late May 1953. Most of the film was shot on location in Gallup, New Mexico and Death Valley National Park.

== Reception ==
The film received a mixed review from Howard Thompson of The New York Times. While he found Sturges's direction full of "professional smoothness," he had many problems with Frank Fenton's "fuzzily defined" characters. The cast, he goes on, "seems confused throughout." Leonard Maltin disagreed, calling the film "well-executed" and awarding it three stars in his independent movie review guide.

In his book The Story of Cinema critic David Shipman wrote that the last act, in which with the attacking Indians use their arrows as "artillery spotting", "lifts this film to classic status".

The film serves as an inspiration for the fifth title in the Belgian comic book series Les Tuniques Bleues (The Bluecoats) by Raoul Cauvin and Willy Lambil, a graphic novel titled "Les Déserteurs" (1975)

=== Box office ===
According to MGM records, the film earned $1,525,000 in the US and Canada and $1,633,000 elsewhere, resulting in a profit of $104,000.
