= North & South (video game) =

1989 video game

- Developers: Infogrames; Kemco (NES)
- Publishers: Infogrames; Kemco (NES)
- Programmers: NES; Tomoharu Aihara; Fumio Tono; Koichi Shindo; Minori Shinagawa; Hiroyuki Masuno; Shinobu Michiura
- Artists: NES; Y. Shintaku; Kiminari Sueda
- Writer: Didier Chanfray; Philippe Agripnidis; Stéphane Baudet
- Composers: Amiga; Charles Callet; Commodore 64; Jeroen Tel; NES; Hiroyuki Masuno, Y. Kawakami
- Platforms: Amiga, Atari ST, Commodore 64, MS-DOS, MSX, NES, ZX Spectrum, Amstrad CPC
- Release: September 1989: Amiga, Atari ST; 1990: NES; 1991: Other ports
- Genres: Strategy, action
- Modes: Single-player, multiplayer

North & South is a strategy action game released in 1989 for the Amiga, and Atari ST and ported to the Nintendo Entertainment System, Amstrad CPC, MSX, MS-DOS, Commodore 64 and ZX Spectrum. It was developed and published by Infogrames.

North & South is an offshoot of the Belgian comic series Les Tuniques Bleues (by Raoul Cauvin and Louis Salverius/Willy Lambillotte, from Dupuis) which is based on the American Civil War. The player acts out the Civil War, choosing to play as either the North or the South. The player may choose to start the game year from 1861 (the year the Civil War erupted) to 1864. Each year has a different array of armies and states that each side starts with.

North & South contains humorous elements, such as parodies of national anthems, which are accessible when the player selects one of the different languages supported by the game (English, French, Spanish, German or Italian).

== Gameplay ==
Taking a simplified board interface, the game features a strategic map of the United States separated into states and territories, where army units are moved around. In each state which has a railway station, there is a fort, the capture of which leads to the player overtaking the whole state. Otherwise, capturing a state involves simple movement, unless there is an enemy army present on the state's title. Armies can be reinforced in two ways: by turning on an option in the main menu, the player controlling the state of North Carolina will get periodic reinforcements by ship; additionally, railways generate money, which in turn generates soldiers. Moving their army units, the player may expand westwards into unoccupied territory. If two antagonistic armies clashes, it will result in a battle.

Normally, the battle is resolved in a real time action element. However, players may turn off in-game missions and battles so that gameplay closer resembles a board game. When opposing armies meet in this mode, the results of battles are left to chance, with the outcome weighted towards the larger army. Either army may retreat from these battles. The outcome is also randomised for side attempts to capture an enemy fort or rob a train.

=== Battle ===
The battle screen, one of the action elements in the game, is different from the strategic map. Each player starts on opposite sides of the screen and controls an army consisting of infantry, cavalry and artillery. A standard army consists of six infantry, three cavalry and one cannon. Armies can be increased by up to three times their standard size by merging them together. Each team can only have six infantry, three cavalry and three cannons on the battlefield at one time. A human player can only control one class of units at any one time (although once the cavalry starts a charge, they can be left moving automatically forward in a straight line while the player focuses on either the cannon or infantry). A computer-controlled opponent can move all three classes of units at once, but their infantry and cavalry are not very aggressive. All units in the same class move and fire simultaneously. The infantry can move in any direction including backwards and have a short-range weapon.

Cavalry are melee units that are much faster than infantry, but can not move backwards. Cavalry, will instead return to the battlefield every time they reach the end of it after a few seconds. Cavalry that returns in this way will stop moving when returning to their start position on the left-right axis, unhindered by any movement on the up-down axis. It is to note that Cavalry, once movement has started, will not stop moving forwards unless the player actively pulls the horse reigns by pushing backwards with the control method of choice. Cannons can only move vertically and not sideways. Each cannon can only be fired nine times in a battle before they automatically withdraw from battle. If an army wins after their cannons have withdrawn from battle, their cannons will be available for the next battle. If, however, the rest of the army is killed after the cannons have withdrawn, the cannons will be also lost. In the middle of the battle map, there may be a river or a chasm, in which case a bridge serves as a choke point where the fighters are likely to meet. The bridge can be destroyed by cannons. One hit will leave a hole in the bridge where units can fall in and die instantly, while two hits on a bridge will destroy it.

In every battlefield where there is either a river or canyon, there is a narrow, indestructible passage across. The cannons are long-range weapons, but aiming – or rather determining the exact range – is not always easy. Care has to be taken when firing cannons to avoid friendly fire. A battle is usually a deathmatch, although a player may retreat. If the attacking army retreats, they will return to the state that it were in at the beginning of that turn. If the defending army decides to retreat, they will move to an adjacent state that is still under their control, surrendering that state the battle was on to their enemy. The defenders can not retreat if there are no adjacent states that they own. Retreating will result in the loss of any cannons that the army has. The army of the computer-controlled opponent will retreat if all of its cannons have been destroyed and its enemy has more than three times the units than it has.

=== Events ===
On the states that have a train station, the player must do a short side-scrolling mission through a fort to capture that state. Here, the player controls a single soldier who runs towards the goal (before the clock reaches the end) while meeting obstacles such as enemy soldiers, dynamite crates or dogs, with only the help of knives or punches that send enemies towards the sky, Asterix style. On occasions, the player also gets the opportunity to capture an enemy train similarly, but an attacker running alongside a train too long will just see it leave; it is possible to climb on the train. Successfully capturing an enemy train gets its gold.

If an option is turned on, a storm cloud will sit on one state each turn. The cloud will move to an adjacent state twice each month, once before each player's turn. Any army on the state with the cloud will not be able to move on that turn.

If the option on the main menu is turned on, there will be two non-player sides that pose a threat to the player's armies. A Native American who lives to the west of the territory might hurl a giant tomahawk randomly at one of the westernmost states (Kansas or Nebraska), destroying the army unfortunate enough to be garrisoned there. Similarly, a sombrero-clad Mexican living in the southwest might suddenly wake up from his siesta and toss a bomb into Texas, the result being the same.

If the option is turned on, the side that controls North Carolina has a chance each turn that free reinforcements will arrive in the state via ship.

== Reception ==
Reception

Awards
Publication	Award
Crash	Crash Smash
Your Sinclair	Megagame
Amstrad Action	Mastergame

Computer Gaming World gave North & South one-plus stars out of five for wargamers and three out of five for arcade gamers. In 2011, Wirtualna Polska ranked it as the tenth-best Amiga game.

== Remakes ==
In June 2012, Microïds (Anuman Interactive’s adventure game label) released The Bluecoats: North vs South, a remake for iOS and Android compatible devices and for Windows. The iOS version received a metascore of 60 on Metacritic.
The Steam PC and the console versions were delisted in first half 2023 and after July 2024, respectively.

Another remake, titled North & South: The Game, was released for iOS on November 6, 2012, by bitComposer Entertainment AG.

On 27 October 2020 The Bluecoats: North & South released for Nintendo Switch, Xbox One and PlayStation 4 by Microïds. A PC version followed on 5 November 2020, on Steam and GOG.com
