= Un chariot dans l'Ouest =

- Author(s): Louis Salvérius and Raoul Cauvin

Un chariot dans l'Ouest (A Carriage in the West) is the first in Les Tuniques Bleues comic series by Louis Salvérius and Raoul Cauvin. It was published for the first time at No. 1689 and No. 1706 in Spirou magazine in 1970, then as an album in 1972.

== Plot ==
Somewhere in the southwestern United States, the conflict between Indian tribes and the 'Bluecoats' rages. A patrol of Fort Bow is surprised when a messenger of the Union pursued by several Comanche Indians appears. His cavalcade goes wrong, since an arrow hits him. He is narrowly saved by the soldiers, and treated at Fort Bow, where he explains to the general that his fort, Fort Defiance, is overwhelmed by Indian raids. This fort is on the edge of Indian Territory border. They need urgent reinforcements, and the general intends to send them a cart full of ammunition. Chesterfield, who has lied to the general's daughter, Amelia, is thus appointed to accomplish this dangerous mission, since it will be necessary to cross the enemy lines. Accompanied by Blutch, Tripps and Bryan, the garrison rush to Fort Defiance, unaware that their adventures are far from over.
