= Daniel Kox =

Belgian cartoonist and comics artist (born 1952)

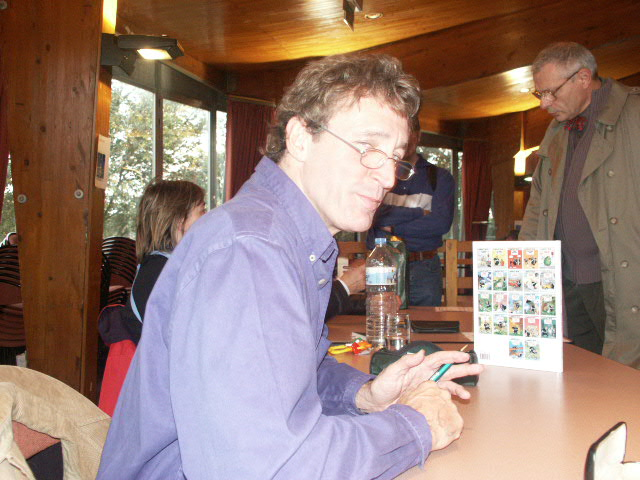
- Born: 4 February 1952 (age 74); Ottignies, Belgium

Daniel Kox (born 4 February 1952, Ottignies) is a Belgian comics artist, best known for his comics series Agent 212.

== Biography ==
Early in his career, Kox worked as an assistant for Dino Attanasio.

In 1970 began publishing Vladimir et Firmin (Vladimir and Firmin), a series of one-page strips about a forest ranger and a poacher that appeared in the Belgian comics monthly magazine Samedi-Jeunesse and in 1974, started working with Spirou magazine. In 1975, Kox and writer Raoul Cauvin created Agent 212, a humorous about a somewhat gaffe-prone policeman. This very successful series remains Kox' best known work and thirty volumes have been published by Dupuis since 1981.
