= Malik (artist) =

Belgian comic book artist (1948–2020)

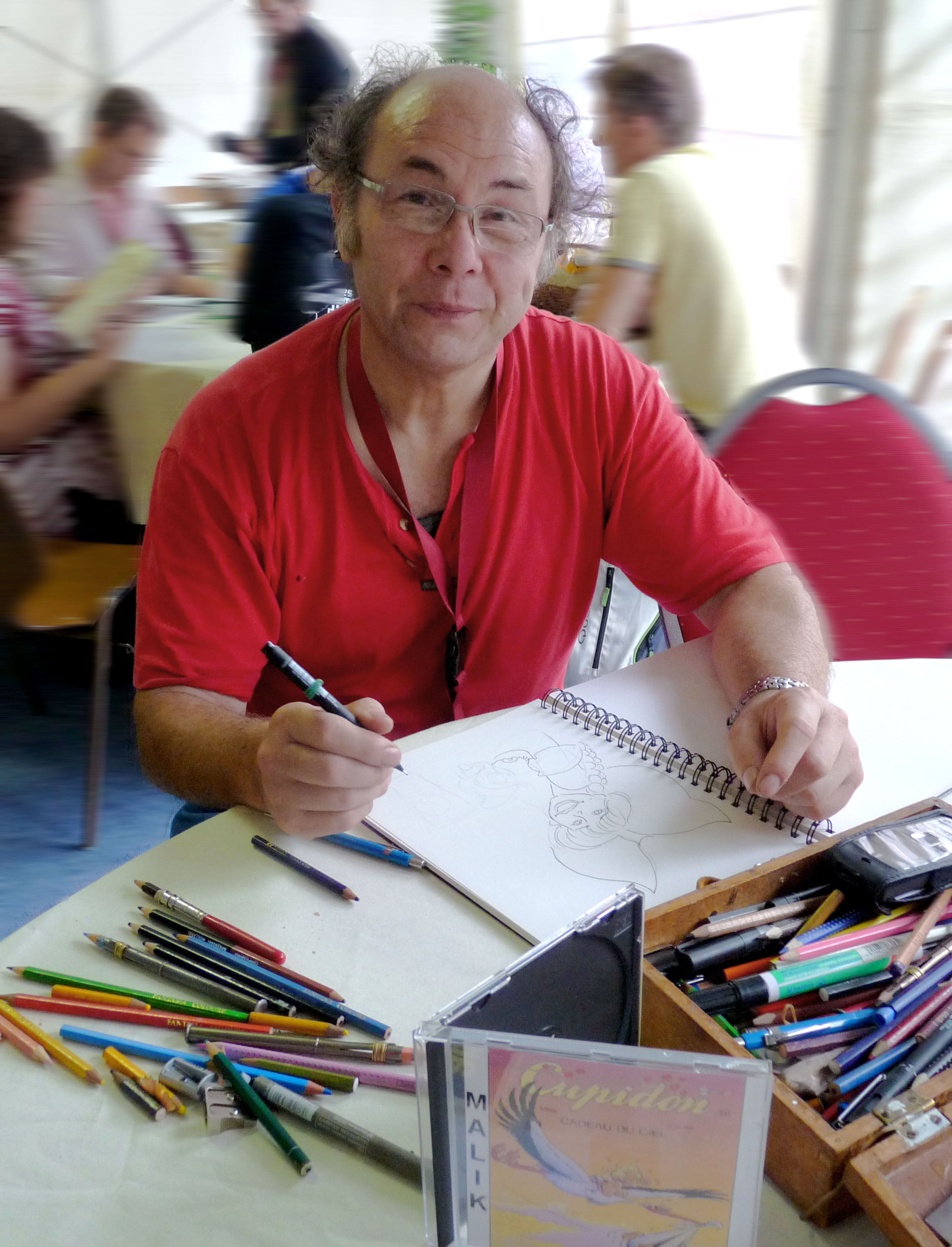
- Malik in 2009
- Born: William Tai; 2 January 1948; Paris, France
- Died: 11 December 2020 (aged 72); Huppaye, Belgium
- Occupation: Comic Book Artist

William Tai (2 January 1948 – 11 December 2020), known professionally as Malik, was a Belgian comic book artist, best known for his action series Archie Cash and his humor comic Cupidon, both prepublished in Spirou.

== Publications ==
=== Series ===
==== Archie Cash ====
- Le Maître de l'épouvante (1973)
- Le Carnaval des zombies (1974)
- Le Déserteur de Toro-Toro (1975)
- Un train d'enfer (1976)
- Cibles pour Long Thi (1977)
- Où règnent les rats (1978)
- Le Démon aux cheveux d'ange (1978)
- Asphalte (1982)
- Le Cagoulard aux yeux rouges (1983)
- Le Chevalier de la mort verte (1984)
- The Popcorn Brothers (1985)
- Les Petits Bouddhas qui chantent faux (1986)
- Les Rastas et le bouffon bleu (1987)
- Chasse-cœur à Koa-Gule (1987)
- Curare (1988)
- Qui a tué Jack London ? (2019)

==== Blue Bird ====
- Un duel dans une guitare (1984)
- Twiggy dans la souricière (1984)

==== Chansons cochonnes ====
- Chansons cochonnes (1990)
- Chansons cochonnes 2 (1991)
- Chansons cochonnes 3 (1992)
- Chansons paillardes (2014)

==== Chiwana ====
- De la poussière et des larmes (1984)
- Barils, Barbouzes & Barillets (1985)

==== Les Colonnes du ciel ====
- La Saison des loups (1989)
- La Lumière du lac (1992)

==== Cupidon ====
- Premières flèches (1990)
- Philtre d'amour (1991)
- Baiser de feu (1991)
- Souffle au cœur (1992)
- Arc en ciel (1993)
- L'Ange et l'Eau (1994)
- Un amour de gorille (1995)
- Je l'aime un peu… (1996)
- Vive la mariée (1997)
- Coup de foudre (1998)
- Lune de miel (1999)
- Le Cœur dans les nuages (2000)
- Jour de chance (2001)
- Toutes les amours du monde (2002)
- Plus jamais seul (2003)
- Cadeau du ciel (2004)
- Amour en cage (2005)
- Rien que pour vous ! (2006)
- Solitude (2007)
- Elles et Moi (2008)
- Le Nœud du problème (2009)
- Une copine pour Cupidon (2012)
- Fous d'ailes (2013)

==== Johnny Paraguay ====
- La Captive du Baron Samedi (1983)
- Stalnaker (1985)

==== Sortilège ====
- Sortilège I (2011)
- Sortilège II (2013)
- Sortilège III (2018)

=== One-Shots ===
- Rire c'est rire (1995)
- Gertrude au pays des belges (1996)
- Un amour de province… le Brabant wallon (2005)
- En chemin elle rencontre… Les artistes se mobilisent contre la violence faite aux femmes (2009)
- Avec Vauban (2010)
- Alianah - Un conte de Guy d'Artet (2015)
