= Les Femmes en Blanc =

Belgian-French comics humor series about nurses

Women in white (Les Femmes en Blanc)
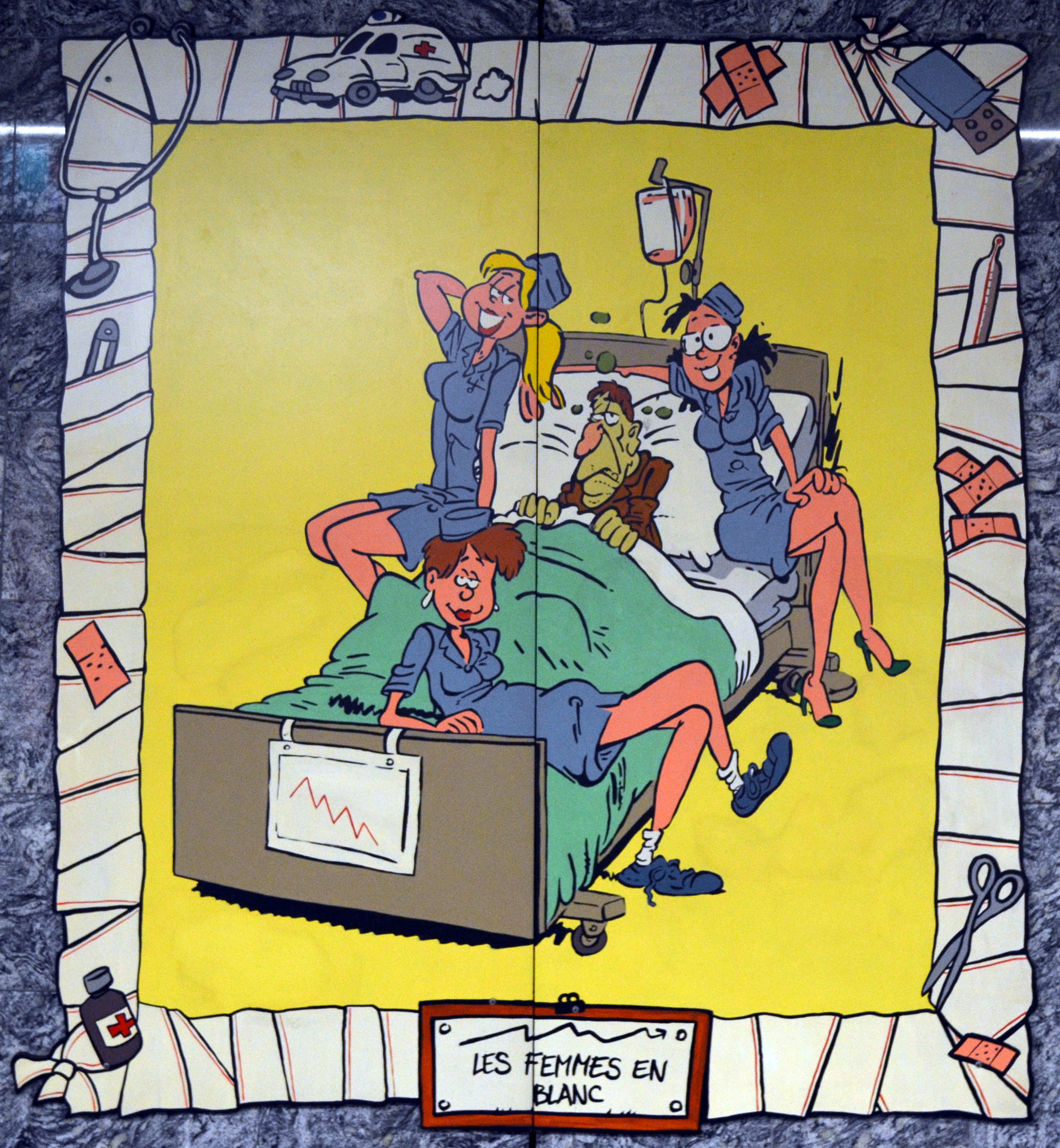
- No. of issues: 42
- Page count: 46 pages
- Publisher: Dupuis

Creative team
- Writers: Raoul Cauvin
- Colourists: Leonardo
- Editors: Philippe Bercovici

Original publication
- Published in: Spirou
- Issues: No. 2240

Les Femmes en Blanc (English: Women in White) is a Belgian-French comics humor series of 42 album volumes, scripted by Belgian comic writer Raoul Cauvin and drawn by French comic artist Philippe Bercovici. Colours were done by Leonardo. The series debuted in 1981 in the Belgian comic book magazine Spirou and the first volume was released in 1986.

== Synopsis ==
The setting of the series is a field hospital. The series deals with the troubles of nurses in a humorous and sometimes ironic, sometimes comic fashion.

A series of short stories with a title are illustrated, and usually deal with some foible, with a medical problem or quirk. For example, in volume 29, the story A malin, malin et demi deals with a patient with nausea, vomiting, and dizziness. The nurse helps him to the bathroom and back. The toilet starts to run and the nurse calls a plumber to fix it. He discovers a bottle of booze in the tank, nearly empty. The nurse realizes that the patient is an alcoholic and has been going to the bathroom to drink and arranges to dry him out. The plumber then tells his incredulous wife at dinner.

== Characters ==
Over the albums (whose titles contain puns), several characters appear regularly as the doctor or nurse Nathalie Minet or nurse Lisette.

== Albums (Dupuis issues) ==
- Les Femmes en blanc (Women in White) (1986)
- Gaze à tous les étages (Gaze at all floors) (1987)
- Superpiquées (Super nosedives) (1987)
- Les jeunes filles opèrent (Girls operate) (1988)
- J'étais infirme hier (I was crippled yesterday) (1989)
- Gai rire à tout prix (Gay laugh at all costs) (1989)
- Pinces, sang, rires (Pliers, blood, laughter) (1990)
- Six foies neufs (Six new livers) (1991)
- Piquées de grève (Dotted strike) (1992)
- Machine à coudre (Sewing Machine) (1992)
- Sang dessus dessous (Blood-turvy (Note: A play on topsy-turvy)) (1993)
- Cœur d'artiste chaud (Heart of the hot artist) (1994)
- En voie de disparition (Endangered) (1995)
- Des corps rompus (Broken Bodies) (1996)
- Avant que le cor ne m'use! (Before the horn does not wear out!) (1996)
- Elle met mal l'alèse (She puts the wrong mattress) (1997)
- Le drain sifflera trois fois (High Noon (Note: A pun on the film High Noon)) (1998)
- Opération duo des nonnes (Operation two nuns) (1998)
- L'aorte sauvage (The Wild aorta) (1999)
- Je panse donc je suis (I'm dressed so I) (2000)
- Corps de garde (Body Guard) (2000)
- Délivrez-nous du mâle (Deliver us from men (Note: A pun on Deliver us from evil, playing on the similarities of mâle (male) and mâl (evil))) (2001)
- Perles rares (Rare Pearls) (2002)
- Si le cœur vous en dit (If your heart says) (2003)
- Lésions étrangères (Foreign Lesions) (2004)
- Opération en bourse (Operation stock exchange) (2005)
- Viscères au poing (Viscera in hand) (2005)
- Invité donneur (Guest donor) (2006)
- Au diable la varice (To hell with the varicose) (2007)
- Overdose (Overdose) (2008)
- Rentabilité maximum (Maximum profitability) (2009)
- Le chant du panaris (The Song of paronychia (Note: A pun on whitlow)) (2010)
- Sangsue alitée (Bedridden leech) (2011)
- Lavez, Maria (Wash, Maria) (2012)
- Des lits de fuite (Leakage beds) (2013)
- Neuf mois de gros stress (Nine months of stress) (2014)
- Un bacille heureux (A happy bacillus) (2015)
- Potes de chambre (Roommates) (2016)
- Baby Boum ! (Baby Boom!) (2017)
- Soufflez ! (Blow!) (2018)
- Traitement et sale air ! (Treatment and dirty air!) (2019)
- La radio de la méduse (Jellyfish radio) (2020)

== Translations ==
The series has also been published as

- Mujeres de blanco (Spanish)
- Vrouwen in 't Wit (Dutch)
- Humor Rumah Sakit (Indonesian)
