= Cédric (comics) =

Belgian comics series

Cedric
- Main character Cédric with the French series logo

Publication information
- Publisher: Dupuis (French); Cinebook (English)
- Format: Ongoing series
- Genre: Humor comics, gag cartoon
- Publication date: 1986
- No. of issues: 35

Creative team
- Created by: Laudec and Cauvin
- Written by: Raoul Cauvin
- Artist: Laudec

Cédric is a Belgian comics series written by Raoul Cauvin, illustrated by Laudec, and published by Dupuis.

The comic is about the adventures of a mischievous young boy named Cédric. Since 1989, 23 albums have been published by Dupuis. Cédric is one of the most popular French-language comics according to the list of best-selling new comics of the ACBD, with e.g. in 2006 alone, 288,900 albums, putting Cédric at the fourth spot. By 2008, Cédric had dropped to the 8th position, still selling around 273,000 copies that year. A series of animated cartoons based on the comic have been produced as well.

== Characters ==
- Cédric is an eight-year-old boisterous boy arriving at his new school, in the first volume. He quickly meets Christian, who becomes his best friend, and Miss Nellie, his teacher with whom he falls in love. He lives with his maternal grandfather and his parents with an often tense atmosphere between his father Robert and his grandfather Jules. Regularly, his mother Mary-Rose does not cook so his annoyed grandfather Jules threatens to leave for the hospital. Cédric is a very bad student since he is in love with Miss Nellie. Whenever he has to show his grades to his father Robert, he finds a trick to go out and play with his friends. In all the volumes or episodes, he has a fight with someone.
- Mary-Rose, is Cédric's mother and Robert's wife. She is a stay-at-home mum and regularly tries to avoid arguments with her husband Robert and her father Jules. She loves Cédric, even though she sometimes puts it in all its forms. She knows how to be strict with her son, for example when he has to walk his neighbour's dog.
- Robert, is Cédric's father and Mary-Rose's husband. He is a carpet salesman, met his wife Mary-Rose in his shop and he resents his father-in-law. He is often angry and shouts, especially when Cédric brings back his grades. But he can give good advice to his son when it is most needed.
- Jules Boudinet, is Cédric's grandfather and Mary-Rose's father. He is retired, who hates his son-in-law, but does not hide it. He does not like the fact that he is a carpet seller. He often threatens to go to the hospital if he is not treated properly. He explains Robert is a seller of "mats", which greatly annoys him. He shares a great complicity with Cédric, his grandson: Always telling him stories of his youth, but he can commit blunders sometimes. For example, once, Cédric is aware of the financial difficulties of his parents. He will therefore seek employment in all businesses in the city to earn money, even though he's only 8 years old. His grandfather often gives him advice based on his own experience. His nickname is Poppy.
- Chen Yauping, is Cédric's East Asian girlfriend who arrives at the school in the third volume. Immediately, Cédric falls in love with Chen and becomes gently possessive and jealous if another guy comes up to her or to him to talk about her. Chen is annoyed by Cédric but still considers him as a friend. She often plays jump rope with other girls. Cédric does everything to please her, but she doesn't seem to be aware of it. Nicolas Ventou is also charmed by her. And as he is wealthy, he does not hesitate to offer any tremendous gifts, like horse riding and an evening dress. However, Chen is indifferent with all the boys.
- Christian, is Cédric's best friend. He helps him in trying to obtain Chen's affections.
- Nicolas Ventou, is Cédric's rival and talks to Chen which makes Cédric jealous.
- Miss Nellie, is Cédric's teacher. She loves Cédric a lot, but whenever he hasn't read his lessons, she becomes very angry and she punishes him.
- Stephane, another of Cédric's schoolmate.
- Lily: She is a young girl who appears for the first time at the end of the twenty-second volume. Asthmatic, she is madly in love with Cédric.
- Yolanda, is Cédric's snooty and arrogant cousin. Her nickname is Yeti.
- Sophie, a friend of Chen.
- Laurent, a comrade of Cédric. His parents divorce in the episode The Divorce.
- Valerie, a friend of Chen.
- Adeline, a friend of Chen and the sister of Christian. She wears a hair ribbon and a pink T-shirt.
- Jean-Bernard, a student. He wears a flat orange cap.
- Julien, another student.
- Manu, a Middle Eastern friend of Cédric. He wears a flat red cap and a gray sweatshirt, and likes watching on television.
- Caligula, is Mrs. Bertrand's dog.
- Tiberius, is Nicolas' dog, who has a moustache.
- Aunt Martha, is Cédric's aunt.
- Caprice, an athletic and greatest African Caribbean who Christian has a crush on.
- Mr. Oliver, class' gym teacher.
- Mr. Seymour, school psychologist.

== Albums ==
1. Premieres classes 02/1989
2. Classes de neige 08/1989
3. Classe tous risques 05/1990
4. Papa a de la classe 03/1991
5. Quelle mouche le pique ? 02/1992
6. Chaud et froid 01/1993
7. Pépé se mouille 03/1994
8. Comme sur des roulettes 11/1994
9. Parasite sur canapé 10/1995
10. Gâteau-surprise 11/1996
11. Cygne d'étang 08/1997
12. Terrain minets 08/1998
13. Papa, je veux un cheval ! 08/1999
14. Au pied, j'ai dit ! 07/2000
15. Avis de tempête 07/2001
16. Où sont les freins ? 04/2002
17. Qui a éteint la lumière ? 11/2002
18. Enfin seuls ! 11/2003
19. On se calme ! 11/2004
20. J'ai fini ! 11/2005
21. On rêvasse? 11/2006
22. Elle est moche ! 03/2008
23. Je veux l'épouser ! 03/2009
24. J'ai gagné ! 03/2010
25. Qu'est-ce qu'il a ? (2011)
26. Graine de star (2012)
27. C'est quand qu'on part ? (2013)
28. Faux départ ! (2014)
29. Un look d'enfer ! (2015)
30. Silence, je tourne ! (2016)
31. Temps de chien ! (2017)
32. C'est pas du jeu ! (2018)
33. Sans les mains (2019)
34. Couché, sale bête ! (2021)
35. Trop tôt pour toi, gamin ! (2022)

== English translations ==
Cover to Isn't it Past Your Bedtime? (2021) with the original 1995 illustration

Cinebook has started publishing Cedric (without acute accent) since 2008. Seven albums have been released so far (original French album numbers in parentheses):

1. (3) High-Risk Class - Sep 2008 ISBN 978-1-905460-68-7
2. (4) Dad's Got Class - Sep 2009 ISBN 978-1-84918-003-0
3. (5) What Got Into Him? - May 2011 ISBN 978-1-84918-081-8
4. (6) Hot And Cold - May 2013 ISBN 978-1-84918-158-7
5. (7) Grandpa Dives In - June 2015 ISBN 978-1-84918-253-9
6. (8) Skating On Thin Ice - July 2018 ISBN 978-1-84918-408-3
7. (9) Isn't it Past Your Bedtime? - July 2021 ISBN 978-1-80044-025-8

== Animated series ==
In 2001, French television channel Canal J started broadcasting the animated series based loosely on the comics. The same series started 20 days later on France 3 as well, and returned in 2011 on France 5 (part of Zouzous). Until now, 104 episodes of 13 minutes each have been made, with 52 more to come. 12 DVDs have been produced so far.

In 2005, PorchLight Entertainment dubbed the series with English voices and released them to DVD through Genius Entertainment. Cédric was aired in Tamil language on Chutti TV and in Malayalam language on Kochu TV. In Canada, it was aired in Teletoon from January 8, 2002, to December 23, 2010, but the German version was aired on Super RTL as part of Toggo, then after Marsupilami or Totally Spies!, from November 3, 2002, to December 23, 2013. Also was aired in Mexico in Conaculta (canal 22) as part of the segment "Clic Clac", since 2011 to 2016.

=== Episodes ===
- The Pilot - Cédric's grades are falling down, and so he joins a music class, just to impress Chen and also go around the world with her.
- In Style - Cédric wants to fit in by styling himself. His idea of ear piercing though, could get him grounded!
- I Want to Marry Her - Cédric wants to marry Chen, and so he and Christian give her a cassette player.
- My Cousin Yolanda - Cédric's cousin Yolanda visits.
- Tiberius Versus Caligula - Nicolas is stealing Chen with his dog, and Cédric borrows his neighbor's mutt. It seems as though Nicolas and Cédric will have to compete to see whose dog is "best in show".

== Video games ==
- 2005 : Cédric : Chen is Lost!
- 2006 : Cédric : The Treasure Hunt
- 2008 : Cédric : Chen's Birthday (released on July 4, 2008)

== Books ==
From 2002 on, a series of 23 books about Cédric have appeared in French in the Bibliothèque rose.

== See also ==
- Franco-Belgian comics
