= Agent 212 =

Belgian comic book series

- Agent 212, Cover of the first album (1981)
- Author(s): Raoul Cauvin
- Illustrator(s): Daniel Kox
- Current status/schedule: Running
- Launch date: 1981
- Publisher(s): Dupuis
- Genre(s): Humor comics, Satire

Agent 212 is a humorous Belgian comic about a rotund police officer who usually suffers as a result of the people and situations he encounters. Created by writer Raoul Cauvin and illustrator Daniel Kox, the comic debuted in Spirou magazine on 12 June 1975. The first album of the series was published in 1981 by Belgian publishing house Dupuis. To date, 30 comic albums of Agent 212 have been published by Dupuis in French and Dutch. Agent 212 is among the best selling French comics, with 66,000 copies for the 25th album in 2006. The series is also popular in Indonesia.

== Structure ==
The Agent 212 albums are usually about 48 pages. Unlike other Franco-Belgian comic titles such as Tintin, Asterix and Lucky Luke, the Agent 212 albums do not comprise single stories spanning the length of the book. Instead, each album comprises a number of short and usually unrelated stories, ranging in length from one to five pages, though the lead story in Volume 4 spans 12 pages.

== Main characters ==
- Arthur Delfouille ("Agent 212"): His nickname is "Tutur". This well-meaning, overweight police officer yearns for tranquility but makes a lot of blunders, collecting bumps, bruises and reprimands in the course of his duties.
- Albert ("Agent 213"): Arthur's colleague and partner.
- Raoul Lebrun: The Police Commissioner. Ill-tempered and impatient, he is often enraged by Arthur's maladroitness. He sometimes punishes Arthur by assigning him to traffic police duties.
- Louise Delfouille: Arthur's wife. Caring and patient, she usually supports Arthur and defends him from her mother's criticism.
- Adrian: A police officer who is Arthur's friend.
- Arthur's mother-in-law: She has a low opinion of Arthur and is sometimes the victim of his vengeance. First appearance is in Volume 24, over pages 39–42, where she receives frightening anonymous phone calls from Arthur.
- Kiki: Arthur's pet chihuahua. First appearance is in Volume 25. Louise buys him to relieve the tedium of being a housewife. Arthur unwittingly squashes the dog and is later embarrassed by its small size, but they become firm friends after Kiki bites Arthur's mother-in-law.

== Antagonists ==
- Suicidal Man: An old man whose desperate attempts to kill himself are always foiled by Arthur. He is the main antagonist in Volume 1 and the most recurring antagonist of the series. In Volume 25, it is revealed that he used to be a policeman, which is why he regrets his life and wants to kill himself.
- Drunken Toff: A secondary recurring antagonist of the series. He is immaculately dressed in a top hat, tailcoat and bow tie, but his public inebriation leads to trouble with the police. Introduced in Volume 1 (pages 13–14), he crashes his car during a storm, enabling Arthur to hitch a ride in an ambulance.
- Thief: A major recurring antagonist, who often outsmarts Arthur. In Volume 18 (pages 24–26), he is briefly redeemed when he takes pity on a poor mother and child.
- Norbert: A man who is always ticketed by Arthur.
- Raymond: A lumberjack who is first defeated by Arthur in Volume 21.
- Pedro and Aldo: Assassins targeting a president, they are foiled by Arthur in Volume 4 in the longest story of the series.

== Albums ==
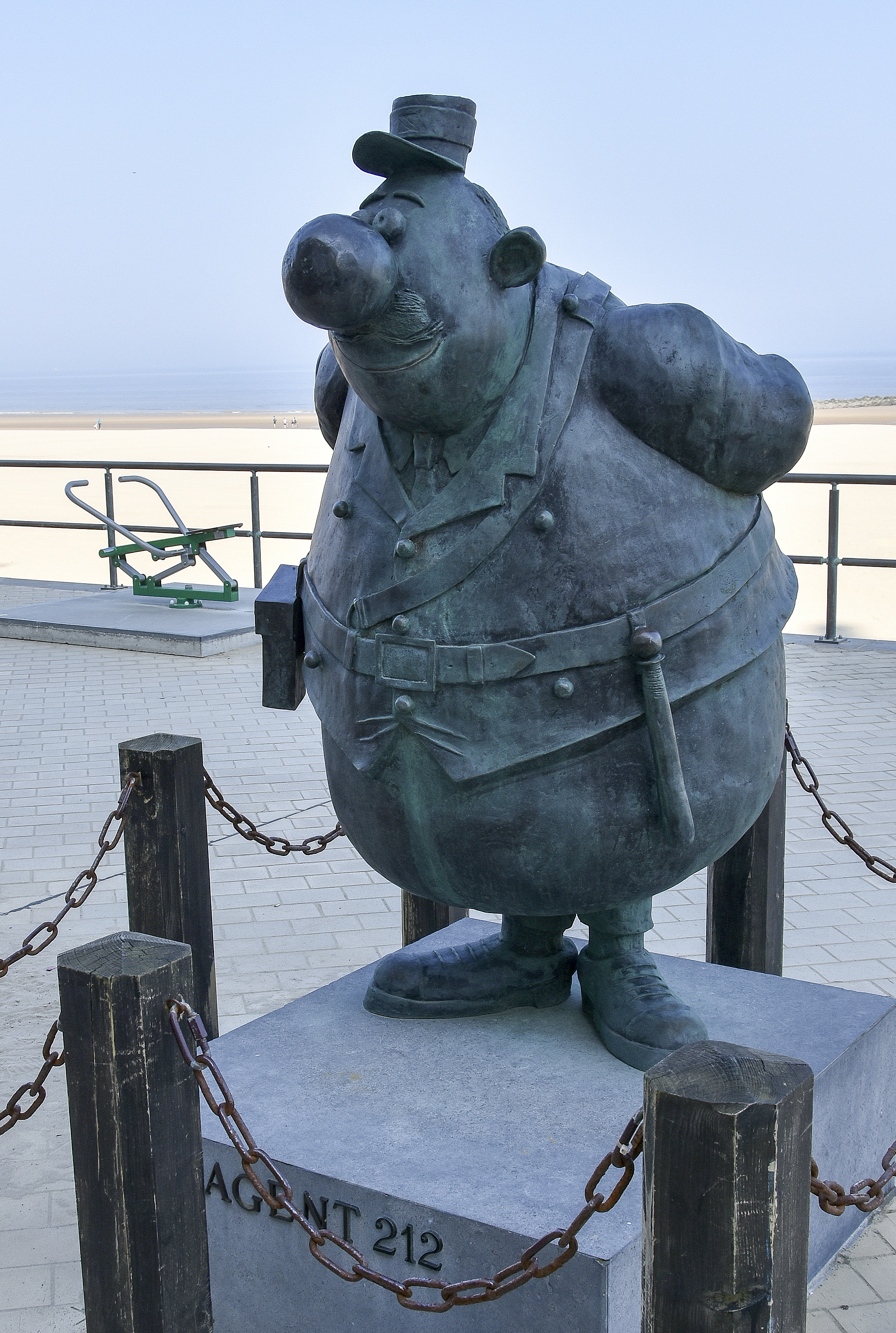
Statue in Middelkerke

- Volume 1 : 24 heures sur 24 (1981)
- Volume 2 : Au nom de la loi (1982)
- Volume 3 : Sens interdit (1983)
- Volume 4 : Voie sans issue (1984)
- Volume 5 : Poulet aux amendes (1985)
- Volume 6 : Ronde de nuit (1986)
- Volume 7 : Un flic à l'ombre (1987)
- Volume 8 : Pas de panique (1987)
- Volume 9 : Brigade mobile (1988)
- Volume 10 : Agent trouble (1988)
- Volume 11 : Sifflez dans le ballon! (1989)
- Volume 12 : Riz, ô poulet (1990)
- Volume 13 : Un flic flanche (1991)
- Volume 14 : Sauté de poulet (1992)
- Volume 15 : L'Appeau de l'ours (1993)
- Volume 16 : Flic… aïe! (1994)
- Volume 17 : Poulet sans selle (1995)
- Volume 18 : Poulet rôti (1996)
- Volume 19 : Cuisses de poulet (1997)
- Volume 20 : Chair de poule (1998)
- Volume 21 : Ailes de poulet (2000)
- Volume 22 : Brigade des eaux (2001)
- Volume 23 : Poulet en gelée (2003)
- Best Of : Volume 1 (2003)
- Volume 24 : Agent de poche (2004)
- Volume 25 : L'Agent prend la pose (2006)
- Volume 26 : À l'eau police (2007)
- Volume 27 : Fauve qui peut! (2009)
- Best of Special Animaux (2010)
- Best of Special Frayeurs (2011)
- Volume 28 : Effet monstre (2012)
- Best of Special Fetes (2013)
- Volume 29 : L'agent tous risques (2016)
- Volume 30 : Descente de police (2020)

== In Indonesian ==
The Agent 212 comics have been translated into Indonesian under the series title Agen Polisi 212. The first 16 albums were released in standard large format (11 x 8.3 inches) by now-defunct publishing company PT Midas Surya Grafindo (Misurind) from 1987 to 1995. In 2011, new Indonesian translations were commissioned by PT Bhuana Ilmu Populer (BIP, a unit of the Gramedia publishing group), which began releasing the entire series in a smaller format (8.6 x 6.2 inches).

== See also ==
• Belgian comics

• Franco-Belgian comics
