= Ot el bruixot =

Comic strip series

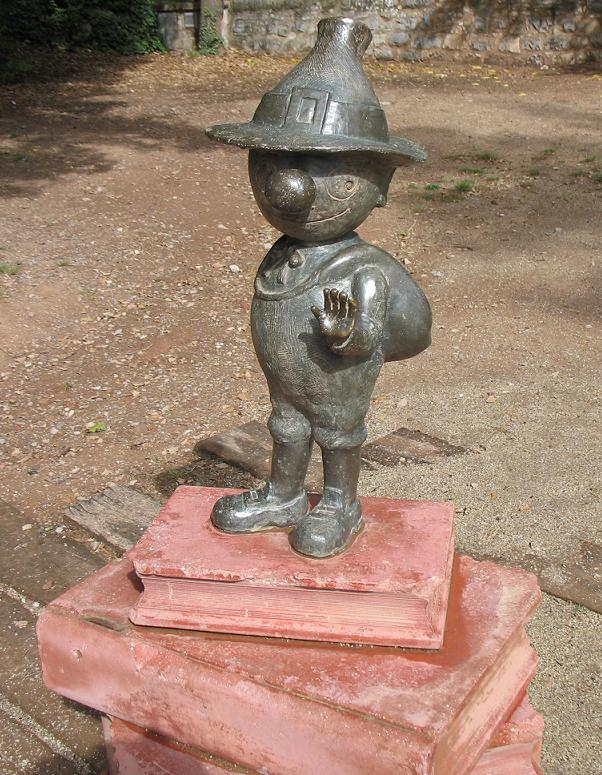
- Author(s): Picanyol
- Illustrator(s): Picanyol
- Alternate name(s): Ot el brujo (in Spanish); Ot the Warlock (in English)
- Genre(s): Children's
- Original language: Catalan

Ot el bruixot ([ɔt ɛl bɾuˈʃɔt], Catalan: Ot the Warlock) is a comic strip created by Picanyol in 1971 and is his most popular. It typically includes a one to five panels and a simple joke based on Ot's use of magic. Text only appears when the strip's characters can read it, or as an onomatopoeia, such as to show a spell has been cast.

== Plot and characters ==
The main character is Ot, a wizard dressed in black, who fixes problems with his magic. Sometimes, his magic serves to help others, but it is often used instead to prank other people, especially characters who are rich, strong, or powerful.

Other recurring characters include:

- The owl: typically an observer of the comic's goings-on, but sometimes the butt of Ot's pranks.
- Berta: Ot's wife, she is egocentric and temperamental and is always demanding he do things for her. She often ends up chasing him with a broom to hit him over the head with. She has no powers.
- A policeman: he often chases Ot because of his tricks, but never catches him.
- The thief: he often tries to steal something from Ot's house or from another place, but Ot or his wife are always there to stop him.
- The castaway: he is always on a tiny island wishing for something, which Ot gives him as he flies by on his broom.

Many of the characters dress in an antiquated manner, but references to the modern world often appear. These do not have to be considered as anachronisms if one considers that Ot has the ability to time travel.

== History ==
The character Ot appeared for the first time in the double number 215/216 of Cavall Fort, a Catalan-language children's magazine, in 1971. The strip appeared consistently in the magazine until Picanyol's retirement.

In celebration of the 40-year anniversary of the character in 2009, Norma Editorial published the first of three volumes of the strip's comics as a collection. The publishers continued to publish volumes through 2011, with the intention of collecting all the comic strips of Ot.

In 2014, after 42 years, Picanyol decided to retire from drawing Ot el bruixot.

== The stories of Ot el bruixot ==
Other stories featuring Ot include a number of collections published by the Editorial Pirene in both Catalan and Spanish, as well as a collection called Ot, el bruixot published by the Editorial La Galera.

Edicions Baula has also published non-comedic children's stories in Catalan, with Ot as the protagonist :

- La capa màgica de l'Ot ("Ot's Magic Cape");
- L'Ot i la pluja ("Ot and the Rain");
- L'Ot llegeix un conte ("Ot Reads a Story");
- El drac de l'Ot ("Ot's Dragon");
- L'Ot fa una broma ("Ot Makes a Joke");
- El borinot ("The Bumblebee").

== Other adaptations ==
Ot has been adapted into a puppet, and was also the protagonist of "Otijocs", a computer game produced by Multimedia Barcelona.

In the municipality of Moià, the hometown of Picanyol, there is a statue of Ot.
