= Cupidon (comics) =

Belgian comic series

- Cupidon
- Author(s): Malik, Raoul Cauvin
- Illustrator(s): Malik
- Current status/schedule: Discontinued
- Launch date: 1988
- End date: 2014
- Publisher(s): Dupuis, Joker, Le Fourbe Chinois
- Genre(s): Adventure, Fantasy

Cupidon is a Belgian comics series written by Raoul Cauvin and drawn by Malik.

== Publication history ==
Cupidon made its debut in the Franco-Belgian comics magazine Spirou on October 5, 1988. To date 19 albums have been published by Dupuis.

== Synopsis ==
Cupidon features short stories about the adventures of a little Putto attempting to bring love on earth. His headquarters are in Heaven and he is dispatched by a (hot-tempered) Saint Peter.

With his bow and arrows, Cupidon is usually prone to blunders, bringing together people of contrasting personalities, even matching together animals not necessarily of the same species.

== Albums ==
Cover of Solitude (2007)

1. Premières flèches, 1990
2. Philtre d'amour, 1991
3. Baiser de feu, 1991
4. Souffle au cœur, 1992
5. Arc en ciel, 1993
6. L'Ange et l'eau, 1994
7. Un amour de gorille, 1995
8. Je l'aime un peu..., 1996
9. Vive la mariée, 1997
10. Coup de foudre, 1998
11. Lune de miel, 1999
12. Le Cœur dans les nuages, 2000
13. Jour de chance, 2001
14. Toutes les amours du monde, 2002
15. Plus jamais seul, 2003
16. Cadeau du ciel, 2004
17. Amour en cage, 2005
18. Rien que pour vous!, 2006
19. Solitude, 2007
20. Elles et Moi, 2008
21. Le Nœud du Problème, 2009
22. Une copine pour Cupidon, 2012
23. Fous d'Ailes, 2014

== See also ==
• Marcinelle school

== Sources ==
- Cupidon publications in Spirou BDoubliées (in French)
- Cupidon albums Bedetheque (in French)
