= Pierre Tombal =

Belgian comic strip (1963–2017)

- Main character with the series logo
- Author: Raoul Cauvin
- Illustrator: Marc Hardy
- Current status/schedule: Running
- Launch date: 1981
- Publisher: Dupuis
- Genre(s): Humor comics, Satire
- Original language: French

Pierre Tombal is a Belgian gag comic strip, drawn by Marc Hardy and written by Raoul Cauvin, about a gravedigger and the dead people at his cemetery. The series has been in syndication since 1983 and is published in the Belgian magazine Spirou by Dupuis.

== Synopsis ==
Pierre Tombal centers around an undertaker, Pierre Tombal (a pun on pierre tombale, gravestone in French), who owns a cemetery. He is able to talk to the dead people in his graveyard, which often freaks out visitors, especially when the corpses talk or react back. Pierre functions as a spokesperson, servant, aid and trustworthy guard on benefit of the people who are buried there. Many black comedy jokes are about the various ways his customers died or how they spent their daily lives at the graveyard. A running gag is Pierre's rivalry with the proprietor of a crematory and a captain who favors burial at sea. The Grim Reaper is also a recurring character.

== Other languages ==
In Dutch the series is published under the name G. Raf Zerk. In Spanish as Pedro Tumbas. In Indonesian as Tombal.In Greek as Πιέρ το Κοράκι.

== List of albums ==
- 1 : Les 44 premiers trous, 1986 (ISBN 978-2-8001-1323-4).
- 2 : Histoires d'os, 1986 (ISBN 978-2-8001-1413-2).
- 3 : Morts aux dents, 1987 (ISBN 978-2-8001-1492-7).
- 4 : Des os pilants, 1987 (ISBN 978-2-277-33255-8).
- 5 : Ô suaires, 1988 (ISBN 978-2-8001-1613-6).
- 6 : Côte à l'os, 1989 (ISBN 978-2-8001-1655-6).
- 7 : Cas d'os surprise, 1990 (ISBN 978-2-8001-1741-6).
- 8 : Trou dans la couche d'os jaunes, 1991 (ISBN 978-2-8001-1828-4).
- 9 : Voyage de n'os, 1992 (ISBN 978-2-8001-1937-3).
- 10 : Dégâts des os, 1993 (ISBN 978-2-8001-2003-4).
- 11 : La défense des os primés, 1994 (ISBN 978-2-8001-2098-0).
- 12 : Os Courent, 1995 (ISBN 978-2-8001-2196-3).
- 13 : La pelle aux morts, 1996 (ISBN 978-2-8001-2313-4).
- 14 : Des Décédés et des dés, 1997 (ISBN 978-2-8001-2427-8).
- 15 : Chute d'os, 1997 (ISBN 978-2-8001-2560-2).
- 16 : Tombe, la neige, 1998 (ISBN 978-2-8001-2646-3).
- 17 : Devinez qui on enterre demain ?, 1999 (ISBN 978-2-8001-2784-2).
- 18 : Condamné à perpète, 2000 (ISBN 978-2-8001-2945-7).
- 19 : Squelettes en fête, 2001 (ISBN 978-2-8001-3112-2).
- 20 : Morts de rire, 2002 (ISBN 978-2-8001-3260-0).

H.S. Best Of, Tome 1, 2003 (ISBN 978-2-8001-3203-7).

- 21 : K.os, 2003 (ISBN 978-2-8001-3355-3).
- 22 : Ne jouez pas avec la mort !, 2005 (ISBN 978-2-8001-3513-7).
- 23 : Regrets éternels, 2006 (ISBN 978-2-8001-3776-6.
- 24 : On s'éclate mortels, 2007 (ISBN 978-2-8001-3946-3).
- 25 : Mise en orbite, 2008 (ISBN 2-8001-3203-5)
- 26 : Pompes funèbres, 2009 (ISBN 9782800144658).
- 27 : Entre la vie et la mort, 2011 (ISBN 9782800147550).
- 28 : L'amour est dans le cimetière, 2012 (ISBN 9782800151557).
- 29 : Des os et des bas, 5 avril 2013 (ISBN 9782800152196).
- 30 : Questions de vie ou de mort, 2014 (ISBN 9782800159652).
- 31 : Peine de mort, 2015 (ISBN 9782800162591).
- 32 : Fin de bail au cimetière, 2016 (ISBN 9782800165868).

== See also ==
• Marcinelle school

• Belgian comics

• Franco-Belgian comics
