= Picanyol =

Spanish cartoonist (1948–2021)

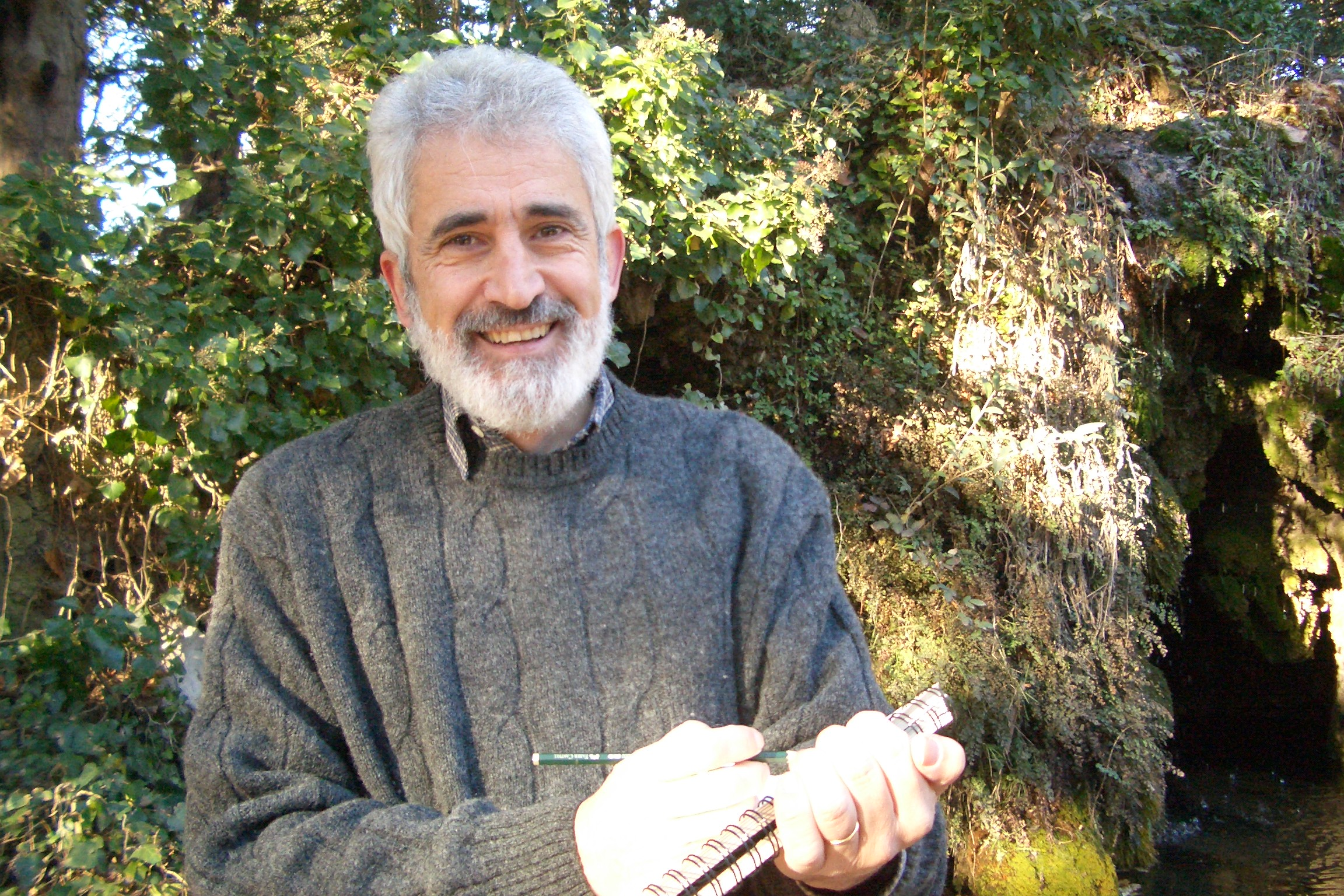
- Picanyol in 2006
- Born: Josep Lluís Martínez i Picañol; 16 March 1948 Moià, Catalonia, Spain
- Died: 18 March 2021 (aged 73) Moià, Catalonia, Spain
- Area: Cartoonist
- Pseudonym: Picanyol
- Notable works: Ot el bruixot

Josep Lluís Martínez i Picañol (16 March 1948 – 18 March 2021), known by the pen name Picanyol [piˈkaɲɔl], was a Spanish self-taught comic artist. His best known creation is the warlock Ot el bruixot.

== Career ==
Picanyol's professional career began during the 1960s under the direction of Josep Toutain, editor-in-chief of Barcelona S.I. Artists, an agency in part responsible for the resurgence of the comic industry in Catalonia and the introduction of the Franco-Belgian school in Spain. Early in his career, he strived toward a realistic style, writing Western and adventure comics; his attempts were largely unsuccessful as he struggled to find any publisher. It was in the early 70s when he changed to a more humorous style, which accompanied him for the rest of his career. In his own words, writing humor allowed him to produce more genuine, relatable and personal work.

During the 1970s, Picanyol began working for magazines such as Mata Ratos and L'Infantil (later Tretzevents), generally drawing comic strips while experimenting with characters, style and tone. As his popularity grew during the 1980s, he began working for more popular magazines such as Lecturas in 1981 and Mussol in 1982, the later belonging to Norma Editorial. In collaboration with Editorial Barcanova and Editorial Galera he also created several children's books including Picajocs in 1991, the La Rata Sàvia series starting in 1996, L'aligot savi in 2000 and El gripau saberut in 2003. He worked briefly in television, collaborating with the Catalan circuit of TVE2 between 1983 and 1986. His most well known partnership was with the magazine Cavall Fort, which saw the first appearance of Ot (double issue 215/216 in 1971). For 43 years, Ot was a staple of Cavall Fort with an uninterrupted run of 1,500 issues until Picanyol's retirement in 2014.

From the second half of 2005 until 2006, a creative crisis made Picanyol refocus his career and begin writing an autobiography. The text was later published by Editorial Barcanova under the title Històries d'una pensió. Preus barats i plats plens. The book focuses on his experience living on his mother's pension during the 1950s.

In 2010 he participated in a TV3 program to provide illustrations to a videoclip for the song Puff, el drac màgic by Falsterbo.

Beginning in 2019, Edicions del Pirata collected Picanyol's books for children, re-editing them in the series Memòria d'Elefant, and six volumes have been published.

During the 2010s, Picanyol became interested in the Gospel and, in collaboration with writer Toni Matas, began working on La Bíblia dels nens, a comic about the teaching of Jesus of Nazareth aimed at children. The book was published by Barcelona Multimèdia in 2011 and quickly proved successful, being published in Italy, the United States, Poland, France, Germany, Norway, Brazil, Portugal, Greece, Croatia, India, Australia, Netherlands, Slovenia and Russia. Consequently, it was expanded into a series and a multi-platform project involving mobile apps. Five more books have been published about the Parables, Francis of Assisi, Ignatius of Loyola and the Psalms.

in his later career he focused on ludo-didactic content and created several books including El gran llibre de les set diferències in 2016, similar in concept to Where's Wally? with a tale attached to each drawing, and Ot el bruixot i les dites dels mesos in 2017, to teach Catalan sayings to children. In addition, several of his early comics have been re-edited in bilingual Catalan–English editions. Some examples are Ot the Wizard and the dragon, Ot the Wizard and the magic cloak, and Ot the Wizard reads a story.

== Characters ==
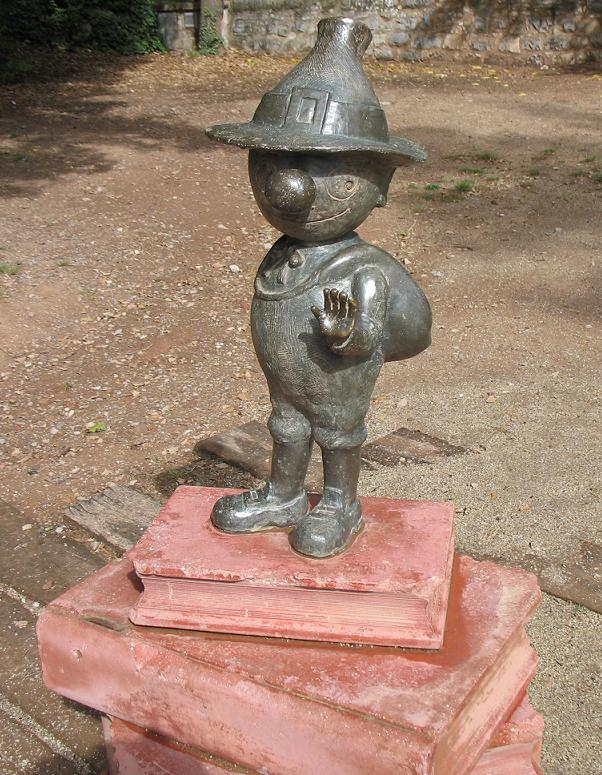
Statue of Ot el bruixot in Moià

In addition to Ot el Bruixot, Picanyol created several characters across different publications and platforms. Some examples are:

- Nuria y su familia i Miss Lucy (Nuria and her family and Miss Lucy) in the magazine Lecturas 1990–1993, Zipi y Zape 1993–1994, and L'Avui dels Súpers 1994–1995.
- La família Moixó (The Moixó family) in the magazine Catalunya Cristiana.
- Les Filles del Joglar (The Minstrel's Daughters), for the magazine Barbie.
- Sopars de duro (Nickel Suppers), for Cavall Fort 1987–2003, and in Otijocs.
- Els mims (The mimes), in Catalunya Exprés (1979–1980).
- El trobador (The troubadour) in Matarratos 1969–1970.
- Alabí, in Tretzevents (1976–1977).
- La Noemí i el pilot (Noemi and the pilot), in Barbie (1988–1989), Picajocs, and Otijocs (from 1996).
- L'illa perduda (The lost island), in Suplement de l'Avui (1983–1987).
- El doctor Pots i els seus ajudants (Doctor Pots and his assistants), in Otijocs (from 1996).

Beginning in 1996, the software company Barcelona Multimèdia created several video games involving Ot and Noemí i el pilot, they were distributed in several CD-ROM commonly called "Otijocs" (a Catalan portmanteau for Ot-and-games). More recently, in 2014 several of those games were ported to mobile devices along with additional educational games involving the New Testament.

Some of his characters have been used to promote reading among children in the program Llegir per Sentir of Vilafranca del Penedès and the Valencia Book Fair.

== Personal life and death ==
Picanyol was born on 16 March 1948 in Catalonia, Spain. He described himself as being from Moià. He died on 18 March 2021, two days after his 73rd birthday.
