= Lambil =

Belgian comics artist

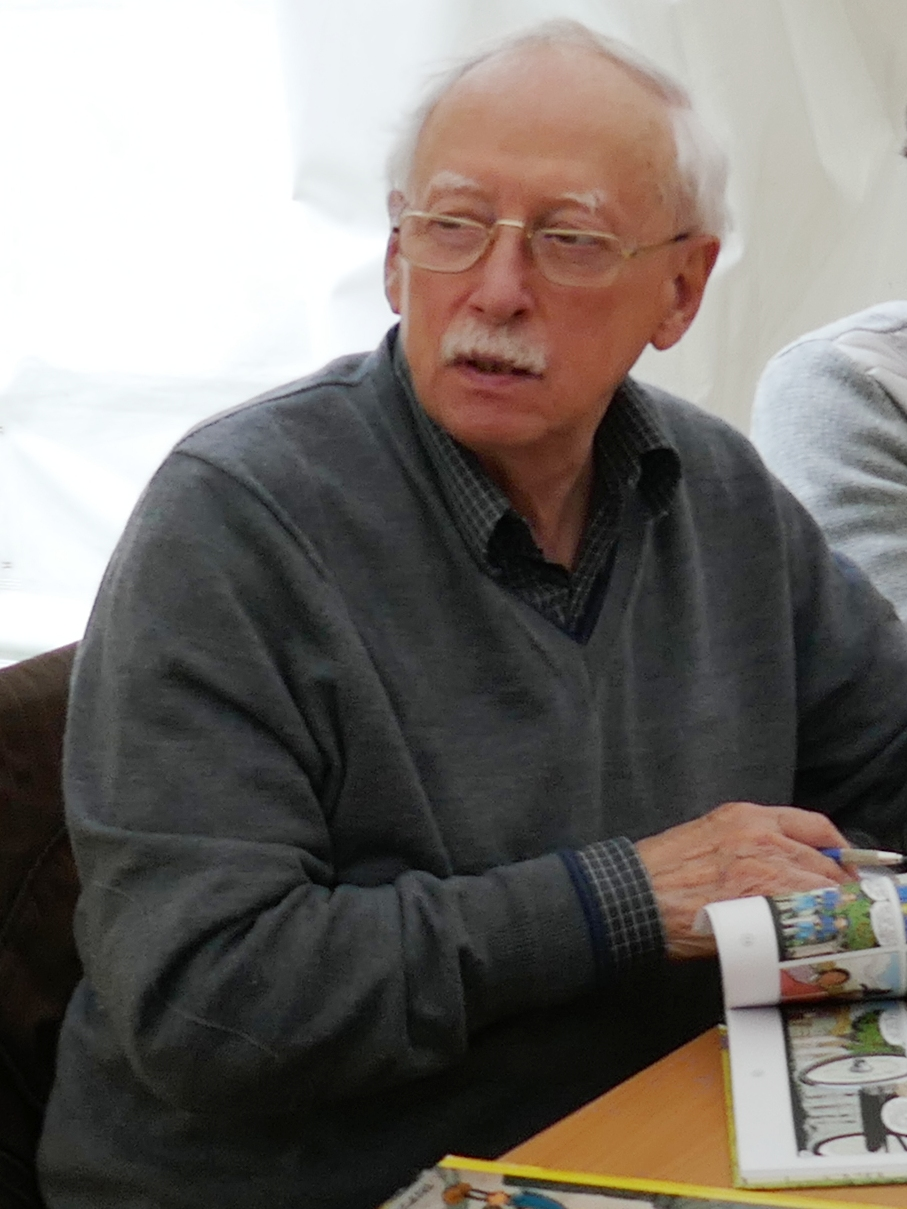
- Born: Willy Lambillotte; 14 May 1936 (age 90) Tamines, Belgium
- Areas: artist, writer
- Notable works: Les Tuniques Bleues
- Awards: Grand Prix Saint-Michel 2006

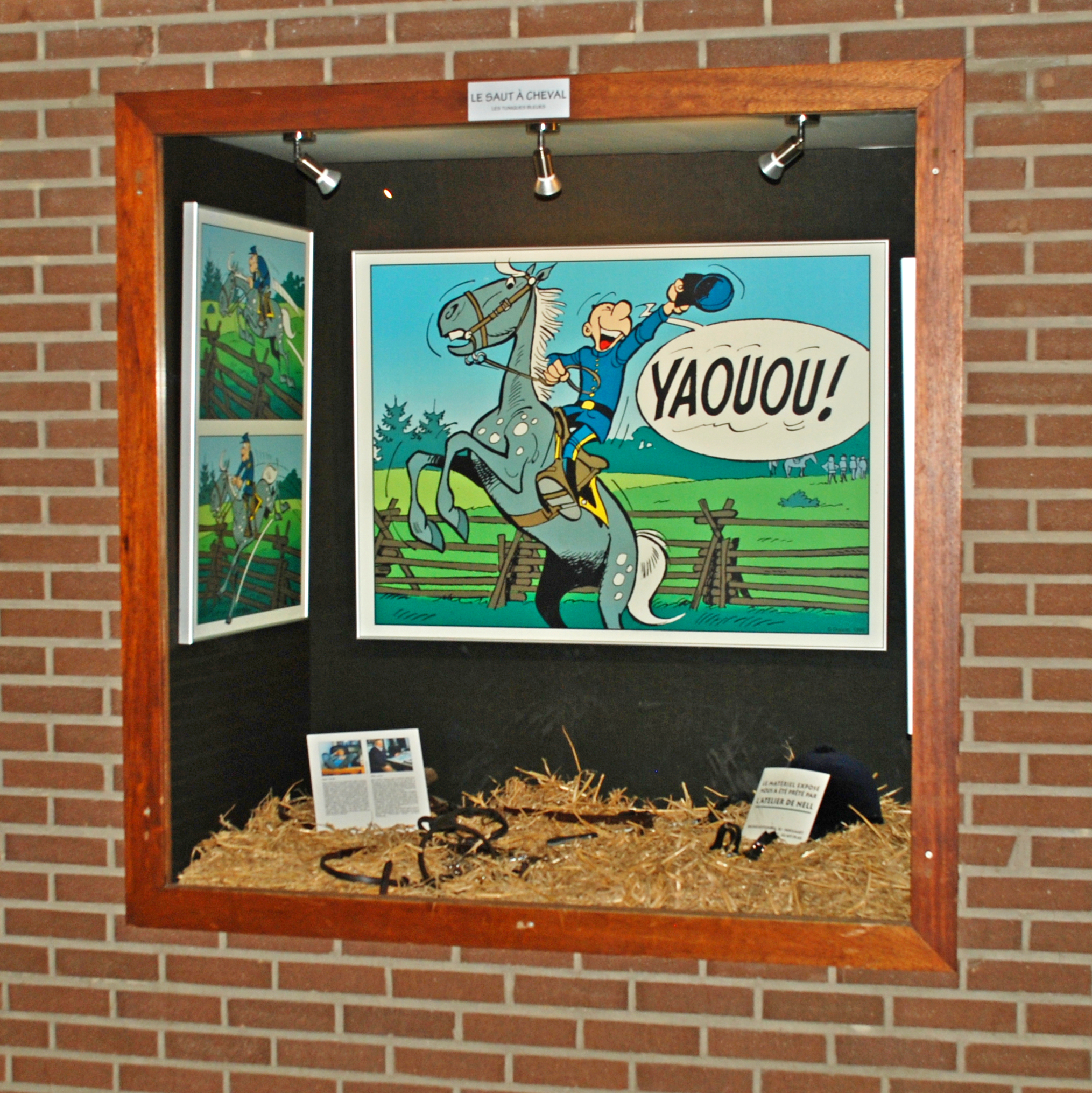
Corporal Blutch.

Lambil (born 14 May 1936) is a Belgian comic-book artist, best known for the series Les Tuniques Bleues, which has been published in English as "The Blue Tunics" and "The Bluecoats".

== Biography ==
Willy Lambillotte was born in Tamines, Belgium in 1936. He studied at the Académie Royale des Beaux-Arts in Brussels and first presented his drawings to the publisher Dupuis, known for Spirou magazine, when he was 16. He was accepted as a letterer, and got to know the major artists of the magazine of the time, such as Jijé and André Franquin.

In 1959, he published his first comic, Sandy, about an Australian teenager and his kangaroo Hoppy. The story was written by Henri Gillain, the brother of Jijé, and was the first of more than 20 stories in the same series, which only had moderate success and did not get published until much later. Lambil even parodied his own series in the irregular talking animal comic Hobby and Koala, about a kangaroo and a koala, and as Panty et son kangarou (see below).

When in 1972 Louis Salvérius, the artist of Les Tuniques Bleues ("The Blue Coats"), unexpectedly died, a successor was sought amongst the Dupuis artists. Lambil was asked to continue the series in collaboration with writer Raoul Cauvin. Whereas Sandy was drawn in a realistic style, Les Tuniques Bleues was comical and humorous, even though it is set during the American Civil War and is rather graphic in its portrayal of battle and its aftermath. Due to the rapid success of Les Tuniques Bleues (which became a major best-selling series), Lambil had to drop Sandy.

As of 2009, Lambil has made more than 40 albums of Les Tuniques Bleues, which have sold over 15 million copies.

His only other major contribution was Pauvre Lampil ("Poor Lampil"), a series of short humoristic semi-autobiographic stories, satirizing the hard life of a comics artist and his writing partner – caricatures of Lambil and Cauvin themselves – as they argue about almost everything, from work to life in general. The strip is also a domestic one in the style of Blondie, with the ever-depressed Lampil having to put up with everything life throws at him, which is not helped by the more cheery dispositions of his wife and their son Joel. The strip also features caricatures of other comics artists, such as André Franquin and Jean-Claude Fournier. In his early appearances, Lampil's comic strip is described as Panty et son kangourou ("Panty and his Kangaroo") which only had moderate success, but later ones saw him and Cauvin actually working on Les Tuniques Bleues.

== Bibliography ==
| Series | Years | Volumes | Writer | Editor | Remarks |
|---|---|---|---|---|---|
| Sandy et Hoppy | 1972–1981 | 18 | Lambil | Dupuis and Magic-Strip | Originally started in Spirou in 1959 |
| Les Tuniques Bleues | 1974- | 44 | Raoul Cauvin | Dupuis | The first six stories were drawn by Salverius |
| Pauvre Lampil | 1977–1995 | 7 | Raoul Cauvin | Dupuis | Lambil and Cauvin satirise themselves; Lambil's name is changed to "Lampil", but curiously Cauvin and other writers and artists are still referred to by their real names. |

== Awards ==
- 2004: Prix Géant de la BD by the Chambre Belge des Experts en Bande Dessinée
- 2006: Grand Prix Saint-Michel, Brussels, Belgium

== Sources ==
- Béra, Michel; Denni, Michel; and Mellot, Philippe (2002): "Trésors de la Bande Dessinée 2003–2004". Paris, Les éditions de l'amateur. ISBN 2-85917-357-9
