= Les Tuniques Bleues =

Belgian comic series

The Bluecoats Les Tuniques Bleues
- The two main characters: Sergeant Cornelius Chesterfield and Corporal Blutch

Publication information
- Publisher: Dupuis (French and Dutch); Cinebook (English)
- Format: Ongoing series
- No. of issues: 68 (in French); 17 (in English)
- Main character(s): Sergeant Cornelius Chesterfield & Corporal Blutch

Creative team
- Created by: Raoul Cauvin & Louis Salverius
- Written by: Raoul Cauvin
- Artist(s): Willy Lambillotte

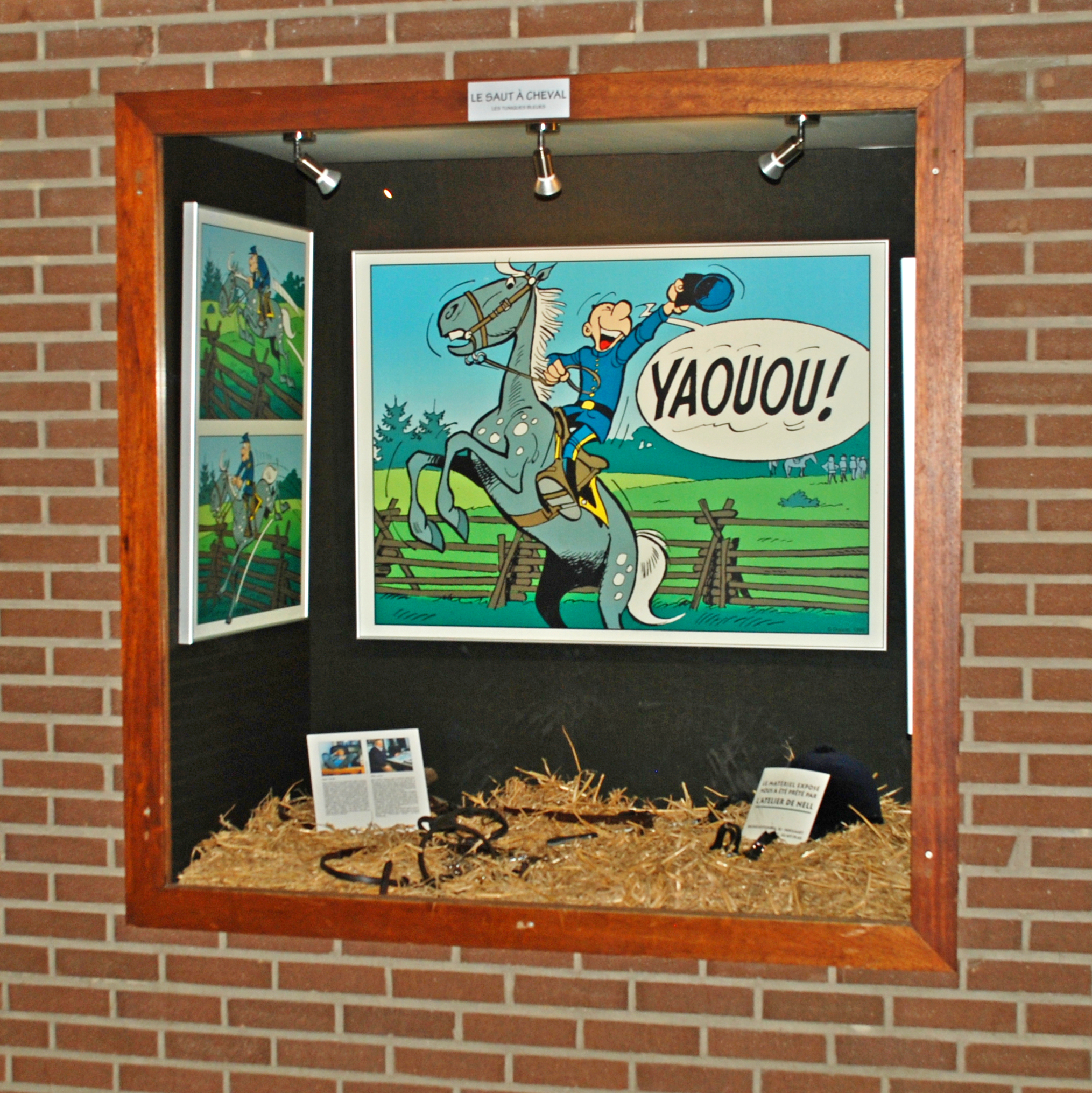
Corporal Blutch.

Les Tuniques Bleues (Dutch: De Blauwbloezen) is a Belgian series of bandes dessinées (comic books in the Franco-Belgian tradition), first published in Spirou magazine and later collected in albums by Dupuis. Created by artist Louis Salvérius and writer Raoul Cauvin, the series was taken up by artist Lambil after Salverius' death. It follows two United States Army cavalrymen through a series of battles and adventures. The first album of the series was published in 1970. The series' name, Les Tuniques Bleues, literally "the bluecoats", refers to the uniforms of the Union Army during the American Civil War. Cinebook has started to print the comics in English as "The Bluecoats", releasing Robertsonville Prison in 2008. It is one of the best-selling series in French-language comics.

== History ==
Cauvin has written the stories for the first 64 volumes. Six of the first ten volumes were illustrated by Louis Salverius, with Lambil taking over after Salverius' death.

The first book, Un chariot dans l'Ouest (French for “A Wagon in the West”), was published in 1972. Cauvin retired from writing the series in 2020, with the reins being taken over by Jose Luis Munuera and the BeKa writing partnership. Their first album L'envoyé spécial (“The Special Correspondent”) is published out of sequence in 2020, as volume 65, while the final album by Cauvin and Lambil is released the following year as volume 64, titled Où est donc Arabesque ? (“Where is Arabesque?”).

The stories appear first in Spirou, before being published as an album. The French editions are published by Dupuis. New albums are among the top ten best selling comics in French each year, with 184,800 copies for the 50th album alone in 2006. Les Tuniques Bleues spawned a 1989 computer game called North and South.

== Plot ==
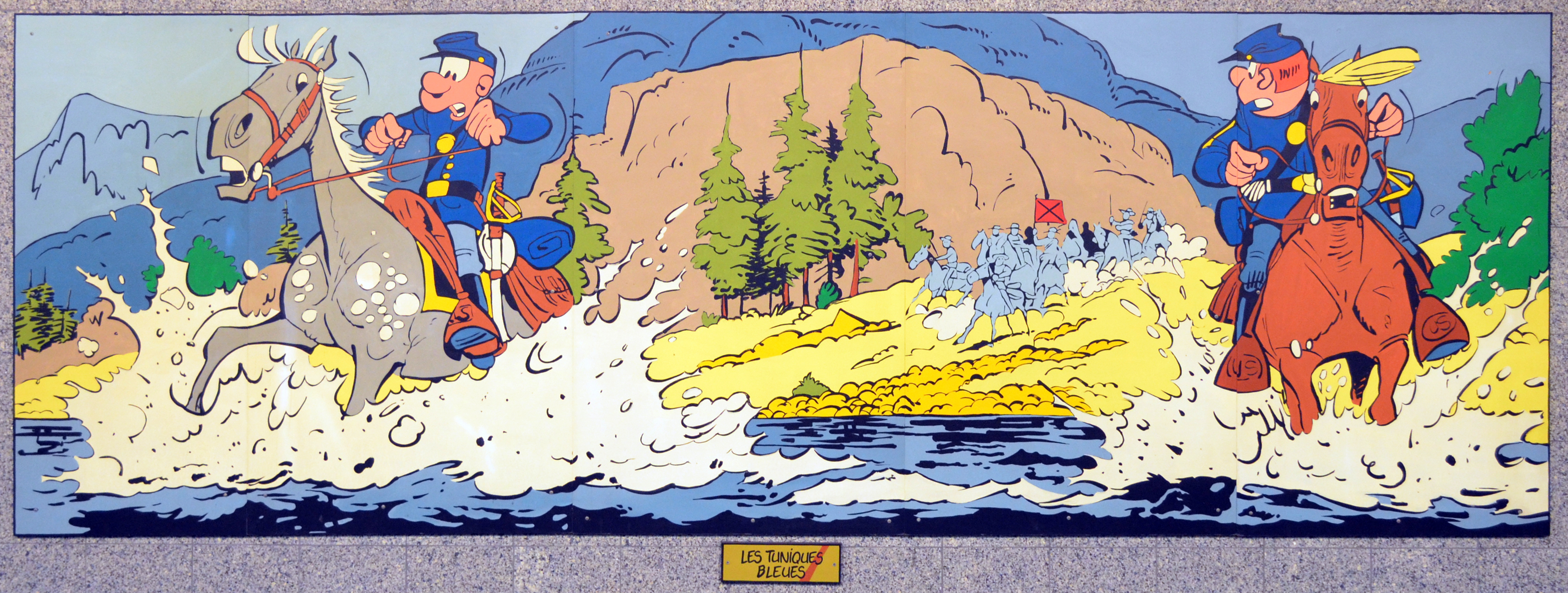
A scene showing the two main characters.

The original setting was the frontier of the Old West, where the main characters were American cavalrymen. Those stories, rarely longer than a single page, were comedic adventures about popular Western stereotypes and the absurdity of military life. One recurring feature was the blunder that led to the Cavalry fort being besieged by outraged Native Americans, or in one case, the cavalry having to besiege their own fort after the Indians have tricked them into leaving it and taken over. As the series progressed, the stories became longer and more involved, retaining their humorous highlights. The drawing style also changed, after the death of the original artist Salverius, from overtly cartoonish to semi-realistic.

In the second album, Du Nord au Sud, the main characters, Blutch and Chesterfield, travel east to join Ulysses S. Grant's army and fight in the American Civil War. The 18th album, Blue Retro, describes how the characters were first drafted into the military when the war had already begun and makes no mention of the time they spent on the frontier, contradicting the events in album 2 and others. This retconned origin and continuity hiccups are not detrimental to the enjoyment and understanding of the series since each album is a stand-alone adventure or collection of short stories. Adventures at the frontier fort still occasionally take place.

The two main protagonists are colorful and clashing opposites. Corporal Blutch is a reluctant soldier, highly critical of authority, whose only wish is to get out of the army and return to civilian life, often threatening to desert and coming up with ways to avoid going into yet another senseless battle. Blutch does have a heroic side and will not hesitate to fight against the Confederate troops even to the risk of his own life. Sergeant Cornelius Chesterfield is by contrast a devoted and obedient career soldier, always determined that he and Blutch should be in the thick of the action. He is proud of his scars and dreams of military glory. Though strong and brave to the point of recklessness, he is clumsy and narrow-minded, unable to clearly perceive the madness of the war around him. Though their relationship is often antagonistic, they are comrades for life and have saved each other's lives many times in spite of repeated threats made by both of doing the other in.

Other recurring characters include the somewhat insane, charge-obsessed Captain Stark and the bumbling general staff, headed by the anger-prone General Alexander. Historic figures are also occasionally present in the narrative: alongside General Grant, they include President Abraham Lincoln, Confederate commander Robert E. Lee, and war photographer Mathew Brady. As happens in fiction, especially in bandes dessinées, Blutch and Chesterfield often get sent on special missions which take them all over the map, from Mexico to Canada, and mix them up in projects from railroad construction to spying on the Confederacy's secret submarine project (based on the actual CSS David). Many albums are built around historical events or characters such as Chinese immigrant labor, the treatment of African American soldiers, Charleston's submarines, and General Lee's horse Traveller. Chesterfield even goes undercover to confront guerrilla leader William Quantrill and his henchmen Jesse and Frank James. On another occasion they had to contend with a racist officer, Captain Nepel, based on the French politician Jean-Marie Le Pen.

Historical details are generally quite exact, and accuracy has steadily improved over the years. Yet the series is first and foremost entertainment and historic details are altered to suit the story. The serious drama of the plots is balanced by frequent humorous incidents and Blutch's constant sarcastic wisecracks. Although this is not strictly speaking an adult-oriented bande dessinée, the authors are not afraid of showing the reality of war in a harsh, but tactful manner, such as dead bodies in the aftermath of a battle. Military authority, especially the uncaring and/or incompetent leader is often the subject of parody and derision.

== Les Bleus de la marine ==
Navy Blues (French: Les Bleus de la marine) is the seventh album in Les Tuniques Bleues comic series by Willy Lambil and Raoul Cauvin. It was published for the first time at No. 1904 and No. 1917 in Spirou magazine, afterwards as an album in 1975. The plot is based around the Battle of Hampton Roads in 1862.

=== Plot ===
After a battle between the Confederate and Union Army's goes awry for the Northerners, even with a near suicidal cavalry charge from the 22nd cavalry regiment. Corporal Blutch and Sergeant Chesterfield are dismissed by Captain Stark for cowardice and insubordination respectively. Afterwards, both men are first reassigned to the infantry regiment where they attack a Confederate barrier too early, which gets them dismissed again. Next, they are reassigned to the artillery regiment, where they operate their own cannon. They end up getting dismissed from this regiment as well when they fire upon their own trenches. After that, they become stretch-bearers and are warned if they fail again, there would not be any place anymore for them in the army. They end up being dismissed a final time when they bring back a wounded Confederate soldier from the battlefield to the field hospital. As a final solution, Corporal Blutch and Sergeant Chesterfield are reassigned to the Navy as sailors on a sailing ship, which ends up sinking in battle with the Confederates. Following the sinking, both men are transferred to the USS Monitor and see action during the Battle of Hampton Roads against the Confederate ironclad CSS Virginia. The battle ends in a draw, bringing back glory to Corporal Blutch and Sergeant Chesterfield. As a reward, they are reassigned back to the 22nd Cavalry regiment, although a lack of manpower following one of Stark's infamous suicide charges could've also been the reason for the transfer, as both men are experienced cavalrymen.

== Albums ==
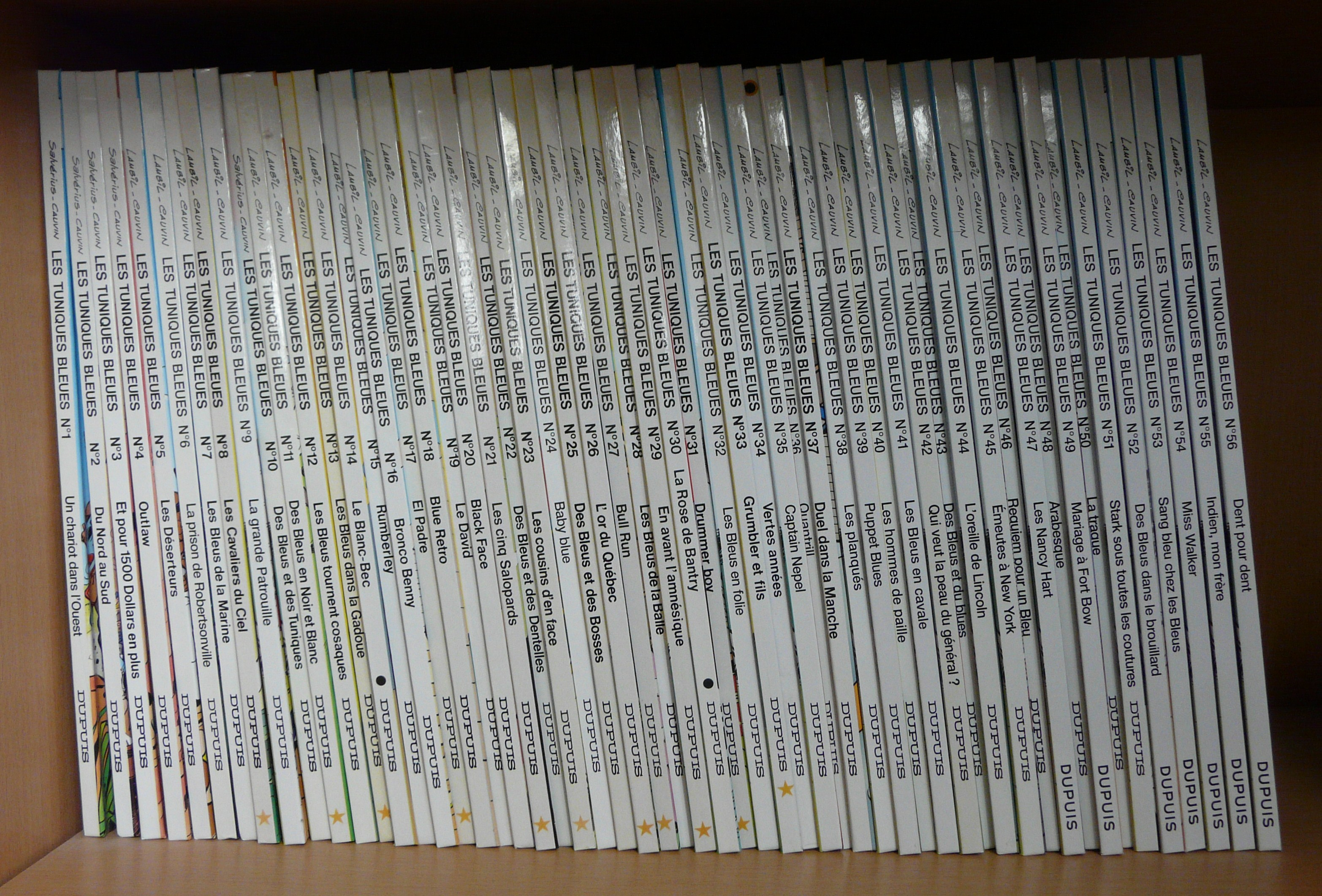
''Les Tuniques bleues'' comic collection, numbers 1 to 56.

1. Un chariot dans l'Ouest
2. Du Nord au Sud
3. Et pour 1500 dollars en plus
4. Outlaw
5. Les déserteurs
6. La prison de Robertsonville
7. Les Bleus de la marine
8. Les cavaliers du ciel
9. La grande patrouille
10. Des Bleus et des tuniques
11. Des Bleus en Noir et Blanc
12. Les Bleus tournent cosaques
13. Les Bleus dans la gadoue
14. Le blanc-bec
15. Rumberley
16. Bronco Benny
17. El Padre
18. Blue rétro
19. Le David
20. Black Face
21. Les cinq salopards
22. Des Bleus et des dentelles
23. Les cousins d'en face
24. Baby blue
25. Des Bleus et des bosses
26. L'or du Quebec
27. Bull Run
28. Les Bleus de la balle
29. En avant l'amnésique!
30. La Rose de Bantry
31. Drummer boy
32. Les Bleus en folie
33. Grumbler et fils
34. Vertes années
35. Captain Nepel
36. Quantrill
37. Duel dans la manche
38. Les planqués
39. Puppet Blues
40. Les hommes de paille
41. Les Bleus en cavale
42. Qui veut la peau du Général?
43. Des Bleus et du Blues
44. L'oreille de Lincoln
45. Emeutes à New York
46. Requiem pour un Bleu
47. Les nancy hart
48. Arabesque
49. Marriage à fort Bow
50. La traque
51. Stark sous toutes les coutures
52. Des bleus dans le brouillard
53. Sang bleu chez les Bleus
54. Miss Walker
55. Indien, mon frère
56. Dent pour dent
57. Colorado Story
58. Les bleues se mettes au vert
59. Les quatre évangélistes
60. Carte blanche pour un Bleu
61. L'étrange soldat Franklin
62. Sallie
63. La bataille du Cratère
64. Où est Arabesque ?
65. L'envoyé spécial
66. Irish Melody
67. Du Feu sur la glace

== Historical correlations ==
Several albums highlight historical facts of the American Civil War, other adventures are set in a place or anonymous battle. Some accounts tell of an encounter with a Native American tribe without any relation to the American Civil War. However, the chronology of the albums does not follow that of the war, but several albums are in flashback, tracing the past of the two protagonists, possibly narrated by one of them (Bull Run) or another character (Vertes Années).

Album	Historical reference
1. Un chariot dans l'Ouest	
2. Du Nord au Sud	
3. Et pour quinze cents dollars en plus	
4. Outlaw	
5. Les Déserteurs	
6. La Prison de Robertsonville	Andersonville Prison
7. Les Bleus de la marine	Battle of Hampton Roads
8. Les Cavaliers du ciel	Union Army Balloon Corps
9. La Grande Patrouille	
10. Des Bleus et des tuniques	
11. Des Bleus en noir et blanc	Mathew Brady
12. Les Bleus tournent cosaques	
13. Les Bleus dans la gadoue	The Mud March
14. Le Blanc-bec	
15. Rumberley	
16. Bronco Benny	
17. El Padre	
18. Blue rétro	
19. Le David	Anaconda Plan; CSS David
20. Black Face	
21. Les Cinq Salopards	
22. Des Bleus et des dentelles	
23. Les cousins d'en face	
24. Baby blue	
25. Des Bleus et des bosses	
26. L'Or du Québec	
27. Bull Run	First Battle of Bull Run
28. Les Bleus de la balle	
29. En avant l'amnésique	
30. La Rose de Bantry	Trent Affair
31. Drummer boy	
32. Les Bleus en folie	
33. Grumbler et fils	
34. Vertes Années	
35. Captain Nepel	
36. Quantrill	William Quantrill
37. Duel dans la Manche	Battle of Cherbourg
38. Les Planqués	
39. Puppet Blues	
40. Les Hommes de paille	
41. Les Bleus en cavale	
42. Qui veut la peau du général ?	Ulysses S. Grant
43. Des Bleus et du blues	
44. L'Oreille de Lincoln	Siege of Vicksburg
45. Émeutes à New York	Draft Riots
46. Requiem pour un Bleu	
47. Les Nancy Hart	Nancy Harts
48. Arabesque	
49. Mariage à Fort Bow	
50. La Traque	
51. Stark sous toutes les coutures	
52. Des Bleus dans le brouillard	Joseph Hooker, Battle of Lookout Mountain
53. Sang bleu chez les Bleus	François d'Orléans
54. Miss Walker	Mary Edwards Walker
55. Indien, mon frère	
56. Dent pour dent	
57. Colorado Story	
58. Les Bleus se mettent au vert	
59. Les Quatre Évangélistes	William Nelson Pendleton
60. Carte blanche pour un bleu	
61. L'Étrange Soldat Franklin	Sarah Emma Edmonds
62. Sallie	Sallie Ann Jarret
63. La bataille du Cratère	Battle of the Crater
64. Où est Arabesque ?	
65. L'envoyé spécial	William Howard Russell
66. Irish Melody	Irish Brigade (Union Army)
67. Du Feu sur la glace	Stand Watie

== English translations ==
Cinebook Ltd has started publishing English translations from 2008, as "The Bluecoats". Sixteen books have been published to date.

1. Robertsonville Prison (French #6), 2008, ISBN 978-1-905460-71-7
2. The Navy Blues (French #7), 2009, ISBN 978-1-905460-82-3
3. The Skyriders (French #8), 2010, ISBN 978-1-84918-014-6
4. The Greenhorn (French #14), 2011, ISBN 978-1-84918-066-5
5. Rumberley (French #15), 2012, ISBN 978-1-84918-108-2
6. Bronco Benny (French #16), 2013, ISBN 978-1-84918-146-4
7. The Blues in the Mud (French #13), 2014, ISBN 978-1-84918-183-9
8. Auld Lang Blue (French #18), 2015, ISBN 978-1-84918-245-4
9. El Padre (French #17), 2016, ISBN 978-1-84918-286-7
10. The Blues in Black and White (French #11), 2017, ISBN 978-1-84918-341-3
11. Cossack Circus (French #12), 2018, ISBN 978-1-84918-383-3
12. The David (French #19), 2019, ISBN 978-1-84918-430-4
13. Something Borrowed, Something Blue ISBN 9781849185318
14. The Dirty Five ISBN 978-1-80044-004-3
15. Bull Run ISBN 978-1-80044-061-6
16. Sallie ISBN 978-1-80044-089-0

== Video games ==
Les Tuniques Bleues was made into a video game named North & South in 1989 by Infogrames. In 2012, this game was adapted by Anuman Interactive as a multiplayer game.

== In popular culture ==
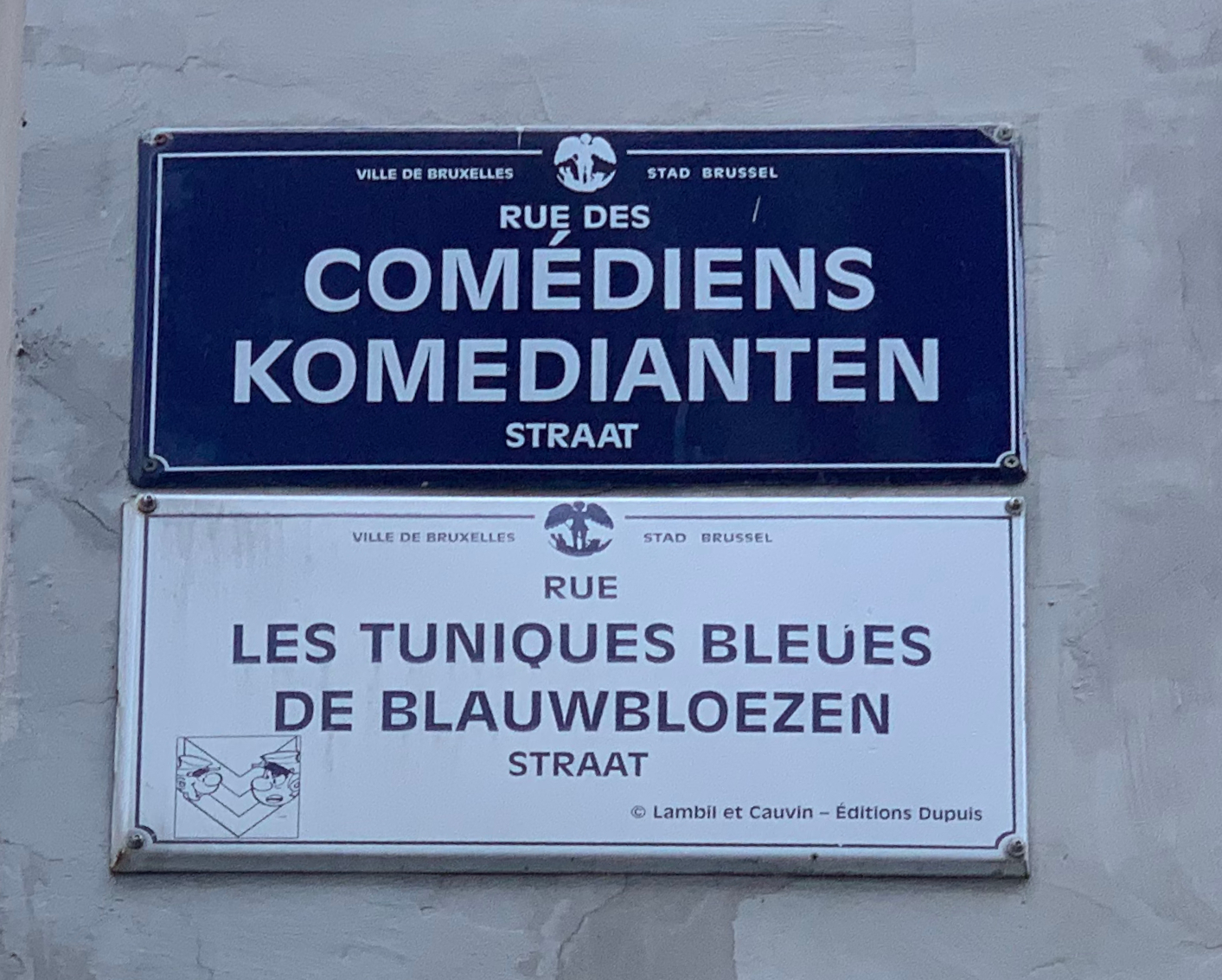
Rue des comédiens (and the Tuniques bleues) - Brussels.

Les Tuniques Bleues are among the many Belgian comic characters to jokingly have a Brussels street named after them. The Rue des Comédiens/ Komediantenstraat has a commemorative plaque with the name Rue des Tuniques Bleues/ Blauwbloezenstraat placed under the actual street sign.
