= Raoul Cauvin =

Belgian humoristic comics writer (1938–2021)

Cauvin
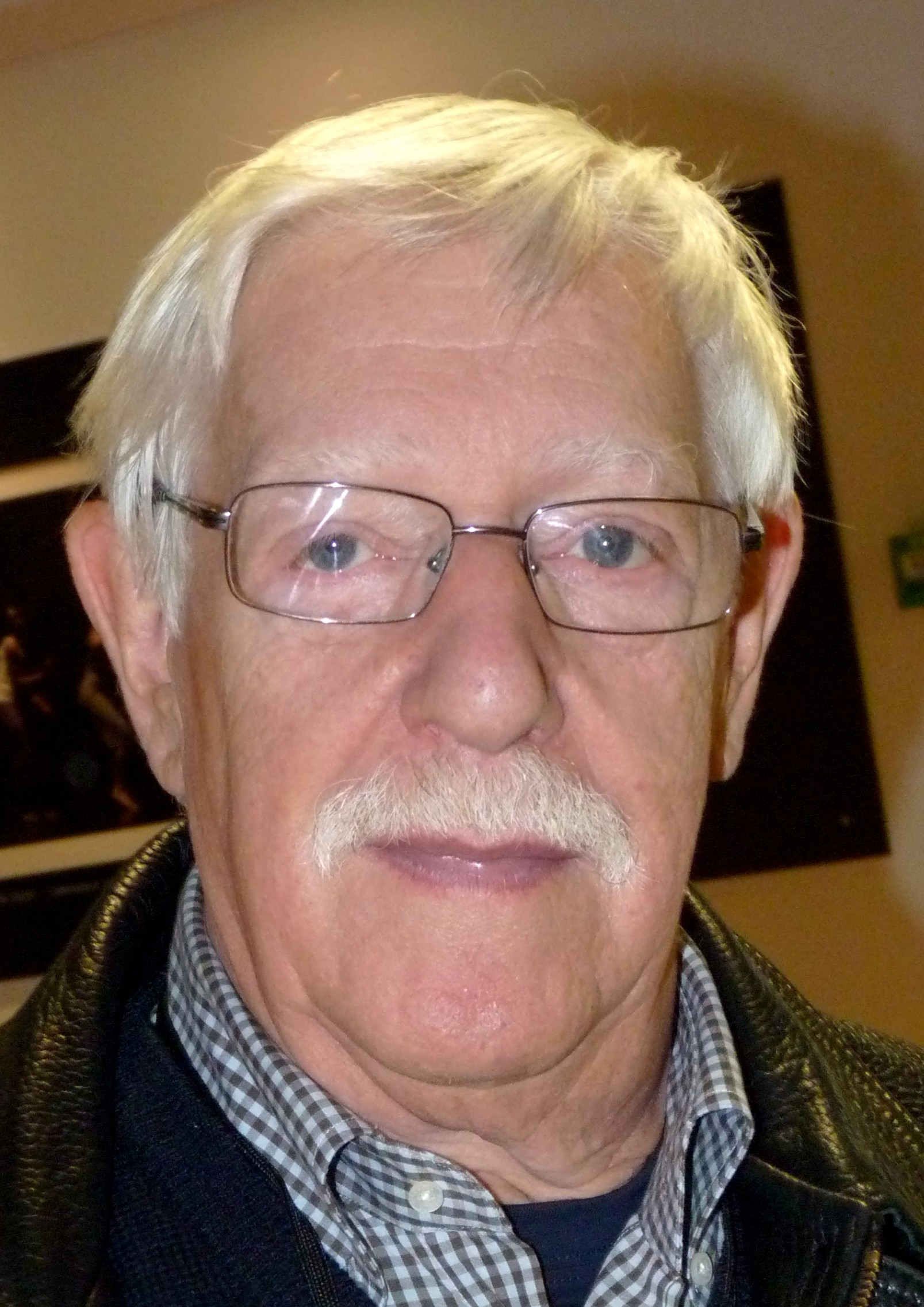
- Cauvin in 2012
- Born: Raoul Cauvin; 26 September 1938 Antoing, Belgium
- Died: 19 August 2021 (aged 82)
- Area: Writer
- Notable works: Les Tuniques Bleues; Sammy; Les Femmes en Blanc
- Awards: Full list

Raoul Cauvin (French: [kovɛ̃]; 26 September 1938 – 19 August 2021) was a Belgian comics author and one of the most popular in the humorist field.

== Biography ==
Raoul Cauvin was born in Antoing, Belgium in 1938. He studied lithography at the Institut Saint-Luc in Tournai, but upon leaving school found that there were no jobs available for lithographers. He started working at Dupuis in 1960 as a cameraman for the small animation studio the publishing house had started, working on early Smurfs cartoons and other short movies. After a few years, he started writing comics and has since become one of the most prolific Franco-Belgian comics authors, almost always staying true to Dupuis and the weekly Franco-Belgian comics magazine Spirou. Some of his earliest work was for artists like Claire Bretécher, Gennaux and Eddy Ryssack.

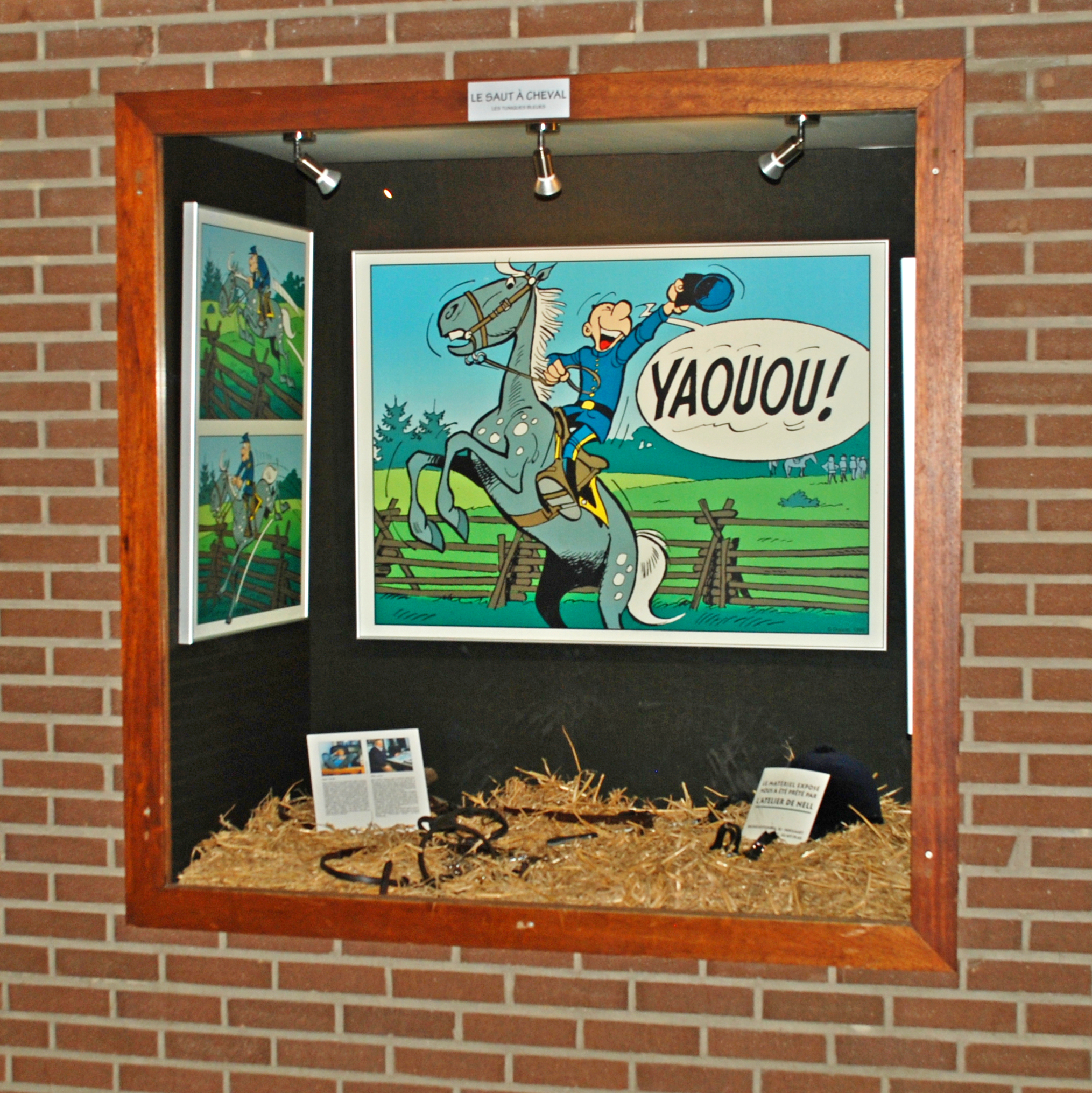
Corporal Blutch from Les Tuniques Bleues

When Lucky Luke, the successful, long-running Western series, moved from Spirou to rival magazine Pilote magazine, Cauvin came up with Les Tuniques Bleues (French for "The Blue Coats") which is set among the U.S. Cavalry around the time of the American Civil War. It was at first drawn by Louis Salvérius who, upon his death, was replaced by Lambil, and has since become a major best-selling comic book series with more than 15 million albums sold.

Cauvin added another success in 1972 with Sammy, about bodyguards in Chicago during the Prohibition era, drawn by Berck. A short stint on Spirou and Fantasio (drawn by Nic Broca) was not so successful. Cauvin continued to work for the animation studio as well, writing the scripts for the Musti, Tip and Tap and The Pili's cartoons by Ray Goossens.

He lived in Nivelles since 1991. By November 1999, he had published over 237 albums, selling over 45 million in total.

Cauvin, who suffered from cancer, died 19 August 2021

== Themes ==
Cauvin's work was almost always humoristic, but he produced both long stories (i.e. 44 pages) and short gags (between half a page and 6 pages). He started mainly with historical series: Les Tuniques Bleues uses the American Civil War as background, while Sammy plays in the time of Al Capone and Eliot Ness, and Les Mousquetaires describes the adventures of three musketeers in the 17th century. But with Agent 212 (French for "Officer 212"), featuring a rather stupid cop, he started to make his stories more contemporary, and in the 1980s he breached increasingly taboo subjects and introduced more satirical-critical views with themes like nursing and hospitals in Les Femmes en Blanc ("The Women in White") with Philippe Bercovici, Les Paparazzi or gravediggers in Pierre Tombal.

Although best known for Les Tuniques Bleues, he and Lambil also worked on a comics series called Pauvre Lampil ("Poor Lampil"), a semi-autobiographical account of the trials and tribulations of a melancholic comic strip artist and his love-hate relationship with his scriptwriter, caricatures of Lambil and Cauvin themselves. In fact, aside from Lambil (whose name is changed to "Lampil"), other characters, including their colleagues in the comic book industry, are referred to by their real or pen-names: Cauvin himself, Fournier, Franquin etc.

Cauvin also took up more fantastic themes like that of a love angel in Cupido or the hard life of a vulture falling in love with an owl in Les Voraces. Other more recent series include Cédric, a domestic strip surrounding a pre-adolescent schoolboy, and Les Psy ("The Shrinks") about a psychiatrist whose patients' eccentricities often lead him to question his own sanity. A lot of Cauvin's characters are of the short-tempered sort, easily provoked and exploding in rage when things go wrong.

He made his scripts in the form of a rudimentary comic, suggesting a page lay-out, and he also made a few comics completely on his own, but with limited success.

== Critics and success ==
His works are often seen as more artisanal than artistic by the critics, while others consider him an uncontested master of the humoristic comic.

Whatever the critics think of him though, he continues to be very successful with the public and sought after by artists, at one stage writing almost a dozen series at a time. In 2006 alone, he had six series in the list of best selling new comics of the ACBD, with Cédric securing the fourth spot with 288,900 albums and Les Tuniques Bleues at ten with 184,800 copies. His other most successful comics were Les Femmes en Blanc (78,000 copies), Agent 212 (66,000 copies), Les Psy (51,500 copies) and Pierre Tombal (45,700 copies). In 2010, he was the 7th bestselling author of comics in France, with sales of 569,000 copies that year.

As a thank you from the publisher Dupuis, Spirou magazine no. 3676, published 24 September 2008, was, in connection to Cauvin's 70th birthday, made as a tribute to Cauvin, where nearly half of the magazine consists of tributes to Cauvin as comics, artwork or articles.

== Awards ==
- 1975: Best Comical Album at the Prix Saint-Michel, Brussels, Belgium for Sammy
- 1976: Best Foreign Author at the Angoulême International Comics Festival, France
- 2001: Nomination for Best Youth Album at the Angoulême International Comics Festival, France for CRS = détresse
- 2004: Prix Canal J for the best youth album for Cédric
- 2005: Prix Canal J for Cédric
- 2006: Nomination for Best Album at the Albert Uderzo Awards in Nîmes, France for Les Tuniques Bleues
- 2008: Grand Prix Saint-Michel

== Selected bibliography ==
All stories originally appeared in Spirou magazine and published in album by Dupuis unless otherwise stated.

- Agent 212 (artist: Daniel Kox; 30 albums, since 1975)
- Boulouloum et Guiliguili (artist: Mazel; 10 albums, between 1975 and 1988)
- Cédric (artist: Laudec; 34 albums, since 1989)
- CRS=Détresse (artist: Achdé; 12 albums published by Dargaud, since 1993)
- Cupidon (artist Malik; 21 albums, since 1988)
- Les Femmes en Blanc (artist: Philippe Bercovici; 42 albums, since 1986)
- Godaille et Godasse (artist: Sandron; 5 albums, between 1982 and 1988)
- Les Grandes amours contrariées (artist: Philippe Bercovici; 1 album in 1982)
- Les Mousquetaires (artist: Mazel; 8 albums, between 1972 and 1998)
- Natacha (artist: François Walthéry; Album #13 in 1988)
- Les Naufragés (artist: Claire Bretécher; 1 album, in 1968)
- Les Paparazzi (artist: Mazel; 10 albums, since 1996)
- Pauvre Lampil (artist: Lambil; 7 albums, between 1973 and 1995)
- Pierre Tombal (artist: Marc Hardy; 32 albums, since 1983)
- Du côté de chez Poje (artist: Carpentier; 20 albums, since 1986)
- Les Psy (artist: Bédu; 15 albums, since 1992)
- Sammy (artist: Berck, since 1995 Jean-Pol; 40 albums, since 1970)
- Spirou et Fantasio (artist: Nic Broca; Albums #30-#32, between 1983 and 1984)
- Taxi Girl (artist: Laudec, 2 albums, between 1994 and 1996)
- Les Tuniques Bleues (artist: Salvérius, after his death Lambil; 65 albums, since 1968)
- Le Vieux Bleu (artist: François Walthéry, 1 album, in 1980)
- Les Voraces (artist: Glem; 5 albums, between 1986 and 1994)

== Sources ==
- De Saeger, Kris (1995), Dossier Cauvin. Arboris. ISBN 90-343-2435-4
- Cauvin publications in Spirou BDoubliées (in French)
