= Louis Salvérius =

Belgian comics artist

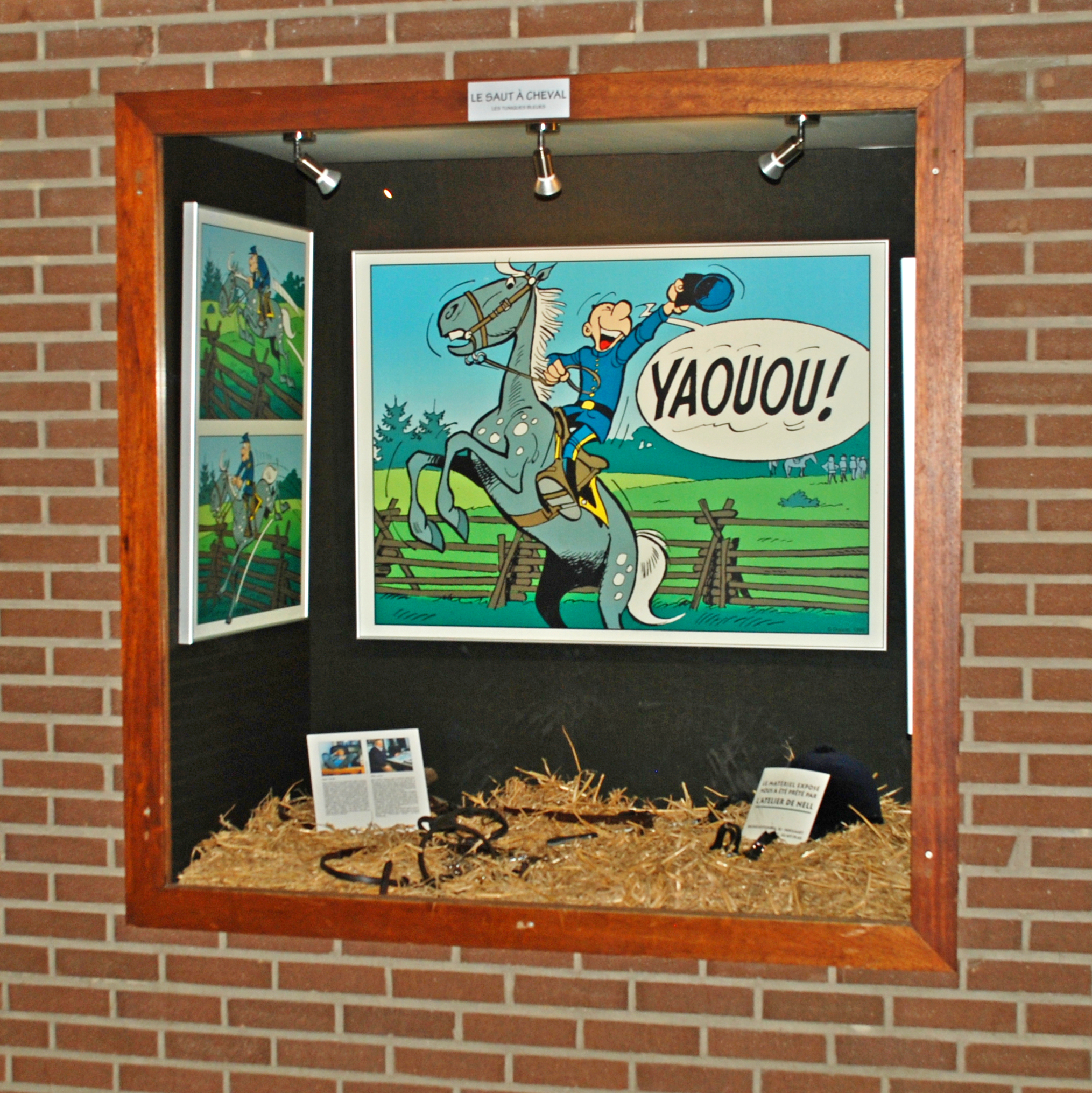
Corporal Blutch.

Louis Salvérius, also known as Salvérius or Salve (4 December 1933 – 22 May 1972) was a Belgian comics artist. He was best known for co-creating the Les Tuniques Bleues series. He died at the age of 38 from a heart attack, after which the series was taken over by Lambil.
