= 1934 in comics =

Notable events of 1934 in comics.

== Events and publications ==
=== January ===
- January 7: Alex Raymond's Flash Gordon and Jungle Jim make their debut. Flash Gordon will run until 2003, while Jungle Jim lasts until 1954.
- January 16: The first episode of the gag comic Van Boring, by future animation legend Frank Tashlin, is published. It will run until 1936.
- January 22: Alex Raymond's Secret Agent X-9 makes its debut and will run until 1996. The original stories are written by famous detective writer Dashiel Hammett.

=== February ===
- February - August: Hergé's Popol Out West is serialized in Le Petit Vingtième.

=== March ===
- March 4: The final episode of Bucky Bug as part of the Silly Symphony feature is published.
- March 5: Frank Victor Martinek's Don Winslow of the Navy makes its debut. It will run until 30 July 1955.
- March 19: Will Gould's Red Barry makes its debut.

=== April ===
- April: David Low's Colonel Blimp makes his debut.

=== May ===
- Zeke Wolf and the three little pigs debut in comics, in a Tom Wood's table for the magazine Good Housekkeping.

=== June ===
- June 11: Lee Falk and Fred Fredericks's Mandrake the Magician makes its debut.
- June 30: The first episode of the Mickey Mouse story Bobo the Elephant appears in print, by Floyd Gottfredson and Ted Osborne. This marks the debut of the villain Eli Squinch.

=== July ===
- July 23: The first episode of Bud Counihan's Betty Boop newspaper comic is published. It will run until 1937.
- Famous Funnies #1 (Eastern Color Printing) - The first full-color comic book sold to the public. It set the standard of 68 pages, including covers, and sold for 10 cents. Early issues of this series, starting with #1, advertised the contents as "100 Comics and Games - Puzzles - Magic."

=== August ===
- August 9: in Le petit Vingtième, first episode of The blue lotus, by Hergè.
- August 13: Al Capp's Li'l Abner makes its debut.

=== September ===
- September 16: Ted Osborne and Al Taliaferro's Silly Symphony comic strip adapts the cartoon The Wise Little Hen, which marks the official debut of Donald Duck (who debuted in that animated short) as a comics character.
- September 23: Rube Goldberg's Boob McNutt comes to a close.
- Famous Funnies #2 (Eastern Color Printing) - With this issue, Famous Funnies would become the first monthly newsstand comic publication.

=== October ===
- October 1: Fred Neher's Life's Like That makes its debut.
- October 7: Fred Harman's Bronc Peeler makes its debut.
- October 14: The first issue of the Italian comics magazine L'Avventuroso is published. It will run until 16 May 1943.
- October 21: First publication of the French Disney comics magazine Le Journal de Mickey. A test issue was already published on June 1, 1934.
- October 22: Milton Caniff's Terry and the Pirates makes its debut.
- Famous Funnies #3 (Eastern Color Printing)

=== November ===
- November 17: In Billy DeBeck's Barney Google Snuffy Smith makes its debut, leading to an eventual title change as Barney Google and Snuffy Smith.
- Famous Funnies #4 (Eastern Color Printing)
- Adolphe Barreaux' Sally the Sleuth debuts in Spicy Detective.

=== December ===
- December 13: E.O. Plauen's Vater und Sohn (Father and Son) makes its debut.
- December 16: The U.S. magazine The American Weekly prints the first episode of Les Mystères Surrealistes de New York, a comic strip drawn by famous painter Salvador Dalí. It will run until 7 July 1935
- Famous Funnies #5 (Eastern Color Printing)

=== Specific date unknown ===
- Walter Goetz launches his newspaper comics Colonel Up and Mr. Down and Dab and Flounder.
- Shaka Bontaro draws an illegal Japanese-language Mickey Mouse story: Mikkii no Katsuyaku.

== Births ==
=== January ===
- January 11: Antonio Seguí, Argentine cartoonist, (d. 2022).

=== February ===
- February 18: Cor Blok, Dutch illustrator and comics artist (The Iron Parachute), (d. 2021).

=== March ===
- March 10: Fujiko A. Fujio, Japanese manga artist (Ninja Hattori-kun, The Monster Kid, The Laughing Salesman), (d. 2022).

=== June ===
- June 28: Georges Wolinski, French cartoonist and comics writer (Charlie Hebdo), (d. 2015)

=== December ===
- December 28: Herb Gardner, American playwright, screenwriter and comics artist (The Nebbishes), (d. 2003) from lung disease.

== Deaths ==
=== February ===
- February 15: Louis Forton, French comics writer and artist (Les Pieds Nickelés, Bibi Fricotin, Ploum), dies at age 54.
- February 27: John Terry, American comics artist and animator (Scorchy Smith, continued Have You Seen Alonzo?), dies at age 53 or 54.

=== June ===
- June 3: Chic Jackson, American comics artist (Roger Bean), dies at age 57 from a heart attack.
- June 4: August Roeseler, German illustrator (made picture stories for Fliegende Blätter and Simplicissimus), dies at age 68.

=== July ===
- July 26: Winsor McCay, American comics artist and animator (Little Nemo in Slumberland, Dream of the Rarebit Fiend, Little Sammy Sneeze, Gertie the Dinosaur) dies at age 64 from a cerebral embolism.

=== November ===
- November 23: Albert Funke Küpper, Dutch comics artist (Krelissie en Direkkie, continued Snuffelgraag en Knagelijntje), dies at age 40 in a car accident.

=== December ===
- December 10: Dan Smith, American illustrator and comics artist (The Jungle Folk, comics based on the Bible), dies at age 69.

=== Specific date unknown ===
- Pierre Dmitrow, Russian-French illustrator (drew picture stories for children's magazines), dies at age 50 or 51.
- Lee Do-Yeong, Korean comics artist and illustrator, dies at age 49 or 50.
- August Roeseler, German cartoonist, caricaturist, illustrator and comics artist (worked for Fliegende Blätter and Simplicissimus), dies at age 77 or 78.

== First issues by title ==
- Famous Funnies on newsstands in May, cover dated July, published by Eastern Color Printing Company.
