= Société Parisienne d'Édition =

French publishing house

The Société Parisienne d'Édition (S.P.É. or SPÉ), originally known as Offenstadt Frères then Publications Offenstadt, was a French publishing house founded by the Offenstadt brothers towards the end of the 19th century. They adopted the name "Société parisienne d'édition" just after the end of the First World War. The five Offenstadt brothers – Charles, Georges, Maurice, Nathan and Villefranche – had a wide range of publications within their portfolio, exploiting technical advances in low-cost colour lithography. They are best known for publishing popular periodicals aimed at the youth market, such as L'Épatant, L'Intrépide and L'Illustré; and comics, often featuring larger than life characters like Les Pieds nickelés, L'Espiègle Lili and Bibi Fricotin. They also published magazines aimed at adult audiences, providing a platform for emerging and sometimes controversial writers and artists – such as Maurice de Vlaminck and André Derain. They were among the first to publish (in Sciences et Voyages) Jean Vieuchange's bestselling account of the epic journey to Smara, made by Jean's brother, Michel Vieuchange in 1931.

The Offenstadt brothers were often the target of the moral censure of the period, particularly from French senator, René Bérenger, popularly known as père pudeur ("papa prudity"). Because of the brothers' Jewish origins, they were stripped of ownership of their publishing house in 1940 under the Aryanisation laws during the Occupation. They regained control in 1946 but by then competitors had moved into their niche and they were unable to repeat their pre-war successes. In the 1960s, SPE was taken over by Publications Georges Ventillard, which in turn disappeared in 1990.

== Notable publications ==
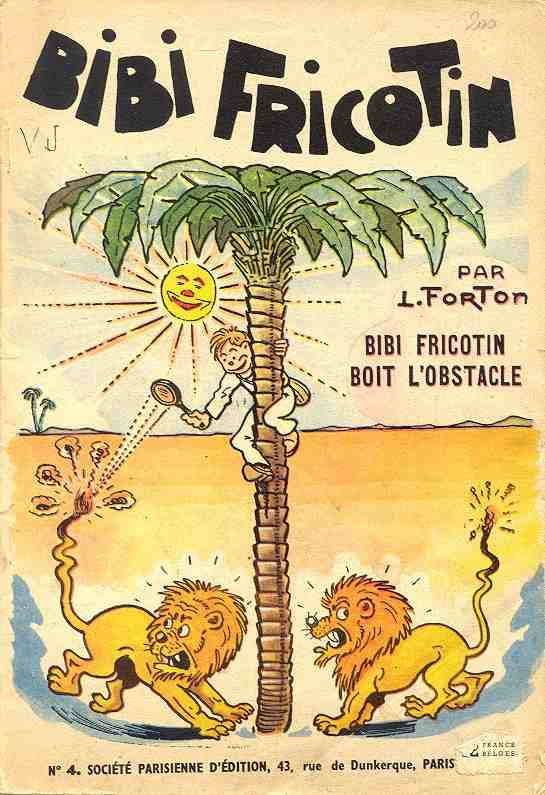
The Bibi Fricotin strip from Le Petit Illustré

Year	Title	Notes
1904	L'Illustré	Replaced by Le Petit Illustré
1906	Le Petit Illustré	
1908	L'Épatant	
1909	Fillette	
1909	Cri-cri	
1910	L'Intrépide	
1915	La Croix d'honneur	Merged with Cri-cri in 1918
1919	Lili	
1919	Sciences et voyages	Weekly until issue number 826, then monthly
1921	Les Histoires en images	
1924	Le Pêle-Mêle	
1936	Junior	
1937	L'As	
1980s	Micro Systèmes	computer magazine

== Notes and sources ==
Notes

Sources

- Dioudonnat, Pierre-Marie (1981). 'L'argent nazi à la conquête de la presse française, 1940-1944 (in French). Paris: Éditions J. Picollec. ISBN 978-2-86477-029-9.
- Pagès, Alain (2010). Zola au Panthéon: L'épilogue de l'affaire Dreyfus (in French). Paris: Presses Sorbonne Nouvelle. ISBN 978-2-87854-485-5.
- Thoveron, Gabriel (2008). Deux siècles de paralittératures. Lecture, sociologie, histoire. Tome 2 De 1895 à 1995 (in French). Liège: Editions du Céfal. ISBN 978-2-87130-268-1.
- Vieuchange, Michel (1931). "Le raid héroïque de Michel Vieuchange à Smara" (in French). Sciences et voyages. Vieuchange, Jean (editor). In five parts, weekly: 31 Dec 1931–28 Jan 1932. Part I: issue 644, 31 Dec 1931, pp 7–10. Part II: issue 645, 7 Jan 1932, pp 7–10. Part III: issue 645, 14 Jan 1932, pp 13–16. Part IV: issue 647, 21 Jan 1932, pp 7–10. Part V: issue 648, 28 Jan 1932, pp 3–5. Paris: Société Parisienne d'Édition.
