= Vieuchange =

Vieuchange is a surname. Notable people with the surname include:

- Jean Vieuchange (1906–2003), French adventurer
- Michel Vieuchange (1904–1930), French adventurer
