= X-ray vision =

Fictional superpower

In science fiction stories or superhero comics, X-ray vision is the supernatural ability to see through normally opaque physical objects at the discretion of the holder of this superpower. The most famous possessor of this ability is DC Comics' iconic superhero character, Superman.

== In fiction ==
Among the best known figures with "x-ray vision" are the fictional Superman, and the protagonist of the 1963 film X. The first person with X-ray vision in a comic book was Olga Mesmer in 1937's Spicy Mysteries. She is often considered to be one of the first superheroes. In myth, Lynceus of the Argonauts possessed a similar ability.

Although called X-ray vision, this power has little to do with the actual effect of X-rays. Instead, it is usually presented as the ability to selectively see through certain objects as though they are invisible or transparent in order to see objects or surfaces beyond or deep inside the affected object or material. Thus, Superman can see through walls to see the criminals beyond, or see through Lois Lane's dress to determine the color of her underwear (in Superman: The Movie, Warner Brothers, 1978). In such cases, the visions seen are generally in full color and in three dimensions. How such an effect might be created via x-rays is unexplained (the x-rays from the viewer's eyes would need to bounce back to their eyes the same way normal light reflects off objects and into the viewer's eyes: x-rays simply pass through an object and continue on their way. X-ray films are made as x-rays pass through an object and then through the x-ray film. The images seen on x-ray film are "shadows" of the objects the x-rays passed through on their way to the film). As depicted, x-ray vision is actually more of a form of the supposed psychic ability of remote viewing.

== In reality ==
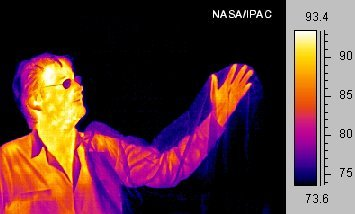
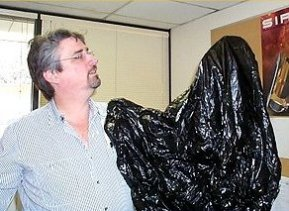
A comparison of a thermal image (top) and an ordinary photograph (bottom). The plastic bag is mostly transparent to long-wavelength infrared, but the man's glasses are opaque.

X-rays have many practical uses for scientific and medical imaging. Security agencies are experimenting with applications of imaging devices which can "see" through clothing (using terahertz waves). Such devices are being deployed in some airports as a way of detecting contraband, such as guns, knives, and any other weapons in particular which may be carried beneath a person's clothing, bag, etc. The devices have created some degree of controversy from personal privacy advocates who worry about screeners being able to see people "naked." There also exist certain night-vision equipped cameras that can be modified to see through clothing at a frequency just below visible light. Such imaging is not true x-ray vision, but rather shows variations in heat radiation rising from the skin beneath the clothing which can provide some detail of the body beneath.

In comic books in the latter half of the 20th century, there often appeared an advertisement for "X-ray specs" which displayed the face of a smiling boy wearing glasses with spirals on the lenses looking at his hand through which he could see the bones.

While X-rays cannot be used in practice to enable seeing objects through walls, researchers have recently shown how everyday wireless signals, such as wi-fi, can be used to achieve x-ray vision.

== See also ==
- Wall hack
- Fluoroscopy
- Backscatter X-ray
