= Keats Petree =

American illustrative artist (1919-1997)

Keats E. Petree (21 September 1919 – 26 November 1997) was an American illustrative artist with significant contributions to both pulp magazines and comic strips in the 1940s and 1950s. His works were primarily in color, as inked strips and both oil and watercolor paintings. Petree's most memorable comic book credits were for the later comic versions of Sally the Sleuth, a pulp comic strip heroine created originally by Adolphe Barreaux in 1934 in Spicy Detective Stories, but his greatest recognition was earned by his pulp color work for the Queenie Starr series, also in Spicy Detective Stories. Other notable Petree work included The Lone Ranger (Dell/Western), Girl Friday (Trojan), the Sally the Sleuth pulp installment entitled Blonde Decoy (in this case for Private Detective Stories, August 1950), Wilma West: The Range Runs Red (Leading Western, September, 1950), a daily strip and Sunday strip in the fifties, Nick Haliday, and a wide variety of other pulp and comic issues. He also produced an undetermined number of non-genre oil and watercolor paintings.

Late in his career (1980s) Petree designed a series of promotional Limited Edition Trays for McDonald's restaurants.

Petree is profiled in Peter Haining's The Classic Era of the American Pulp Magazines and in The Artist's Bluebook: 34,000 North American Artists (Lonnie Pierson Dunbier, ed.)

Personal: Keats E. Petree was born September 21, 1919, in Bristol, Sullivan, Tennessee, USA and died November 26, 1997 in Fulton Co., Georgia. The youngest of three children of Edward Vernon Petree and Tessie L. Stout, he grew up in Knoxville, Tennessee and was a working theater artist in 1940. He served in the Air Corps Reserves during World War II after enlisting on September 22, 1942. He has obtained the rank of 2ND LT US ARMY upon his discharge. He married Margaret B. Ogle 21 Jun 1945 - Pettis, Missouri, USA. Burial: Arlington Memorial Park; Atlanta, Georgia, USA.
