= Bibi Fricotin (film) =

1951 film

- Directed by: Marcel Blistène
- Written by: Arthur Harfaux
- Starring: Maurice Baquet; Louis de Funès
- Music by: Jacques Besse
- Release date: 1951
- Running time: 89 minutes
- Country: France
- Language: French

Bibi Fricotin, is a French comedy film from 1951, directed by Marcel Blistène, written by Arthur Harfaux, and starring Maurice Baquet. It was based on the popular French comic strip series Bibi Fricotin.

== Cast ==
- Maurice Baquet: Bibi Fricotin
- Colette Darfeuil: Mrs Suzy Fatma
- Nicole Francis: Catherine
- Alexandre Rignault: Mr Tartazan
- Paul Demange: the museum's curator
- Yves Robert: Antoine Gardon
- Milly Mathis: Mrs Tartazan (Catherine's aunt)
- Jacques Famery: a reporter
- Louis de Funès (uncredited)
