= Dysentery =

Intestinal inflammation causing bloody diarrhea

- Other names: Bloody diarrhea
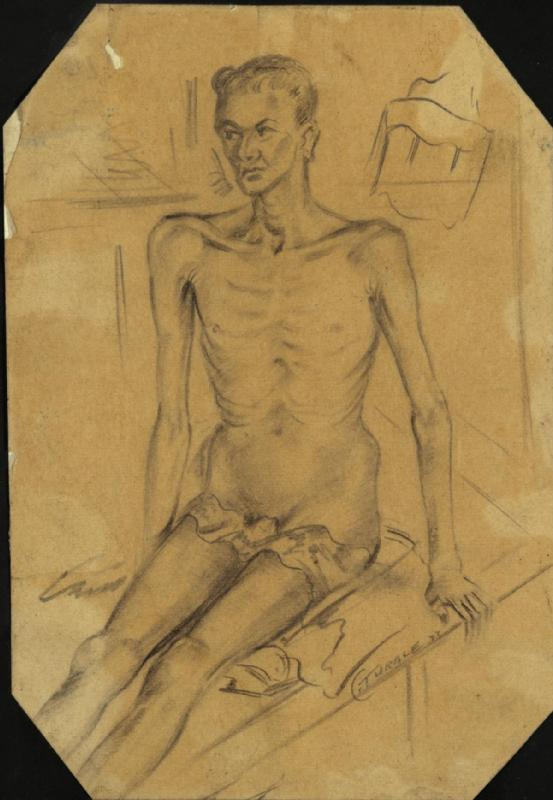
- A depiction of a soldier with dysentery in the 'F' & 'H' Force Hospital, Canchanburi, Siam. Artist: Charles Thrale, 1943
- Specialty: Infectious disease
- Symptoms: Bloody diarrhea, abdominal pain, fever
- Complications: Dehydration
- Duration: Less than a week
- Causes: Usually Shigella or Entamoeba histolytica
- Risk factors: Contamination of food and water with feces due to poor sanitation
- Diagnostic method: Based on symptoms, Stool test
- Prevention: Hand washing, food safety
- Treatment: Drinking sufficient fluids, antibiotics or antiparasitics (severe cases)
- Frequency: Occurs often in many parts of the world
- Deaths: 1.1 million a year

Dysentery (UK: /ˈdɪsəntəri/, US: /ˈdɪsəntɛri/), historically known as the bloody flux, is a type of gastroenteritis that results in bloody diarrhea. Other symptoms may include fever, abdominal pain, and a feeling of incomplete defecation. Complications may include dehydration.

The cause of dysentery is usually the bacteria from genus Shigella, in which case it is known as shigellosis, or the amoeba Entamoeba histolytica; then it is called amoebiasis or amoebic dysentery. Other causes may include certain chemicals, other bacteria, other protozoa, or parasitic worms. It may spread between people. Risk factors include contamination of food and water with feces due to poor sanitation. The underlying mechanism involves inflammation of the intestine, especially of the colon.

Efforts to prevent dysentery include hand washing and food safety measures while traveling in countries of high risk. While the condition generally resolves on its own within a week, drinking sufficient fluids such as oral rehydration solution is important. Antibiotics such as azithromycin may be used to treat cases associated with travelling in the developing world. While medications used to decrease diarrhea such as loperamide are not recommended on their own, they may be used together with antibiotics.

Shigella results in about 165 million cases of diarrhea and 1.1 million deaths a year with nearly all cases in the developing world. In areas with poor sanitation nearly half of cases of diarrhea are due to Entamoeba histolytica. Entamoeba histolytica affects millions of people and results in more than 55,000 deaths a year. It commonly occurs in less developed areas of Central and South America, Africa, and Asia. Dysentery has been described at least since the time of Hippocrates.

== Signs and symptoms ==
The most common form of dysentery is bacillary dysentery, which is typically a mild sickness, causing symptoms normally consisting of mild abdominal pains and frequent passage of loose stools or diarrhea. Symptoms normally present themselves after 1–3 days, and are usually no longer present after a week. The frequency of urges to defecate, the large volume of liquid feces ejected, and the presence of blood, mucus, or pus depends on the pathogen causing the disease. Temporary lactose intolerance can occur, as well. In some occasions, severe abdominal cramps, fever, shock, and delirium can all be symptoms.

In extreme cases, people may pass more than one liter of fluid per hour. More often, individuals will complain of diarrhea with blood, accompanied by extreme abdominal pain, rectal pain and a low-grade fever. Rapid weight loss and muscle aches sometimes also accompany dysentery, while nausea and vomiting are rare.

On rare occasions, the amoebic parasite will invade the body through the bloodstream and spread beyond the intestines. In such cases, it may more seriously infect other organs such as the brain, lungs, and most commonly the liver.

== Cause ==
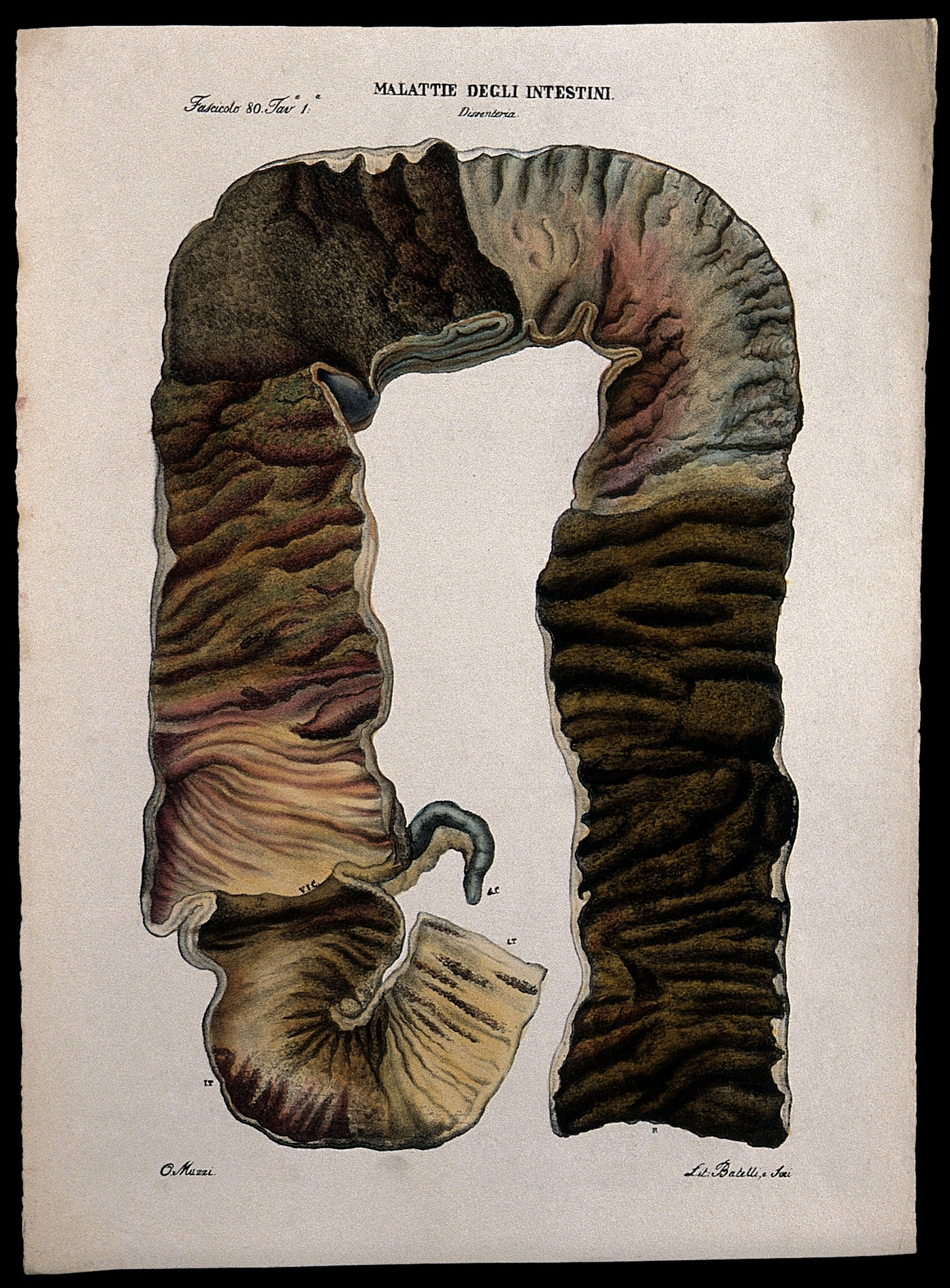
Cross-section of diseased intestines. Colored lithograph c. 1843

Dysentery results from bacterial or parasitic infections. Viruses do not generally cause the disease. These pathogens typically reach the large intestine after entering orally, through ingestion of contaminated food or water, oral contact with contaminated objects or hands, and so on. Each specific pathogen has its own mechanism or pathogenesis, but in general, the result is damage to the intestinal linings, leading to the inflammatory immune responses. This can cause elevated physical temperature, painful spasms of the intestinal muscles (cramping), swelling due to fluid leaking from capillaries of the intestine (edema) and further tissue damage by the body's immune cells and the chemicals, called cytokines, which are released to fight the infection. The result can be impaired nutrient absorption, excessive water and mineral loss through the stools due to breakdown of the control mechanisms in the intestinal tissue that normally remove water from the stools, and in severe cases, the entry of pathogenic organisms into the bloodstream. Anemia may also arise due to the blood loss through diarrhea.

Bacterial infections that cause bloody diarrhea are typically classified as being either invasive or toxogenic. Invasive species cause damage directly by invading into the mucosa. The toxogenic species do not invade, but cause cellular damage by secreting toxins, resulting in bloody diarrhea. This is also in contrast to toxins that cause watery diarrhea, which usually do not cause cellular damage, but rather they take over cellular machinery for a portion of life of the cell.

Definitions of dysentery can vary by region and by medical specialty. The U. S. Centers for Disease Control and Prevention (CDC) limits its definition to "diarrhea with visible blood". Others define the term more broadly. These differences in definition must be taken into account when defining mechanisms. For example, using the CDC definition requires that intestinal tissue be so severely damaged that blood vessels have ruptured, allowing visible quantities of blood to be lost with defecation. Other definitions require less specific damage.

=== Amoebic dysentery ===
Amoebiasis, also known as amoebic dysentery, is caused by an infection from the amoeba Entamoeba histolytica, which is found mainly in tropical areas. Proper treatment of the underlying infection of amoebic dysentery is important; insufficiently treated amoebiasis can lie dormant for years and subsequently lead to severe, potentially fatal, complications.

When amoebae inside the bowel of an infected person are ready to leave the body, they group together and form a shell that surrounds and protects them. This group of amoebae is known as a cyst, which is then passed out of the person's body in the feces and can survive outside the body. If hygiene standards are poor – for example, if the person does not dispose of the feces hygienically – then it can contaminate the surroundings, such as nearby food and water. If another person then eats or drinks food or water that has been contaminated with feces containing the cyst, that person will also become infected with the amoebae. Amoebic dysentery is particularly common in parts of the world where human feces are used as fertilizer. After entering the person's body through the mouth, the cyst travels down into the stomach. The amoebae inside the cyst are protected from the stomach's digestive acid. From the stomach, the cyst travels to the intestines, where it breaks open and releases the amoebae, causing the infection. The amoebae can burrow into the walls of the intestines and cause small abscesses and ulcers to form. The cycle then begins again.

=== Bacillary dysentery ===
Dysentery may also be caused by shigellosis, an infection by bacteria of the genus Shigella, and is then known as bacillary dysentery (or Marlow syndrome). The term bacillary dysentery etymologically might seem to refer to any dysentery caused by any bacilliform bacteria, but its meaning is restricted by convention to Shigella dysentery.

=== Other bacteria ===
Some strains of Escherichia coli cause bloody diarrhea. The typical culprits are enterohemorrhagic Escherichia coli, of which O157:H7 is the best known. These types of E. coli also make Shiga toxin.

== Diagnosis ==
A diagnosis may be made by taking a history and doing a brief examination. Dysentery should not be confused with hematochezia, which is the passage of fresh blood through the anus, usually in or with stools.

=== Physical exam ===
The mouth, skin, and lips may appear dry due to dehydration. Lower abdominal tenderness may also be present.

=== Stool and blood tests ===
Cultures of stool samples are examined to identify the organism causing dysentery. Usually, several samples must be obtained due to the number of amoebae, which changes daily. Blood tests can be used to measure abnormalities in the levels of essential minerals and salts.

== Prevention ==
Efforts to prevent dysentery include hand washing and food safety measures while traveling in areas of high risk.

=== Vaccine ===
Although there is currently no vaccine that protects against Shigella infection, several are in development. Vaccination may eventually become a part of the strategy to reduce the incidence and severity of diarrhea, particularly among children in low-resource settings. For example, Shigella is a longstanding World Health Organization (WHO) target for vaccine development, and sharp declines in age-specific diarrhea/dysentery attack rates for this pathogen indicate that natural immunity does develop following exposure; thus, vaccination to prevent this disease should be feasible. The development of vaccines against these types of infection has been hampered by technical constraints, insufficient support for coordination, and a lack of market forces for research and development. Most vaccine development efforts are taking place in the public sector or as research programs within biotechnology companies.

== Treatment ==
Dysentery is managed by maintaining fluids using oral rehydration therapy. If this treatment cannot be adequately maintained due to vomiting or the profuseness of diarrhea, hospital admission may be required for intravenous fluid replacement. In ideal situations, no antimicrobial therapy should be administered until microbiological microscopy and culture studies have established the specific infection involved. When laboratory services are not available, it may be necessary to administer a combination of drugs, including an amoebicidal drug to kill the parasite, and an antibiotic to treat any associated bacterial infection. Laudanum (Deodorized Tincture of Opium) may be used for severe pain and to combat severe diarrhea.

If shigellosis is suspected and it is not too severe, letting it run its course may be reasonable – usually less than a week. If the case is severe, antibiotics such as ciprofloxacin or TMP-SMX may be useful. However, many strains of Shigella are becoming resistant to common antibiotics, and effective medications are often in short supply in developing countries. If necessary, a doctor may have to reserve antibiotics for those at highest risk for death, including young children, people over 50, and anyone suffering from dehydration or malnutrition.

Amoebic dysentery is often treated with two antimicrobial drugs such as metronidazole and paromomycin or iodoquinol.

== Prognosis ==
With correct treatment, most cases of amoebic and bacterial dysentery subside within 10 days, and most individuals achieve a full recovery within two to four weeks after beginning proper treatment. If the disease is left untreated, the prognosis varies with the immune status of the individual patient and the severity of disease. Extreme dehydration can delay recovery and significantly raises the risk for serious complications including death.

== Epidemiology ==
Insufficient data exists, but Shigella is estimated to have caused the death of 34,000 children under the age of five in 2013, and 40,000 deaths in people over five years of age. Amoebiasis infects over 50 million people each year, of whom 50,000 die (one per thousand).

== History ==
Shigella evolved with the human expansion out of Africa 50,000 to 200,000 years ago.

The seed, leaves, and bark of the kapok tree have been used in traditional medicines by indigenous peoples of the rainforest regions in the Americas, west-central Africa, and Southeast Asia in the treatment of this disease.

In 1915, Australian bacteriologist Fannie Eleanor Williams was serving as a medic in Greece with the Australian Imperial Force, receiving casualties directly from Gallipoli. In Gallipoli, dysentery was severely affecting soldiers and causing significant loss of manpower. Williams carried out serological investigations into dysentery, co-authoring several groundbreaking papers with Sir Charles Martin, director of the Lister Institute. The result of their work into dysentery was increased demand for specific diagnostics and curative sera.

Bacillus subtilis was marketed throughout America and Europe from 1946 as an immunostimulatory aid in the treatment of gut and urinary tract diseases such as rotavirus and Shigella, but declined in popularity after the introduction of consumer antibiotics.

== Notable cases ==
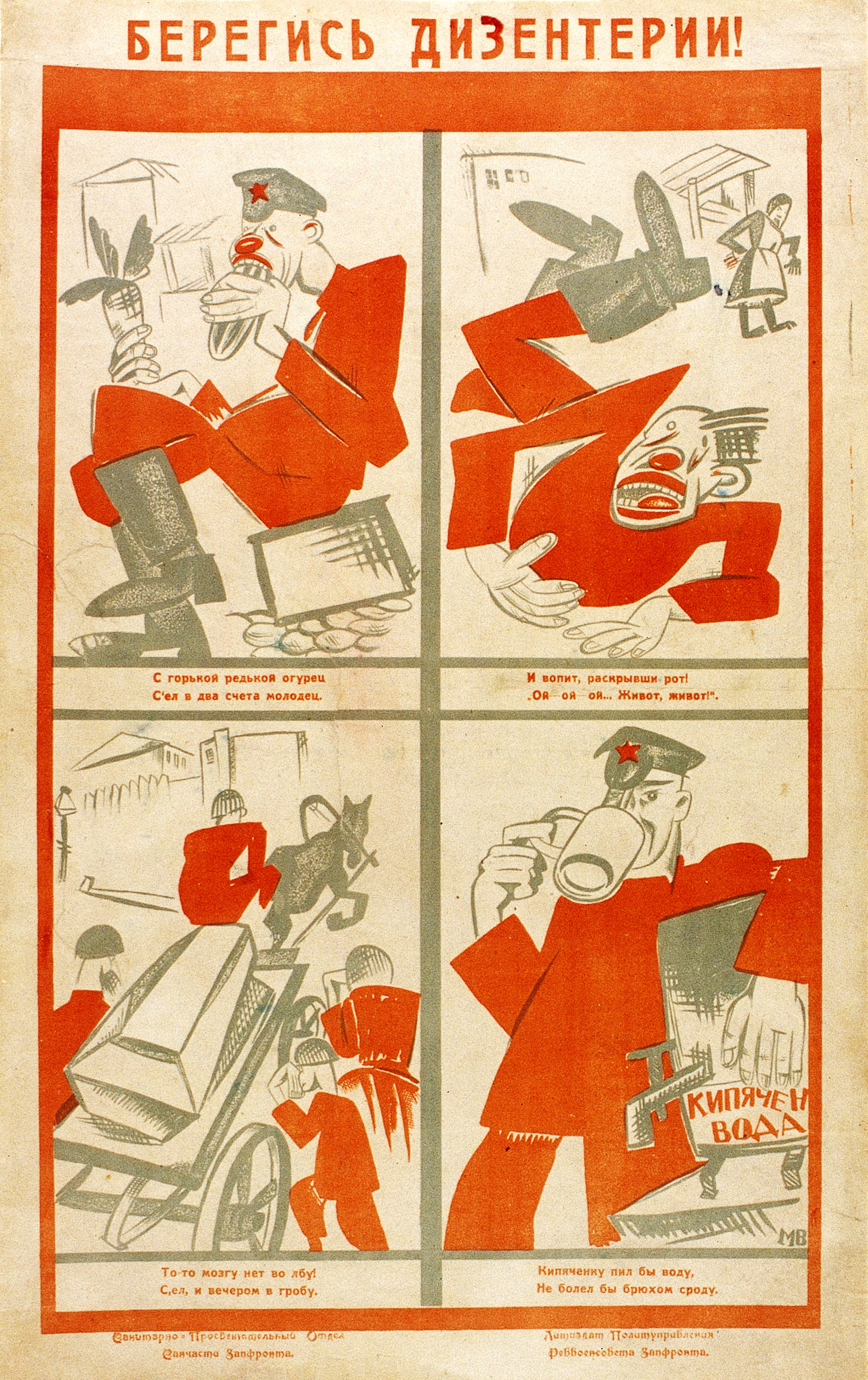
A Red Army soldier dies of dysentery after eating unwashed vegetables. This is a common way of contracting dysentery. From a health advisory pamphlet given to soldiers.

- 580: Childesinda, son of Chilperic I, Frankish king, died of dysentery as a child
- 580: Austregilde, Frankish queen, died of dysentery. According to Gregory of Tours she blamed her doctors for her death and asked her husband, King Guntram, to have the doctors executed after she died, which he did.
- 642: Cyrus of Alexandria, Greek Orthodox Patriarch of Alexandria and governor of Egypt, died of dysentery on 21 March 642.
- 685: Constantine IV, the Byzantine emperor, died of dysentery on September 685.
- 1183: Henry the Young King died of dysentery at the castle of Martel on 11 June 1183.
- 1216: John, King of England died of dysentery at Newark Castle on 19 October 1216.
- 1270: Louis IX of France died of dysentery in Tunis while commanding his troops for the Eighth Crusade on 25 August 1270.
- 1307: Edward I of England caught dysentery on his way to the Scottish border and died in his servants' arms on 7 July 1307.
- 1322: Philip V of France died of dysentery at the Abbey of Longchamp (site of the present hippodrome in the Bois de Boulogne) in Paris while visiting his daughter, Blanche, who had taken her vows as a nun there in 1322. He died on 3 January 1322.
- 1376: Edward the Black Prince, son of Edward III of England and heir to the English throne. Died of apparent dysentery in June, after a months-long period of illness during which he predicted his own imminent death, in his 46th year.
- 1422: King Henry V of England died suddenly on 31 August 1422 at the Château de Vincennes, apparently from dysentery, which he had contracted during the siege of Meaux. He was 35 years old and had reigned for nine years.
- 1536: Erasmus, Dutch renaissance humanist and theologian. At Basel.
- 1596: Sir Francis Drake, vice admiral, died of dysentery on 28 January 1596 whilst anchored off the coast of Portobelo.
- 1605: Akbar, ruler of the Mughal Empire of South Asia, died of dysentery. On 3 October 1605, he fell ill with an attack of dysentery, from which he never recovered. He is believed to have died on or about 27 October 1605, after which his body was buried in a mausoleum in Agra, present-day India.
- 1638: Sibylla Schwarz, a young German poet of the baroque era, died of dysentery during the Thirty Year's War in Pommerania at the age of 17.
- 1675: Jacques Marquette died of dysentery on his way north from what is today Chicago, traveling to the mission where he intended to spend the rest of his life.
- 1676: Nathaniel Bacon died of dysentery after taking control of Virginia following Bacon's Rebellion. He is believed to have died in October 1676, allowing Virginia's ruling elite to regain control.
- 1680: Shivaji, founder and ruler of the Maratha Empire of South Asia, died of dysentery on 3 April 1680. In 1680, Shivaji fell ill with fever and dysentery, dying around 3–5 April 1680 at the age of 52 on the eve of Hanuman Jayanti. He was cremated at Raigad Fort, where his Samadhi is built in Mahad, Raigad district of Maharashtra, India.
- 1827: Queen Nandi kaBhebhe, (mother of Shaka Zulu) died of dysentery on 10 October 1827.
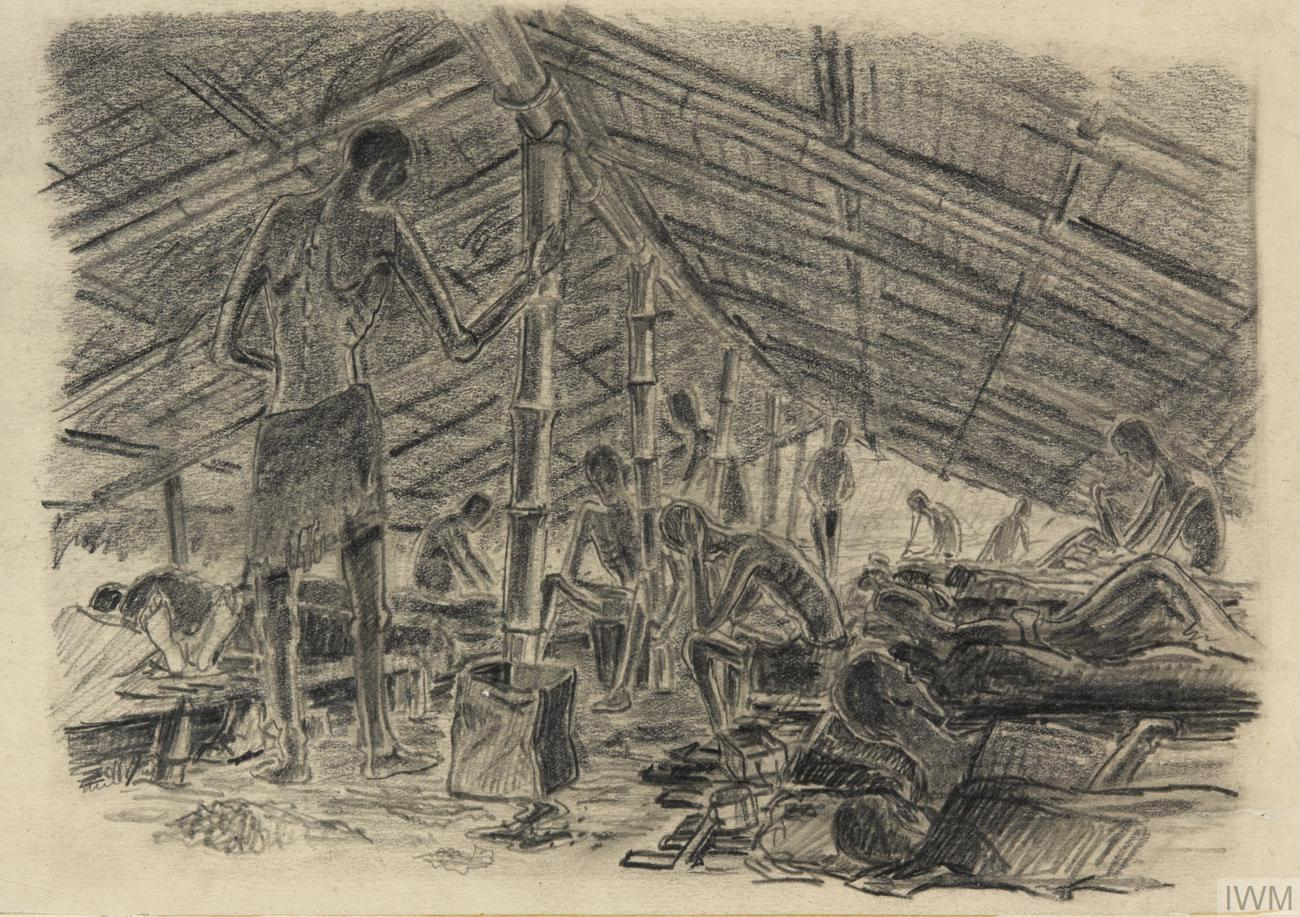
  Allied prisoners of war with dysentery in a Japanese camp in Thailand in 1943
- 1873: The explorer David Livingstone died of dysentery on 1 May 1873.
- 1885: Alfonso XII King of Spain from 29 December 1874 to 25 November 1885 died of dysentery at the age of 27
- 1896: Phan Đình Phùng, a Vietnamese revolutionary who led rebel armies against French colonial forces in Vietnam, died of dysentery as the French surrounded his forces on 21 January 1896.
- 1910: Luo Yixiu, first wife of Mao Zedong, died of dysentery on 11 February 1910. She was 20 years old.
- 1912: Historian Arnold J. Toynbee contracted dysentery on April 26, 1912, from contaminated water in the Peloponnese; the malady led to his being excused from military service in World War I.
- 1930: The French explorer and writer Michel Vieuchange died of dysentery in Agadir on 30 November 1930, on his return from the "forbidden city" of Smara. He was nursed by his brother, Doctor Jean Vieuchange, who was unable to save him. The notebooks and photographs, edited by Jean Vieuchange, went on to become bestsellers.
- 1942: The Selarang Barracks incident in the summer of 1942 during World War II involved the forced crowding of 17,000 Anglo-Australian prisoners-of-war (POWs) by their Japanese captors in the areas around the barracks square for nearly five days with little water and no sanitation after the Selarang Barracks POWs refused to sign a pledge not to escape. The incident ended with the surrender of the Australian commanders due to the spreading of dysentery among their men.

== See also ==
- Cholera
