= Les Pieds Nickelés =

French comic series

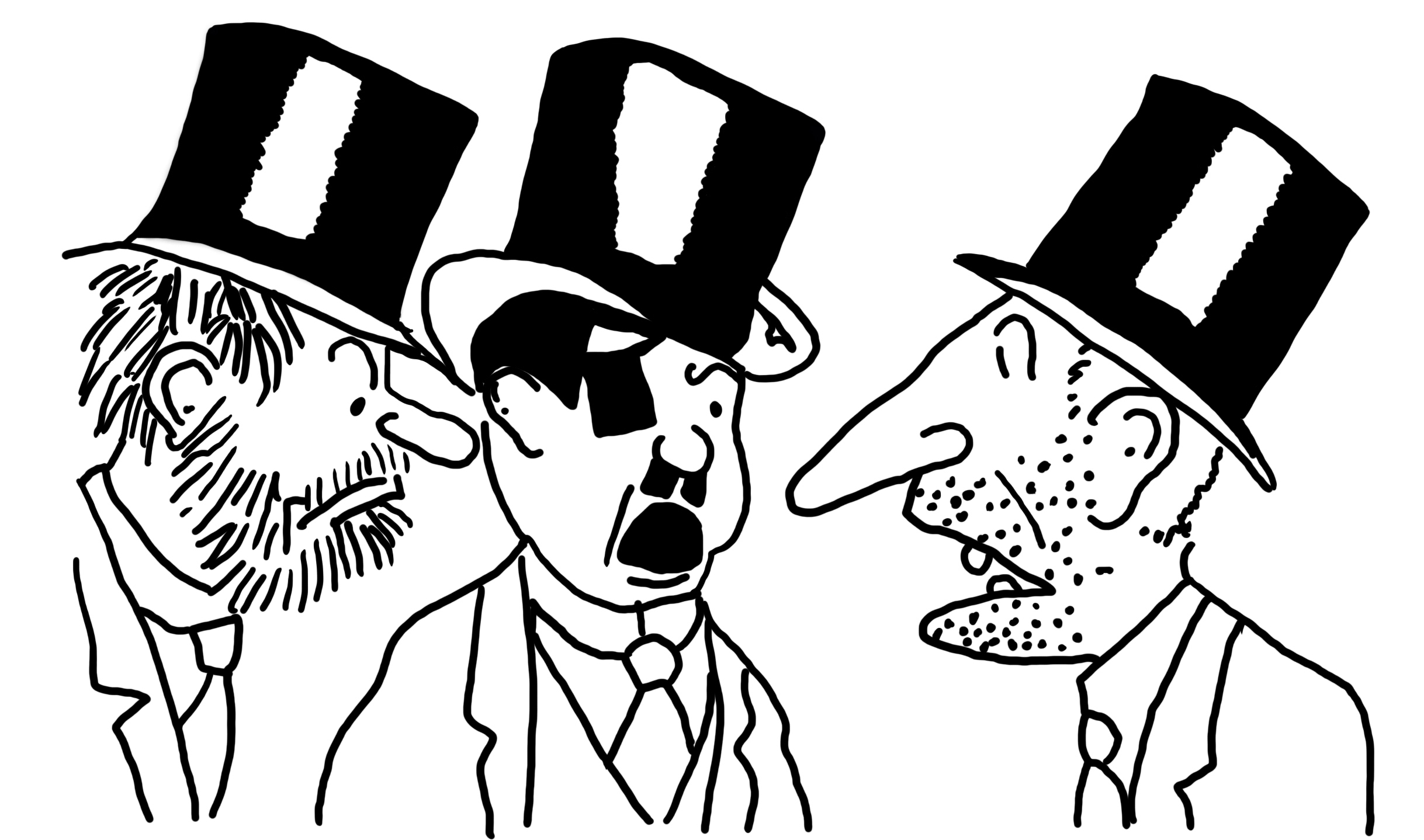
The Pieds Nickelés trio

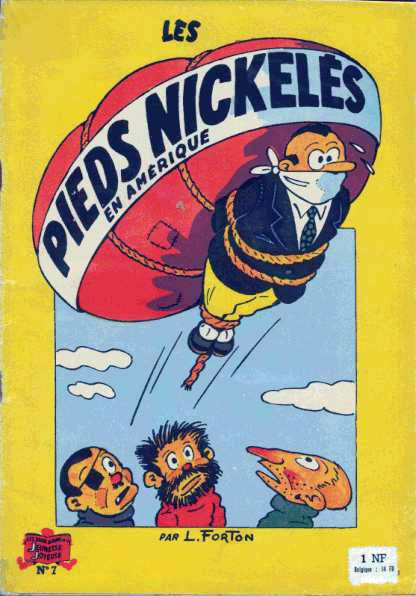
Les Pieds nickelés en Amérique

Les Pieds Nickelés (French for "The nickel plated feet") is a French comic series, originally created by Louis Forton. The comic premiered on June 4, 1908 in the newspaper L'Épatant, published by Société Parisienne d'Édition. It is considered to be one of the earliest French comics and one of the longest-running. It centers on a group of anarchist youth getting in trouble. In French informal speech of the early twentieth century, "nickel-plated feet" was a term for slackers, work-shy people.

== History ==
The story features three main characters named Croquignol, Filochard, and Ribouldingue, three brothers who are good hearted but at the same time are indolent crooks and slackers, characteristics of anarchists.

Les Pieds Nickelés was originally drawn in text comics format, with the text written beneath the images. Louis Forton had to struggle with his editors to use actual speech balloons, as was common in American comics.

At the beginning of their "career", the 'nickel-plated feet' constantly clash with the police in various adventures where they rarely have the upper hand. Gradually, as the comic book became increasingly popular, the Pieds-Nickelés gain widened scope, complexity, and audacity. Over time, they are seen rubbing shoulders with the elite of their time, such as the President of France, the King of England, and the Kaiser of Germany.

With the arrival of the First World War, the personalities of the Pied-Nickelés take a new turn. They embody the popular French values of ingenuity and resourcefulness known as "System D." Operating behind enemy lines under multiple guises, they constantly fool the "Boches" (French derogatory nickname for the Germans), who are portrayed as large, gullible oafs.

Louis Forton continued to draw the Pied Nickelés until his death in 1934, after which the series was taken over by Aristide Perré and Albert Badert. However, it was not until Pellos took over in 1948 that the Nickelés returned to success. The successive authors of the Nickelés thus changed the comics and evolved the comics in new directions.

In 2010, Onapratut published a compilation of the contributions of Michel Baril, Aurélien Bédéneau, Fabien Bertrand, Paul Burckel, Ced, Clotka, Dib, François Duprat, Frédéric Duprat, Elric, Filak, Stéphane Girod and Olivier Ka., Lommsek, Alejandro Milà, Pasto, Radi, Loïc Senan, Thibaut Soulcié, Unter, Waltch, Wayne, Wouzit, Carali, Caza, Hardy, Hugot, Lamorthe, Laurel, Thierry Martin, O'Groj, Obion, Nancy Peña, Jeff Pourquié, Olivier Schwartz, Al Séverin, Walthéry, and Wasterlain. The cover design is the work of Pascal Rabaté.

== Derivatives and parodies ==
In French informal speech of the early twentieth century, "nickel-plated feet" was a moniker for slackers, work-shy people. The meaning extended later to include, in the 21st century, characters not very commendable, conspiracy-minded, roguish, dishonest and clumsy. For example, these characters were referenced by the media in the Clearstream affair to describe the various protagonists. The same was true of the operation of the "Ark of Zoe".

Les Pieds Nickelés also inspired a 1972 magazine in which the cartoonist Régis Loisel made his debut.

In 2011 the cartoonist Luz replaced the headband of the one-eyed character Filochard with adjustable sunglasses.

== Chronology of authors ==
Louis Forton led the publication under a pen name. In 1934, he decided to focus on other projects and let someone else take over.

- Louis Forton (1908-1934), créateur de la série. Louis Tybalt temporarily took over during the First World War.
- Aristide Perré (1936-1938)
- Badert (1940)
- René Pellos (1948-1981) with Roland de Montaubert as principal writer
- Pierre Lacroix (1953-1954)
- Jacarbo (1982-1983) et Serge Saint-Michel (1954-1984)
- Jicka (1984-1988)
- Laval, Claderes, Gen-Clo (1988)

Starting from 1991, a series of new "Pieds Nickeles" to represent the "New Adventures" premiered, a collaboration of multiple publishers.

- Michel Rodrigue (1991-1992) - Les nouvelles aventures des Pieds Nickelés (Studio Cadero - Vents d'Ouest)
- Juillard (1999) - Le dernier chapitre (Tome 3) Les Pieds Nickelés : demain sera un autre jour (Dargaud)
- Trap et Stéphane Oiry (2009) - La Nouvelle Bande des Pieds nickelés (Delcourt)
- Un ouvrage collectif (2010) - Les Nouveaux Pieds nickelés (Onapratut)
- Philippe Riche (2011) (Vents d'Ouest - Georges Ventillard)
- Richard Malka, Ptiluc et Luz (2011) (Vents d'Ouest - Georges Ventillard)
- Corteggiani et Herlé (2012) (éditions de l'Opportun)
- Gérald Forton et Julien Moca (2013) (l'àpart éditions)
- Jihel pour des planches d'hommage tirées à part en sérigraphie pour le support carte postale.
- TIBERI JP (scénario) et Bévé (Dessin) - éditions REGARDS (Les Pieds Nickelés à Manounouland - 2014)
- TIBERI JP (Scénario) et Bévé (Dessin) - éditions REGARDS (Les Pieds Nickelés et le mystère du crâne de cristal - 2015)
- TIBERI JP (Scénario) et Bévé (Dessin) - éditions REGARDS (Les Pieds Nickelés - Aventures dans les îles - 2016)
- TIBERI JP (Scénario) et Bévé (Dessin) - éditions REGARDS (Les pieds Nickelés - Comminges... Nous voilà ! - 2017)

== Main characters ==
The comics center on 3 principal protagonists, Croquignol, Filochard, and Ribouldingue, who evolve greatly over the run of the comics. Under the authorship of Louis Forton, all drawn to the same size and proportions with Croquignol being the leader of the trio. All three, under the purview of Pellos developed their own personalities:

- Ribouldingue is the sympathetic one.
- Filochard: has a small stature; possesses one eye and gains Herculean strength when angry
- Croquignol is a fine person and usually the leader of the band.

Although they disguise themselves regularly, they also have the same recurrent style:

- Croquignol wears the monocle, a small hat, a jacket, and a bow tie;
- Ribouldingue wears the green cap, matching the green sweater, and a red scarf around the neck.
- Filochard wears the beret, a red turtleneck and a black jacket.

Among the recurring characters of the series, one crosses in some episodes:

- Manounou, the African wife of Ribouldingue, an accomplice of the various larcenies of his legitimate and acolytes.

One finds also again, among the traditional foes:

- le commissaire Croquenot
- l'inspecteur Duflair
- Fantômard
- la Clique (autrefois un allié des pieds nickelés, puis le complice de Fantômard)
- les Cagoulards (sbires de Fantômard)

The travels of the Les Pieds Nickelés generally crosses the paths of the rich, the bourgeois, the peasants, who are distinguished by their stupidity and naivety, making them the privileged prey of the nickel-plated feet. The representatives of the public forces are also among the regular characters, regularly in the series of opponents of the three companions.

=== Gallery ===
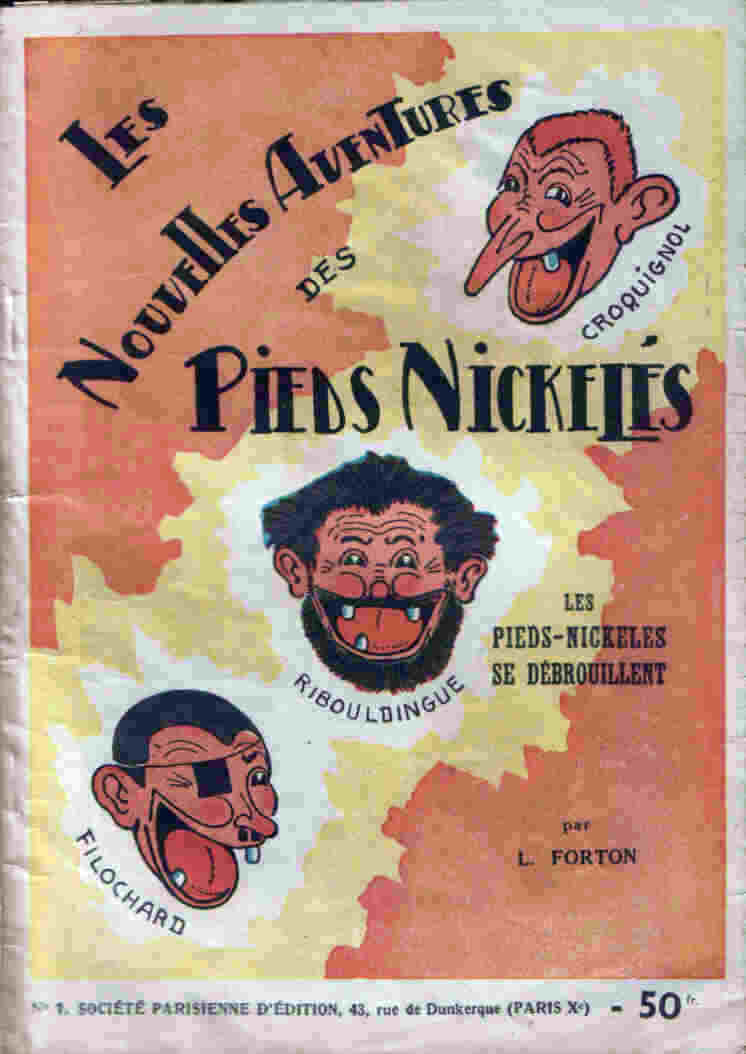

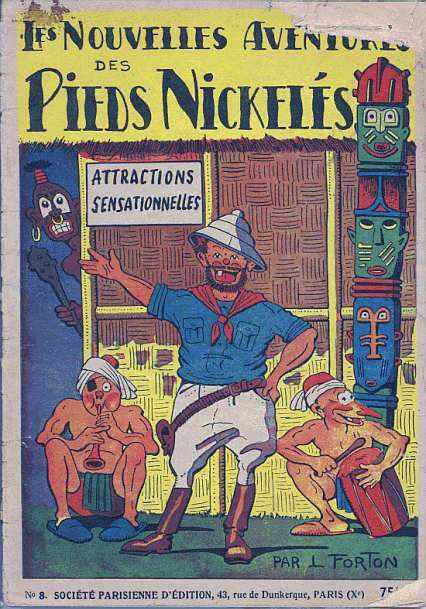

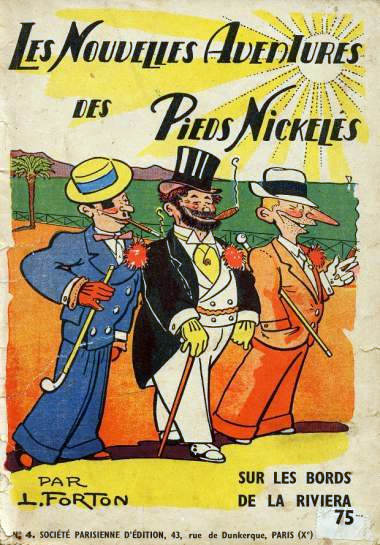

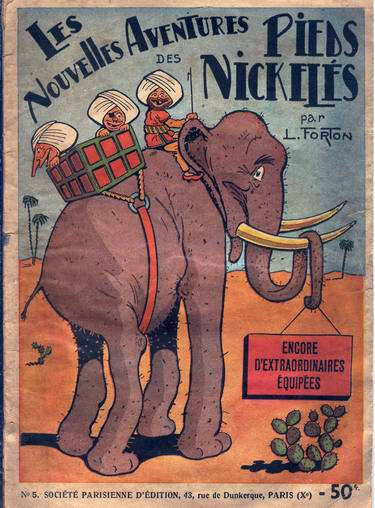

== Albums ==
=== Société Parisienne d'Édition ===
These albums and compilations were published by Société Parisienne d'Édition.

==== Pre-war albums (1929-1940) ====
1. Les Pieds nickelés se débrouillent
2. Toujours de nouveaux exploits
3. Ollé ! Ollé ! Soyons gais !
4. Sur les bords de la Riviera
5. Encore d'extraordinaires équipées
6. L'Audace des Pieds nickelés
7. Les Pieds nickelés en Amérique
8. Attractions sensationnelles
9. Les Pieds nickelés ont le filon
10. La vie est belle
11. Faut pas s'en faire
12. Dans le maquis
13. Les Pieds nickelés ont la guigne !
14. Les Pieds nickelés chez les gangsters
15. Les Pieds nickelés s'évadent
16. Les Pieds nickelés rois du caoutchouc
17. Les Pieds nickelés sous les eaux
18. Les Pieds nickelés radio-reporters
19. Les Pieds nickelés prince d'Orient

==== Post-war albums (1946-1988) ====
These were published by Société Parisienne d'Édition.

(These albums are published in the collection "Les Beaux Albums de la jeunesse joyeuse")

1. Les Pieds nickelés se débrouillent
2. Des exploits formidables
3. Ollé ! Ollé! Soyons gais!
4. Sur les bords de la Riviera
5. Encore d'extraordinaires équipées
6. L'Audace des Pieds nickelés
7. Les Pieds nickelés en Amérique
8. Attractions sensationnelles
9. Les Pieds nickelés sont irrésistibles
10. La vie est belle
11. Les Pieds nickelés ont la belle vie
12. Les Pieds nickelés font fortune
13. Les Pieds nickelés sportifs
14. Les Pieds nickelés dans le maquis
15. Les Pieds nickelés au Colorado
16. Les Pieds nickelés soldats
17. Les Pieds nickelés as du contre-espionnage
18. Les Pieds nickelés au lycée
19. Les Pieds nickelés chercheurs d'or
20. Le Triomphe des Pieds nickelés
21. Les Pieds nickelés industriels
22. Le Trésor des Pieds nickelés
23. Le Rêve des Pieds nickelés
24. Les Pieds nickelés et le Parfum sans nom
25. Les Pieds nickelés et le Ratascaphe
26. Les Pieds nickelés s'évadent
27. Les Pieds nickelés en Angleterre
28. Les Pieds nickelés footballeurs
29. Les Pieds nickelés au Tour de France
30. Les Pieds nickelés en pleine bagarre
31. Les Pieds nickelés à Chicago
32. Les Pieds nickelés contre les gangsters (Les Pieds nickelés détectives privés)
33. Les Pieds nickelés courent la Panasiatique
34. Les Pieds nickelés font boum
35. Les Pieds nickelés en pleine Corrida
36. Les Pieds nickelés aux Jeux olympiques
37. Les Pieds nickelés rois du pétrole
38. Les Pieds nickelés ne veulent pas se faire rouler
39. Les Pieds nickelés super-champions de la pêche
40. Les Pieds nickelés et leur fusée atomique
41. Les Pieds nickelés trappeurs
42. Les Pieds nickelés chez les réducteurs de tête
43. Les Pieds nickelés aux pays des Incas
44. Les Pieds nickelés cinéastes, douaniers, pharmaciens
45. Les Pieds nickelés policiers de la route
46. Les Pieds nickelés diseurs de bonne aventure
47. Les Pieds nickelés au pays des pharaons
48. Les Pieds nickelés et leur soupière volante
49. Les Pieds nickelés journalistes
50. Les Pieds nickelés organisateurs de voyage
51. Les Pieds nickelés sur Bêta 2
52. Les Pieds nickelés tiennent le succès
53. Les Pieds nickelés en plein suspense
54. Les Pieds nickelés agents secrets
55. Les Pieds nickelés sur les trétaux
56. Les Pieds nickelés ministres
57. Les Pieds nickelés voyagent
58. Les Pieds nickelés font du cinéma
59. Les Pieds nickelés contre Croquenot
60. Les Pieds nickelés dans le cambouis
61. Les Pieds nickelés dans l'immobilier
62. Les Pieds nickelés à l'ORTF
63. Les Pieds nickelés campeurs
64. Les Pieds nickelés aux sports d'hiver
65. Les Pieds nickelés se blanchissent
66. Les Pieds nickelés et le contrôle des changes
67. Les Pieds nickelés contre les Pieds nickelés
68. Les Pieds nickelés organisateurs de safaris
69. Les Pieds nickelés cambrioleurs
70. Les Pieds nickelés esthéticiens
71. Les Pieds nickelés hippies
72. Les Pieds nickelés contre les fantômes
73. Les Pieds nickelés sur la route du pétrole
74. Les Pieds nickelés et l'Opération congélation
75. Les Pieds nickelés percepteurs
76. Les Pieds nickelés chez Zigomar II
77. Les Pieds nickelés cascadeurs
78. Les P.N et leur fils adoptif
79. Les Pieds nickelés contre les kidnappeurs (réed. du No. 30)
80. Les Pieds nickelés artisans
81. Les Pieds nickelés justiciers
82. Les Pieds nickelés vétérinaires
83. Les Pieds nickelés à Hollywood
84. Les Pieds nickelés sous-mariniers
85. Les Pieds nickelés gens du voyage
86. Les Pieds nickelés dans le harem
87. Les Pieds nickelés et l'Énergie
88. Les Pieds nickelés sont honnêtes
89. Les Pieds nickelés producteurs
90. Les Pieds nickelés préhistoriens
91. Les Pieds nickelés aux grandes manœuvres
92. Les Pieds nickelés en Guyane
93. Les Pieds nickelés rempilent
94. Les Pieds nickelés à l'Opéra
95. Les Pieds nickelés s'expatrient
96. Les Pieds nickelés en Afrique
97. Les Pieds nickelés réforment
98. Le Casse des Pieds nickelés
99. Les Pieds nickelés profitent des vacances
100. Les Pieds nickelés sportifs
101. Les Pieds nickelés ont de la chance
102. Les Pieds nickelés filoutent
103. Les Pieds nickelés jouent et gagnent
104. Les Pieds nickelés pompiers
105. Les Pieds nickelés au cirque
106. Les Pieds nickelés contre Cognedur
107. Les Pieds nickelés en Auvergne
108. Les Pieds nickelés en Périgord
109. Les Pieds nickelés dans le Grand Nord
110. Les Pieds nickelés Européens
111. Les Pieds nickelés capteurs d'énergie
112. Les Pieds nickelés et le Chanvre berrichon
113. Les Pieds nickelés et le Raid Paris-Tombouctou
114. Les Pieds nickelés banquiers
115. Les Pieds nickelés marins-pêcheurs
116. Les Pieds nickelés vulcanologues
117. Les Pieds nickelés à la Une
118. Les Pieds nickelés toubibs de nuit
119. Les Pieds nickelés et les Loubards
120. Les Pieds nickelés contre la pollution
121. Les Pieds nickelés en voient de toutes les couleurs
122. Les Diamants de l'empereur
123. Les Pieds nickelés sculpteurs
124. Les Pieds nickelés ont de la réserve
125. Les Pieds nickelés et la Dame de fer
126. Les Pieds nickelés font la fête

==== Collections ====
1. Les Pieds nickelés au mondial
2. Les Pieds nickelés et le Club
3. Les Pieds nickelés et le Rallye
4. Les Pieds nickelés karatekas
5. Les Pieds nickelés font le tour
6. Les Pieds nickelés aux jeux

=== Other publications ===
==== Vents d'Ouest ====
(Les Nouvelles Aventures des Pieds nickelés)

1. L'Empire d'essence (1991)
2. Voleur de pub (1991)
3. Flouze artistique (1992)

=== Out of circulation ===
Other publishers have released albums.

1. Les Pieds nickelés dans les Corbières, à Canet-plage, sur le Lydia
2. Les Fourberies des Pieds nickelés
3. Les Pieds nickelés à l'ORTF

=== Derivative works ===
The series have been adapted by other publishers to publish.

- Les Pieds nickelés, une aventure de Croquignol, Filochard & Ribouldingue (2011)

==== Delcourt ====
Titled La Nouvelle Bande des Pieds nickelés

1. Pas si mal logés (2009)
2. Bio-profiteurs (2010)
3. Expulsés volontaires (2012)

==== Onapratut ====
- Les Nouveaux Pieds nickelés (2010)

==== De Varly Éditions ====
1. Les Pieds nickelés se débrouillent (1929-2011)
2. Toujours de nouveaux exploits (1929-2012)
3. Le Roman des Pieds nickelés T3 (1914-2011)
4. Biographie de Forton, l'histoire par la bande (2011)

==== Glénat ====
1. Promoteurs du paradis (2011)

==== Éditions de l'Opportun ====
1. Ensemble, tout est possible (2012)

==== Éditions l'Àpart ====
1. Les Pieds Nickelés visitent les châteaux de la Loire (2013)

==== Vents d'Ouest ====
(Le Meilleur des Pieds nickelés)

1. Menteurs, Voleurs, Bagarreurs... de vrais professionnels !
2. Embrouilles, Arnaques et Cocards... l'aventure continue !
3. Tricheurs, Hâbleurs, Manipulateurs... les affaires reprennent !
4. Impostures, Esbroufes et Grosses Galères... les rebelles courent toujours !
5. Taloches, Traquenards et P'tites Combines... les Pieds nickelés mettent les gaz !
6. Crocs-en-jambes et Coups fourrés... les Pieds nickelés champions de l'embrouille
7. 100 ans... le Meilleur des Pieds Nickelés
8. Ramdam, Magouilles et Castagnes... les Pieds nickelés mettent les bouts !
9. Bousculés, chahutés, malmenés... mais jamais désarçonnés !

==== Éditions REGARDS ====
1. Les Pieds Nickelés à Manounouland
2. Le mystère du crâne de cristal
3. Aventures dans les îles.
4. Comminges... Nous voilà !

== Bibliography ==
- Jean-Paul Tibéri, Les Pieds nickelés, SEDLI, coll.« Dossiers BD », 1984. Réédition partielle Vents d'Ouest, 1996.
