= Jicka =

Jacques Kalaydjian
- Born: 1 January 1926
- Died: 15 May 2005 (aged 79); Normandy, France
- Notable work: Les Pieds Nickelés

Jacques Kalaydjian (1 January 1926, Le Raincy, Paris, France – 15 May 2005) was a French artist and cartoonist of Armenian origin that was creating under the name of Jicka. From 1984 to 1988 he was the author of Les Pieds Nickelés.
