= Gérald Forton =

French comic book artist (1931–2021)

- Born: 10 April 1931; Brussels, Belgium
- Died: 16 December 2021 (aged 90)
- Occupation: Comic book artist

Gérald Forton (10 April 1931 – 16 December 2021) was a Belgian-born French comic book artist. He was the grandson of Louis Forton, creator of Les Pieds Nickelés.

== Life and career ==
In 1950, Forton wrote his first short stories in Caméra 34. In 1951, he illustrated Jim Cartouche. The following year, he began illustrating the series L'oncle Paul for Spirou. In 1953, he created Kim Devil alongside author Jean-Michel Charlier. From 1955 to 1956, he illustrated Le garage bleu and the adventures of Alain Cardan in Risque-Tout. Throughout the 1960s, he illustrated multiple influential comic series in the Francophone world, such as Grégory le Marin, Roch Rafal, and Blake and Mortimer. In 1977, he participated in the Histoire de France en bandes dessinées and illustrated Les Mystères de l'Ouest. He also illustrated the French versions of several Marvel Comics, such as Spider-Man, Thor, the Hulk, Captain America, and the Fantastic Four. From 1978 to 1981, he published multiple comics based on the works of Michel Roquebert for Éditions Loubatières. In the 1980s, he collaborated with DC Comics, Eclipse Comics, and First Comics.

Alongside his activities as a cartoonist, Forton participated in the storyboards for the animated series The Legend of Prince Valiant. He returned to the Franco-Belgian comics scene with Semic Comics in the early 2000s. In 2013, he revived his grandfather's series Les Pieds Nickelés in collaboration with Julien Moca and Éditions l'Apart. In 2017, he illustrated a new edition of the Teddy Ted series, Teddy Ted 1899, more than forty years after the series' last publication in Pif Gadget.

Forton died on 16 December 2021, at the age of 90.
