= Smara =

Smara السمارة Esmara
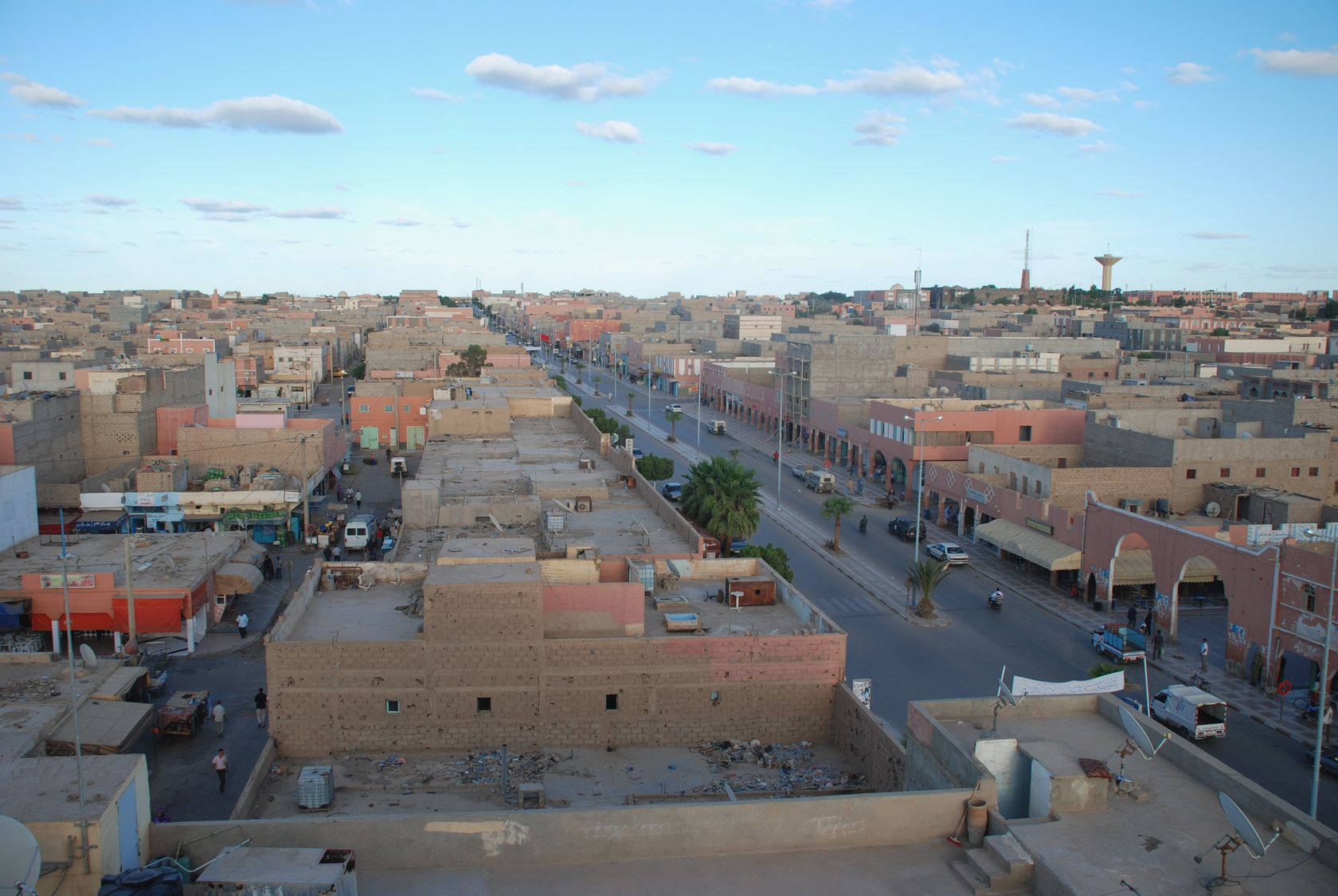

- Location in Western Sahara
- Coordinates: 26°44′22″N 11°40′13″W
- Non-self-governing territory: Western Sahara
- Claimed by: Morocco; Sahrawi Arab Democratic Republic
- Controlled by: Morocco
- Region: Laâyoune-Sakia El Hamra
- Province: Es Semara
- Founded: 1898
- Founder: Ma al-'Aynayn

Area
  - Total: 69.72 km^{2} (26.92 sq mi)

Population (2014)
  - Total: 57,035
  - Density: 818.1/km^{2} (2,119/sq mi)
- Time zone: UTC+0 (GMT)

Smāra (also romanized Semara, Arabic: السمارة, Hassaniyya: [(ə)s.smaːra]; Spanish: Esmara) is a city in Western Sahara, with a population of 57,035 recorded in the 2014 Moroccan census. It is served by Smara Airport and Smara bus station.

== History ==
The largest city in its province, Smara, was founded in the Saguia el-Hamra as an oasis for travellers in 1898. In the center of the city, the remains of a stone fortress can be found, the Zawiy Maalainin, which enclosed a mosque. It was made a capital and religious center in 1902 by shaykh Ma al-'Aynayn, in what was then claimed as the Spanish Sahara. The location of the city was intended to ensure its becoming a caravan trade hub in the sparsely populated Sahara desert. The enlargement of Smara was carried out by local Sahrawis as well as craftsmen sent by the sultan Hassan I of Morocco. Among other things, he created an important Islamic library, and the town became a center of religious learning.

In 1904 the shaykh declared himself an imam and called for holy war (jihad) against French colonialism, which was increasingly pressing into the Sahara at this time. During the campaign against Ma al-'Aynayn, Smara was sacked almost completely in 1913 by the French Army, and its library destroyed. The town was then handed over to the Spanish. In 1934 the town was once again destroyed after Sahrawi rebellions against the Spanish occupation.

=== The Vieuchange brothers ===
Reaching Ma al-'Aynayn's mysterious Smara was the goal of the brothers Vieuchange, early 20th-century French writers and romantics. Michel Vieuchange's painful journey through the rebel-held Sahrawi lands in 1930 disguised as a Berber tribeswoman, eventually reaching Smara on 1 November 1930, and the dysentery that led to his death on the return, is documented in his journals. Comprising seven notebooks and more than 200 photographs, the account was published posthumously in 1932 as Smara: The Forbidden City (1932) by his brother Jean and became a bestseller.

=== After 1975 ===
In 1975, Morocco took control of Saguia Elhamra as Spain withdrew, according to the Madrid Accords. The Moroccan army took the city from the Polisario Front in 1976. Near Tindouf, Algeria, there still exists a Sahrawi refugee camp named after Smara. It is one of the four camps of the Sahrawi Arab Democratic Republic administration in Algeria.

== Climate ==
Climate data for Smara (1991–2020)
Month	Jan	Feb	Mar	Apr	May	Jun	Jul	Aug	Sep	Oct	Nov	Dec	Year
Record high °C (°F)	33.0 (91.4)	37.3 (99.1)	39.5 (103.1)	41.6 (106.9)	45.6 (114.1)	47.5 (117.5)	49.0 (120.2)	48.9 (120.0)	46.8 (116.2)	44.6 (112.3)	38.7 (101.7)	33.3 (91.9)	49.0 (120.2)
Mean daily maximum °C (°F)	23.2 (73.8)	25.0 (77.0)	27.7 (81.9)	29.0 (84.2)	30.9 (87.6)	33.0 (91.4)	36.9 (98.4)	38.0 (100.4)	34.5 (94.1)	31.6 (88.9)	27.5 (81.5)	24.2 (75.6)	30.1 (86.2)
Daily mean °C (°F)	16.6 (61.9)	18.4 (65.1)	20.6 (69.1)	22.0 (71.6)	23.7 (74.7)	25.7 (78.3)	28.7 (83.7)	29.7 (85.5)	27.4 (81.3)	25.0 (77.0)	21.2 (70.2)	17.9 (64.2)	23.1 (73.6)
Mean daily minimum °C (°F)	10.0 (50.0)	11.8 (53.2)	13.6 (56.5)	14.9 (58.8)	16.4 (61.5)	18.4 (65.1)	20.4 (68.7)	21.4 (70.5)	20.2 (68.4)	18.4 (65.1)	14.8 (58.6)	11.5 (52.7)	16.0 (60.8)
Record low °C (°F)	3.0 (37.4)	4.4 (39.9)	7.4 (45.3)	9.9 (49.8)	10.6 (51.1)	13.1 (55.6)	13.6 (56.5)	14.7 (58.5)	12.5 (54.5)	12.3 (54.1)	6.4 (43.5)	5.4 (41.7)	3.0 (37.4)
Average precipitation mm (inches)	2.9 (0.11)	4.1 (0.16)	2.2 (0.09)	0.8 (0.03)	0.6 (0.02)	1.1 (0.04)	0.8 (0.03)	2.8 (0.11)	6.9 (0.27)	5.3 (0.21)	3.8 (0.15)	3.2 (0.13)	34.5 (1.36)
Average precipitation days (≥ 1.0 mm)	0.8	0.7	0.6	0.2	0.1	0.2	0.2	0.6	0.8	0.8	0.5	0.7	6.2
Source: NOAA

== Transport ==
CTM and Supratours companies have daily travels from Smara to Marrakech. Satas have daily travel from Smara to Agadir. Supratours have daily travel from Smara to Laayoune.

== Notable people ==
- Brahim Ghali, 3rd President of the Sahrawi Arab Democratic Republic
- Fatma El Mehdi, activist, secretary general of the National Union of Sahrawi Women

== See also ==
- Battle of Smara (1979)

== Notes and References ==
=== References ===
- Vieuchange, Michel (1988) [1932]. Smara: The Forbidden City. Fletcher Allen, Edgar (translation); Vieuchange, Jean (editor; introduction, notes, postscript); Claudel, Paul (preface). (Reprinted ed.). New York: Ecco. ISBN 978-0-88001-146-4.
