= Adolphe Barreaux =

American writer, artist and publisher (1899–1985)

Adolphe Leslie de Griponne Barreaux, Jr. (Charleston, January 9, 1899 – New York City, October 23, 1985), professionally credited as Adolphe Barreaux, was an African-American writer, artist and publisher during the height of pulp magazines in the 1930s and during the Golden Age of Comics.

A graduate of Yale School of Art, Barreaux worked for the publisher Harry Donenfeld at National Allied Publications, writing and drawing for magazines such as Spicy Adventure, Spicy Detective and Spicy Mystery. He worked mainly in the detective fiction genre and sometimes under pseudonyms such as Charles Barr. He created properties such as Sally the Sleuth (a successful adult strip later continued by Keats Petree) and The Enchanted Stone of Time, and was the first artist to draw Dan Turner, Hollywood Detective. At his personal studio, Majestic Studios, his team supplied the art for Olga Mesmer, a strip credited as an early precursor to modern superheroes. In 1935, Barreaux created a one-page story for the first title ever published by DC Comics, New Fun Comics #1, a contribution now noted by the company as a milestone for Black comics creators.

During the Golden Age of Comics he created or contributed to titles such as The Black Spider, The Raven, The Magic Crystal of History, Tad Among the Pirates, Enchanted Stone, Flip Falcon, Patty O'Day, The Blazing Scarab, and The Dragon's Teeth. After his comics career he became an editor and illustrator for Fawcett Publications and others.

== Bibliography ==
- Goulart, Ron. "Comic Book Culture": An Illustrated History. CollectorsPress, 2000. ISBN 1-888054-38-7. p. 26
