= Jean Vieuchange =

French travel writer

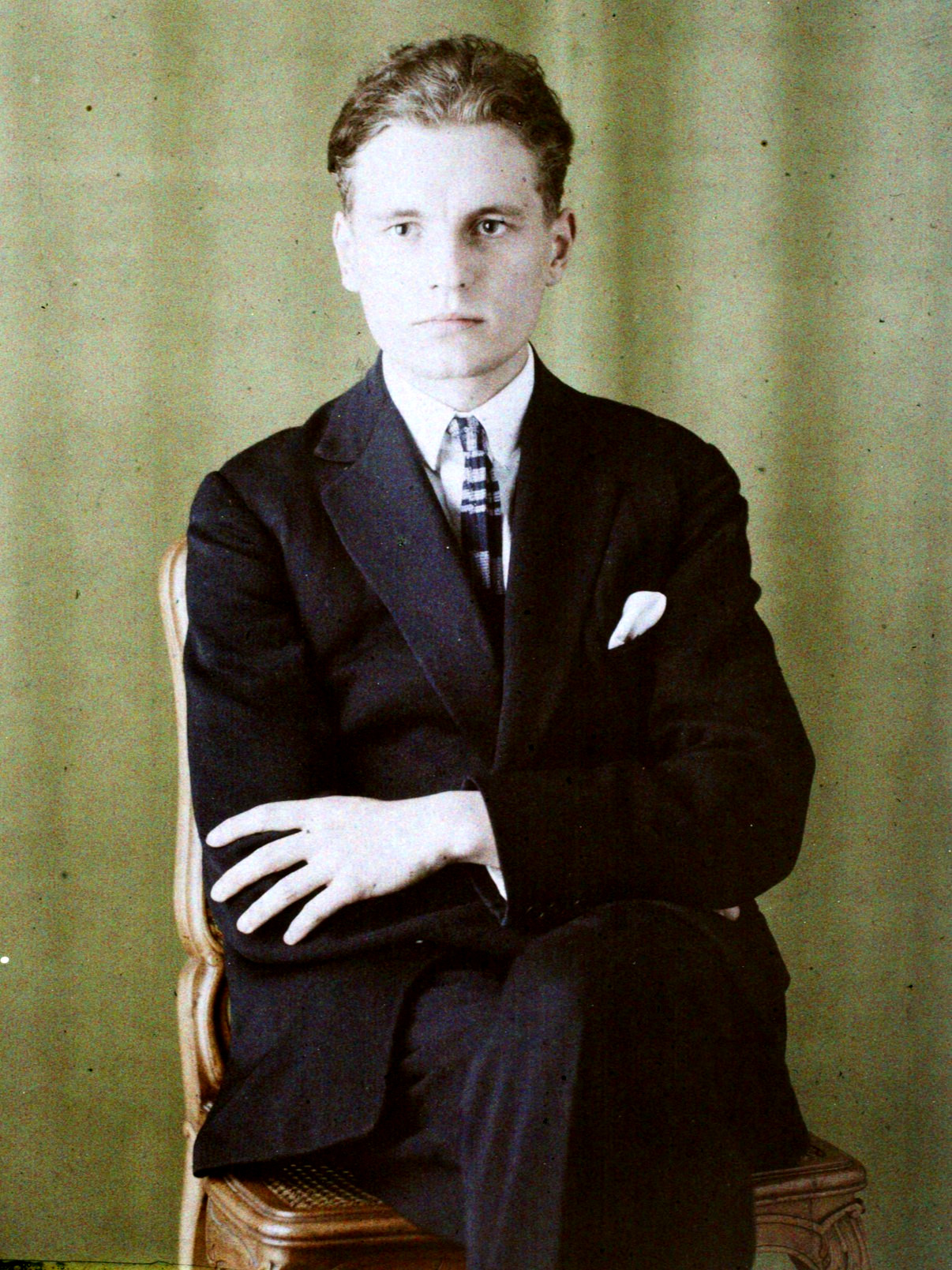
Autochrome portrait by Georges Chevalier, 1928

Jean Joseph Marie Vieuchange (1906–2003) was a French adventurer and medical doctor, best known for preparing for publication the hand-written notebooks of his brother, Michel, describing his discovery of Smara in the Western Sahara in November 1930.

Vieuchange was born in 1906 into a comfortable middle-class family in Nevers, France, the youngest of three children. His sister, Germaine, was born in 1901 and his brother, Michel, in 1904. In 1922, the family moved to Paris, where Vieuchange enrolled as a law student at the Sorbonne; finding law tedious he transferred to medicine three years later.

During 1929 and 1930, he was involved in the planning his brother's journey to Smara and moved to Essaouira in Morocco in August 1930 with the intention of travelling with him. At the last moment, following advice from Caïd Haddou, a local tribal leader, the brothers decided that Vieuchange would stay behind ready to mount a rescue mission should Michel fall ill, be injured or be taken hostage, during the perilous journey. During his return journey from Smara, Michel fell ill with dysentery and Vieuchange rushed to meet him, arranging his evacuation by aircraft to Agadir, and hospitalisation in the little clinic within the casbah. He stayed by Michel's side, nursing him around the clock, until he died, on 30 November 1930. Before his death, Michel entrusted his seven notebooks and over two hundred photographs to Jean. Over the next eighteen months, Vieuchange prepared the notebooks for publication, with extensive editing, preparation of footnotes and a postscript. He also prepared a detailed map of Michel's route, built from the notebooks. Extracts were serialised in numerous reviews and journals, the first appearing in La Vigie marocaine on 21–27 March 1931, headlined "Voir Smara et mourir" (English: "See Smara and die"). It was finally published as a book in 1932, in Paris and New York.

Vieuchange subsequently renewed his medical studies, before embarking on a career focusing on medical research. He worked at the Institut Pasteur in Paris as a microbiologist and was appointed laboratory chief in 1947. Among other things, he was part of the team that developed aluminium phosphate in suspension as an antacid, under the trade name, Phosphalugel. In 1955, he was awarded a research grant by the Rockefeller Foundation, with a two-year secondment to Caltech. He was appointed a chevalier ("knight") of the Legion of Honour on 17 April 2003.

In addition to the book, he wrote extensively about different aspects of his brother's journey for learned societies as well as publishing specialist medical papers.

He died in Paris in 2003.

== Notes and bibliography ==
Notes

Bibliography

- Meaux, Antoine de (2004). L'ultime désert: vie et mort de Michel Vieuchange (in French). Paris: Éditions Phébus. ISBN 978-2-85940-997-5.
- Vieuchange, Michel (1988) [1932]. Smara: The Forbidden City. Fletcher Allen, Edgar (translation); Vieuchange, Jean (editor; introduction, notes, postscript); Claudel, Paul (preface). (Reprinted ed.). New York: Ecco. ISBN 978-0-88001-146-4.
- Vieuchange, Michel (1932a). Chez les dissidents du Sud marocain et du Rio de Oro (in French). Vieuchange, Jean (editor; introduction, notes, postscript, map); Claudel, Paul (preface). Paris: Plon.
- Vieuchange, Michel (1932b). Smara: The Forbidden City. Fletcher Allen, Edgar (translation); Vieuchange, Jean (editor; introduction, notes, postscript); Claudel, Paul (preface). New York: W. W. Norton.
- Vieuchange, Michel (1931). Vieuchange, Jean (ed.). "Le raid héroïque de Michel Vieuchange à Smara". Sciences et voyages (in French). Paris: Société Parisienne d'Édition. In five parts, weekly: 31 Dec 1931–28 Jan 1932. Part I: issue 644, 31 Dec 1931, pp 7–10. Part II: issue 645, 7 Jan 1932, pp 7–10. Part III: issue 645, 14 Jan 1932, pp 13–16. Part IV: issue 647, 21 Jan 1932, pp 7–10. Part V: issue 648, 28 Jan 1932, pp 3–5.
- Vieuchange, Michel (2004) [1932]. Smara: Carnets de route d'un fou du désert (in French). Vieuchange, Jean (editor; introduction, notes, postscript); Claudel, Paul (preface) (Revised ed.). Paris: Phébus. ISBN 978-2-85940-998-2.
- Monod, Théodore (1933). "Notes bibliographiques sur le Sahara occidental". Journal de la Société des Africanistes (in French). 3 (3–1). Paris: Persée: 129–196.
- Levaditi, Jean; Vieuchange, Jean (1972). "Marcel Baltazard et les Instituts Pasteur de Paris et de Casablanca". Bulletin de la Société de pathologie exotique (in French). 65 (2).
- Pournaki, R; Vieuchange, J; Lepine, P; Fasquelle, R (1964). "Isolement d'un virus distinct du virus vaccinal au cours de passages d'une lymphe vaccinale de genisse". Annales de l'Institut Pasteur (in French). 107.
- "Décret du 17 avril 2003 portant promotion et nomination" (in French). Secrétariat général du Gouvernement. 20 April 2003.
- "Rockefeller Foundation Annual Report" (PDF). Rockefeller Foundation. 1955.
- "Bulletin of the California Institute of Technology: Catalogue 1955–56" (PDF). California Institute of Technology. 1956.
