= Bibi Fricotin =

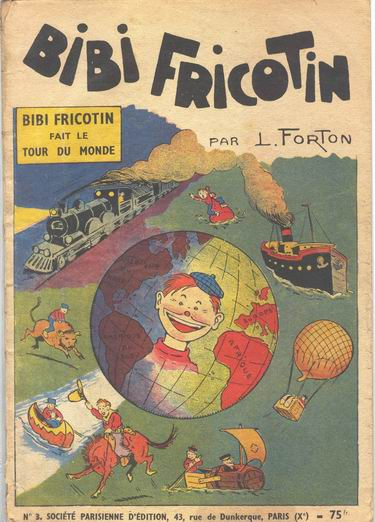
Bibi Fricotin

Bibi Fricotin is a 1924 French comic strip series, drawn by Louis Forton, who also made Les Pieds Nickelés. The first panels appeared on 5 October 1924 in Le Petit Illustré, published by La Société parisienne d' édition.

== Character ==
Bibi Fricotin is a young boy who goes on exotic adventures that make him travel across the world. The series was drawn by Louis Forton from 1924 until his death in 1934. Two years later Gaston Callaud continued the comic until the outbreak of World War II. The volumes he drew, numbers 8 to 12, are nowadays lost and highly sought by collectors. After the liberation, in 1947, Pierre Lacroix continued the series. He gave Bibi a sidekick: the black boy Razibus Zouzou, whom Bibi met in the story "Bibi Fricotin nouveau Robinson" (1950). Lacroix was assisted by writers such as Maric, René Lortac and Roland De Montaubert and drew the series until 1988.

== Film adaptation ==
The series was popular enough to spawn a movie adaptation in 1950: Bibi Fricotin.

== Albums ==
=== By Louis Forton ===
- Album 1 : La vocation de Bibi Fricotin (1928)
- Album 2 : Bibi Fricotin fait des farces (1928)
- Album 3 : Bibi Fricotin fait le tour du monde (1930)
- Album 4 : Bibi Fricotin boit l'obstacle (1931)
- Album 5 : Bibi triomphe (1933)
- Album 6 : Bibi Fricotin détective (1934)
- Album 7 : Bibi Fricotin roi des débrouillards (1935)

=== By Gaston Callaud ===
- Album 8 : Bibi Fricotin au Pôle Nord (1936)
- Album 9 : Bibi Fricotin contre Dédé Tapdur (1937)
- Album 10 : Bibi Fricotin grande vedette (1938)
- Album 11 : Bibi Fricotin chez les Chinois (1940)
- Album 12 : Bibi Fricotin globe-trotter (1941)

=== By Pierre Lacroix ===
- Album 13 : Bibi Fricotin n'a peur de rien (1947) scenario Corrald
- Album 14 : Bibi Fricotin fait du cinéma (1948) scenario René Lortac
- Album 15 : Bibi Fricotin aux Jeux Olympiques (1948) scenario Debois
- Album 16 : Bibi Fricotin sur le « Black Bird » (1948) scenario Debois
- Album 17 : Bibi Fricotin inventeur (1949) scenario René Lortac
- Album 18 : Bibi Fricotin roi de la publicité (1949) scenario René Lortac
- Album 19 : Bibi Fricotin jockey (1950)
- Album 20 : Bibi Fricotin aviateur (1950) scenario Debois
- Album 21 : Bibi Fricotin président de Bibiville (1950) scenario Debois
- Album 22 : Bibi Fricotin cowboy (1950)
- Album 23 : Bibi Fricotin nouveau Robinson (1951) scenario Debois
- Album 24 : Bibi Fricotin chercheur d'or (1951) scenario Roland de Montaubert
- Album 25 : Bibi Fricotin policier (1952) scenario Roland de Montaubert
- Album 26 : Bibi Fricotin et le diamant vert (1952) scenario René Lortac
- Album 27 : Bibi Fricotin et les faux tableaux (1953) scenario René Lortac
- Album 28 : Bibi Fricotin et le testament mystérieux (1953) scenario René Lortac
- Album 29 : Bibi Fricotin et le bathyscaphe (1953) scenario René Lortac
- Album 30 : Bibi Fricotin et l'invention du Buldoflorin (1954)
- Album 31 : Bibi Fricotin roi du scooter (1955) scenario René Lortac
- Album 32 : Bibi Fricotin pilote d'essais (1956) scenario René Lortac
- Album 33 : Bibi Fricotin et le supertempostat (1956) scenario René Lortac
- Album 34 : Bibi Fricotin chez les Incas (1956) scenario Roland de Montaubert
- Album 35 : Bibi Fricotin As du Far-west (1956) scenario Roland de Montaubert
- Album 36 : Bibi Fricotin roi des camelots (1956) scenario Roland de Montaubert
- Album 37 : Bibi Fricotin chasseur de fauves (1956) scenario René Lortac
- Album 38 : Bibi Fricotin contre les kidnappeurs (1957) scenario Roland de Montaubert
- Album 39 : Bibi Fricotin champion du système D (1957) scenario Roland de Montaubert
- Album 40 : Bibi Fricotin et l'homme aux cheveux rouges (1958) scenario Raymond Maric
- Album 41 : Bibi Fricotin et le frigo mondial (1958)
- Album 42 : Bibi Fricotin et les lunettes à lire la pensée (1958) scenario René Lortac
- Album 43 : Bibi Fricotin naufragé volontaire (1958) scenario René Lortac
- Album 44 : Bibi Fricotin et la statuette ensorcelée (1958) scenario Roland de Montaubert
- Album 45 : Bibi Fricotin et les soucoupes volantes (1959)
- Album 46 : Bibi Fricotin et les martiens (1959) scenario René Lortac
- Album 47 : Bibi Fricotin contre l'homme masqué (1959) scenario Raymond Maric
- Album 48 : Bibi Fricotin et le satellite artificiel (1960)
- Album 49 : Bibi Fricotin As du volant (1960) scenario René Lortac
- Album 50 : Bibi Fricotin en plein mystère (1961) scenario Raymond Maric
- Album 51 : Bibi Fricotin chasse le Yéti (1961) scenario René Lortac
- Album 52 : Bibi Fricotin à Hassi Messaoud (1962) scenario Raymond Maric
- Album 53 : Bibi Fricotin et le secret de la momie (1962) scenario Roland de Montaubert
- Album 54 : Bibi Fricotin et le Nautilus (1962) scenario René Lortac
- Album 55 : Bibi Fricotin sème le bonheur (1962)
- Album 56 : Bibi Fricotin chez les Aztèques (1962) scenario Raymond Maric
- Album 57 : Bibi Fricotin et le dernier des Mohicans (1962) scenario Roland de Montaubert
- Album 58 : Bibi Fricotin roi du karting (1962) scenario Raymond Maric
- Album 59 : La surprenante croisière de Bibi Fricotin (1963) scenario Raymond Maric
- Album 60 : Bibi Fricotin et la machine KB x Z2 (1963)
- Album 61 : Bibi Fricotin spéléologue (1963) scenario Raymond Maric
- Album 62 : Bibi Fricotin en l'an 3000 (1963) scenario René Lortac
- Album 63 : Bibi Fricotin découvre l'Atlantide (1963) scenario René Lortac
- Album 64 : Bibi Fricotin reporter (1963) scenario René Lortac
- Album 65 : Bibi Fricotin chez les chevaliers de la Table Ronde (1963) scenario Raymond Maric
- Album 66 : Bibi Fricotin a du flair
- Album 67 : Bibi Fricotin et son ami Kryk (1964) scenario Roland de Montaubert
- Album 68 : Bibi Fricotin aux jeux olympiques (1964) scenario Roland de Montaubert
- Album 69 : Bibi Fricotin forain (1965) scenario Roland de Montaubert
- Album 70 : Bibi Fricotin et la pipe royale (1965) scenario Roland de Montaubert
- Album 71 : Les enquêtes de Bibi Fricotin (1966)
- Album 72 : Bibi Fricotin campeur (1967) scenario Roland de Montaubert, Jacques Veissid
- Album 73 : Bibi Fricotin déménageur (1967) scenario Roland de Montaubert, Jacques Veissid
- Album 74 : Bibi Fricotin super vendeur (1968) scenario Roland de Montaubert, Jacques Veissid
- Album 75 : Bibi Fricotin et ses 36 métiers (1968) scenario René Lortac
- Album 76 : Bibi Fricotin inspecteur de police (1968) scenario Roland de Montaubert
- Album 77 : Bibi Fricotin comédien errant (1969) scenario René Lortac
- Album 78 : Bibi Fricotin as de la vente (1969) scenario Jacques Veissid
- Album 79 : Bibi Fricotin garçon de café (1970) scenario Jacques Veissid
- Album 80 : Bibi Fricotin roi de la plage (1970) scenario Roland de Montaubert
- Album 81 : Bibi Fricotin clerc d'huissier (1971) scenario Jacques Veissid
- Album 82 : Bibi Fricotin en vacances (1971) scenario Jacques Veissid
- Album 83 : Bibi Fricotin à la pêche (1971) scenario Raymond Maric
- Album 84 : Bibi Fricotin colporteur (1972) scenario Jacques Veissid
- Album 85 : Bibi Fricotin antiquaire (1972) scenario Roland de Montaubert
- Album 86 : Bibi Fricotin plombier (1973) scenario Roland de Montaubert
- Album 87 : Bibi Fricotin pilote privé (1973) scenario Patrice Valli
- Album 88 : Bibi Fricotin contre les braconniers (1973) scenario Roland de Montaubert
- Album 89 : Bibi Fricotin en Amérique du Sud (1974) scenario Roland de Montaubert
- Album 90 : Bibi Fricotin pâtissier (1974) scenario Pateloux
- Album 91 : Bibi Fricotin en Inde (1974), scenario Raymond Maric
- Album 92 : Bibi Fricotin et le corbeau (1975)
- Album 93 : Bibi Fricotin protège la nature (1975) scenario Raymond Maric
- Album 94 : Bibi Fricotin une brosse au poil (1975) scenario Raymond Maric
- Album 95 : Bibi Fricotin contre Grandemonio (1975) scenario Charles Ewald
- Album 96 : Bibi Fricotin et l'aile volante (1976) scenario Roland de Montaubert
- Album 97 : Bibi Fricotin en Australie (1976) scenario Pierre Florent
- Album 98 : Les astuces de Bibi Fricotin (1976) scenario Roland de Montaubert
- Album 99 : Bibi Fricotin en Laponie (1976) scenario Roland de Montaubert
- Album 100 : Bibi Fricotin et les inventions du professeur Radar (1976) scenario Raymond Maric
- Album 101 : Bibi Fricotin à Londres (1976) scenario Roland de Montaubert
- Album 102 : L'enquête éclair (1976) scenario Raymond Maric
- Album 103 : Bibi Fricotin au supermarché (1977) scenario Roland de Montaubert
- Album 104 : Bibi Fricotin Contre Ya (1977) scenario Roland de Montaubert
- Album 105 : Bibi Fricotin Mousquetaire (1977) scenario Roland de Montaubert
- Album 106 : L'homme perdu (1978) scenario Janoti
- Album 107 : Bibi Fricotin et Razibus font du sport (1978)
- Album 108 : Les exploits de Bibi Fricotin (1979)
- Album 109 : Bibi Fricotin et Razibus font des blagues (1979) scenario Raymond Maric
- Album 110 : Un repos mérité (1980) scenario Janoti
- Album 111 : Bibi Fricotin connait la musique (1980) scenario Janoti
- Album 112 : Bibi Fricotin et son supermaran (1980) scenario Roland de Montaubert
- Album 113 : Bibi Fricotin contre superbig (1980) scenario Janoti
- Album 114 : Bibi Fricotin et le monstre du Loch Ness (1981)
- Album 115 : Bibi Fricotin en Alaska (1983) scenario Roland de Montaubert
- Album 116 : Bibi Fricotin et les U.L.M. (1984) scenario Roland de Montaubert
- Album 117 : Bibi Fricotin roi du tennis-food (1984) scenario André Manguin
- Album 118 : Le tour de France a disparu (1985) scenario Manguin
- Album 119 : Bibi Fricotin au carnaval de Rio (1986) scenario Manguin
- Album 120 : Bibi Fricotin fait du jogging (1987) scenario Manguin
- Album 121 : roi de l'illusion (1988) scenario Manguin
- Album 122 : Razibus a disparu (1988) scenario Jean-Paul Tibéri

=== Compléments ===
- Album 123 : Bibi Fricotin et les sumos (2003) scenario André Manguin drawings Claude Turier edited by the club des Pieds Nickelés (100 copies)
- Album 124 : Bibi Fricotin garçon de ranch (2005) unknown scenarist, drawings by Pierre Lacroix edited by the club des Pieds Nickelés (75 copies)

=== Compilations ===
- Album 1 : Le Meilleur de Bibi Fricotin (Bibi Fricotin en l'an 3000, Bibi Fricotin et ses 36 métiers, Bibi Fricotin connaît la musique)
- Album 2 : Le Meilleur de Bibi Fricotin (Bibi Fricotin policier, Bibi Fricotin aux Jeux olympiques, Bibi Fricotin et le fantôme)
