= Olga Mesmer =

American comic strip character

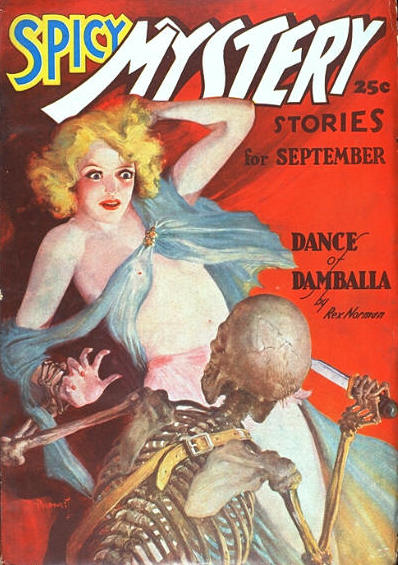
Cover of the pulp magazine Spicy Mystery Stories (Sept. 1937), which introduced the feature "Olga Mesmer, The Girl with the X-ray Eyes"

Olga Mesmer is a superpowered fictional character in a pulp magazine's comic strip published from 1937 to 1938. Like the newspaper comic-strip character Popeye (1929) and novelist Philip Wylie's protagonist Hugo Danner (1930), she is among the precursors of the archetypal comic-book superhero, Superman.

== Publication history ==
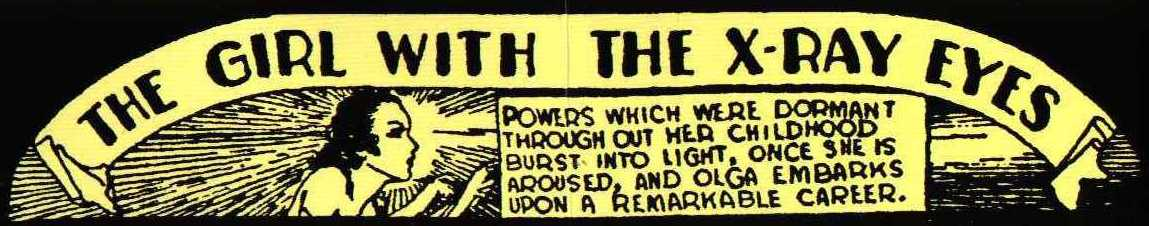
The comic strip's logo

Olga Mesmer, "The Girl with the X-ray Eyes", starred in a single-page comic strip that ran in issues of the pulp magazine Spicy Mystery Stories cover-dated August 1937 to October 1938. The first story, "The Astounding Adventures of Olga Mesmer, the Girl with the X-Ray Eyes", and subsequent installments are by an unidentified writer. Art for the strip, created at a comics studio run by Adolphe Barreaux, is credited to Watt Dell, who sometimes signed his illustrations for the magazine as Watt Dell Lovett, and may be a pseudonym; as well, some of the Mesmer strips are signed "Stone".

== Powers and abilities ==
Mesmer's X-ray vision stemmed from experiments done on her Venusian mother, Margot, by her mad-scientist father, Dr. Hugo Mesmer, who exposed Margot to radiation.

== Legacy ==
With scientifically enhanced super-strength and X-ray vision, but no separate alter ego and with her powers kept secret, she nonetheless is considered by comics historian Will Murray as "the superhero before Superman", though an addition about her mother's extraterrestrial origin may have come only after Superman's debut. More generally, writes historian Peter Coogan, she is considered a precursor:

The only clear superhero convention present is superpowers. But many science-fiction superfolk and mythical heroes before Olga had powers equal to or greater than hers, so if she is a superhero, she is not the first and the superhero genre extends back to the legend of Gilgamesh. ... There is more to superheroes than superpowers. Further, Mesmer lacks the codename and costume aspects of the identity convention. Her tale generically fits within the SF superman (or woman), genre, particularly in the way she gets her superpowers, seemingly drawing directly on Wylie's Gladiator for inspiration. ... Unlikely to have influenced [Superman creators] Siegel or Shuster, Olga Mesmer merely demonstrates the same point that the other comics precursors to Superman demonstrate: that, like the pulps before them, comic books and comic strips contained all the elements of the superhero — the powers, the mission, the identity — but it took Siegel and Shuster to put them all together into Superman.
