= Louis Forton =

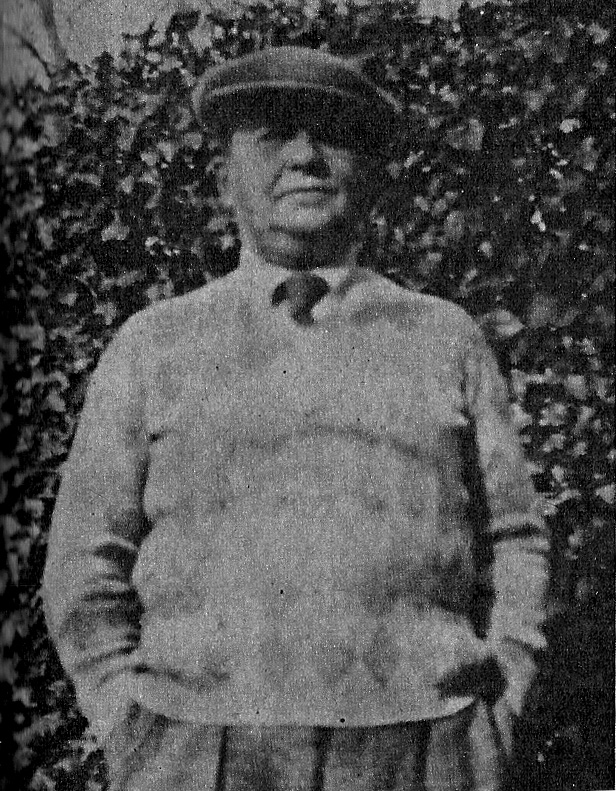
- Louis Forton

Louis Forton (March 14, 1879, in Sées, Orne – February 15, 1934, in Saint-Germain-en-Laye) was a French screenwriter and comic strip artist.

Louis Forton was one of the pioneers of French comic strips. He is notably the creator of the famous satirical and humorous series: Les Pieds nickelés, created in 1908, and Bibi Fricotin, in 1928, continued after his death by Gaston Callaud.

== Biography ==
Louis Alphonse Forton was born in Sées in the department of Orne on March 14, 1879. Before becoming a cartoonist, Louis Forton worked as a stable boy, then a groom, and finally a jockey. After meeting one of the Offenstadt Brothers in 1904, who began publishing illustrated magazines for youth, he was hired as an artist for the weekly magazine L'Illustré. He began his artistic career with the publication of L’Histoire du Sire de Ciremolle. Shortly after the demise of this magazine, he regularly contributed to Petit Illustré amusant, military journals such as La Vie en culotte rouge, La Vie de Garnison, as well as to Polichinelle and Petit Illustré Amusant.

For the launch of L’American illustré in 1907, he drew numerous stories such as Isidore Mac Aron, Anatole Fricotard, and Séraphin Laricot, under anglophone pseudonyms such as "Tom Hatt", "Tommy Jackson", or "W. Paddock". In 1908, he became the main artist for l'Épatant for which he created Les Pieds nickelés in the ninth issue dated June 4, 1908. He illustrated 1948 strips for this series. At the same time, he continued to draw for magazines such as La Vie de Garnison, as well as Mon Copain du Dimanche (1911) and Le Pêle-Mêle (1924). In 1924, he stopped Les Pieds Nickelés to create Bibi Fricotin in Le Petit Illustré. In 1925, he created Les Aventures de Ploum for l'Épatant. In 1927, he resumed the adventures of Les Pieds Nickelés which he continued until his death on February 15, 1934, in Saint-Germain-en-Laye following a surgical operation.

His son ran the bar des Mûriers ("Aux Pieds Nickelés"), Avenue Gambetta, in Paris, and his grandson Gérald Forton became a cartoonist like him.

== Publications ==
- La vocation de Bibi Fricotin (1928).
- Bibi Fricotin fait des farces (1928).
- Bibi Fricotin fait le tour du monde (1930).
- Bibi Fricotin boit l'obstacle (1931).
- Bibi triomphe (1933).
- Bibi Fricotin détective (1934).
- Bibi Fricotin roi des débrouillards (1935).
- La Bande des Pieds Nickelés.
- Les Pieds Nickelés arrivent.
- Les Pieds Nickelés au Far West.
- Les Pieds Nickelés au Mexique.
- Les Pieds Nickelés en Amérique.
- Les Pieds Nickelés ministres.
- Les Pieds Nickelés s'en vont en guerre.
- Les Pieds Nickelés voyagent.
- Les nouvelles aventures des Pieds Nickelés. La Vie est belle (1937).
- Les Pieds Nickelés ont le filon (1935).

== See also ==
=== Bibliography ===
- Patrick Gaumer (2010). "Forton, Louis". Dictionnaire mondial de la BD (in French). Paris: Larousse. p. 331. ISBN 9782035843319..
- François Membre. L'Histoire par la bande, biographie de Louis Forton. De Varly Editions.
