= Michel Vieuchange =

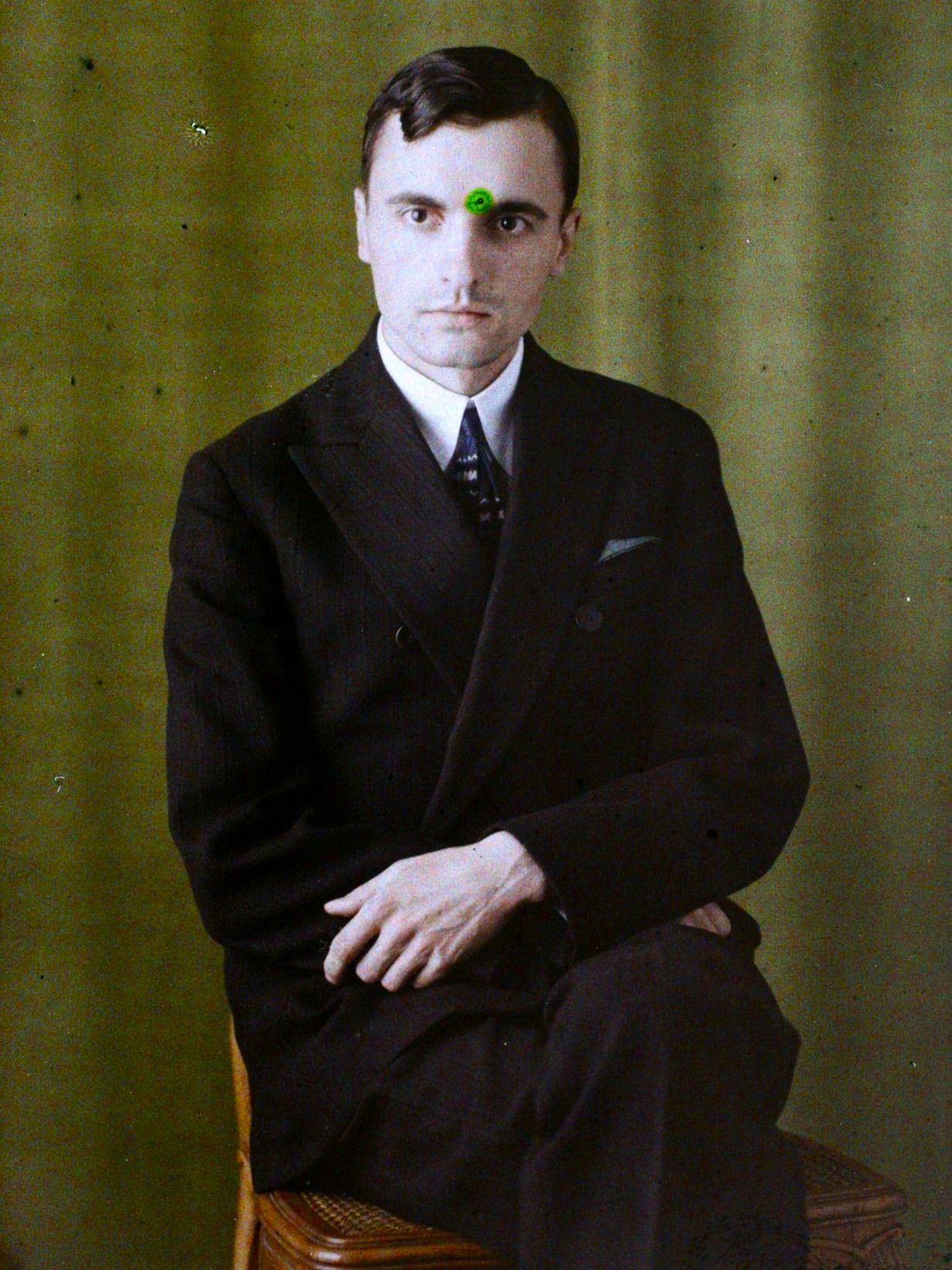
Autochrome by Georges Chevalier, 1928

Michel Vieuchange (26 August 1904, Nevers – 30 November 1930, Agadir) was a French adventurer who was the first European to visit the abandoned ruins of the walled city of Smara, in the interior of the Sahara.

On 10 September 1930, Vieuchange set off on his journey of discovery into a largely unexplored region of North Africa. He was unsure of the exact location of Smara, nor did he speak Arabic or Berber, the languages of the few nomads in the region. Through severe hardship he reached his goal and returned to civilization on 16 November at the Moroccan town of Tiznit, almost 400 kilometres (250 mi) from Smara. Vieuchange died a few days later, weakened from dysentery.

He maintained a journal of his adventure, which was published by his brother Jean Vieuchange in 1932 as Smara, chez les dissidents du Sud marocain et du Rio de Oro (English title: Smara: The Forbidden City).

In his early twenties, Vieuchange obtained a degree in literature and wrote a first (unpublished) novel Hipparète that showed his fascination for the culture and history of Ancient Greece. He was also intrigued by the new movie industry and dreamed of becoming a film director after working as an assistant for Abel Gance on Napoléon.

His expedition to Smara became an obsession to which he sacrificed everything, going so far as to have his gold tooth removed before travelling to Morocco and disguising himself as a Berber woman to reach Smara. His desire for adventure was born of the idea that a man of letters should also be "a man of action". He was highly influenced by such French writers as Antoine de Saint-Exupéry, André Gide, and Paul Claudel. The latter wrote the preface to the French version of "Smara: The Forbidden City" when first published in 1932. The English version in its later reprint was prefaced by Paul Bowles, author of the 1949 novel, The Sheltering Sky.

== Partial bibliography ==
- Vieuchange, Michel. Smara: Forbidden City. [1932] New York: W. W. Norton & Co. Reprinted edition (1988). ISBN 978-0-88001-146-4
- Vieuchange, Michel; Claudel, Paul (preface). (in French) Chez les dissidents du Sud marocain et du Rio de Oro. Paris: Plon (1932).
- Vieuchange, Michel; Claudel, Paul (preface). (in French) Smara: Carnets de route d'un fou du désert. Paris: Éditions Phébus (Revised edition: 2004). ISBN 978-2-85940-998-2
