= 1955 in comics =

Notable events of 1955 in comics.

== Publications and events ==
- As part of the fallout resulting from the Fredric Wertham's Seduction of the Innocent and the 1954 comic book hearings of the United States Senate Subcommittee on Juvenile Delinquency, publishers Avon Comics, Eastern Color Printing, Lev Gleason Publications, Master Comics, Nesbit, Orbit Publications, Reston Publications, Toby Press, Trojan Magazines, and the S. M. Iger Studio go out of business (or otherwise cease publishing comic books).

=== January ===
- January: In the 19th issue of Mad Magazine, Harvey Kurtzman and Will Elder's Mickey Rodent, a parody of Disney comics, is first printed.
- January 2: Professor Pi by Dutch comics artist Bob van den Born, which already ran in some foreign newspapers, is published in a Dutch newspaper for the first time, namely Het Parool.
- January 3: The Mickey Mouse story Mickey Mouse and Dr. X by Bill Walsh and Floyd Gottfredson is first published.
- January 6: In Spirou the Tif et Tondu story Tif et Tondu contre la Main Blanche (written by Maurice Rosy and drawn by Will) starts running, which marks the debut of recurring and iconic villain Mr. Choc.
- January 8: With the death of cartoonist Ed Payne, the long-running newspaper comic Billy the Boy Artist comes to a close after having been in production for 56 years straight.
- The final issue of Giggle Comics is published.
- Journey into Mystery (1952 series) #21 - Atlas Comics

=== February ===
- February 15: Sydney Jordan's Jeff Hawke makes its debut. It will run until 18 April 1974.
- Cancellation of Tales from the Crypt, with issue #46, by EC Comics.
- Cancellation of Two-Fisted Tales.
- Journey into Mystery (1952 series) #22 - Atlas Comics

=== March ===
- March 30: In Tintin Ric Hochet makes his debut in the story Ric Hochet Mène Le Jeu, by Andrè-Paul Duchateau and Tibet.
- March 31: The first episode of Guy Bara's gag comic Max L'Explorateur is published.
- The first issue of the American comics magazine Extra is published. Five issues will be published before its eventual cancellation in November/December.
- Stephen Slesinger's King of the Royal Mounted draws to a close.
- Stan Lee and Bob Brown's Rawhide Kid makes its debut, published by Atlas Comics.
- Carl Barks' Uncle Scrooge story, The Lemming with the Locket is first published.
- Journey into Mystery (1952 series) #23 - Atlas Comics

=== April ===
- April 1: Pieter J. Kuhn's Kapitein Rob is discontinued in Het Parool after nine and a half years of an uninterrupted run. The artist decides to quit, but a year later his series will be relaunched.
- April 4: Piet Wijn's aviation comic Frank, De Vliegende Hollander starts in Het Parool as a replacement for Kapitein Rob.
- The first issue of the American comics magazine M.D. by EC Comics is published. It will only last until December.
- First issue of the Italian magazine Miciolino.

=== May ===
- Il Segreto del Cinese (The chinaman’s secret), last adventure of Dick Fulmine (Selene).
- With issue #24, Mad converts its format from an EC Comics comic book to a magazine. In doing so, it inadvertently escapes the strictures of the Comics Code and becomes one of the great success stories of 20th-century magazine publishing.
- Western Tales of Black Rider, with issue #28, takes over the numbering of Black Rider — Atlas Comics
- The third-last issue of Teen-Age Romances is published and the series is cancelled shortly after.
- Journey into Mystery (1952 series) #24 - Atlas Comics

=== June ===
- June 5: Warren Tufts' Lance makes its debut.
- June 10: In Topolino the first chapter of The Blot's Double Mystery, by Guido Martina and Romano Scarpa is published. In this story, exceptionally crude and disquieting for the Disney's standards, the Phantom Blot returns fifteen years after his first creation.
- June 27: With Mickey Mouse and Li'l Davy by Bill Walsh and Floyd Gottfredson, the Davy Crockett miniseries is spoofed. It's also Gottfredson's final longer adventure comic, who later realizes only self-conclusive strips.
- In the 92nd issue of Batman the character Ace the Bat-Hound makes its debut.
- Carl Barks' Uncle Scrooge story The Fabulous Philosopher’s Stone is first published.

=== July ===
- July 15: The first issue of Pepito hits the market (Edizioni Alpe).
- July 30: Frank Victor Martinek's Don Winslow of the Navy comes to an end.
- July 30: Ken Reid's Grandpa makes its debut in The Beano.
- Crime Does Not Pay (1942 series) #147 cancelled by Lev Gleason Publications.
- Cancellation of Red Ryder Comics, with issue #144 by Dell Comics.
- Cancellation of Famous Funnies, with issue #218.
- In the first issue of the Italian magazine Volpetto (Editoriale Metro), Nonna Abelarda makes her debut with the story La Banda La Bott, by Giovan Battista Carpi.
- Journey into Mystery (1952 series) #25 - Atlas Comics

=== August ===
- August 26: In Spirou the Lucky Luke story Rails on the prairie by René Goscinny and Morris is first published. This marks the first time Goscinny writes a story for the series, as well as the first time Luke sings his signature song: I'm a poor lonesome cowboy in the final panel.
- August 28: In Albi d’oro, Paperino e l’uomo del west (Donald Duck and the westerner), by Guido Martina and Giovan Battista Carpi “Holes in the hands”, the prodigal brother of Uncle Scrooge makes his first and only appearance.

=== September ===
- September 1: In Spirou, the first chapter of the Spirou et Fantasio story Les pirates du silence by Andrè Franquin is serialized.
- September 25:
  - Gus Edson's Dondi makes its debut.
  - The first episode of René Goscinny and Sempé's Le Petit Nicolas is serialized, still in comic strip format. It will run in this format up until 20 May 1956. In 1959 the series returns as illustrated short stories.
- September: First publication of Manuel García Ferré's Hijitus.
- Journey into Mystery (1952 series) #26 - Atlas Comics

=== October ===
- October 16: Gene Deitch's Terr'ble Thompson makes its debut. It will run until 14 April 1956.
- October 19:
  - In Tintin Tibet and André-Paul Duchâteau's Chick Bill makes its debut with a human cast. The comic strip debuted two years earlier in Chez Nous, albeit in a talking animal version.
  - André Franquin's Modeste et Pompon makes its debut.
  - the first chapter of Atlantis Mystery, by Edgar Pierre Jacobs, is published.
- October 30: Jef Nys' Jommeke makes its debut as a gag-a-day strip in the Belgian magazine Kerk en Leven.
- October 31: Ward Greene and Dick Moores's Scamp makes its debut. It will run until 1988.
- Journey into Mystery (1952 series) #27 - Atlas Comics

=== November ===
- November 10: The first episode of Rik Clément's Ridder Reinhart appears in 't Kapoentje.
- November 15: The final episode of Phiny Dick, Coen van Hunnik and Richard Klokkers' Olle Kapoen is published.
- November 20: Malang's Chain Gang Charlie makes its debut.
- November 24: Dupuis releases the Belgian comics magazine Risque-Tout, which will appear until 1 November 1956.
- November 27: The first episode of Rik Clément's Dees Dubbel appears in Ons Zondagsblad.
- The first issue of Marvel Comics' Snafu is published, but it will only last three issues and disappear in March 1956.
- Journey into Mystery (1952 series) #28 - Atlas Comics

=== December ===
- December 23: The first issue of the long-running German comics magazine Mosaik is published.
- Gunsmoke Western, with issue #32, takes over the numbering of Western Tales of Black Rider — Atlas Comics
- Carl Barks' Uncle Scrooge story The Golden Fleece is first published.
- Journey into Mystery (1952 series) #29 - Atlas Comics

=== Specific date unknown ===
- The final episode of both Arthur Warden's Snowdrop's Zoo and Tuffy and his Magic Tail is published.
- Belvision creates some animated TV shorts for Belgian television, based on the comics series Suske en Wiske and Tijl Uilenspiegel by Willy Vandersteen, which are broadcast during the children's show Kom Toch Eens Kijken.
- The first Bungeishunjū Manga Award is handed out. It will remain an annual event until 2001.

== Births ==
=== April ===
- April 5: Akira Toriyama, Japanese manga artist (creator of Dragon Ball) (d. 2024).

=== July ===
- July 29: Dave Stevens, American comic book artist (creator of the Rocketeer), (d. 2008).

=== October ===
- October 29: Gary Leib, American cartoonist, musician and animator (Idiotland) (d. 2021).

=== December ===
- December 27: Miguel Gallardo, Spanish comic book author (El Víbora), (d. 2022).

== Deaths ==
=== January ===
- January 7: Ed Payne, American comics artist (Billy the Boy Artist, Professor O. Howe Wise and Professor I.B. Schmart), dies at age 84.
- January 18: George Morrow, British cartoonist, illustrator and comics artist (published in Punch), dies at age 85.

=== February ===
- February 21: William de la Torre, Mexican comics artist (Pedrito), dies at age 39.

=== March ===
- March 22: Kristoffer Aamot, Norwegian journalist, film director, politician and comics writer (Skomakker Bekk of Tvillingene Hans), dies at age 65.
- Specific date unknown: Ellison Hoover, American cartoonist and comics artist (Mr. and Mrs.), dies at age 66 or 67.

=== April ===
- April 12: Louis Maîtrejean, French illustrator and comics artist (Linette et son Poilu), dies at age 73.
- April 21: Knut Stangenberg, Swedish comics artist (Fridolf Celinder), dies at age 83.

=== August ===
- August 5: André Vlaanderen, Dutch comics artist (advertising comic books for the Gazelle bicycle factory), dies at age 73.
- August 25: Kitazawa Rakuten, Japanese manga artist (Tagosaku and Mokube's Sightseeing in Tokyo, The Failures of Kidoro Haikara, Chame and Dekobo, Nukesaku Teino, Tonda Haneko Jo, founder of the magazines Tokyo Puck and Rakuten Puck), dies at age 82.

=== September ===
- September 15: Al Wenzel, American comics artist (Roscoe Sweeney, assisted on The Spirit, Steve Roper and Mike Nomad and Buz Sawyer), dies at age 31.
- September 23: Katharine P. Rice, American illustrator and comics artist (Flora Flirt), dies at age 76.

=== October ===
- October 6: Jean Doisy, Belgian journalist and publisher (chief editor of Spirou, 1938-1955), dies at age 55 from throat cancer.
- Specific date unknown: Jon L. Blummer, aka Jon Elby, aka Don Shelby, American illustrator and comics artist (Hop Harrigan, Fighting Yank, Ultra-Man, Captain X of the RAF, Little Boy Blue, The Sea Hound, Adventures Into the Unknown, Forbidden Worlds, comics based on The Lone Ranger), dies at age 51.

=== November ===
- November 2: Carl Storch, Austrian-Hungarian illustrator and comics artist (Maus und Molli, Puck und Muck), dies at age 87.
- November 12: Otto Nückel, German painter, graphic designer, illustrator and comics artist (Schicksal (Destiny)), dies at age 67.
- November 30: Foxo Reardon, American cartoonist and comics artist (Bozo), dies at age 50 from cancer.

=== December ===
- December 16: Ami Hauhio, Finnish comics artist (Koltan Perintö, Maan mies Marsissa), dies at age 43.
- December 20: Emilio Cortinas, Uruguayan comics artist (Vito Nervio, Homero, El Muchacho Viajero), dies at age 39 from cancer.
- December 27: Alex Gurney, Australian comics artist (Ben Bowyang), dies at age 53.
- December 27: Ham Fisher, American comics artist (Joe Palooka), commits suicide at age 55.

=== Specific date unknown ===
- Erich F.T. Schenk, German-American painter, children's book illustrator, animator and comics artist (Sleeping' Lena, Silas Skinflint, Blowaway), dies at age 53 or 54.

== First issue by title ==
=== Marvel Comics ===
- The Adventures of Pinky Lee
- Billy Buckskin Western
- The Black Knight
- Della Vision
- Homer the Happy Ghost
- Marines in Action
- Meet Miss Bliss
- My Girl Pearl
- Navy Combat
- Rawhide Kid
- Strange Tales of the Unusual
- Wyatt Earp

=== Other publishers ===
- The Brave and the Bold (DC Comics, Aug./Sept.)
- Black Fury (Charlton Comics, May)
- Little Lotta (Harvey Comics, Nov.)
- Psychoanalysis (EC Comics, Mar.)
- Ribon (Shueisha, Aug.)
- Zenith gigante (Edizioni Audace) : reprints of Western adventures already appeared in strip format.
- Miciolino (April) and Volpetto (Bianconi editore, July): Italian magazines for the younger ones.
- Pepito (15 July), edizioni Alpe..

== Renamed titles ==
- Cowboy Action #5 renamed from Western Thrillers
- Gunsmoke Western #32 renamed from Western Tales of Black Rider - Marvel Comics
- Jann of the Jungle #8 renamed from Jungle Tales - Marvel Comics
- Patty Powers #4 renamed from Della Vision - Marvel Comics
- Police Badge issue 749 #5 renamed from Spy Thrillers - Marvel Comics
- Strange Stories of Suspense #5 renamed from Rugged Action - Marvel Comics
- Western Tales of Black Rider #28 renamed from Black Rider - Atlas Comics

== Initial appearance by character name ==
=== Atlas Comics ===
- Black Knight (Sir Percy), in Black Knight #1 (May)
- Homer the Happy Ghost, in Homer, The Happy Ghost #1 (Mar.)
- Morgan le Fay, in Black Knight #1 (May)
- Mordred, in Black Knight #1 (May)
- Rawhide Kid, in Rawhide Kid #1 (Mar.)

=== DC Comics ===
- Ace the Bat-Hound, in Batman #92 (July)
- Krypto in Adventure Comics #210 (March), created by Otto Binder and Curt Swan - DC Comics
- Martian Manhunter in Detective Comics #225 (November), created by Joseph Samachson and Joseph Certa - DC Comics
- Silent Knight in The Brave and the Bold #1 (August), created by Robert Kanigher and Irv Novick - DC Comics
- Viking Prince in The Brave and the Bold #1 (August), created by Robert Kanigher and Joe Kubert - DC Comics

=== Other publishers ===
- Kid Marvelman, in Marvelman #102 (L. Miller & Son, July)
- Pon Pon, by Luciano Bottaro, in Lo scolaro (with the name of Sir funghetto); animated mushroom.
- Nonna Abelarda, by Giovan Battista Carpi, in Volpetto (editoriale Bianconi, July); sprightly old woman with Herculean strength.
