= 1959 in comics =

Notable events of 1959 in comics.

== Publications and events ==
=== January ===
- January 7: In Tintin, the first chapter of the Michel Vaillant story Le Pilote Sans Visage by Jean Graton, is published.
- January 11:
  - After two years of publication Charles M. Schulz' It's Only a Game comes to an end.
  - The first episode of Jean Tabary's Totoche is printed in the magazine Vaillant.
- January 25: Jean Tabary's Grabadu et Gabaliouchtou makes its debut.
- January 31: Philip Mendoza's The Adventures of Katie Country Mouse debuts. It will run until 1964.
- Mr. District Attorney, with issue #67 (January/February cover date), is cancelled by DC Comics.
- In the Italian Disney magazine Topolino, the story Paperiade (The Ducks’ Iliad), based on a script by Guido Martina and drawings by Luciano Bottaro, is first published. That same year, Martina carries out Disney versions of other classics (Der ring des Nibelungen, Cantar de mio Cid, The Adventures of Saturnin Farandoul).

=== March ===
- March 10: In the Italian magazine Topolino the story Mickey Mouse in the Delta Dimension, by Romano Scarpa is prepublished, which marks the debut of Atomo Bleep-Bleep and the return of Doctor Einmug, who hadn't been featured in 20 years.
- March 15: After 38 years of publication Russ Westover's Tillie the Toiler is discontinued.
- March 27: In Charles M. Schulz' Peanuts Lucy van Pelt opens up her psychiatric booth.
- March 28: The final episode of Phiny Dick, Ton Beek, Eiso Toonder and Andries Brandt's Birre Beer is published.
- March: Flash Comics, a series which ended in 1949 is rebooted and marks the debut of The Flash by John Broome and Carmine Infantino.
- Carl Barks' Uncle Scrooge story The Flying Dutchman is first published.
- In Italy, Renzo Barbieri debuts as writer and editor with the western series Timbergek.

=== April ===
- April 16: in Spirou, first chapter of Z comme Zorglub, by Greg and Franquin.

=== May ===
- May 20: The final episode of René Goscinny and Sempé's Le Petit Nicolas is serialized, still in comic strip format. In 1959 the series returns as illustrated short stories.
- May 24: After two and a half years Frank Giacoia's Johnny Reb and Billy Yank comes to an end.
- May 26: In Charles M. Schulz' Peanuts Sally Brown makes her debut.
- May 30: John Dixon's Air Hawk and the Flying Doctors makes its debut.
- Hopalong Cassidy, with issue #135 (May/June cover date), cancelled by DC.
- Carl Barks's Donald Duck story The Beachcombers' Picnic is published in Walt Disney’s comics and stories.

=== June ===
- June 6: Leo Baxendale's The Three Bears makes its debut in The Beano.
- June 21: The first issue of the Belgian children's magazine Zonnekind, a sister publication of Zonneland, is published. In the first issue Nonkel Fons and Gray Croucher's Rikske en Fikske makes its debut.

=== July ===
- July 2: In Spirou the first chapter of Les Schtroumpfs noirs by Peyo is prepublished, which is the first long narrative starring the Smurfs after they debuted as side characters in Johan and Peewit a year earlier.
- July 30: In Spirou the first chapter of the Lucky Luke story En remontant le Mississippi, script by Goscinny, drawn by Morris is prepublished.

=== August ===
- August 10: In the Italian magazine Topolino, the first episode of Paperino e l’isola del Tesoro (Donald and the Treasure Island) by Luciano Bottaro, inaugurating the cycle of the "pirate ducks" narratives, and The man from Oola-Oola, by Romano Scarpa, are published.
- August 19: In Tintin magazine, The Michel Vaillant story Le circuit de la peur (The fear's circuit) by Jean Graton is first published.
- In the Argentina magazine Supetotem, Hugo Pratt debuts as complete author (writer and illustrator) with the first episode of Ana y Dan, an adventure series set in the colonial Africa.

=== September ===
- September 14: The new The Adventures of Nero story De Zoon van Nero starts in Het Volk, which marks the birth of Nero's son Adhemar.
- September 24:The final issue of the Belgian Disney comics magazine Mickey Magazine is published.
- September: Harvey Kurtzman's graphic novel Harvey Kurtzman's Jungle Book is first published.
- La griffe noire by Jacques Martin (Le Lombard), fifth album of the series Alix, prepublished as a serial in Tintin.

=== October ===
- October 6: In Charles M. Schulz' Peanuts Linus van Pelt first expresses his love for Miss Othmar.
- October 10: After 27 years of publication Norman Pett's Jane comes to an end.
- October 17: After 23 years of continuous publication Bill Connor and Steve Dowling's Belinda comes to an end.
- October 17: The British comics magazine The Comet ceases to exist and merges into the new magazine Tiger.
- October 17: After 42 years of publication Sidney Smith's The Gumps comes to an end.
- October 19: Dennis Collins' The Perishers makes its debut.
- October 24: The British boys' story paper The Hotspur is transformed into a comics magazine: The New Hotspur. It will run until 24 January 1981.
- October 26: In Charles M. Schulz' Peanuts Linus van Pelt first talks about the Great Pumpkin.
- October 29: The first issue of the French comics magazine Pilote is published, which will become one of the best-selling magazines ever in only a few years. In its first issue Astérix by René Goscinny and Albert Uderzo (introducing Asterix, Obelix, Getafix the druid, Vitalstatistix the chieftain and Cacofonix the bard), Tanguy et Laverdure by Jean-Michel Charlier and Albert Uderzo and Jean-Michel Charlier and Victor Hubinon's Redbeard make their debut.
- Specific date in October unknown: The first episode of André LeBlanc's Our Bible in Pictures is published. The series will run until 1964 and become a global bestseller.

=== November ===
- November 5: Willy Vandersteen's De Rode Ridder, based on the novels by Leopold Vermeiren, makes its debut.
- November 10: In the Italian magazine Topolino The Sacred Spring of Seasons, by Romano Scarpa is prepublished.

=== December ===
- December 10: In the 1130th issue of the Belgian magazine Spirou a small supplement Smurfs comic book is added named Le Voleur de Schtroumpfs, in which Gargamel and Azrael make their debut.
- December 16: Raymond Macherot's Clifton makes its debut.
- December 24: Jean Roba and Maurice Rosy's Boule et Bill makes its debut in Spirou.
- Carl Barks' Donald Duck story The Wax Museum is prepublished in Walt Disney's Comics and Stories.

=== Specific date unknown ===
- Dick Millington's Mighty Moth makes its debut in TV Comic, where it will run until 1984.
- In the newspaper Folha da Manha Mauricio de Sousa's comic strip Dudu makes its debut, which later, under the name Monica’s gang, will become the most popular Brazilian comic.
- In Le parisien liberè, Tembo Tabou, by Greg, Andrè Franquin and Jean Roba, is prepublished.

== Births ==
=== January ===
- January 7: Karl Kesel, American comic book writer and artist (Superman, Hawk and Dove, Fantastic Four).

=== March ===
- March 14: Michelangelo La Neve, Italian comics writer (Dylan Dog, Martin Mystère), (d. 2022).

=== April ===
- April 11: Oscar González Loyo, Mexican animator and comics artist (Karmatrón y Los Transformables), (d. 2021).

=== May ===
- May 4: Henriette Valium, Canadian painter and comics artist, (d. 2021).

=== June ===
- June 27: Dan Jurgens, American comic book artist and writer (Superman, Booster Gold, Batman Beyond, Thor).

=== July ===
- July 10: Marc Daniëls, Belgian comics writer and artist (Stam & Pilou, various celebrity comics) and co-founder of Studio Max!, (d. 2021).

=== September ===
- September 17: Frank Cummings, Venezuelan-American comics artist (Brain Squirts, assisted on Blondie, published in Cracked), (d. 2014).

=== November ===
- November 19: Steve Lightle, American comics artist (Doom Patrol, continued Legion of Super-Heroes), (d. 2021).

== Deaths ==
=== January ===
- January 30: Hans Füsser, German caricaturist and comics artist (Jackel und Bastel), dies at age 60.

=== March ===
- March 12: F. Verdugo, Spanish journalist and comics artist, dies at age 84.

=== April ===
- April 14: Marcel Antoine, French caricaturist, radio presenter, comedian, singer and comic artist (Slache), dies at age 62.
- April 15: Harry B. Martin, American comics artist (Weatherbird, It Happened in Birdland), dies from cerebral thrombosis at age 85.

=== May ===
- May 1: Reginald Arkell, British novelist, playwright and comics writer (scripted Bosch the Soldier by Alfred Leete), dies at age 76.

=== July ===
- July 2: R. F. Schabelitz, American illustrator and comics artist, dies at age 72.
- July 6: George Grosz, German painter, caricaturist, and illustrator, dies at age 65.
- July 31: Nikolai Kogout, Russian painter, illustrator and poster designer (some of his posters make use of sequential narratives), dies at age 67.

=== August ===
- August 4: Eric Ericson, American comics artist and cartoonist (The Grounded Gremlin, Herkimer Fuddle), dies at age 45.
- August 5: Frank Godwin, American comics artist and illustrator (Connie, Rusty Riley, continued Roy Powers, Eagle Scout), dies at age 69 from a heart attack.
- August 11: Matt Baker, American comics artist (Phantom Lady, Flamingo) dies at age 37.
- August 11: Bert Wymer, British comics artist and archeologist (continued Tiger Tim), dies at age 68.

=== September ===
- September 1: Joseph Wirt Tillotson, American illustrator and comic artist, (Our Bible in Pictures), dies at age 54.
- September 10: René Kulbach, Canadian comic artist (Tang, Out of the Woods), dies at age 51.
- September 28: Gerard Hoffnung, German-British cartoonist and musician, dies at age 34 from a cerebral haemorrhage.
- September 29: Bruce Bairnsfather, British comics artist and cartoonist (Old Bill), dies at age 72 from bladder cancer.

=== October ===
- October 10: Carl Ed, American comics artist (Harold Teen), dies at age 69.

=== November ===
- November 21: Hal Forrest, American comics artist (Artie the Ace, Tailspin Tommy), dies at age 64.

=== December ===
- December 7: Peter Beekman, Dutch comics artist (Hansje, Ansje en de Meeuw, Rare, Maar Ware Commentaren), dies at age 48.
- December 9: Gene Carr, American comics artist (Lady Bountiful, The Bad Dream That Made Bill A Better Boy), dies at age 78.
- December 14: Ingrid Vang Nyman, Danish illustrator and comic artist (comics based on Pippi Longstocking), commits suicide at age 43.

=== Specific date unknown ===
- Wasdale Brown, British illustrator comics artist (drew the off-model replacement comic for Rupert Bear in 1933), dies at age 56 or 57.
- Will Donald, Australian comics artist (Fashion Plate Fanny), dies at age 85 or 86.
- Norman Yendell Ward, British comic artist (comics for Film Fun magazine), dies at age 53.

== First issues by title ==
- Kathy - Marvel Comics
- A Date with Millie - Marvel Comics
- Pilote magazine, featuring debuts of the series Astérix by René Goscinny and Albert Uderzo, and Michel Tanguy by Uderzo and Jean-Michel Charlier. (October 29)
- Giubba rossa – Edizioni Araldo (June); Italian version of the English series dedicated to the RCMP sergeant Dick Daring.
- Tales of Suspense - Marvel Comics
- Tales to Astonish - Marvel Comics

== Initial appearance by character name ==
- Pugacioff (May) in Cucciolo, created by Giorgio Rebuffi.
- Whisky & Gogo in Cucciolo, created by Luciano Bottaro.
- Asterix and Obélix make their debut on 29 October 1959 in the first issue of Pilote.
- Tanguy et Laverdure make their debut in the first issue of Pilote.

=== DC Comics ===
- Abin Sur in Showcase #22 (October) created by John Broome and Gil Kane - DC Comics
- Bat-Mite in Detective Comics #267 (May), created by Bill Finger and Sheldon Moldoff - DC Comics
- Carol Ferris in Showcase #22 (September), created by John Broome and Gil Kane - DC Comics
- Circe in Showcase #21 (July), created by Jack Miller and Mike Sekowsky - DC Comics
- Congorilla in Action Comics #248 (January) created by Robert Bernstein and Howard Sherman - DC Comics
- Gorilla Grodd in The Flash #106 (May), created by John Broome and Carmine Infantino - DC Comics
- Hal Jordan in Showcase #22 (October) created by John Broome and Gil Kane - DC Comics
- Human Flame in Detective Comics #274 (December), created by Jack Miller and Joe Certa - DC Comics
- Karin Grace in The Brave and the Bold #25 (September), created by Robert Kanigher and Ross Andru - DC Comics
- Lady Blackhawk in Blackhawk #133(February), created by Jack Schiff and Dick Dillin - DC Comics
- Lori Lemaris in Superman #129 (May), created by Bill Finger and Wayne Boring - DC Comics
- Lucy Lane in Superman's Pal, Jimmy Olsen #36 (April), created by Otto Binder and Curt Swan - DC Comics
- Metallo in Action Comics #252 (May), created by Robert Bernstein and Al Plastino - DC Comics
- Mirror Master in The Flash #105 (March), created by John Broome and Carmine Infantino - DC Comics
- Mister Freeze in Batman #121(February), created by Dave Wood and Sheldon Moldoff - DC Comics
- Pied Piper in The Flash #106 (May), created by John Broome and Carmine Infantino - DC Comics
- Rick Flag in The Brave and the Bold #25 (August), created by Robert Kanigher and Ross Andru - DC Comics
- Rip Hunter in Showcase #20 (June), created by Jack Miller and Ruben Moreira - DC Comics
- Sgt. Rock in Our Army at War #81 (April), created by Robert Kanigher and Joe Kubert
- Solovar in The Flash #106 (April), created by John Broome and Carmine Infantino - DC Comics
- Suicide Squad in Brave and Bold #25, created by Robert Kanigher and Ross Andru - DC Comics
- Supergirl in Action Comics #252 (May), created by Otto Binder and Al Plastino - DC Comics
- The Clock in Detective Comics #265 (March), created by Bill Finger and Sheldon Moldoff - DC Comics
- Weather Wizard, in Flash #110 (December 1959/January 1960)
