= 1952 in comics =

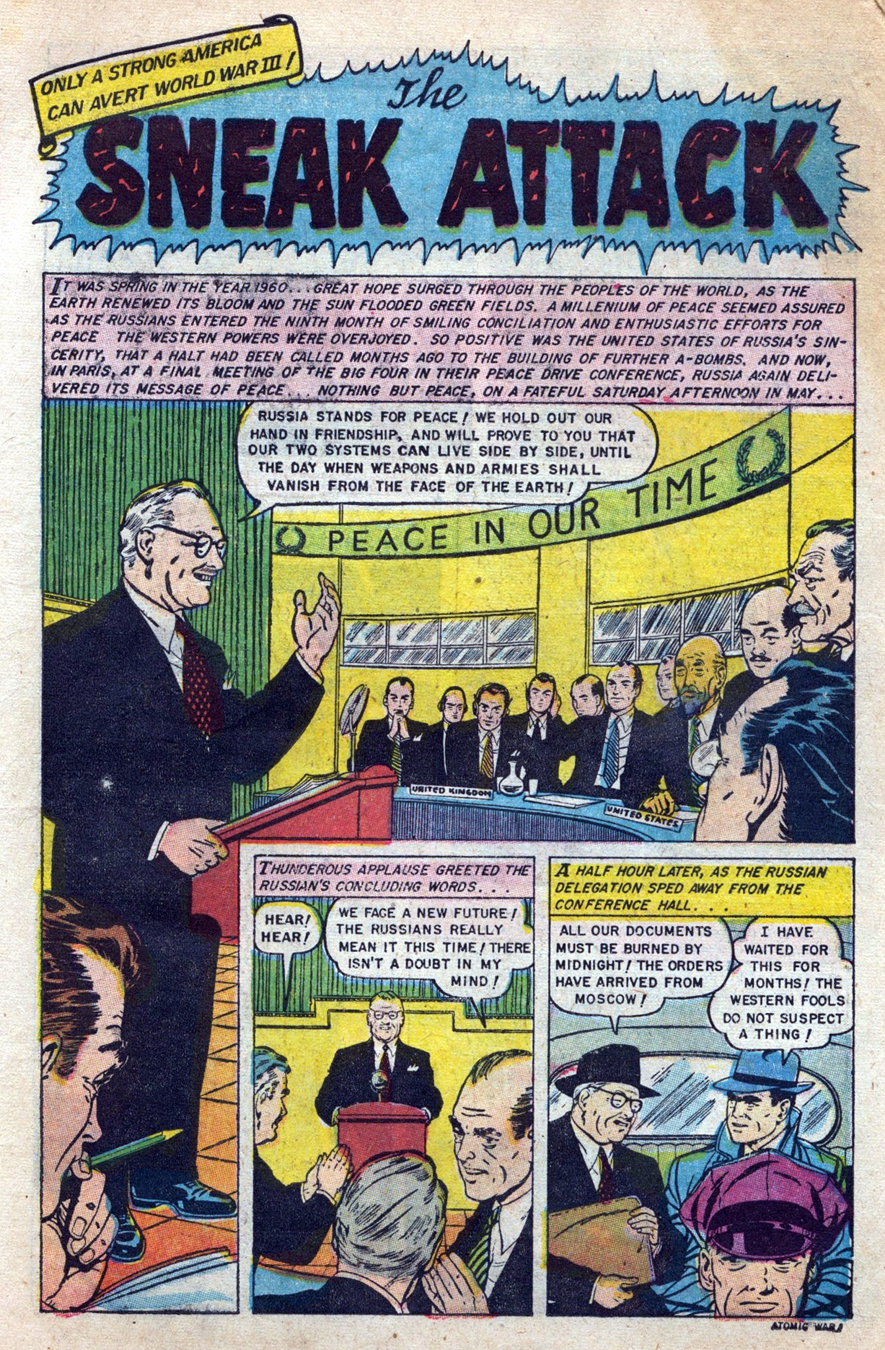
Comic page of Atomic War! #1, Page 3, November 1952

Notable events of 1952 in comics.

== Events and publications ==
=== January ===
- January 1: The first issue of Cucciolo (Edizioni Alpe) is published. In the 1950s and the 1960s, it will be the most popular Italian magazine for children after Topolino.
- January 3: Hussein Amin Bikar establishes the Egyptian children's comics magazine Sindibad (also known as Sinbad).
- January 5: Belgian curator Frans Verstreken organizes the first annual Flemish cartoon exhibition Salon van de Vlaamse Humor (Salon of Flemish Comedy), exhibiting cartoons by dozens of Flemish cartoonists and comic artists.
- January 6: Charles M. Schulz' Peanuts receives its first Sunday comics page.
- January 10: André Franquin's Starter makes its debut.
- January 23: The first episode of the Mickey Mouse story The Midas ring is published, by Floyd Gottfredson and Bill Walsh.
- January 31: In Spirou et les Héritiers by André Franquin the Marsupilami makes his debut.
- Astonishing (1951 series) #8 - Atlas Comics
- Phantom Stranger (January/February) #1
- Rex the Wonder Dog (January/February) #1
- In Walt Disney's Comics and Stories, Gladstone's Usual Very Good Year, by Carl Barks; first apparition of the Junior Woodchucks’ seat.
- In Four Color, A Christmas for Shacktown, always by Carl Barks.

=== February ===
- February 2: Crockett Johnson's Barnaby comes to an end.
- February 23:
  - The first issue of the British comics magazine Lion is published. It will last until 18 May 1974.
  - In the first issue of Lion, E. George Cowan and Alan Philpott's long-running comic series Robot Archie makes its debut.
- Astonishing (1951 series) #9 - Atlas Comics
- Men Adventures (1949 series) #12 - Atlas Comics
- Patsy and Hedy (1952 series) #1 - Atlas Comics
- Shock SuspenStories (1952 series) #1 - EC Comics
- Strange Tales (1951 series) #5 - Atlas Comics
- The Thing! (1952 series) #1 - Charlton Comics
- Young Men on the Battlefield (1949 series) #13 - Atlas Comics
- In Walt Disney's Comics and Stories, The screaming cowboy, by Carl Barks.

=== March ===
- March: In Carl Barks' Donald Duck story Statuesque Spendthrifts Duckburg's founder Cornelius Coot makes his debut.
- First issue of Uncle Scrooge; it contains Only a poor old man, one of the Carl Barks’ masterpieces.
- March 3: In Charles M. Schulz' Peanuts Lucy van Pelt makes her debut.
- March 19: The first issue of the Italian western series El Bravo (Torelli) is published, by Gian Giacomo Dalmasso and Franco Bignotti.
- March 31: In Al Capp's Li'l Abner Abner and Daisy Mae marry, a feat that even becomes a cover story in Time.
- Astonishing (1951 series) #10 - Atlas Comics
- Astonishing (1951 series) #11 - Atlas Comics
- Young Men on the Battlefield (1949 series) #14 - Atlas Comics

=== April ===
- April 8: The Piet Pienter en Bert Bibber story De Stalen Zeemeermin starts running in Het Handelsblad. Halfway the story, the new main cast member Susan makes her debut.
- April 21: The first episode of the Mickey Mouse story The Isle of Moola-la by Bill Walsh and Floyd Gottfredson is published.
- April 25: In Charles M. Schulz' Peanuts Charlie Brown tries to fly a kite, but fails. This will become a running gag in the series.
- Astonishing (1951 series) #12 - Atlas Comics
- Battlefield (1952 series) #1 - Atlas Comics
- Men Adventures (1949 series) #13 - Atlas Comics
- Strange Tales (1951 series) #6 - Atlas Comics

=== May ===
- May 1: In Carl Barks' Uncle Scrooge story Gladstone's Terrible Secret inventor Gyro Gearloose makes his debut.
- May 7: Yaakov Ashman and Elisheva Nadal-Landau publish the first episode of their comic series Lulu.
- May 27: In Charles M. Schulz' Peanuts Snoopy starts expressing himself in thought balloons, the first phase of his gradual anthropomorphism.
- Astonishing (1951 series) #13 - Atlas Comics
- Sensation Comics #109 (cover date May–June) cancelled by DC Comics
- First issue of Little Eva (St. Johns Publishing )
- In Superman 76, The Mightiest Team in the World, by Edmond Hamilton and Curt Swan. First team-up between Superman and Batman; the two heroes discover their secret identities for each other.

=== June ===
- June 10: In the Italian Disney magazine Topolino, the Mickey Mouse story Topolino nella valle dell’incanto (Mickey Mouse in the Enchanted Valley) by Guido Martina and Rino Anzi is published. In the same issue the first Uncle Scrooge Disney comic by Italian authors is printed.
- Astonishing (1951 series) #14 - Atlas Comics
- Battlefield (1952 series) #2 - Atlas Comics
- Journey into Mystery (1952 series) #1 - Atlas Comics
- Men Adventures (1949 series) #14 - Atlas Comics
- Strange Suspense Stories (1952 series) #1 - Fawcett Comics
- Strange Tales (1951 series) #7 - Atlas Comics
- Young Men on the Battlefield (1949 series) #15 - Atlas Comics
- In Walt Disney’s comics and stories, the Donald Duck story The Think Box Bollix by Carl Barks is published.

=== July ===
- July 14: In Charles M. Schulz' Peanuts Linus van Pelt makes his debut, though he only appears on screen on 19 September.
- Astonishing (1951 series) #15 - Atlas Comics
- Space Adventures (1952 series) #1 - Charlton Comics
- Strange Tales (1951 series) #8 - Atlas Comics
- In Four color, The golden helmet, by Carl Barks.

=== August ===
- August 8: Roberto Renzi and Giorgio Rebuffi's Tiramolla makes its debut.
- Astonishing (1951 series) #16 - Atlas Comics
- Battlefield (1952 series) #3 - Atlas Comics
- Journey into Mystery (1952 series) #2 - Atlas Comics
- Men Adventures (1949 series) #15 - Atlas Comics
- Our Army at War (1952 series) #1 - DC Comics
- Strange Tales (1951 series) #9 - Atlas Comics
- Young Men on the Battlefield (1949 series) #16 - Atlas Comics

=== September ===
- September 11: Peyo's medieval comic strip series Johan, initially published in other magazines since 1947, makes its debut in a redesigned version in Spirou. The initially blond-haired Johan becomes dark-haired.
- September 19: In Charles M. Schulz' Peanuts Linus van Pelt is first seen by readers, after being mentioned two months earlier.
- Astonishing (1951 series) #17 - Atlas Comics
- Strange Tales (1951 series) #10 - Atlas Comics

=== October ===
- October/November: The first issue of Mad is published by Harvey Kurtzman and William M. Gaines.
- October 3: The first episode of the Mickey Mouse story Mickey Mouse and Hoosat from another planet is published, by Bill Walsh and Floyd Gottfredson.
- October 5: The final episode of Will Eisner's The Spirit appears in papers.
- October 19: In Charles M. Schulz' Peanuts Snoopy starts dancing on his hind legs. This will become a running gag in the series.
- October 25: The first issue of the Dutch Disney comics weekly Donald Duck is published.
- Astonishing (1951 series) #18 - Atlas Comics
- Battlefield (1952 series) #4 - Atlas Comics
- G.I. Combat (1952 series) #1 - DC Comics
- Journey into Mystery (1952 series) #3 - Atlas Comics
- Men Adventures (1949 series) #16 - Atlas Comics
- Strange Tales (1951 series) #11 - Atlas Comics
- Young Men on the Battlefield (1949 series) #17 - Atlas Comics

=== November ===
- November 7: In Charles M. Schulz' Peanuts Lucy van Pelt first calls herself a "fussbudget" and changes from a nice girl into a mean one. This will become a running gag in the series.
- November 16:
  - In Charles M. Schulz' Peanuts Charlie Brown tries to kick a football, but fails. This will become a running gag in the series.
  - Marc Sleen's Oktaaf Keunink makes its debut. It will run until 4 April 1965.
- November 24: Nicholas P. Dallis and Dan Heilman's Judge Parker makes its debut.
- November 26: Willy Vandersteen's Suske en Wiske story De Dolle Musketiers is first published in the newspapers. Halfway the story, which by then already 1953, Jerom makes his debut.
- The first issue of the American Disney comics monthly Donald Duck is published. It contains Trick or Treat, by Carl Barks, based on the animated short of the same name, with the debut in comics of Witch Hazel.
- Astonishing (1951 series) #19 - Atlas Comics
- Battlefield (1952 series) #5 - Atlas Comics
- Star Spangled War Stories (1952 series) #1 - DC Comics
- Strange Tales (1951 series) #12 - Atlas Comics

=== December ===
- December: The second issue of Mad Magazine is released. Inside, Harvey Kurtzman and Will Elder's humor comic Mole! is first printed.
- December 4: In Spirou, the first chapter of the Spirou and Fantasio story La Turbotraction by André Franquin is published.
- December 11: In Spirou, the first chapter of the Lucky Luke story L'élixir du Dr. Doxey by Morris is published.
- December 24: Willy Vandersteen's western series Bessy makes its debut in La Libre Belgique.
- December 31: Giorgio Rebuffi's Trottolino makes its debut. It will run until August 1990. It is the first of the several magazines published by the Italian editor Renato Bianconi, aimed at the youngest readers.
- Astonishing (1951 series) #20 - Atlas Comics
- Battlefield (1952 series) #6 - Atlas Comics
- Journey into Mystery (1952 series) #4 - Atlas Comics
- Men Adventures (1949 series) #17 - Atlas Comics
- Strange Tales (1951 series) #13 - Atlas Comics
- Young Men on the Battlefield (1949 series) #18 - Atlas Comics
- In Walt Disney’s Comics and Stories, the Donald Duck story A Charitable Chore by Carl Barks is published.

=== Specific date unknown ===
- Marion Hull Hammel takes over the comics series Goofus and Gallant and changes the protagonists from elves into real children.
- Arthur Horner launches Colonel Pewter.
- Taizo Yokoyama creates Pu-San.

== Births ==
=== April ===
- April 6: Walli, Belgian children's book illustrator and comic artist (Kommerkat, Cosmic Connection, Gil Sinclair, continued Modeste et Pompon and Chlorophylle), (d. 2021).

=== May ===
- May 30: Mike W. Barr, American comic book writer (Batman, House of Mystery, Star Trek).
- May 31: David Anthony Kraft, American comics writer (Marvel Comics), critic (David Anthony Kraft's Comics Interview, Comics Revue) and publisher, (d. 2021).

=== September ===
- September 10: Gerry Conway, American comic book writer (DC Comics, Marvel Comics).

=== November ===
- November 26: Dan Green, American comic artist (worked for Marvel Comics, DC Comics), (d. 2023).
- November 30: Keith Giffen, American comic book writer and artist (Legion of Super-Heroes, Justice League, co-creator of Rocket Raccoon and Lobo), (d. 2023).

== Deaths ==
=== January ===
- January 22: Akos Garay, Hungarian caricaturist, painter, illustrator and comics artist, dies at age 85.

=== March ===
- March 16: Wilhelm Schulz, German painter, caricaturist, illustrator and comic artist, dies at age 86.
- March 25: Egon von Tresckow, aka Tres, German animator, illustrator, comics artist and caricaturist, dies at age 45.
- March 27: Georgi Atanasov, Bulgarian illustrator and comics artist ('Svatbata na Miki Maus), dies at age 48.

=== May ===
- May 9: Chick Gordon, British comics artist (Spadger Isle, Bamboo Town), dies at age 67 or 68.

=== July ===
- July 1: Jimmy Bancks, Australian comics artist (Ginger Meggs), dies at age 63 from a heart attack.
- July 9: Kemp Starrett, American comics artist (Vignettes of Life, Roy Powers, Eagle Scout), dies at age 62.

=== August ===
- August 25: Ola Fogelberg, Finnish comics artist (Janne Ankkanen, Pekka Puupää), dies at age 58.

=== September ===
- September 13: George Brenner, American comics artist (The Clock, Bozo the Iron Man, and 711), dies at age 38.
- September 22: H. T. Webster, American comics artist (The Timid Soul, aka Caspar Milquetoast), dies at age 67.

=== October ===
- October 11: Jean Dupuis, Belgian comics publisher (Dupuis), dies at age 76.

=== November ===
- November 26: Edward Ambrose Dyson, Australian cartoonist, illustrator and comics artist (The Capricornia's Crew and their Adventures, Crossdraw Kid, The Lost Tribe), dies at age 43.

=== December ===
- Specific date in December unknown: Harold A. McGill, Canadian comics artist (The Hall Room Boys, later retitled Percy and Ferdy), dies at age 75 or 76.

=== Specific date unknown ===
- Ofélia Marques, Portuguese comics artist, dies at age 49 or 50.

== Initial appearances by character name ==
=== DC Comics ===
- Detective Chimp in The Adventures of Rex the Wonder Dog #4 (July), created by John Broome and Carmine Infantino - DC Comics
- Firefly, in Detective Comics #184 (June), created by France Herron and Dick Sprang - DC Comics
- Phantom Stranger in Phantom Stranger #1 (August), created by John Broome, Carmine Infantino and Sy Barry - DC Comics
- Rex the Wonder Dog in The Adventures of Rex the Wonder Dog #1 (January), created by Robert Kanigher and Alex Toth - DC Comics

=== Other publishers ===
- Gyro Gearloose, in "Gladstone's Terrible Secret," Walt Disney's Comics and Stories #140 (Dell Comics, May)
- Robot Archie, in Lion #1 (Fleetway, 23 February)
- Thun'da, in Thun'da #1 (Magazine Enterprises)
- Badlo by Luciano Bottaro (Edizioni Alpe)
- Uncle Scrooge, in Four Color Comics #386 (Dell Comics)

=== Newspaper strips ===
- Linus van Pelt, in Peanuts (September 19)
- Lucy van Pelt, in Peanuts (March 3)
