= 2014 in comics =

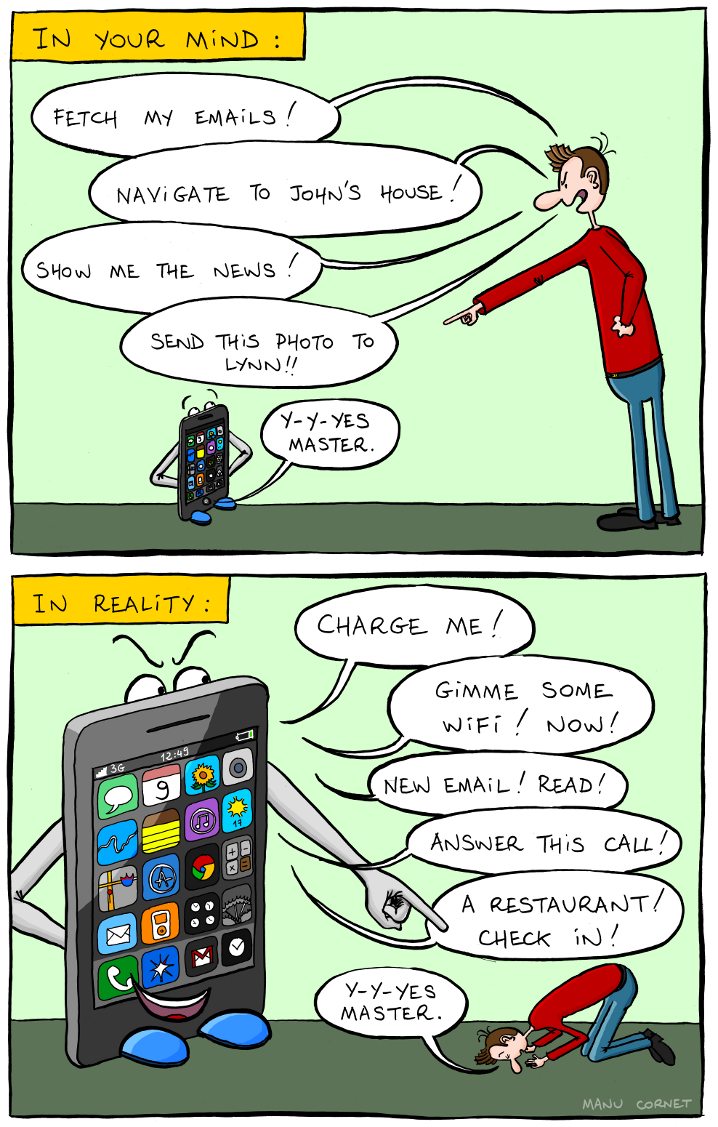

Notable events of 2014 in comics. It includes any relevant comics-related events, deaths of notable comics-related people, by conventions and first issues by title.

== Events ==
=== January ===
- January 16: Joann Sfar, Jean-Yves Ferri, Jean-Pierre Gibrat and comics festival curator Maurice Herve are elevated to Chevalier de l'Ordre des Arts et des Lettres.

=== March ===
- March 7: Mafalda becomes the first fictional character (and comics character) to be awarded with the Légion d'Honneur. On 22 March, her creator Quino is also honoured with the same award.
- March 8–9: During the Stripdagen in Gorinchem, Fred de Heij is awarded the Stripschapprijs, while the Hans P. Frankfurtherprijs is awarded to Rob van Bavel, chief editor of Eppo and publisher. The comics writer and translator Frits van der Heide wins the Bulletje en Boonestaakschaal.
- Bill Jemas founds Double Take Comics, a comic imprint for video game publisher and distributor Take-Two Interactive.
- March 12: The first episode of Georgia Dunn's Breaking Cat News is published.

=== April ===
- Specific date in April unknown: Mimi Pond's graphic novel Over Easy is published.

=== May ===
- May 15: The entire archive of Pieter J. Kuhn (Kapitein Rob) is donated to the archives of the city Groningen.
- May 27: A plate from a Tintin comic by Hergé is auctioned at the Artcurial in Paris and sold for €2.519 million ($3.434 million).

=== June ===
- A third attempt to launch a Lucky Luke magazine is made.

=== July ===
- July 5: Nero receives a comics mural in Antwerp.

=== August ===
- August 23: In Iran, cartoonist Atena Farghadani is jailed over a cartoon mocking the Iranian government. She is imprisoned until 6 November.
- August 30: Idaho Comics Group is founded.

=== September ===
- September 26: A financial settlement is reached between Marvel and the estate of Jack Kirby.

=== October ===
- October 2: Bas van der Schot wins the Inktspotprijs (edition 2003) for Best Political Cartoon.
- October 14: A Love Is... cartoon indicating that 'No' means 'maybe' and 'maybe' means 'yes' causes controversy for glorifying rape culture. The next day, The Chicago Sun issues an official apology.
- October 19: The final episode of Ed Stein's newspaper gag comic Freshly Squeezed appears in print.

=== November ===
- November 6: Atena Farghadani, imprisoned earlier this year for making a cartoon that mocked the Iranian government, is released from jail, but jailed again on 28 December after going public about her sentence and treatment in prison.

=== December ===
- December 17: A fire in Montréal, Canada, also ravages comics store Komico. They are forced to move to a new address afterwards.

=== Specific date unknown ===
- French comic writer Jean-David Morvan and South Korean artist Kim Jung Gi release the series SpyGames.
- Tom Fonder launches his webcomic Business Cat.
- Joris Vermassen releases his graphic novel Het Zotte Geweld (translated in English as Mad With Joy).

== Deaths ==
=== January ===
- January 8: Massimo Liorni, A.K.A Simo, A.K.A. Franco Carini, A.K.A. Lima(s), A.K.A. Max Liorn, Italian comics artist, writer and editor (Piccolo Boy, Natalino, Papotto, worked for Fratelli Spada), dies at age 88.
- January 16: Gary Arlington, American comics artist, editor, comics store owner and publisher (founder of the San Francisco Comic Book Company and one of the instigators of the underground comix movement), dies at age 75 from complications of diabetes, heart disease, obesity, and [a previously] crushed leg.
- January 21: Bill Kresse, American animator and comics artist (Super Duper), dies at age 80.
- January 25: Morrie Turner, American comics artist (Wee Pals), dies at age 90.
- January 28: Philippe Delaby, Belgian comics artist (Murena), dies at age 53 from heart failure.

=== February ===
- February 4: Henri Samouilov, French painter and comics artist, dies at age 83.
- February 8: Gill Van Dessel, a.k.a. Mister Kit, Belgian comics artist (Mister Kit Présente, worked on L'oncle Paul), dies at an unknown age.
- February 9: André-François Barbe, French comic artist, dies at age 77.
- February 12: Sid Caesar, American comedian and comics writer (Mad), dies at age 91.
- February 13: Gordon Bell, British comics artist (Pup Parade, Spoofer McGraw), dies at age 79 or 80.
- February 18: Ralston Jones, American comics artist (Mr. Abernathy), dies at age 87.
- February 19: Franco Origone, Italian comics artist (Nilus), dies at age 63.
- February 22: Leo Vroman, Dutch poet, scientist and comics artist (Stiemer en Stalma, Totie de Sphinx), dies at age 98.
- February 27: Jan Hoet, Belgian art curator (made comics together with photographer Rony Heirman), dies at age 77.

=== March ===
- March 16: Steve Moore, British comics writer (Axel Pressbutton, Future Shocks, Tom Strong's Terrific Tales), dies at age 64.
- March 24: David A. Trampier, American illustrator and comics artist (Wormy), dies at age 59.

=== April ===
- April 3: Fred Kida, American comics artist (assisted and continued Airboy, Steve Canyon, Captain America, The Amazing Spider-Man and Flash Gordon), dies at age 93.
- April 28: Barbara Fiske Calhoun, known professionally as "Barbara Hall," American comics artist (Black Cat, Girl Commandos, Pat Parker, worked for Harvey Comics), dies at age 94.
- April 29: Al Feldstein, American comics artist and editor (EC Comics, Mad), dies at age 88.

=== May ===
- May 2: Pom, Belgian comics artist (Piet Pienter en Bert Bibber), dies at age 94.
- May 4: Dick Ayers, American comics artist (inker of Sgt. Fury and his Howling Commandos), dies at age 90.
- May 12: H.R. Giger, Swiss illustrator, graphic designer, painter and illustrator (Alien (film)), dies at the age of 74.
- May 16: Guillem Cifré, Spanish comic artist, dies at age 61 or 62.
- May 18: Morris Weiss, American comics artist and writer (Margie, The Adventures of Pinkie Lee, continued Mickey Finn), dies at age 98.

=== June ===
- June 15:
  - Sören Axén, Swedish comics writer and artist (comics based on Pettson and Findus, continued Bamse, Disney comics), dies at age 74.
  - Daniel Keyes, American novelist and comics writer (Atlas, EC Comics), dies at age 86 from pneumonia.
- June 16: Charles Barsotti, American comics artist and cartoonist (The New Yorker, C. Barsotti's People, My Kind of People, P.J. McFey, Sally Bananas, Funny Form, Punchline USA, Broadsides, Emma June) dies at age 80 from brain cancer.
- June 24: Amadee Wohlschlaeger, American comics artist (continued Weatherbird), dies at age 102.
- June 25: Etta Hulme, American cartoonist, dies at age 90.

=== July ===
- July 1: Frank Cummings, Venezuelan-American comics artist (Brain Squirts, assisted on Blondie, published in Cracked), dies at age 54.
- July 29: Jo Teodorescu, Romanian illustrator and comics artist (Aventurile profesului Parbriz), dies at age 75.

=== August ===
- August 5: Pran Kumar Sharma, Indian comics artist (Daabu, Chacha Chaudhary, Shrimatiji, Raman and Bhagat Ji and Billoo, Pinki and Uncle Sulemani.), dies at age 75.
- August 13: Hal Campagna, American comics artist (continued Bringing Up Father), dies at age 101.
- August 25: Lars Mortimer, Swedish comics artist (Bobo, Hälge), dies at age 68.
- August 31: Stan Goldberg, American comics artist and colorist (Archie Comics, Marvel Comics ), dies at age 82.

=== September ===
- September 5: Paolo Del Vaglio, Italian comics artist (Pigy), dies at age 86.
- September 7: Frederic Mullally, British journalist, novelist and comics writer (Oh, Wicked Wanda!), dies at the age of 96.
- September 11: Antônio Cedraz, Brazilian comics artist (Xaxado, Lúbio, Turma do Joinha, Turma do Pipoca, Guris & Cia), dies at age 69.
- September 14: Tony Auth, American cartoonist and comics artist (Norb), dies at age 72 from brain cancer.

=== October ===
- October 1: Michel Demarets, Belgian comics artist (Studio Hergé, drew backgrounds, particularly cars, in The Adventures of Tintin), dies at age 79.
- October 15: Giorgio Rebuffi, Italian comics artist (Sceriffo Fox, Cucciolo, Pugacioff, Tiramolla, Trottolino), dies at age 95.
- October 18: Enrique Villagrán (Gómez Sierra), Argentine comics artist, dies at age 73 or 74.
- October 23:
  - Roland Vagnier, a.k.a. Bindle, French comics artist and cartoonist (Poustiquet), dies at age 95.
  - Marnix Rueb, Dutch comics artist (Haagse Harry), dies at age 59.
- October 26: Antonio Terenghi, Italian comics artist (Pedrito el Drito, Tarzanetto), dies at age 92.

=== November ===
- November 3: Jeremy Dale, American comics artist (G.I. Joe: A Real American Hero), dies at age 34.
- November 8: Hannes Hegen, German comics artist (Digedags), dies at age 89.
- November 28: Brumsic Brandon Jr., American comics artist (Luther), dies at age 87.

=== December ===
- December 4: Peter Woolcock, British comics artist and political cartoonist (Freddie Frog, Mr. Toad, continued Tiger Tim), dies at age 88 after being hit by a car.
- December 7: Marie Marcks, German caricaturist, cartoonist and comics artist, dies at age 92.
- December 16: Bruno De Dieuleveult, French comic artist (L'Affaire du Siècle), dies at age 72.
- December 18: Arno van Dijk, Dutch comics artist and illustrator, dies from cardiac arrest at the age of 69.

=== Specific date unknown ===
- José Geraldo Barreto, Brazilian comics artist (Rafles, Zé Candango), dies at age 89 or 90.
- Zoe Skiadaresi, Greek comics artist (Bampoudas), dies at age 82 or 83.

== Exhibitions ==
- 2 May – 19 August: Comics Unmasked: Art and Anarchy in the UK (British Library, London, UK) — curated by John Harris Dunning and Paul Gravett (as part of Comica Comiket) with the British Library's Head of Printed Historical Sources, Adrian Edwards and Dave McKean as artistic director; with events including: Bryan and Mary Talbot; Neil Gaiman with Tori Amos; Woodrow Phoenix; Dave McKean, Grant Morrison and Warren Ellis on superheroes; Melinda Gebbie; Alejandro Jodorowsky; Pat Mills, Dave Gibbons and Frazer Irving on 2000 AD; Robert Crumb and Gilbert Shelton plus those involved in the ‘Oz Trial’; Posy Simmonds and Steve Bell; and Bryan Lee O’Malley.
- September 25 – November 9: "From Here to Here: Richard McGuire Makes a Book" (Morgan Library & Museum, New York City, US) — exhibition tracking the process behind Richard McGuire's "Here" and expanding the story to a full-length graphic novel; produced in collaboration with the New York Public Library

== Conventions ==
- January 30 – February 2: Angoulême International Comics Festival (Angoulême, France)
- March 1: New York Comic Book Marketplace (Hotel New Yorker, New York City)
- March 1–2: STAPLE! (Marchesa Hall and Theater, Austin, Texas)
- March 21–23: MegaCon (Orange County Convention Center, Orlando, Florida) — guests include Stan Lee, John Barrowman, Torchwood’s Eve Myles and Gareth David-Lloyd, Manu Bennett, Karl Urban, The Walking Dead's David Morrissey, Danai Gurira, Steven Yeun, Emily Kinney, and Sonequa Martin-Green, Buffy's Eliza Dushku and James Marsters, Richard Hatch, Dirk Benedict, Battlestar Galacticas's Herbert Jefferson, Jr. and Anne Lockhart, Smallville's Allison Mack, John Glover and Laura Vandervoort, Wil Wheaton, Jon Heder, Jason David Frank, Ivy DoomKitty, Bryan Johnson, Comic Book Men's Ming Chen and Mike Zapcic, Matthew Senreich, Robot Chicken's Zeb Wells and Tom Root, Peter Mayhew, Vic Mignogna, Jennifer Hale, George Lowe, Phil Lamarr, Jim Cummings, Rob Paulsen, Quinton Flynn, Richard Horvitz, Tom Kane, and Arne Starr
- March 28–30: Emerald City Comicon (Washington State Convention Center, Seattle, Washington)
- April 4–6: St. Louis Comicon (America's Center, St Louis, Missouri)
- April 5–6: MoCCA Festival (69th Regiment Armory, New York City)
- April 12–13: Asbury Park Comic Con (Berkeley Oceanfront Hotel, Asbury Park, New Jersey) — guests included Jim Steranko, Chris Claremont, Ann Nocenti, J.H. Williams III, Cliff Chiang, Denis Kitchen, Mark Schultz, Box Brown, Andrew Aydin, Don McGregor, Jay Lynch, Jamal Igle, and Peter Bagge
- April 12–13: Small Press and Alternative Comics Expo (Ramada Plaza Hotel & Conference Center, Columbus, Ohio)
- April 17–19: Salt Lake Comic Con FanXperience (Salt Palace Convention Center, Salt Lake City, Utah) - guests include Patrick Stewart, Nathan Fillion, Karen Gillan, and Karl Urban
- April 18–20: WonderCon (Anaheim Convention Center, Anaheim, California)
- April 19: FLUKE Mini-Comics & Zine Festival (40 Watt, Athens, Georgia)
- April 25–27: C2E2 (McCormick Place Complex, Chicago, Illinois)
- May 10–11: Comic Expo (Brunel Old Station, Bristol, UK)
- May 10–11: Toronto Comic Arts Festival (Toronto Reference Library, Toronto, Canada)
- May 16–18: Dallas Comic Con (Dallas Convention Center, Dallas, Texas)
- May 16–18: Motor City Comic Con (Suburban Collection Showplace, Novi, Michigan)
- May 17: East Coast Black Age of Comics Convention (Enterprise Center, Philadelphia, Pennsylvania)
- May 31–June 1: Chicago Alternative Comics Expo [CAKE] (Center on Halsted, Chicago, Illinois) — special guests: Tony Millionaire, Edie Fake, Anya Davidson, Inés Estrada, Lizz Hickey, Hellen Jo
- June 5–8: Phoenix Comicon (Phoenix Convention Center, Phoenix, Arizona) — guests include Bruce Campbell, Nathan Fillion, John Barrowman, Adam West, John Rhys-Davies, Mark Sheppard, Don Rosa, Mark Bagley, Patrick Rothfuss, Danny Glover, John Ratzenberger, Stan Lee, Brian Posehn, Burt Ward, Julie Newmar, Todd McFarlane, Walter Jones, David Yost, Austin St. John, Richard Dean Anderson, Charlaine Harris, Manu Bennett, Dean Lorey, Crispin Freeman, Jim Butcher, Todd Haberkorn, Jason Spisak, Cary Elwes, Stephen Amell, Michael Rooker, Kelly Le Brock, Catherine Bach, Amber Benson, Dean Lorey, Sonny Strait, and Paul and Storm
- June 13–15: Denver Comic Con (Colorado Convention Center, Denver, Colorado) — 3rd annual event
- June 14–15: EternalCon (Garden City, Long Island, New York)
- June 14–15: New York Comic Fest (White Plains, New York) — produced by Crucial Comics)
- June 14–15: New York Comic Con Special Edition NYC (Javits Center, New York City)
- June 20–22: Heroes Convention (Charlotte Convention Center, Charlotte, North Carolina)
- June 20–22: Wizard World Philadelphia (Philadelphia, Pennsylvania))
- July 24–27: San Diego Comic-Con (San Diego Convention Center, San Diego, California)
- August 16: Comica Comiket (British Library, London, England) — exhibitors include Jade Sarson, Gareth Brookes, Hannah Berry, Amber Hsu, Cristian Ortiz, Knockabout Comics, Soaring Penguin, and The Dessinators; Drawing Parade participants include Sarson and Emmanuel Guibert
- August 21–24: Wizard World Chicago (Donald E. Stephens Convention Center, Rosemont, Illinois)
- August 29 – September 1: Dragon*Con (Atlanta, Georgia)
- September 4–6: Salt Lake Comic Con FanXperience (Salt Palace Convention Center, Salt Lake City, Utah)
- September 5–7: Baltimore Comic-Con (Baltimore Convention Center, Baltimore, Maryland)
- September 13–14: Small Press Expo (Bethesda North Marriott Hotel & Conference Center, North Bethesda, Maryland)
- September 27: Wildcat Comic Con (Pennsylvania College of Technology, Williamsport, Pennsylvania)
- October 4–5: Massachusetts Independent Comics Expo [MICE] (Lesley University, University Hall, Cambridge, Massachusetts) — special guests: Raina Telgemeier, James Kochalka, Dave Roman, Emily Carroll, Paul Hornschemeier, and Box Brown
- October 9–12: Komikazen (Ravenna, Italy) — guests include Eddie Campbell and Gipi
- October 9–12: New York Comic Con (Jacob K. Javits Convention Center, New York City)
- October 20–November 19: Comica — London International Comics Festival (various venues, London, UK) — guests include Jacques Tardi, Junko Mizuno, Carol Swain, Darryl Cunningham, E. M. Carroll, Jason Atomic, Pat Mills, Danny Dorling, Isabel Greenberg, ILYA, Rob Davis, Paul Rainey
- October 31–November 2: Comikaze Expo (Los Angeles Convention Center) — guests include Stan Lee, Elvira, Kevin Smith, Kevin Conroy, Burt Ward, Gwendoline Christie, Alfie Allen, Stephen Moyer, Kristin Bauer, Barbara Eden, Mindy Sterling, John Barrowman, Jewel Staite, Tara Strong, Howie Mandel, James Hong, Eric Roberts, Original Power Rangers (David Yost and Walter Emanuel Jones), Cast of AMC's Comic Book Men (Bryan Johnson, Mike Zapcic, Ming Chen, Robert Bruce), and Tommy Wiseau
- October 31 – November 2: Wizard World Ohio Comic Con (Greater Columbus Convention Center, Columbus, Ohio)
- November 1–2: Rhode Island Comic Con (Rhode Island Convention Center, Providence, Rhode Island) — guests included Karan Ashley, Colin Baker, Michael Biehn, Eliza Dushku, Gigi Edgley, David J. Fielding, Anthony Michael Hall, Richard Horvitz, Walter Koenig, Peter Mayhew, Eddie McClintock, Vic Mignogna, Samantha Newark, Nichelle Nichols, Ray Park, John Rhys-Davies, Saul Rubinek, William Shatner, Mark Sheppard, Orli Shoshan, Rikki Simons, Austin St. John, George Takei, Veronica Taylor, John Coppinger, Seth Gilliam, Michael Kingma, Michael Rooker, Scott Wilson, and Matthew Wood, Neal Adams, Jim Beaver, Belle Chere, Abby Fellows, Alaina Huffman, Destiny Nickelsen, Jonny Ruckus, Jim Steranko, Steven Williams, and Rick Worthy
- November 13–15: International Comic Arts Forum (Ohio State University, Billy Ireland Cartoon Library & Museum, Columbus, Ohio) — guests include John Lewis, Andrew Aydin, & Nate Powell, Phoebe Gloeckner, Hanneriina Moisseinen, Jeff Smith, Justin Green, Carol Tyler, Dash Shaw, and Tom Spurgeon
- November 30: Genghis Con (The Lake Erie Building, AKA: The Screw Factory, Lakewood, Ohio) — guests include Derf Backderf
- December 6: Comic Arts Los Angeles (Think Tank Gallery, Los Angeles, California) — inaugural event; featured guests: Sam Alden, Mimi Pond

== First issues by title ==
American Legends
Release: November by Top Cow. Artists: Studio Hive

Anne Bonnie
Release: March by Blue Juice Comics. Writer & Artist: Tim Yates

Bitch Planet
Release: December by Image Comics. Writer: Kelly Sue DeConnick, Valentine De Landro

Buffy the Vampire Slayer Season Ten
Release: March by Dark Horse Comics. Writers: Christos Gage, Nicholas Brendon, Victor Gischler, and Kel McDonald, Artists: Rebekah Isaacs, Karl Moline, Cliff Richards, Richard Corben, Megan Levens, Will Conrad, Derlis Santacruz

Chilling Adventures of Sabrina
Release October by Archie Comics. Writer: Roberto Aguirre-Sacasa, Artist: Robert Hack

Copperhead
Release: September by Image Comics. Writer: Jay Faerber, Artist: Scott Godlewski

Dark Horse Presents volume 4
Release: August by Dark Horse Comics. Editor Mike Richardson

The Fade Out
Release: August by Image Comics. Writer: Ed Brubaker Artist: Sean Phillips

Nailbiter
Release: May by Image Comics. Writer: Joshua Williamson, Mike Henderson Artist: Mike Henderson

Outcast by Kirkman and Azaceta
Release: June by Image Comics. Writer: Robert Kirkman Artist: Paul Azaceta

Serenity: Leaves on the Wind
Release: January by Dark Horse Comics. Writer: Zack Whedon Artist: Georges Jeanty

Wytches
Release: October by Image Comics. Writer: Scott Snyder Artist: Jock

== Graphic novels by title ==
Shackleton: Antarctic Odyssey
Release: March by First Second Books. Writer & Artist: Nick Bertozzi
