= Baldo (Italian comics) =

Fictional character created by Luciano Bottaro

Publication information
- Publisher: Edizioni Bianconi
- Genre: Humor/comedy

Creative team
- Created by: Luciano Bottaro

Baldo is the title character of an Italian comic series created by Luciano Bottaro. He is a Canadian Mountie.

== Background ==
It debuted in 1952, in the children magazine Gaie fantasie. Its stories were later published, until 1987, in a number of Edizioni Alpe (later Edizioni Bianconi) comic magazines, such as Tiramolla, Pepito and Cucciolo. Baldo was also the title character of a shortliving comic book series, published from 1979 to 1980.

The comic was also published with some success in France, between 1954 and 1982, by the editor Sagéditions. Many stories have been made specifically for the French market by Carlo Chendi as a writer and by Guido Scala and Giorgio Rebuffi as illustrators.
