= 1953 in comics =

Notable events of 1953 in comics.

== Events and publications ==
=== Year overall ===
- National Comics Publications v. Fawcett Publications is settled out of court; Fawcett agrees to quit using the Captain Marvel character(s) and pay DC Comics the sum of $400,000. Subsequently, Fawcett leaves the comics publishing business.
- Tut le Blanc's comic strip An Altar Boy Named Speck is first syndicated.
- The first episode of Yaakov Ashman and Elisheva Nadal's Gidi Gezer is published.

=== January ===
- January 9: Héctor Germán Oesterheld and Hugo Pratt's Sergeant Kirk makes its debut in the comics magazine Misterix.
- January 20: In the story Avventura nell’Utah by Gian Luigi Bonelli and Galep, Tex Willer becomes supreme chief of the Navajo under the name “Night Eagle”.

=== February ===
- February 7: The first issue of the British comics magazine The Topper is published, which will run until 15 September 1990. In its first issue David Law's Beryl the Peril makes its debut.
- February 23: The Nero story De Ring van Petatje by Marc Sleen is first published in the newspapers. Halfway the story Petatje makes her debut.
- February 24: Byron Aptosoglou publishes Mikrós Íros (The Little Hero), which will run until 18 June 1968.
- February 25: The Flemish children's magazine Pum-Pum becomes a supplement of the newspaper Het Laatste Nieuws. It will run until 11 January 1967.
- In Walt Disney’s comics and stories Carl Barks' Donald Duck story Flip decision April, May and June make their debut.
- Journey into Mystery (1952 series) #5 - Atlas Comics

=== March ===
- March 9: Elliott Caplin and Stan Drake's The Heart of Juliet Jones makes its debut. It will run until 1 January 2000.
- Jumbo Comics (1938 series), with issue #167, canceled by Fiction House.
- in Four Color, Back to the Klondike and Somethin' Fishy Here by Carl Barks; in the first story Goldie O'Gilt makes her debut.
- Journey into Mystery (1952 series) #6 - Atlas Comics

=== April ===
- April 1: The fourth issue of Mad Magazine features Harvey Kurtzman and Wally Wood's classic Superman parody Superduperman. This is the first specific comic book parody in Mad and strikes a nerve among readers. The previously low-selling Mad now finally becomes a best-seller.
- April 15: first issue of Collana Arco (Edizioni Audace), Italian western series without a fixed protagonist.
- April 18: Barrie Appleby's Roger the Dodger makes its debut in The Beano.
- April 30: The first issue of Chez Nous Junior, a junior supplement to the Belgian magazine Chez Nous and a French-language version of the Dutch-language magazine Ons Volkske is published. In the first issue Tibet's Chick Bill makes its debut, albeit in a talking animal comic strip version. The cast will be humanized two years later.
- Master Comics, with issue #133, cancelled by Fawcett.
- Journey into Mystery (1952 series) #7 - Atlas Comics

=== May ===
- May 5: First issue of the Italian series Kociss (Tomasina), one of the few Western comics with a Native American as a protagonist.
- May 30: In Charles M. Schulz' Peanuts Lucy van Pelt is first seen trying to get Schroeder's romantic attention. This will become a running gag in the series.
- Rolf Kauka's Fix and Foxi makes its debut.
- Journey into Mystery (1952 series) #8 - Atlas Comics

=== June ===
- June 9: In West Germany, the Bundesprüfstelle für jugendgefährdende Medien is established, a censorship commission targeting youth-oriented media, including comics.
- June 23: The first issue of the western series Il Cavaliere Nero (The Black cCvalier, Edizioni Audace) written by Gian Luigi Bonelli and drawn by EsseGesse is published.
- Whiz Comics, with issue #155, canceled by Fawcett.
- Captain Marvel Jr., with issue #118, canceled by Fawcett.
- Journey into Mystery (1952 series) #9 - Atlas Comics

=== July ===
- July 15: first issue of Tiramolla (Edizioni Alpe),
- .Lorna the Jungle Girl, issue #1, created by Don Rico and Werner Roth.
- Journey into Mystery (1952 series) #10 - Atlas Comics

=== August ===
- August 5: in Le journal de Tinitn, first chapter of The yellow M, by Edgar Pierre Jacobs.
- August 8: In David Law's Dennis the Menace and Gnasher Walter Brown makes his debut.
- August 25: first strip of Mickey's Dangerous Double, by Bill Walsh and Floyd Gottfredson.
- August 29: Mars Ravelo's Bondying makes its debut.
- Journey into Mystery (1952 series) #11 - Atlas Comics

=== September ===
- September 12: The final issue of the British comics magazine Illustrated Chips is published and merges with Film Fun.
- September 19: Paddy Brennan's General Jumbo makes its debut in The Beano.
- September 22: The passing of H. T. Webster also means the end of his long-running comic strip Timid Soul, better known under the name of its protagonist, Casper Milquetoast.
- Four Color 495; it includes two classic Carl Barks’ stories, The Round Money Bin and The Horseradish Story.
- The British comics magazine Comic Cuts is disestablished and merges with Knockout.
- The first issue of Little Dot is published, in which Richie Rich makes his debut.
- Joe Kubert and Norman Maurer's Tor makes its debut.
- Journey into Mystery (1952 series) #12 - Atlas Comics

=== October ===
- October 1: The first issues of the Dutch children's and comics magazines Okki and Taptoe are published. The magazines will run until 2016.
- October 10: Leo Baxendale's Little Plum makes its debut in The Beano.

=== November ===
- November 10: in Topolino, Romano Scarpa makes his debut as Disney author, drawing Biancaneve e Verdefiamma, a sequel to Snow White and the seven dwarfs, written by Guido Martina.
- Captain Marvel Adventures (1941 series), with issue #150, canceled by Fawcett Comics.
- Hopalong Cassidy, with issue #85, canceled by Fawcett Comics.
- Two-Gun Kid (1948 series), with issue #11, revived by Marvel.
- Weird Fantasy, with issue #22, merges with Weird Science to become Weird Science-Fantasy (EC Comics)

=== December ===
- December 4: The Spirou and Fantasio story La Turbotraction is first prepublished in Spirou. Halfway the story Seccotine the journalist makes her debut.
- December 19: Leo Baxendale's Minnie the Minx makes its debut in The Beano.
- December 20: in the French magazine Vaillant, debut of Arthur le fantome justicer (Arthur the Ghost of Justice) by Jean Cezard
- December 23: Willy Vandersteen's gag comic 't Prinske debuts in Tintin.
- The long-running comics series Waddles is discontinued. Ray Carlson and Carol Hager had continued it since 1945.
- In Uncle Scrooge, The Menehune Mystery by Carl Barks.
- Journey into Mystery (1952 series) #13 - Atlas Comics

== Births ==
=== April ===
- April 3: Pieter Aspe, Belgian novelist and comics writer (wrote comics in collaboration with cartoonists like Kim Duchateau, Marec, Merho and Patrick van Oppen), (d. 2021).
- April 3: Tiziano Sclavi, Italian comic writer, creator of Dylan Dog.
- April 12: Tanino Liberatore, Italian cartoonist.

=== November ===
- November 18: Alan Moore, British comic book writer (DC Comics, WildStorm).

== Deaths ==
=== January ===
- January 5: Ramiz Gökçe, Turkish comics artist (Tombul Teyze and Sıska Dayı), dies at age 52.
- January 12: Wilfred R. Cyr, American comics artist (Cabin Boy Exploits of Eve), dies at age 73.
- January 23:
  - Raymond De La Nezière, French illustrator and comics artist, dies at age 85.
  - Albert Hahn Jr., Dutch illustrator, caricaturist and comics artist (made text comics for De Notenkraker), dies at age 68.

=== February ===
- February 14: Mary Bergman, wife of cartoonist Billy DeBeck and establisher of the annual Billy De Beck Awards, dies in a plane crash.
- February 18: Charles Small, American comics artist (continued Salesman Sam), dies.
- February 23: Wilmer "Tut" LeBlanc, American comics artist (An Altar Boy Named Speck), dies at age 38.

=== April ===
- April 18: Frank Reynolds, British cartoonist and illustrator (The Bristlewoods), dies at age 67.

=== May ===
- May 5: Dick Dorgan, American comics artist (Kid Dugan, Colonel Gilfeather, continued You Know Me, Al), dies at age 60.
- May 11: Hermann Schütz, German painter, illustrator and comic artist (Der Contibuben), dies at age 77.
- May 25: Charles Quinlan, a.k.a. Carl Quinn, American comics artist (worked for Funnies Inc., L.B. Cole Studio and Sangor Studio), dies at age 52.

=== June ===
- June 20: Émile-Joseph Pinchon, French comics artist (Bécassine), dies at age 72.

=== July ===
- July 24: Eelco Harmsen van der Beek, Dutch illustrator and comics artist (Flipje van Tiel), dies at age 56.
- July 31: Kornel Makuszyński, Polish novelist and comics writer (Koziołek Matołek), dies at age 69.

=== October ===
- October 2: Les Forgrave, American comics artist (Big Sister) and writer (Aladdin Junior, Secrets of Magic), dies at age 71.
- October 21: George Kerr, American comics artist and illustrator (Santa Claus Funnies), dies at age 84.

=== November ===
- November 29: Karl Arnold, German painter, caricaturist and comics artist (made various comics for Simplicissimus), dies at age 70.
- November 29: Milt Gross, American comics artist (He Done Her Wrong, Count Screwloose), dies at age 58.

=== December ===
- December 17: Stephen Slesinger, American radio, film and TV producer and comics writer (Red Ryder, King of the Royal Mounted), dies at age 51.
- December 25: William Haselden, British caricaturist, cartoonist and comics artist (The Sad Experiences of Big and Little Willie), dies at age 81.

=== Specific date unknown ===
- Curt Junghändel, German illustrator, dies at age 78 or 79.
- Leon Kern, French caricaturist and comics artist (La Famille Pouic), dies at age 69 or 70.

== First issues by title ==
=== Atlas Comics/Marvel Comics ===
- Bible Tales for Young Folk
- Buck Duck
- Crazy
- Homer Hooper
- Little Lizzie
- Lorna the Jungle Queen
- Menace (Mar.)
- Monkey and the Bear, The
- Patsy and her Pals
- Secret Story Romances
- Speed Carter, Spaceman
- Wendy Parker Comics

=== Other publishers ===
- Atomic Mouse (Mar.) — Charlton Comics
- Classics Illustrated Junior (Oct.) — Gilberton
- Little Dot (Sept.) — Harvey Comics
- Princess Knight, by Osamu Tezuka, first serialized in Kodansha's Shōjo Club (Jan.)
- The Topper #1 (Feb. 7) - D.C. Thomson and Co.
- Uncle Scrooge (Dec.) — Dell Comics

== Renamed titles ==
=== Atlas Comics/Marvel Comics ===
- Battle Brady #10 renamed from Men in Action
- Bible Tales for Young People #3 renamed from Bible Tales for Young Folk
- Combat Casey #6 renamed from War Combat
- Miss America #50 renamed from Miss America Magazine
- Young Men #21 renamed from Young Men on the Battlefield
- Young Men in Action #24 renamed from Young Men

=== Other publishers ===
- United States Marines #7-11 renamed from Fighting Leathernecks - Toby Press

== Initial appearances by character name ==
=== DC Thomson & Co. ===
- Beryl the Peril, in The Topper #1 (Feb. 7)
- General Jumbo, in The Beano #583 (19 Sept.)
- Little Plum, in The Beano #586 (10 Oct.)
- Minnie the Minx, in The Beano #596 (19 Dec.)
- Roger the Dodger, in The Beano #561 (18 Apr.)

=== Other publishers ===
- Atomic Mouse, in Atomic Mouse #1 (Charlton Comics, Mar.)
- Captain 3-D, in Captain 3-D #1 (Harvey Comics, Dec.)
- Captain Harlock, in Adventures of a Honeybee
- Little Lotta, in Little Dot #1 (Harvey Comics, Sept.)
- Richie Rich, in Little Dot #1 (Harvey Comics, Sept.)
- Ringo Kid, in The Ringo Kid Western #1 (Atlas Comics, Aug.)
- Superduperman, in Mad #4 (EC, Apr./May)
- Zombie, in Menace #5 (Atlas Comics, July)
