= 1963 in comics =

Notable events of 1963 in comics.

== Events ==
=== Year overall ===
- In Italy, Diabolik, started softly the previous year, becomes a growing success and finds its definitive shape. In a series of classic stories (The elusive criminal, Diabolik arrested, Atrocious revenge, Buried alive) Diabolik begins to use the Jaguar E-Type, the rubber masks and the shelters, leaves his cover identity as Walter Dorian, ends dramatically his affair with the nurse Elisabeth Gray and begins a long love-story with Eva Kant.

=== January ===
- January 26: The first issue of the British comics magazine Boys' World is published. It will run until 1964.
- The first issue of the Catholic magazine Messaggero dei ragazzi (The Boys’ herald) is published in Padua by the Friars Minor of the Basilica of Saint Anthony. In the next decades, the magazine, in spite of its limited distribution, will host the works of important cartoonists such as Dino Battaglia and Hugo Pratt.
- Sergio Aragones makes his debut in MAD Magazine #76.
- Jack Miller and Joe Certa's Zook makes his debut.
- Fantastic Four (1961 series) #10 – Marvel Comics
- The Incredible Hulk (1962 series) #5 – Marvel Comics
- Journey into Mystery (1952 series) #88 – Marvel Comics
- Kid Colt Outlaw (1948 series) #108 – Marvel Comics
- Strange Tales (1951 series) #104 – Marvel Comics
- Tales of Suspense (1959 series) #37 – Marvel Comics
- Tales to Astonish (1959 series) #39 – Marvel Comics
- Two-Gun Kid (1948 series) #61 – Marvel Comics
- The Purple Smurfs (original title Les Schtroumpfs noirs), by Peyo, first album of the Smurfs.
- Oddbal Odissey by Carl Barks, on Uncle Scrooge.

=== February ===
- February 16: The final issue of the British comics magazine Knockout is published, after which it merges with Valiant.
- February 4: The first chapter of Jacovitti’s Baby Rocket, about the interstellar adventures of a half-notch gangster, is published in Il giorno dei ragazzi.
- February 7: The first episode of Asterix and the Banquet by Goscinny and Uderzo, is prepublished in Pilote. The story marks the debut of Dogmatix, Obelix' dog.
- Fantastic Four (1961 series) #11 – Marvel Comics
- Journey into Mystery (1952 series) #89 – Marvel Comics
- Magnus, Robot Fighter 4000 A.D. marks the debut of Russ Manning's Magnus Robot Fighter.
- Rawhide Kid (1955 series) #32 – Marvel Comics
- Strange Tales (1951 series) #105 – Marvel Comics
- Tales of Suspense (1959 series) #38 – Marvel Comics
- Tales to Astonish (1959 series) #40 – Marvel Comics

=== March ===
- March 2: The final issue of the British comics magazine Swift is published. It merges with Eagle afterwards.
- March 3: In L'arresto di Diabolik, the third issue of Angela Giussani and Luciana Giussani's Diabolik, Eva Kant makes her debut. Because this story, the two sisters endure a proceedings for "incitement to corruption".
- March 10–17: The story Topolino e l’uomo di Altacraz (Mickey and the man of Altacraz), by Romano Scarpa is first prepublished in Topolino, a story vaguely inspired by Birdman of Alcatraz.
- March 18: Jerry Marcus' Trudy makes its debut. It will run until 2000.
- The Amazing Spider-Man (1963 series) #1 – Marvel Comics
- Fantastic Four (1961 series) #12 – Marvel Comics (First battle of The Thing and The Hulk)
- The Incredible Hulk (1962 series) #6 – Marvel Comics
- Journey into Mystery (1952 series) #90 – Marvel Comics
- Kid Colt Outlaw (1948 series) #109 – Marvel Comics
- Strange Tales (1951 series) #106 – Marvel Comics
- Tales of Suspense (1959 series) #39 – Marvel Comics – First appearance of Iron Man
- Tales to Astonish (1959 series) #41 – Marvel Comics
- Two-Gun Kid (1948 series) #62 – Marvel Comics
- Uncle Scrooge (1953 series) – Dell; "Uncle Scrooge, The Status Seeker" by Carl Barks

=== April ===
- April 13: The first issue of the Flemish children's magazine Ohee is published, supplement of the newspaper Het Volk. It will run until 31 December 1977.
- Black Cat (1946 series), with issue #65, canceled by Harvey Comics
- Fantastic Four (1961 series) #13 – Marvel Comics
- Journey into Mystery (1952 series) #91 – Marvel Comics
- Metal Men #1 (April/May cover-date) – DC Comics
- Rawhide Kid (1955 series) #33 – Marvel Comics
- Strange Tales (1951 series) #107 – Marvel Comics
- Tales of Suspense (1959 series) #40 – Marvel Comics
- Tales to Astonish (1959 series) #42 – Marvel Comics

=== May ===
- May 13: The first episode of Peter O'Donnell and Jim Holdaway's Modesty Blaise is published.
- May 23: Mars Ravelo and Jim Fernandez's Captain Barbell makes his debut.
- May 25: The final episode of Oskar Lebeck and Alden McWilliams' newspaper comic Twin Earths is published.
- May 27: The first episode of El botones Sacarino by Francisco Ibáñez Talavera is published in the magazine El DDT. The series will run until 1982.
- The Amazing Spider-Man (1963 series) #2 – Marvel Comics
- Fantastic Four (1961 series) #14 – Marvel Comics
- Journey into Mystery (1952 series) #92 – Marvel Comics
- Kid Colt Outlaw (1948 series) #110 – Marvel Comics
- Sgt. Fury (1963 series) #1 – Marvel Comics. First appearance of Sgt. Fury and his Howling Commandos.
- Strange Tales (1951 series) #108 – Marvel Comics
- Tales of Suspense (1959 series) #41 – Marvel Comics
- Tales to Astonish (1959 series) #43 – Marvel Comics
- Two-Gun Kid (1948 series) #63 – Marvel Comics

=== June ===
- June 1: The final episode of Mort Walker and Jerry Dumas' Sam's Strip is published.
- June 8: The final episode of Ken Reid's Jonah is published in The Beano.
- June 11: The final episode of Andries Brandt's Holle Pinkel is published.
- June 13: The first issue of Il pioniere dell’Unità, (comic supplement to the PCI official newspaper L’unità) is published; it takes the place of the magazine Il pioniere.
- June 16: The first issue of ABC dei ragazzi (The boys’ ABC, supplement to the weekly magazine ABC), is published in Milan.
- June 25: The first episode of Rik Clément's detective comic Jan Knap appears in 't Kapoentje.
- Fantastic Four (1961 series) #15 – Marvel Comics
- Journey into Mystery (1952 series) #93 – Marvel Comics
- My Greatest Adventure #80 – DC Comics – first appearance of the Doom Patrol, created by Arnold Drake, Bob Haney and Bruno Premiani.
- Rawhide Kid (1955 series) #34 – Marvel Comics
- Strange Tales (1951 series) #109 – Marvel Comics
- Strange Tales Annual (1962 series) #2 – Marvel Comics
- Tales of Suspense (1959 series) #42 – Marvel Comics
- Tales to Astonish (1959 series) #44 – Marvel Comics
  - First appearance of the Wasp
- Young Love #38 (June/July issue) – final issue published by Prize Comics; title sold to and continued by DC Comics
- Young Romance #124 (June/July issue) – final issue published by Prize Comics; title sold to and continued by DC Comics
- A Duck's-eye View of Europe, by Carl Barks, on Walt Disney's Comics and Stories..

=== July ===
- July 8: Alex Graham's Fred Basset makes its debut.
- July 21: in L’isola della Paura (Fear island) by Guido Nolitta and Gallieno Ferri two important recurring characters of Zagor universe, the mad doctor Hellinger and the nice cheater Trampy, make their debut.
- The Amazing Spider-Man (1963 series) #3 – Marvel Comics
  - First appearance of Doctor Octopus
- Fantastic Four (1961 series) #16 – Marvel Comics
- Gunsmoke Western (1955 series), with issue #77, canceled by Marvel Comics
- Journey into Mystery (1952 series) #94 – Marvel Comics
- Kid Colt Outlaw (1948 series) #111 – Marvel Comics
- Sgt. Fury (1963 series) #2 – Marvel Comics
- Strange Tales (1951 series) #110 – Marvel Comics
  - First appearance of Doctor Strange, Ancient One & Nightmare (Marvel Comics)
- Tales of Suspense (1959 series) #43 – Marvel Comics
- Tales to Astonish (1959 series) #45 – Marvel Comics
- Two-Gun Kid (1948 series) #64 – Marvel Comics

=== August ===
- August 8: The first episode of Jacques Devos' Génial Olivier is published in Spirou.
- Fantastic Four (1961 series) #17 – Marvel Comics
- House of Secrets #61 – DC Comics. First appearance of Eclipso by writer Bob Haney and artist Lee Elias
- Journey into Mystery (1952 series) #95 – Marvel Comics
- Justice League of America #21 – the first team-up of the Justice League and the Justice Society of America as well as the first use of the term "Crisis" in reference to a crossover between Golden Age and Silver Age characters.
- Rawhide Kid (1955 series) #35 – Marvel Comics
- Strange Tales (1951 series) #111 – Marvel Comics
  - First appearance of Baron Mordo and Asbestos Man.
- Tales of Suspense (1959 series) #44 – Marvel Comics
- Tales to Astonish (1959 series) #46 – Marvel Comics
- Young Romance #125 (August/September issue) – DC Comics, continuing numbering from Prize Comics series

=== September ===
- The Amazing Spider-Man (1963 series) #4 – Marvel Comics
  - First appearance of Sandman
- Avengers (1963 series) #1 – Marvel Comics
  - First appearance of Avengers
- Fantastic Four (1961 series) #18 – Marvel Comics
  - First appearance of Super-Skrull
- Fantastic Four Annual (1963 series) #1 – Marvel Comics
  - Reintroduction of Atlantis into Marvel Comics continuity.
- Green Lantern #23 – DC Comics
- Journey into Mystery (1952 series) #96 – Marvel Comics
- Kid Colt Outlaw (1948 series) #112 – Marvel Comics
- Sgt. Fury (1963 series) #3 – Marvel Comics
- Strange Tales (1951 series) #112 – Marvel Comics
- Tales of Suspense (1959 series) #45 – Marvel Comics
  - First appearance of Jack Frost, Happy Hogan, and Pepper Potts
- Tales to Astonish (1959 series) #47 – Marvel Comics
- Two-Gun Kid (1948 series) #65 – Marvel Comics
- Uncanny X-Men (1963 series) #1 – Marvel Comics
  - First appearance of the X-Men (Consisting of Professor X, Angel, Beast, Cyclops, Marvel Girl, and Iceman) and Magneto
- Young Love #39 (September/October issue) – DC Comics, continuing numbering from Prize Comics series

=== October ===
- October 17: The first episode of the Lucky Luke story Les Dalton se rachètent, by Goscinny and Morris, is prepublished in Spirou.
- October 20: An episode of Charles M. Schulz' Peanuts which pokes fun at school prayer causes controversy and angry readers' letters.
- October 31: Jean Giraud and Jean-Michel Charlier's Blueberry is first published in Pilote.
- The Amazing Spider-Man (1963 series) #5 – Marvel Comics
- Fantastic Four (1961 series) #19 – Marvel Comics
  - First appearance of Pharaoh Rama-Tut
- Journey into Mystery (1952 series) #97 – Marvel Comics
- Rawhide Kid (1955 series) #36 – Marvel Comics
- Strange Tales (1951 series) #113 – Marvel Comics
- Tales of Suspense (1959 series) #46 – Marvel Comics
- Tales to Astonish (1959 series) #48 – Marvel Comics

=== November ===
- November 4: The comic strip Miss Caroline: The Little Girl in the Big White House by Gerald Gardner and Frank B. Johnson is launched. It depicts the life of Caroline Kennedy, the daughter of US President John F. Kennedy.
- November 7: Greg's Achille Talon makes its debut.
- November 16: The British comics magazine The Wizard merges with The Rover and becomes Rover and Wizard, under which title it will continue until August 1969.
- November 22: Miss Caroline: The Little Girl in the Big White House is cancelled after John F. Kennedy is assassinated.
- The Amazing Spider-Man (1963 series) #6 – Marvel Comics
  - First appearance of Lizard and Billy Connors.
- Avengers (1963 series) #2 – Marvel Comics
- Fantastic Four (1961 series) #20 – Marvel Comics
- Journey into Mystery (1952 series) #98 – Marvel Comics
  - First appearance of Cobra
- Kid Colt Outlaw (1948 series) #113 – Marvel Comics
- Sgt. Fury (1963 series) #4 – Marvel Comics
- Strange Tales (1951 series) #114 – Marvel Comics
  - Begins monthly Doctor Strange back-up story
- Tales of Suspense (1959 series) #47 – Marvel Comics
- Tales to Astonish (1959 series) #49 – Marvel Comics
  - First appearance of Hank Pym as Giant-Man
- Two-Gun Kid (1948 series) #66 – Marvel Comics
- Uncanny X-Men (1963 series) #2 – Marvel Comics

=== December ===
- December 5: The first episode of Asterix and Cleopatra, by Goscinny and Uderzo, is prepublished in Pilote..
- December 12: A tiny dog, introduced in René Goscinny and Albert Uderzo's Astérix album Asterix and the Banquet earlier this year, receives a name through a readers' contest: Dogmatix, which is first revealed to the public in an issue of Pilote.
- December 12: The final episode of Clarence D. Russell's Pete the Tramp is published.
- December 18: The final issue of the Flemish comics magazine, De Kleine Zondagsvriend is published.
- The Amazing Spider-Man (1963 series) #7 – Marvel Comics
- Fantastic Four (1961 series) #21 – Marvel Comics
  - First appearance of Hate-Monger, First Nick Fury in present-day
- Journey into Mystery (1952 series) #99 – Marvel Comics
- Rawhide Kid (1955 series) #37 – Marvel Comics
- Strange Tales (1951 series) #115 – Marvel Comics
- Tales of Suspense (1959 series) #48 – Marvel Comics
  - First appearance of Iron Man's red & gold armor
- Tales to Astonish (1959 series) #50 – Marvel Comics
- In Italy, the first issue of Braccio di Ferro (Bianconi), containing Popeye’s adventures written by Italian authors, produced by Classici Audacia (Mondadori) is published.
- The first issue of the Italian monthly Il Piccolo Ranger is published (Bonelli).

=== Specific date unknown ===
- DC Comics purchases two Prize Comics romance titles, Young Love and Young Romance, continuing their numbering.
- Shueisha publishes Margaret.
- Alfredo Alcala's Voltar makes its debut.
- Jim Berry's Berry's World debuts.
- Mauricio de Sousa's The Funnies (Monica's Gang) and The Tribe (Monica's Gang) and Horacio's World debut.
- The final issue of the Argentine comics magazine Hora Cero is published.
- The final episode of Malcolm Judge's Colonel Crackpot's Circus is published.
- The final episode of Horace Boyten, Stewart Pride and Evelyn Flinders' The Silent Three is published.
- The final episode of Birgitta Lilliehöök's Spara och Slösa is published.
- The final episode of Brian Lewis' The Suicide Six is published.
- The final episode of Al Jaffee's Tall Tales is published.

== Deaths ==
=== January ===
- January 2: Joaquín Buigas, Spanish comics writer (La familia Ulises), dies at age 76.
- January 18: Francisco Valença, Portuguese comics artist and illustrator, dies at age 80.

=== February ===
- February 18: Vadim Lazarkevich, Russian-Bulgarian illustrator and comics artist (Vesel Putniks Balloon, The Little Barber), dies at age 67.
- February 26: Charles Folkard, British illustrator and comics artist (Teddy Tail), dies at age 84.

=== March ===
- March 23: Maurice Boyer, a.k.a. Moriss, French actor, comedian, illustrator, caricaturist and cartoonist, dies at age 88.
- Specific date in March unknown: Koos Schadée, Dutch comics artist and illustrator, dies at an unknown age.

=== May ===
- May 3: Alejandro Del Prado, a.k.a. Calé, Argentine cartoonist and comics artist (Buenos Aires Intimo), dies at age 37.

=== July ===
- July 2: Alicia Patterson, American publisher and comics writer (Deathless Deer), dies at age 56 of complications following stomach surgery for an ulcer.
- July 7: François-Joseph Herman, Belgian comics artist (worked for Studio Vandersteen and made several one-shot stories of his own for Tintin), dies at age 31.

=== August ===
- August 16: Ralph Fuller, American comics artist (Oaky Doaks), dies at age 73.
- August 30: Jan Lunde, Norwegian comics artist (Pappa og Pjokken, Skomakker Bekk of Tvililligene Hans, Professor Skjeel, Dimpen og Dumpen), dies at age 74.
- August 31: Willem Gerrit van de Hulst Sr., Dutch novelist and comics writer (In de Soete Suikerbol), dies at age 83.

=== September ===
- September 19: David Low, New Zealand-British cartoonist and comics artist (Colonel Blimp), dies at age 62.
- September 20: Jan Wiegman, Dutch comics artist and illustrator, dies at age 79.

=== October ===
- October 9: Leonard Sansone, American comics artist (Wolf Man, Willie), dies in a traffic accident at age 46.
- October 23: Clarence D. Russell, American comics artist (Pete the Tramp, The Tucker Twins), dies at age 68.
- October 25: Lewis Baumer, British caricaturist, cartoonist, illustrator and comics artist, dies at age 93.

=== December ===
- December 1: Jimmy Hatlo, American comics artist (They'll Do It Every Time, Little Iodine), dies at age 65.
- December 12: Wynne W. Davies, Australian illustrator and comics artist (The Strange Adventures of Percy the Pommy), dies at age 71.
- December 18: Bruce Russell, a.k.a. Bruce Barr, American sports cartoonist and comics artist (Rollo Rollingstone), dies at age 60.

=== Specific date unknown ===
- Shaka Bontaro, Japanese comic artist (drew an illegal Mickey Mouse comic), dies at age 71 or 72.
- Gilbert Lawford Dalton, British comics writer (Wilson the Wonder Athlete), dies at age 48 or 49.
- Andrés Guevara, Paraguayan illustrator and comics artist (Blanca Nieve y Pío-Pío), dies at age 58 or 59.
- Katsuishi Kabashima, Japanese illustrator and comic artist (The Adventures of Sho-Chan), dies at age 74 or 75.
- Harry Mace, American comics artist (Amy), dies at age 40.
- Arthur Mansbridge, British illustrator and comics artist (worked for the magazine Golden), dies at age 85.
- Norman McMurray, Australian comic artist (Fish and Chips, Googles), dies at age 72 or 73.
- Pierre Saint-Loup, French comic artist (L'Oncle Pacifique), dies at age 68 or 69.
- Les Such, Australian comics artist (Buster Braddock, Rip Weston), dies at age 62 or 63.
- Arnold Warden, British comics artist (Snowdrop's Zoo, Tuffy and His Magic Tail), dies at age 70 or 71.

== Awards ==
=== National Cartoonists Society Division Awards ===
- Newspaper Comic Strips (Humor): Barney Google and Snuffy Smith, by Fred Lasswell
- Newspaper Comic Strips (Story): On Stage, by Leonard Starr
- Newspaper Panel Cartoons: Still Life, by Jerry Robinson
- Animation: Walt Disney
- Gag Cartoons: Jack Tippit
- Comic Books: Frank Thorne
- Advertising and Illustration: Harry Devlin
- Editorial Cartoons: John Fischetti
- Sports Cartoons: Lou Darvas
- Reuben Award: Barney Google, by Fred Lasswell

== First issues by title ==
=== DC Comics ===
Metal Men

Release: April/May. Writer: Robert Kanigher. Artist: Ross Andru & Mike Esposito

=== Marvel Comics ===
The Amazing Spider-Man

Release: March. Writer: Stan Lee. Artist: Steve Ditko

The Avengers

Release: September. Writer: Stan Lee. Artist: Jack Kirby

Sgt. Fury and his Howling Commandos

Release: May. Writer: Stan Lee. Artist: Jack Kirby

The X-Men

Release: September. Writer: Stan Lee. Artist: Jack Kirby

=== Other publishers ===
Das Kampf

Release: by Vaughn Bodē (self-published). Writer/Artist: Vaughn Bodē

== Initial appearance by character name ==
=== DC Comics ===
- Catman, in Detective Comics #311 (January)
- Chief, in My Greatest Adventure #80 (June)
- Chlorophyll Kid, in Adventure Comics #306 (March)
- Doctor Polaris, in Green Lantern #21 (June)
- Eclipso, in House of Secrets #61 (August)
- Elasti-Girl, in My Greatest Adventure #80 (June)
- Element Lad, in Adventure Comics #307 (April)
- Fire Lad, in Adventure Comics #306 (March)
- General Immortus, in My Greatest Adventure #80 (June)
- Heat Wave, in The Flash #140 (November)
- Lightning Lass, in Adventure Comics #308 (May)
- Mera, in Aquaman #11 (October)
- Negative Man, in My Greatest Adventure #80 (June)
- Night Girl, in Adventure Comics #306 (March)
- Paul Gambi, in The Flash #141 (December)
- Polar Boy, in Adventure Comics #306 (March)
- Queen Bee, in Justice League of America #23 (November)
- Rainbow Girl, in Adventure Comics #309 (June)
- Reverse-Flash, in The Flash #139 (September)
- Robotman (Cliff Steele), in My Greatest Adventure #80 (June)
- Ron-Karr, in Adventure Comics #314 (November)
- Shark, in Green Lantern #24 (October)
- Simon Hurt, in Batman #156 (June)
- Stone Boy, in Adventure Comics #306 (March)
- Tattooed Man, in Green Lantern #23 (September)

=== Marvel Comics ===
- Ancient One – Strange Tales #110
- Angel – Uncanny X-Men #1 (Sept.)
- Avengers – Avengers #1 (Sept.)
- Awesome Android – Fantastic Four #15 (June)
- Baron Mordo – Strange Tales #111 (Aug.)
- Beast – Uncanny X-Men #1 (Sept.)
- Chameleon – The Amazing Spider-Man #1 (Mar.)
- Cobra – Journey into Mystery #98 (Nov.)
- Crimson Dynamo – Tales of Suspense #46 (Oct.)
- Cyclops – Uncanny X-Men #1 (Sept.)
- Doctor Octopus – The Amazing Spider-Man #3 (July)
- Doctor Strange – Strange Tales #110 (July)
- Eel in Strange Tales #112 (Sept.)
- Nick Fury – Sgt. Fury and his Howling Commandos #1 (May)
- Giant-Man – Tales to Astonish #49 (Nov.)
- Happy Hogan – Tales of Suspense #45 (Sept.)
- Hate-Monger – Fantastic Four #21 (Dec.)
- Iceman – Uncanny X-Men #1 (Sept.)
- Impossible Man – Fantastic Four #11 (Feb.)
- Iron Man – Tales of Suspense #39 (Mar.)
- Jack Frost (later Blizzard) – Tales of Suspense #45 (Sept.)
- John Jameson – Amazing Spider-Man #1 (July)
- J. Jonah Jameson – Amazing Spider-Man #1 (July)
- Kala – Tales of Suspense #43 (July)
- Lava Men – Journey into Mystery #97 (Oct.)
- Lizard – The Amazing Spider-Man #6 (Nov.)
- Willie Lumpkin – Fantastic Four #11 (Feb.)
- Mad Thinker – Fantastic Four #15 (June)
- Magneto – Uncanny X-Men #1 (Sept.)
- Marvel Girl – Uncanny X-Men #1 (Sept.)
- Melter – Tales of Suspense #47 (Nov.)
- Metal Master – The Incredible Hulk #6 (Mar.)
- Mister Doll – Tales of Suspense #48 (Dec.)
- Mister Hyde – Journey into Mystery #99 (Dec.)
- Molecule Man – Fantastic Four #20 (Nov.)
- Nightmare – Strange Tales #110
- Paste Pot Pete (later Trapster) – Strange Tales #104
- Pepper Potts – Tales of Suspense #45 (Sept.)
- Plantman – Strange Tales #113 (Oct.)
- Porcupine – Tales to Astonish #48 (Oct.)
- Radioactive Man – Journey into Mystery #93 (June)
- Pharaoh Rama-Tut (later Kang the Conqueror) – Fantastic Four #19 (Oct.)
- Red Ghost – Fantastic Four #13 (Apr.)
- Sandman – The Amazing Spider-Man #4 (Sept.)
- Space Phantom – Avengers #2 (Nov.)
- Super-Skrull in Fantastic Four #18 (Sept.)
- Surtur – Journey into Mystery #97 (Oct.)
- Tyrannus – The Incredible Hulk #5 (Jan.)
- Uatu (The Watcher) – Fantastic Four #13 (Apr.)
- Vanisher – Uncanny X-Men #2 (Nov.)
- The Voice – Tales to Astonish #42 (Apr.)
- Vulture – Amazing Spider-Man #2 (May)
- Wasp – Tales to Astonish #44 (June)
- Wong-Chu – Tales of Suspense #39 (Mar.)
- Human Top (later Whirlwind) – Tales to Astonish #50 (Dec.)
- Professor X – Uncanny X-Men #1 (Sept.)
- X-Men – Uncanny X-Men #1 (Sept.)
- Ho Yinsen – Tales of Suspense #39 (Mar.)

=== Independent publishers ===
- Dogmatix, by Goscinny and Uderzo, in Asterix and the banquet.
- Eva Kant, Diabolik’s lover and partner, by the Giussani sisters, in Diabolik arrested (March).
- Madam Mim – Disney (June)
- Hellingen, mad scientist and Zagor's antagonist, by Guido Nolitta and Gallieno Ferri, in On the Titan's footprints (August)
- Blueberry, by Charlier and Giraud, in Fort Navajo (October)
