= Re di Picche =

Character in an Italian comic series

- Cover of the third issue, August 1969.
- Genre: Humor/comedy

Creative team
- Created by: Luciano Bottaro

Re di Picche (i.e. "King of Spades") is the title character of an Italian comic series created by Luciano Bottaro.

== History and profile ==
Re di Picche debuted in 1969, as the leading character of a short-lived comics magazine with the same name, published in Italy by A.G.I.S.

Inspired by the traditional characters of the playing cards, it features the humorous adventures of a quick-tempered tyrant obsessed by his expansionist ambitions towards the bordering reign led by the placid Re di Cuori ("King of Hearts"). The magazine also included other characters by Bottaro, Carlo Chendi, Giorgio Rebuffi and Franco Aloisi, such as Pon Pon, Giò Polpetta, Romeo Lancia. The magazine was also published in France with the title Roi de Pique.

After the magazine closed, Bottaro continued to create new stories of Re di Picche until mid-1980s for a number of other publications, including the magazines Corriere dei Ragazzi and Corriere dei Piccoli and the newspaper Il Secolo XIX.
