= Serafino (comics) =

Italian cartoon character and comic book series

- Serafino (comics) character
- First appearance: Cucciolo (1948)
- Created by: Egidio Gherlizza

In-universe information
- Gender: Male
- Nationality: Italian

Serafino is the title character of an Italian comic series created by Egidio Gherlizza.

The character originally debuted in 1948 as a kangaroo, but was redesigned as a more canine looking character in 1952. The comics series was originally published in the comics magazine Cucciolo, as a filler intended for the younger readers. It also named a short-lived eponym comic book series, published in Italy by Edizioni Alpe.

The comics feature an unlucky and always hungry tramp, initially portrayed as kangaroo and that over the years assumed more human appearances.
