= Whisky & Gogo =

Italian comic series

- Genre: Humor/comedy

Creative team
- Created by: Luciano Bottaro

Whisky & Gogo is an Italian comic series created by Luciano Bottaro.

It debuted in 1959, published in the comics magazine Cucciolo, and in a short time it named an eponym comic book series, published in Italy by Edizioni Alpe. The series, set in the American Old West, features a brown bear with the vice of drinking (Whisky) and an innocuous, easygoing trapper (Gogo).
