= Akim (comics) =

Publication information
- Publisher: Edizioni Tomasina

Akim is the title character of an Italian adventure comic series created by writer Roberto Renzi and illustrator Augusto Pedrazza.

A Tarzanesque comic book series, it was published by Tomasina from 1950 to 1967. It was also successfully exported in Germany, Greece (where it was renamed Tarzan) and in France, where Renzi and Pedrazza kept to produce new stories even after the series closed in Italy. The series was also successful in Brazil where 198 issues were published between 1971 and 1991. The series was later reprised in Italy in 1976 by publishers Altamira (currently Sergio Bonelli Editore) and Quadrifoglio until 1983, when it finally closed.
