= Spara och Slösa =

- Illustrator: Birgitta Lilliehöök
- Current status/schedule: Terminated.
- Launch date: 1926
- End date: 1963
- Publisher: Lyckoslanten
- Genre(s): Educational comics, Text comics

Spara och Slösa was a Swedish comic strip series created by Birgitta Lilliehöök, and published between the years of 1926–1963 for the Swedish bank concern Sparbanken's children's magazine Lyckoslanten. Today the comic, which has become well known for the generation growing up in mid-20th century Sweden, is illustrated by Lena Forsman.

The main characters are two girls, where Slösa ("Waste") always throws away her money on entertainment and consumption while Spara ("Save") saves her money. The comics were intended to educate children on how to spend money properly.
