= Lyckoslanten =

Children's magazine in Sweden

- Categories: Children's magazine
- Frequency: Quarterly
- Publisher: Vi Media AB
- Founder: Sparbankerna
- Founded: 1926; 99 years ago
- Country: Sweden
- Based in: Stockholm
- Language: Swedish
- Website: Lyckoslanten

Lyckoslanten (Swedish: Lucky Penny) is a free quarterly children's magazine based in Stockholm, Sweden. It has been in circulation since 1926.

== History and profile ==
Lyckoslanten was started by Sparbankerna (Savings Banks Association) in 1926. Its first issue appeared on 30 October 1926. The magazine is owned by Swedbank and Sparbankerna. It was formerly distributed by Postsparbanken. It is published by Vi Media AB on a quarterly basis. Its headquarters is in Stockholm. One of its early directors was Erik Elinder who served in the post until 1950.

Lyckoslanten is a free magazine and is sent to Swedish school children attending the grades of 4–6. The goal of the magazine is to improve children's inclination to thrift and their financial literacy skills. It also encourages children to think about how they use their allowance. It covers funny comics, competitions and tips. The magazine has published several comic strip series, including Spara och Slösa. It was featured in the magazine from its start in 1926 to 1963 as part of the savings campaigns.

In 1957 Lyckoslanten enjoyed the highest level of circulation.
