= Roberto Renzi =

Italian cartoonist (1923–2018)

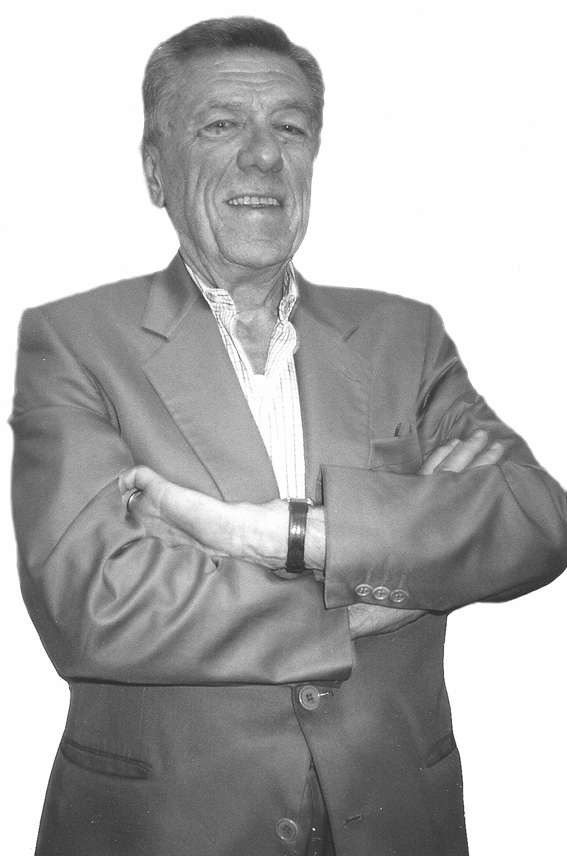
- Renzi in 1992
- Born: 10 February 1923; Cadorago, Italy
- Died: 23 October 2018 (aged 95); Milan, Italy
- Occupation: Cartoonist

Roberto Renzi (10 February 1923 – 23 October 2018) was an Italian cartoonist.

== Biography ==
Renzi began writing comics in 1942 during World War II. He created titles such as Il principe nero, Scugnizzo, Il piccolo corsaro, Zan della jungla, Coyote, and Birba. In the post-war era, he created famous fictional characters such as Tiramolla and Akim. He also wrote nine stories for The Walt Disney Company Italy.

Outside of his comic book work, Renzi was an active journalist, and wrote a book titled Racconti mattinali (Morning stories).

He founded the Fondazione Silvio Fossati in 2007, a foundation celebrating comic book work in Italy. He also directed the Press Club in Milan.

== Works ==
- Akim
- Tiramolla
- Bengali
- Zarawa
- Fulgor
- Tiramolla Elastoc
- Joe Canyon
- Il Piccolo Caporale
