= Marc Daniëls =

American comic artist (1959–2021)

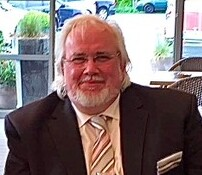
- Born: 10 July 1959 Jette, Brussels, Belgium
- Died: 10 May 2021 (aged 61) Jette, Brussels, Belgium

Marc Daniëls (10 July 1959 – 10 May 2021), also known as De Marck, was a Belgian comics writer, artist and painter. He ran Studio Max together with Rik De Wulf between 1999 and 2010.

== Biography ==
Daniëls studied Visual Arts at the Royal Atheneum Brussels in Jette. He drew illustrations and cartoons for Brussels newspapers.

In 1999, he founded Studio Max! alongside De Wulf. They came up with the comic strip Stam en Pilou for the youth philately of the Belgian Post, which was released in album form in 2000. In 2010, the 25th album in the series was released. In the same year, the studio was closed. In 2011, this comic series got a comic strip wall in Brussels on Rue des Alexiens/Cellebroersstraat.

In 2009, he made the album Alexander the Great 1 in Jacques Martin's educational series The Travels of Alex, together with De Wulf, among others. In 2011, Daniëls drew a seven-part comic series on a script by Danny Verbiest about the Brussels painter and art dealer Geert Van Bruaene (1891-1964).

Daniëls died at the age of 61 from the effects of COVID-19.
