= Pon Pon =

Italian comic strip

- Genre: Humor/comedy

Creative team
- Created by: Luciano Bottaro

Pon Pon is the title character of an Italian comic strip created by Luciano Bottaro.

== Background ==
Pon Pon was created by Bottaro in 1955 as Sor Funghetto and was published until 1970 in the children magazine Lo Scolaro. In 1967 it was renamed "Pon Pon" and in 1969 new stories of Pon Pon were published in Re di Picche. From November 1971 to August 1994 the comic strip was regularly published in the weekly magazine Il Giornalino. In 1999 a whole anthology devoted to the character, Pon Pon Annual, was released. In 2000 it resurfaced in the magazine G Baby. The comics is set in a peaceful and serene country village, populated by anthropomorphic mushrooms, each with a different personality, in which the difficulties and dangers are caused not by enemies easily identifiable but by the same flaws of the characters, which represent those of society.
