= Pugacioff =

Publication information
- Publisher: Edizioni Alpe
- Genre: Humor/comedy

Creative team
- Created by: Giorgio Rebuffi

Pugacioff (also spelled Pugaciòff) is the title character of an Italian comic series created by Giorgio Rebuffi.

== Background ==
Pugacioff was created by Rebuffi in 1959 as a supporting character in the comic series Cucciolo, then he became protagonist of independent stories, published in various comics magazine of the publisher Edizioni Alpe. An always-hungry anthropomorphic wolf who constantly devises plans to catch and eat the villain Bombarda and his henchman Salsiccia, Pugacioff became, between 1963 and 1969, the title character of the comic book series Le avventure di Pugacioff. Pugacioff was also a recurring character in Tore Scoccia, a comic strip series about a galactic traveling salesman created in the late 1960s by Carlo Chendi and by the same Rebuffi.
