= Lo Scolaro =

Defunct weekly children's magazine in Italy (1912–1972)

- Categories: Children magazine
- Frequency: Weekly
- Founder: G. B. Barletta
- Founded: 1912
- Final issue: May 1972
- Country: Italy
- Based in: Genoa
- Language: Italian

Lo Scolaro ("The Schoolboy") was a weekly magazine dedicated to school children and published from 1912 to 1972. The magazine was headquartered in Genoa, Italy.

== History and profile ==
The magazine was founded by G. B. Barletta and started its publications with the name Facciamo gli Italiani ("Let's do the Italians"), changing its name in Lo Scolaro in 1915. It came out weekly during the school year, and fortnightly/monthly during the summer. It was distributed on newsstands and in over three thousand schools. The magazine alternated topical headings and curiosity columns, short stories and serials, games, articles on school or teaching topics and comics. Some important Italian cartoonists collaborated to the magazine, including Luciano Bottaro (who here introduced the Pon Pon character), Franco Aloisi, Giovan Battista Carpi, Giulio Chierchini, Paolo Piffarerio, Gallieno Ferri, Guido Zamperoni. In addition to humorous and adventurous comics, in deference to the educational function of the magazine, there were published numerous comics which adapted famous novels, biographies and historical events.

Given to a sales crisis, in January 1970 the magazine changed name to Lo Scolaro D'Europa ("The Schoolboy of Europe") and started mainly publishing previously published material, but the new course was short lived and the magazine finally closed in May 1972 after a sixty-year history and more than 1,000 issues published.

== See also ==
- List of magazines published in Italy
