= Trottolino =

Comics character

Publication information
- Genre: humor, adventure
- Publication date: 1952-1990
- No. of issues: 425

Trottolino is the title character of an Italian humorous comics magazine.

== Background ==
Trottolino was created in 1952 by Giorgio Rebuffi under the pen name "O'Layne" and was the title character of a comics magazine published between 1952 and 1990. It was the first comics magazine published by Renato Bianconi, a former collaborator of publisher Alpe; released without any marketing hype, it got an immediate commercial success and launched the career of Bianconi as a publisher.

The comics magazine, similar in its digest-sized format to Topolino, featured the adventures of an anthropomorphic squirrel. His sidekick in many stories was the anthropomorphic duck Papy Papero, a character created by Luciano Bottaro who was also the leading character of independent stories and later of a western-themed spin-off comic book series, Papys Bill. The magazine also included comics featuring different characters created by the same Rebuffi, Nicola Del Principe (who later also cured, for several decades, the stories of Trottolino), Giovan Battista Carpi, Luciano Gatto, Tiberio Colantuoni. From 1982 until the end of publications, it stopped the release of original comics and just republished old stories.

Several spin-off magazines were published, notably between 1959 and 1978 Super Trottolino and between 1980 and 1983 Gran Trottolino; they substantially were collections of old stories already published in the main publication.
