= Pepito (comics) =

Comic character

- Genre: Humor/comedy

Creative team
- Created by: Luciano Bottaro

Pepito is the title character of an Italian comic series created by Luciano Bottaro.

== History ==
Pepito debuted in 1951, first published in the comics magazines Gaie Fantasie and Cucciolo; from 1955, Pepito became the leading character of an eponymous comic book series, published in Italy by Edizioni Bianconi. While the success in Italy was limited, and there the comic book lasted just two years, the comics had a significant international success, especially in France (where it was published for 27 years) and, less remarkably, in Germany, Greece and South America.

== Plot and characters ==
Pepito is a young pirate with a puffy face wearing a large hat with a skull. He is fighting against the evil Governor of the island of Las Ananas Hernandez Banana (or Hernandez de la Banana, sometimes called "His Ventripotence" or "The Mortadella with Legs" because of his waist), who is assisted by the diabolical inventor Scartoff. Aboard his ship the Peanut, Pepito is assisted in this task by his sidekick Crochette, and by his junior buccaneer comrades that include talkative parrot Bec-de-Fer and monkey Parakeet/Pancrace.
