= Edizioni Alpe =

The original logo of Edizioni Alpe as it appeared in 1943 on the series Gli Albi della Fantasia. The background colour of the circle varied and also appeared as blue or red.

Edizioni Alpe (also known for a time in the late 1940s as Edizioni Subalpino) was an Italian publishing house founded in 1939 and active until the late 1980s. Based in Milan, it published a series of magazines focusing on popular fiction genres—romance, science fiction, mystery—and the genre for which it was best known, comics.

== History ==
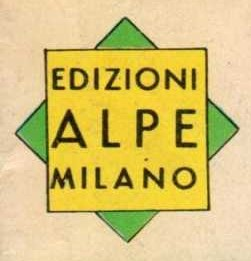
The Edizioni Alpe logo in 1963

The company was founded in 1939 by the journalist and writer Giuseppe Antonio Caregaro. One of its earliest and most successful comics was the Cucciolo series created by Caregaro and drawn by Rino Anzi. Although Alpe primarily concentrated on comics, it also published popular fiction magazines after Caregaro took over Edizioni Economiche Italiane and its back catalogue in 1940. Alpe became a limited liability company in 1944 with Caregaro as its managing director, but much of the editorial supervision and administration was carried out by the writer Leonello Martini. Carlo Chendi, who worked for Edizioni Alpe in the early 1950s, recalled that the postwar years were difficult ones for Alpe and other Italian comics publishers. The distribution system was hampered by an inadequate transport network in Italy and there was a chronic shortage of paper.

The editorial offices were originally located in a single basement room on Via Carlo Poma in Milan. With the success of Cucciolo, which by the early 1950s was selling almost as well as Mondadori's Topolino, the company was on a more secure financial footing and was able to move into a four-room apartment in nearby Via Piolti de' Bianchi. Caregaro rented out one of the rooms to Giorgio Rebuffi who used it as his studio for several years. By that time Rebuffi had become the primary artist for the Cucciolo series and for Tiramolla, which was to become Alpe's longest-running comic. After Caregaro's death in 1963, his son inherited the company but showed little interest in running it. Martini took over as its managing director followed in 1976 by Teresa Comelli who had been a secretary and administrator with the company since its early postwar years. However, the innovation and experimentation which had marked the company's output during Caregaro's lifetime gradually diminished. Alpe became increasingly dependent on republishing earlier comics and eventually ceased operating in the late 1980s.

== Edizioni Alpe comics, writers and artists ==
Comics

- Baldo
- Cucciolo
- Pugacioff
- Serafino
- Tiramolla
- Whisky & Gogo

Writers and artists

- Renzo Barbieri
- Luciano Bottaro
- Andrea Bresciani
- Alfredo Castelli
- Carlo Chendi
- Alberico Motta
- Giorgio Rebuffi
