= Carlo Chendi =

Italian cartoonist (1933–2021)

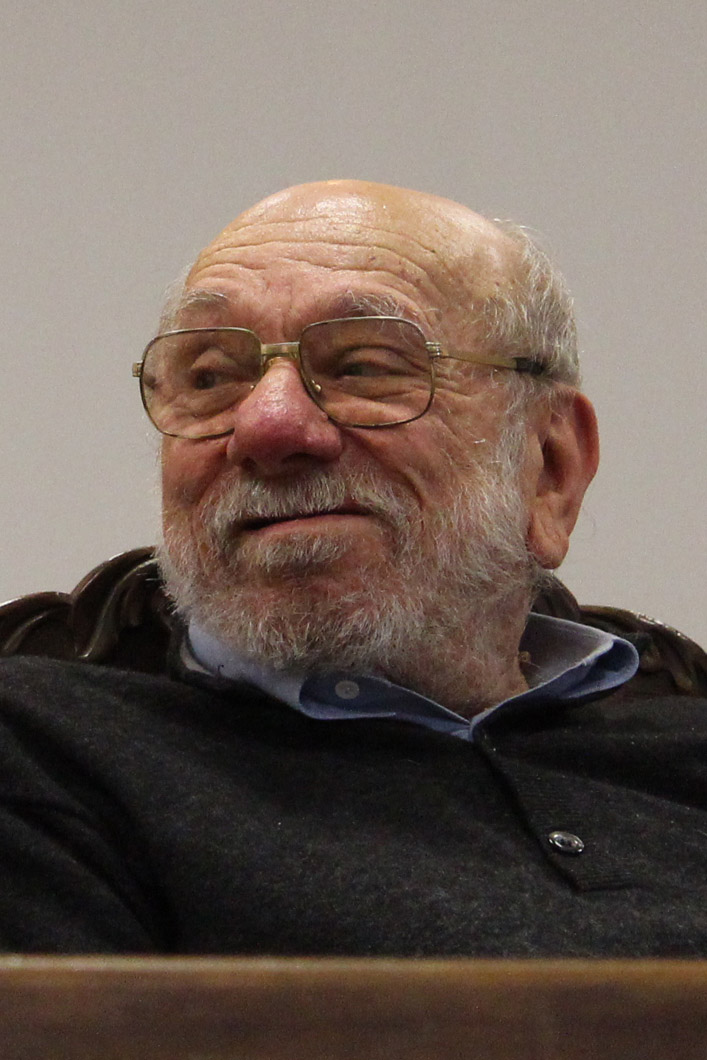
- Chendi in 2013
- Born: Angelo Carlo Chendi; 10 July 1933 Ferrara, Italy
- Died: 12 September 2021 (aged 88)
- Area: Writer
- Notable works: Italian Disney comics International Cartoonists Exhibition
- Awards: Full list

Angelo Carlo Chendi (10 July 1933 – 12 September 2021) was an Italian cartoonist.

From 1952, Carlo Chendi wrote hundreds of stories with characters from Disney comics.

== Biography ==
Having moved at a young age from Province of Ferrara to Rapallo, Liguria, he began his activity as a cartoonist here, becoming one of the pillars of the so-called Rapallo School, together with the master Luciano Bottaro and his friend Giorgio Rebuffi, with whom he founded in 1968 the Bierrecì group (an acronym for Bottaro, Rebuffi, Chendi) without, however, ceasing to collaborate with Arnoldo Mondadori Editore in the creation of Disney stories.

In the 1960s with Bottaro he started the great saga of Rebo, the Tyrant of Saturn: humorous narratives featuring the well-known character Rebo (comics) together with Disney characters.

In the course of his career, which took place between the Tigullio area and Milan, he participated, among other things, in the creation of the magazine King of Spades, the first of Studio Bierrecì, and in the creation of the Italy tradition of Disney's Great Parodies: in this series one of his most illustrious and appreciated works, created in collaboration with Luciano Bottaro, is Doctor Duckus.

A great pen pal of Carl Barks, he brought him to Italy during the 1994 European tour, and dedicated to him the XXXIII edition of the International Cartoonists Exhibition, which he has curated, along with a staff of other scriptwriters, cartoonists, experts and fans, since 1972.

He died on September 12, 2021, at the age of 88.

In December 2021, Panini Comics reissued his "Paperingio Cycle" in a clothbound volume, publishing one of his last writings as a posthumous preface.

== Early life ==
Chendi moved at a young age from Ferrara, to Rapallo, in Liguria, where he started his career as a cartoonist.

== Career ==
Chendi became one of the pillars of the so-called school of Rapallo, along with Maestro Luciano Bottaro and his friend Giorgio Rebuffi, with whom he founded in 1968 the group Bierrecì (acronym of Bottaro, Rebuffi, Chendi) without, however, stop working with the Mondadori in the realization of Disney stories. Along with Bottaro and Rebuffi he spearheaded the creation of the International Cartoonists Exhibition in 1972.

His career took place between the area of Tigullio and Milan, where he participated in, among other things, the creation of the magazine King of Spades, the first of Studio Bierrecì, and the implementation of traditional Italian of Great Disney Feature; his series was one of his most famous and appreciated, in collaboration with Luciano Bottaro.

Important Disney inventions include extraterrestrial duck O.K. Quack and detective Umperio Bogarto (both designed by Giorgio Cavazzano), the secret identity of Donald Duck "agent QQ7" (the story Mission Bob Fingher had acclaim Disney Americana), and the duet between Pippo and Witch Hazel.

With Bottaro, he began the great saga of Rebo, the tyrant of Saturn.

== Awards ==
- 1994 Cover Silver, Walt Disney Company
- 1996 Yellow Kid Award as Best Author
- 2001 U Giancu's Prize for Best Writer
- 2010 Prix Papersera Award
