= Luciano Bottaro =

Italian comic book artist

- Born: 16 November 1931 Rapallo, Kingdom of Italy
- Died: 25 November 2006 (aged 75) Rapallo, Italy
- Awards: U Giancu's Prize, 1995

Luciano Bottaro (16 November 1931 – 25 November 2006) was an Italian comic book artist.

He was influenced by Otto Messmer's Felix the Cat, Winsor McCay's Little Nemo in Slumberland, Frederick Burr Opper's Happy Hooligan, Rudolph Dirks's the Katzenjammer Kids, and Barks and Gottfredson's Disney adaptations.

== Biography ==
Born in Rapallo, he abandoned his accounting studies for cartooning in 1949. That year, he began his career for Lo Scolaro, an Italian magazine, with the character Aroldo il bucaniere.

He worked for La Domenica del Corriere, Edizioni Alpe and Mondadori, the Italian Disney comics publisher: his first story was "Paperino e le onorificenze" written by Alberto Testa and published in 1952.

In the same year he began to collaborate with Guido Scala and Franco Aloisi. They were subsequently joined by Carlo Chendi. Unofficially they were called "Rapallo's School", before the birth of the "Bierrecì Studios".

== Bierrecì Studios ==
Besides his work on Disney's characters, he worked on other magazines, creating a lot of characters (Whisky & Gogo, Baldo, Pon Pon, Giò Polpetta, Maramao), and in 1958 he founded the Bierrecì Studios with Carlo Chendi and Giorgio Rebuffi.

The first Bierreci Studios' publication was Re di Picche, a comic book that published the adventures of the king of the cards, a pitiless and blood-thirsty parody of military world, inspired by Alice's Adventures in Wonderland.

One of his most popular characters was Pepito, the comical adventures of a 17th-century buccaneer who fights, among others, the greedy, grasping but essentially lovable Governor of a Spanish Caribbean colony. Published in various countries in magazines that ranged from monthly to fortnightly, Pepito proved surprisingly more popular outside of Italy than in its country of origin.

Several cartoonists began working with them, including Maria Luisa Uggetti, Tiberio Colantuoni, Ivo Milazzo, Giancarlo Berardi. They worked on several characters, including Mickey Mouse, Uncle Scrooge, Warner Bros. characters.

They also produced the comics version of Carosello, an Italian television program that, during the 1950s and 1960s, played the first Italian advertisements.

== Reprints ==
Fantagraphics has since 2018 reprinted some of Bottaro's Disney comics in volumes of the Disney Masters hardcover series.

- Donald Duck: Uncle Scrooge's Money Rocket (2018) ISBN 978-1-68396-109-3
- Donald Duck: Jumpin' Jupiter! (2021) ISBN 978-1-68396-414-8
