= Tiramolla =

Italian superhero comic series

Publication information
- First appearance: Cucciolo (August 8, 1952)
- Created by: Roberto Renzi, Giorgio Rebuffi

Tiramolla is an Italian comic book character created in 1952 by Roberto Renzi and Giorgio Rebuffi.

Tiramolla (English: Stretch-Spring) is a superhero that resembles a stick figure with an extensible body, long legs, a cylindrical head and a bow. As a result of falling into a large container of rubber, Tiramolla gained the ability to stretch as he wishes, even for several kilometers.

He appeared for the first time in August 1952 as a supporting character in the comic series Cucciolo e Beppe, in the magazine Cucciolo, in the story "Il mistero della villa" (trad. "Mystery of the Villa"). The first cartoonist was Giorgio Rebuffi.

On 15 July 1953, Tiramolla became the star of an independent magazine of the same name, published by Edizioni Alpe. Umberto Manfrin joined Rebuffi in the role of writer, and later also became cartoonist with the pseudonym of Manberto. New characters were introduced: the butler Saetta, Ullaò the dog, the "Admiral", Caucciù, the Tiramolla's grandson in possession of the same powers of his uncle, the villain Mister Magic and other characters of satirical inspiration such as the accountant Rossi (that symbolize the Italian pedantic) and the Devil's Advocate (inspired by Perry Mason).

At the regular series there were flanked almanacs, collections and reprints in an intense schedule of weekly, monthly and quarterly releases.

At the end of 1980s, after the editor Giuseppe Caregaro's death, Tiramolla ended its publications. On 31 August 1990 the Vallardi relaunched ran for 137 issues: it began as a weekly and later switched to a monthly schedule, but the magazine failed to regain the previous success and finally closed in the middle of 1993.

Also in 1992 Dan Videos produced Tiramolla Adventures, an animated series directed by Giuseppe Laganà.
