= Cucciolo & Beppe =

Italian comic book character

- Cucciolo / Tiramolla characters
- The two main protagonists, Cucciolo (left), and Beppe (right)
- First appearance: Gil Albi del Scimmiottino (1940)
- Last appearance: Cucciolo (1986)
- Created by: Giuseppe Caregaro (Writer); Rino Anzi (Artist)
- Designed by: Rino Anzi; Giorgio Rebuffi
- Inspired by: Disney Comics

In-universe information
- Species: Anthropomorphic Dogs (Rino Anzi, 1940 – 1948); Humans (Giorgio Rebuffi, 1949 – 1986)
- Gender: Male
- Occupation: Various
- Nationality: Italian

Cucciolo and Beppe are Italian cartoon characters created by writer Giuseppe Caregaro and artist Rino Anzi in 1940 and later by Giorgio Rebuffi. They are one of the most recognizable characters created by the author. They are the title characters of an Italian long-lasting comic book series of the same name. Cucciolo, together with the inseparable friend Beppe, are a couple of comic characters created in 1940 by Giuseppe Caregaro as writer and Rino Anzi as artist as an imitation of Disney characters Mickey Mouse and Goofy. They were originally drawn as two cute anthropomorphic animals, specifically Dogs, and were protagonists of humorous-adventure stories in which they face the bad Bombarda, an imitation of Pete. Their stories were originally published in the comic magazine Gli Albi Del Scimiottino and in a number of other magazines, then Cucciolo named an eponym comic magazine, published by Edizioni Alpe (later Edizioni Bianconi) from 1948 to 1986. Starting from post-war era in 1949, the cartoonist Giorgio Rebuffi revolutionized the comics, turning the two protagonists in two humans, giving them well-defined personalities and enhancing the satirical side of their stories. Several supporting characters, such as the superhero Tiramolla and the wolf Pugacioff, later became they themselves leading characters of successful spin-off series.

== History ==
=== Early years and pre-war period (1940 – 1943) ===
The characters made their debut graphically very similar to Mickey Mouse and Goofy in the Gli albi di Scimmiottino series published by Edizioni Alpe, in issue no. 76 of 4 September 1941 with the story "Cucciolo e la cappello miracolosa" , written by Federico Pedrocchi with the pseudonym of Antonio Carozzi and drawn by Rino Anzi, which was followed by other stories until the magazine was closed in December 1941 and replaced by the new magazine Gli Albi della Fantasia, a container series published from 1942 to 1943 and which alternated stories of Cucciolo by Federico Pedrocchi with other characters such as Coriolano by Walter Faccini and reductions of classic fairy tales or epic novels.

The two characters reappear in four more Scimmiottino comics , then, after the release of issue no. 84, Cucciolo e il bandito Musonero (13 December 1941), the publication changes from fortnightly to weekly and takes the name Gli Albi della Fantasia . Due to government regulations, speech bubbles and the division into vignettes are banned from children's periodicals and therefore the new series is distinguished from the previous one by the presence of captions instead of comic strips. In the ninth story featuring the two characters, Cucciolo al concorso inventori (No. 4 from February 15, 1942), they are radically transformed, no longer being drawn as humanized animals, graphically very similar to the Disney characters, Mickey Mouse and Goofy, but as people, without any explanation being provided in the plot, while maintaining the psychological and character traits and vaguely the physiognomy of the previous version; the clothing changes, now poorly patched.

The Cucciolo and Beppe couple appears from the first issue of the series ( Cucciolo e la stellina spenta , 15 January 1942) , which, like the previous one, also publishes reductions of classic fairy tales such as Puss in Boots , sixteenth century sagas such as The Paladins , humorous stories such as Bagolino Frottolini by Da Passano. In n. 32 of 1943 the first of 9 albums of Coriolano, trainer of the ape Pantaleo, appears. Written and drawn by Walter Faccini , it is the only other series of the series to survive after the war and to continue for years in Gaie Fantasie and Cucciolo , also illustrated by Giorgio Rebuffi, Luciano Bottaro, Antonio Terenghi

In the story " In the land of lookalikes" (n. 33, 1943) illustrated by Roberto Peroni , Cucciolo wears a floppy hat and, like Beppe, acquires the characteristic quiff; the two gradually begin to age, transforming from children into boys of an unspecified age. In the course of that story, the two discover a tribe of prehistoric men all identical to each other and with the identical name "Poldo", characters who return in three other issues (nn. 35, 48 and 52). The series - which like the previous one publishes various series alternately - ends with n. 64 of 1943.

=== Post-war (1948 – 1953) ===
In 1948 the stories of the characters return in three supplements of the series I Grandi Racconti Illustrati in which almost all the stories in which the two protagonists are still humanized animals are reprinted. The third supplement " Il Natale di Cucciolo" publishes an unpublished adventure, " Pranzo di fine anno ", signed - in the last vignette - by E. Raineri . At least two of the adventures as humanized animals, " Cucciolo e l'aeroterracqueo di Beppe" and " Cucciolo e le superstizioni di Beppe" are redrawn at the end of the fifties with the protagonists in human form with the titles " L'aeroterracqueo" and " Beppe super superstizioso" ; the author is probably Raffaele Cormio . In April 1949 a new series, " Gaie Fantasie ", was launched, which alternated the reprinting of pre-war material with unpublished material and which would later also be known as Fantasie Allegre and Le Gaie Fantasie di Cucciolo , consisting of monthly comics of 48 pages in large format. At the beginning the series reprinted stories from the series Gli Albi della Fantasia and Gli Albi di Scimmiottino , both of Cucciolo and of other characters such as Coriolano, and in 1952 it began to publish almost exclusively unpublished material and, with rare exceptions, the characters retained the appearance of boys from the last period of Gli Albi dell'Allegria ; clothing and certain facial details vary depending on the artist but Cucciolo is always characterised by the presence of the floppy hat that he wears until 1953. Rino Anzi, Lina Buffolente , Roberto Peroni, Egidio Gherlizza , Giuseppe Perego , Dario Guzzon contribute to the creation of their new adventures . Another anonymous illustrator created a version of Cucciolo in Disney style, with pie-shaped eyes. Among the cover artists we find the lesser known "Adry", also author of the story " I due leoni ", Franco Aloisi , Luciano Bottaro, Lina Buffolente, Carlo Gentina , Egidio Gherlizza, Dario Guzzon, Giuseppe Perego, E. Raineri.

=== The Golden age (1950s) ===
In 1950 the characters of Bombarda ( Cucciolo contro Bombarda , n. 18), the three nephews Tip, Top and Tap ( Cucciolo e Tip, Top e Tap , n. 20, drawings by Roberto Peroni) made their appearance. In the episode Caccia grossa ( Treasure Island and other stories , n. 27, 1951) Giorgio Rebuffi made his debut as an author while " Le istantanee di Beppe" ( n. 12, 1952, texts by Carlo Chendi ) is the debut of Luciano Bottaro while with " Cucciolo e Beppe parrucchieri provetti" ( n. 20, 1952) the production of Umberto Manfrin began ; " Negli abissi del Mar-Mellata" (no. 5, 1954, text by Cesare Solini ) and " Vacazioni in Africa" (no. 13, 1954) are respectively the first stories by Tiberio Colantuoni and Franco Aloisi. The plots were initially simple and childish and, throughout 1952, alternated with more elaborate ones created by Rebuffi, often based on texts by Roberto Renzi for the dedicated magazine Cucciolo in booklet format, in which Cucciolo and Beppe were portrayed as adults. The point of connection between the two versions of the characters is the album " La banda del filo " (no. 5, 1953) illustrated by Rebuffi, in which Tiramolla also appears . The publications continued until 1956, with 144 issues divided into three series in three different formats, numbered starting from 1 for each year and with numerous supplements including in 1953 "Cucciolo in 3D", the first Italian three-dimensional comic book , on the wave of the boom of three-dimensional comics published in the United States.

The popularity of the character was confirmed by the release of a comic book of the same name in "booklet" format, the same one adopted with great success in 1949 by Mondadori's Topolino. The editor Caregaro in fact believed it had a winning card to compete with that magazine, and in fact for some years Cucciolo was the main competitor of the Mondadori magazine. . The first release in "booklet" format was the comic book " La strenna di Cucciolo" , supplement to n.29 of "Gaie Fantasie" of 15 August 1951 with the story Al fuoco! by Giorgio Rebuffi; the first issue of the Cucciolo series came out on 1 January 1952. In this magazine, Rebuffi, who portrayed himself in the guise of the designer "Mister Alt", reinvented the pair of characters now completely freed from Disney graphic models. As adults, Cucciolo and Beppe became part of the working middle class (although their occupation is unclear), moving in an increasingly urbanized environment; what was initially called "The Village" gradually became a city, later briefly christened "Cucciolopoli". In the adventure "The 1st Congress" , the title character organized a large meeting between the protagonists of the stories published in that issue of the monthly magazine, Fox, Bingo Bongo , and Coriolano ; other side series, many of which were already familiar to readers of Gaie Fantasie , appeared in subsequent issues. Through short connections, Rebuffi linked the various stories in each issue with a common thread, with the aim of creating a unified world similar to the Disney universe. The author created numerous other "meta-comic" stories, in which the so-called "fourth wall" was eliminated and the protagonists of the story spoke directly to the reader or interacted with the reader's reality, for example by erasing their opponent's weapons with a drawing eraser. He also invented new and appreciated characters such as the jinx cousin Giona (1954), the elusive Fantasmak (1954), La Peppa (1956), the Cossack Ivan Ilià (1958), the "Luposki of the steppe" Pugacioff (1959); he gave a surname to Beppe ("Dei Bepponi", in the story " Il certificato" ), and refined the characteristics of already existing characters, such as Bombarda, introduced in the comic "Il Bar di Beppe" as a dishonest and violent innkeeper (Gaie Fantasie n. 16, 1952), then became a full-time criminal, and finally, thanks to Rebuffi, an almost-ex-scoundrel who in turn was the victim of the Pugacioff Wolf.

The most famous character created graphically by Rebuffi is Tiramolla , created by Roberto Renzi , who made his appearance in n. 8 (1952) in a story called Il mistero della villa ; the success of the character was such that on 16 July 1953 Alpe editions dedicated an album to him which bore his name with the same characteristics as "Cucciolo". From n. 14 of 1962 Cucciolo published on its cover the "Garanzia Morale" brand, an association of Italian publishers which ensured the absence of drawings and situations which were not suitable for the purpose of avoiding a threatened government pre-censorship similar to that of cinema.

=== The 1960s and decline ===
Giuseppe Caregaro ran the publishing house until his death in 1963, marking the beginning of Edizioni Alpe's decline. Authors like Bottaro and Rebuffi moved on to more lucrative and artistically satisfying work, and the production of new stories—created by Gino Esposito ("Gino Scott"), Mario Moletti, Alberico Motta , Attilio Ortolani ("Attor"), Michele Seccia, Maria Luisa Uggetti , and, above all, Sante Villani, aka Vilsa, and Carlo Signoroni, aka Willi's—failed to replicate the success of the golden age of the 1950s and 1960s.

Since the 1950s Cucciolo appeared in an endless series of reprints, special issues, collected in the most disparate formats. In the end, after ephemeral attempts at renewal, Cucciolo and all the other magazines of the Alpe publishing house closed in 1987 and the rights to the stories and characters were sold to the Fratelli Vallardi publishing house, which in 1990 attempted to relaunch the character as part of the Tiramolla magazine project , a weekly magazine graphically identical to Topolino , advertised with a large amount of publicity but characterised by stories of lower quality. In June 1993 its publication was interrupted; in October of the same year the Comic Art publishing house tried to re-propose it in monthly black and white issues, but the series closed after three issues due to copyright problems.

=== Reprints ===
Since the 1990s, the stories of Cucciolo and Tiramolla have been reprinted and revisited. In particular, Edizioni Annexia published eight volumes dedicated to the two characters between 2014 and 2015.

== In other Countries ==
=== France ===
They were renamed Moustic and Pato in Rino Anzi's humanized version, Ferdinando "Roberto Peroni" Corbella and various artists preceding Rebuffi appeared sporadically between 1949 and 1952 in appendices to " Sciuscia " and " Le Petit Sheriff " by PEI/Sagédition. The characters then moved to Lug but Sagédition secured Pepito , who was the protagonist of various series between 1954 and 1981. Many series from Edizioni Alpe continued to appear on its pages and in those of "Le petit Sheriff" and "Ranch Magazine". The most famous and long-lived magazine was however " Pipo ", published from September 1952 for 229 issues until November 1961 by Editions Lug , and it was the first humorous comic book in the characteristic "Petit Format" (pocket-sized). The Pipo - Concombre (Beppe) duo shared the comic book with Tiramolla ( Elastoc ) published since N. 4; with Fox (previously published by Sagè), with Serafino ("Seraphin"), with Topy/Cucciolino/Scimmiottino here called Makakos , with Nonno Bigio (previously published by Sagè), here called Papa Grìndecel and with realistic characters like Robin Hood ( Robin des bois ). Many of the first covers are the work of the popular author Jean Cézard . In December 1961 Pipo merged with Pim Pam Poum , in the new title Pim Pam Poum Pipo which also published Bibì and Bibò . The series ended with n. 132 of November 1972 . Two other series were dedicated to the Alpe characters: Mini Pipo and Maxi Pipo , for which Jean-Yves Mitton , known for his excellent version of the Grande Blek , created the characters of Popoff, Pugacioff's cousin and the little wolf Troika. The relationship between Alpe and Lug was very close; through the aforementioned Lionello Martini and the agent Arnalda Maffi many Italian authors began to collaborate directly with the transalpine market. In 1976 Edizioni Alpe directly produced the monthly magazine Elastoc ( Tiramolla ) for the French market , but the initiative was not successful and was interrupted after 12 issues published in two formats (from n. 1 to n. 7 15x22 cm, then paperback).

=== Germany ===
Between 1954 and 1956, Cucciolo appeared in 38 comic books based on Gaie Fantasie and published by Alfons Sermau Verlag. The character was renamed Der Lustige Augustin ("The Funny Augustin"); the title echoes that of a popular Viennese song, Ach, du lieber Augustin ("Oh, my dear Augustin"), and Augusto is a comical name par excellence in Germany as it refers to the clown as opposed to the White Clown. During the same period (1954-1957), stories of Cucciolo and the other Alpe characters were published without fixed periodicity in "Der Fidele Cowboy" ("The Merry Cowboy"), also published by Sermau for 75 issues. The comic book initially published humorous stories featuring cowboys, then broadened its scope to include generic comic series from various sources. Between numbers 19 and 75, the image and name of Perego's "Buffalo Brill" appeared in the masthead.

=== Greece ===
Oi Pepo and Karo, "Pepo and Carlo" or Cucciolo and Beppe in the Greek edition, were the protagonists, along with other characters from the Italian magazines Cucciolo and Tiramolla, of the container comic book Τιραμόλα ("Tiramola"), published by the publishing house Kabanas starting in 1970 and continuing for approximately 1000 issues. The term "Tiramola" entered the Greek lexicon with a very different meaning from the Italian one ("Irresolute and inconclusive person"), even today it refers to someone capable of juggling and absorbing blows as if they were made of rubber, like the footballer Nikos Vamvakoulas , thus nicknamed. Another Alpe character, Σεραφίνο ("Seraph"), achieved considerable success and was dedicated a comic book in 1969 and was published for a thousand issues, many of which were drawn locally by Isaak Moskidi.
