= Giorgio Rebuffi =

Italian comics artist (1928–2014)

Giorgio Rebuffi (7 November 1928 – 15 October 2014) was an Italian comics artist.

Born in Milan, Rebuffi started his career in 1949 when, still being a university student at the Faculty of Medicine, he created the character Sceriffo Fox ("Sheriff Fox") for the publisher Edizioni Alpe. Shortly after the publisher placed him in charge to cure the stories of Cucciolo and Beppe, two characters he revolutionised, changing their appearance, giving them well-defined personalities and enhancing the satirical side of their stories.

In 1952, he created his best known character, the bizarre superhero Tiramolla, characterized by the ability of being able to stretch as he wishes. Other well-known characters by Rebuffi include the squirrel Trottolino (created in 1952) and the wolf Pugacioff (created in 1959). Rebuffi was also active as a Disney cartoonist for the Mondadori publications.
