= 1999 in comics =

Notable events of 1999 in comics.

== Events and publications ==
- Rough Cut Comics founded
- WildStorm founded the America's Best Comics imprint
- Kitchen Sink Press collapses
- The Sandman: The Dream Hunters, novel tangential to The Sandman series, written by Neil Gaiman and illustrated by Yoshitaka Amano (Vertigo).
- In The Forward, The Jew of New York by Ben Katchor is serialized.
- In The Guardian, Gemma Bovery, by Posy Simmonds, is serialized.
- La settima congrega (The seventh congregation) by Elena de Grimani, self-published; debut of Rigel.
- In the Korean magazine Monthly Junior Champ, debut of the series Threads of Time, by Mi-young Noh.
- In Canada, Louis Riel by Chester Brown (Drawn & Quarterly)
- The final episode of Angus McGill and Dominic Poelsma's Clive is published.

=== January ===
- January 12: in Topolino 2250, Topolino e la pietra di Sbilenque (The Silenque stone) by Giorgio Pezzin and Massimo De Vita, first episode of Tops Stories. The series, set in the Thirties, tells the adventures, in Indiana Jones style, of Top de Tops, an English uncle of Mickey Mouse.
- January 13: Destiny free, by Dan Brereton and Joe Bennet, first episode of the Buffy's trilogy The origin.
- January 26: Belgian comic artist Marc Sleen is knighted by Albert II of Belgium.
- January 22: in the Dutch magazine Donald Duck, Pawns of the loup garou by Daan Jippes and Carl Barks; the Barks’ script had been already published in 1967, with Tony Strobl’s drawings.
- January 29: Dutch cartoonist Stefan Verwey wins the Inktspotprijs for Best Political Cartoon. He won the award the year before too.
- DC Comics completes the takeover of WildStorm.
- Batman: No Man's Land storyline begins.
- First issue of Birds of prey (DC Comics)
- Aliens: Apocalypse - The Destroying Angels by Mark Schultz and Doug Wheatley (Dark Horse Comics)
- Top secret by William Vance and Jean Van Hamme.

=== February ===
- February 3: Dominique Bussereau hosts an official debate in Paris to determine whether the comic strip The Adventures of Tintin by Hergé was right-wing or left-wing? The debaters are unable to reach a determined conclusion.
- February 2: In Topolino, Il grande splash by Silvia Ziche begins. It's a parodic detective story in 14 episodes, where the characters of the Duck universe must discover the thief of Uncle Scrooge’s patrimony.
- ...et mourir by Jean Van Hamme and Philippe Francq, 10th episode of the series Largo Winch.

=== March ===
- March 4: in the Danish magazine Anders and co., The Dutchman's Secret by Don Rosa.
- March 17: Dark Horse Presents n. 141: special issue entirely dedicated to the Buffy Comics.
- The Incredible Hulk (1968 series) is canceled by Marvel with issue #474.
- Empire dramas, first album of the series The League of Extraordinary Gentlemen, by Alan Moore and Kevin O’Neill (WildStorm).
- First issue of the parodic series Vext, by Keith Giffen and Mike McKone, with the god of misfortune as protagonist (DC Comics). It's suspended after just six issues for insufficient sales.
- Batman beyond, by Hilary J. Bader and Rick Burchett, comics version of the animated series.
- First issue of the limited series The Trenchcoat Brigade, by John Ney Rieber and John Ridgway (Vertigo Comics) and Earth X, by Jim Krueger and John Paul Leon (Marvel Comics).
- In America's Best Comics preview (WildStorm), Tom Strong, by Alan Moore and Chris Sprouse, makes his debut.

=== April ===
- April 4: The Dutch comics magazine Sjosji Striparazzi which changed its name into Striparazzi, publishes its final issue, marking the end of a long history under many different names.
- April 14: The Belgian comics magazine Spirou (Robbedoes in Dutch) brings out a special issue: all the pages of issue #3183 are illustrated by one and the same artist: Philippe Bercovici.
- The Boondocks by Aaron McGruder makes its debut In Los Angeles Times; previously, the strip had appeared only on amatorial magazines.
- The Final Cut by Andi Watson and Cliff Richards (Dark Horse Comics)
- L’isola misteriosa by Federico Memola and Teresa Marzia; debut of Jonathan Steele (Sergio Bonelli Editore)
- Arachnea, by Jean Van Hamme and Grzegorz Rosiński, 14th album of the Thorgal series (Le Lombard)

=== May ===
- May 5–28: Star Wars: Episode I - The Phantom Menace by Henry Gilroy (Dark Horse Comics)
- Anarky, vol. 2 - DC Comics
- In the DC Universe, the crossover The Justice Society Returns begins.
- First issue of The Authority by Warren Ellis and Bryan Hitch (WildStorm)
- In Buffy the Vampire Slayer, the story arc Bad Blood begins.
- Anderville by Tito Faraci and Giorgio Cavazzano, first album of MM Mickey Mouse Mystery Magazine (Walt Disney Italia)

=== June ===
- June 4: first album of Gea by Luca Enoch (Sergio Bonelli), fantasy miniseries in an anarchist and feminist key.
- June 18: The Agent 327 story Dossier Minimum Bug is presented to the public. It's the smallest comic book ever, being only 2,6 x 3,7 cm. A year later it lands its author, Martin Lodewijk, an official entry in the Guinness Book of Records.
- June 26: Alex Raymond's Rip Kirby (drawn by John Prentice since 1956) is concluded after 53 years of continuous syndication.
- In Elseworlds 80-Page Giant, Letitia Lerner, Superman's Babysitter by Kyle Baker (DC Comics)
- Cruel and unusual by Jamie Delano, Tom Peyer and John McCrea (Vertigo)
- Hell and back by Frank Miller (Dark Horse)
- The Goon by Eric Powell make its debut with a preview in Avatar Illustrated (Avatar Press)

=== July ===
- July 1: James Sanchez begins publishing the webcomic Bigtime Consulting.
- July 3: Graeme MacKay's newspaper comic Gridlock makes its debut. It will run until 2003.
- July 16: Words & Pictures Museum of Fine Sequential Art closes its doors to the public, becoming the Virtual Words & Pictures Museum.
- July 28: André Franquin's heirs and copyright holders win the trial against the Walt Disney Animation Studios over their animated TV series version of Franquin's comics character Marsupilami, citing breaches of its license contract: Disney had failed to produce thirteen half-hour episodes (instead producing six to eight minute shorts) or use its "best efforts" to secure a commitment from a network to air the show, and it launched its marketing campaign during a time when the show was not being broadcast. Marsu also accused Disney of fraudulent concealment; the judge noted that Disney had decided to not devote sufficient resources to the Marsupilami project, and had concealed this fact from Marsu. Disney pays back the damage and hands the rights to the series back to Franquin's company Marsu Productions.

=== August ===
- August 4: first issue of Tomorrow Stories, ideated by Alan Moore (WildStorm)
- 100 Bullets, by Brian Azzarello and Eduardo Risso, debuts under the Vertigo imprint (cover date).
- In the DC Universe, the crossover Day of Judgment begins.
- Black hills by Yves Swolfs and Marc-Renier.
- L’eterno riposo, (The eternal rest) 11th episode of Julia series, by Sergio Toppi and Giancarlo Berardi (Sergio Bonelli editore)

=== September ===
- September 6: first strip of Get Fuzzy, by Darby Conley.
- First issue of Top 10, by Alan Moore and Gene Ha (WildStorm)
- Vent’anni dopo (Twenty years later) – by Luigi Mignacco, Roberto Diso and Oreste Suarez (Sergio Bonelli); first apparition of Jerome Drake, father of Mister No.

=== October ===
- October 3: The first episode of the Uncle Scrooge story The Coin by Don Rosa is serialized in Picsou Magazine. The story had been realized years ago for Egmont, but was rejected by the editor.
- October 9–10: During the Stripdagen in Den Bosch Peter de Wit receives the Stripschapprijs. Kees Kousemaker, founder of Amsterdam comics store Lambiek, wins the P. Hans Frankfurther Prijs.
- October 21: in the Dutch magazine Donald Duck, Wailing Whalers, drawn by Daan Jippes on a 1972 script by Carl Barks.
- First issue of the limited series L. A. W. by Bob Layton and Dick Giordano (DC Comics)
- Star Rats by Leo Ortolani, parody of Star Wars (Panini Comics)
- Geronimo l’Apache by Jean Giraud, 26th album of Blueberry series (Dargaud)

=== November ===
- November 1: The Dutch comics store Lambiek launches its online comics encyclopedia, nicknamed The Comiclopedia, listing illustrated biographies of all possible comics artists and writers in existence.
- November 10: Surrogates, by Rushbutz R. Abejo and Dexter Villegas, first issue of Angel Classics (Dark Horse Comics).
- November 10: in the Danish magazine Anders And & Co., The Quest for Kalevala by Don Rosa
- Batman: Dark Victory by Jeph Loeb and Tim Sale (DC Comics)
- Strange Adventures vol. 2, #1 - Vertigo
- X-Men: Children of the Atom by Joe Casey and Steve Rude (Marvel)
- Le mal bleu by Jean Van Hamme and Grzegorz Rosiński, 25th album of the Thorgal series

=== December ===
- December 13: Uninvited guests by Andy Watson and Hector Gomez.
- In the JLA series, the saga World War 3. begins (DC Comics)
- Neil Gaiman's Midnight Days (Vertigo Comics)
- First issue of Spider-Man Unlimited Wizard edition.
- X-Men: The Hidden Years by John Byrne and Tom Palmer (Marvel)
- Comix 2000, album realized by 324 independent cartoonist from 29 different countries for the French editor L’association.
- First album of Fisietto & C. La Saga dei Pistis, satirical comic in Sardinian language, realized and auto published by the brothers Bruno and Paolo Tremolo.

== Deaths ==
=== January ===
- January 15: Bozidar Veselinović, Serbian comics artist (Dabisa), dies at age 77.
- January 23: Jaroslav Foglar, Czech novelist and comics writer (Rychlé šípy), dies at age 91.
- January 25: Jean-Gérard Imbar, French novelist, screenwriter and comics writer (Le Polar de Renard, Les Aventures de Protéo), dies at age 54.

=== February ===
- February 3: Vin Sullivan, American comics artist (Spike Spaulding, Jibby Jones, Bucks McKale) and editor, dies at age 87.
- February 26: John L. Goldwater, American comics publisher, co-founder and long-time editor-of-chief of Archie Comics, dies at age 83.

=== March ===
- March 8: Giovan Battista Carpi, Italian comics artist (Disney comics, Rolf Kauka comics), dies at age 71.
- March 12: Lee Falk, American comics writer and artist (The Phantom, Mandrake the Magician), dies at age 88.
- March 14: John Broome, American comic book writer (DC Comics, Flash, Green Lantern), dies at age 85.
- March 17: Eric Stanton, American illustrator and comic artist (Tin Hats, Dianna, Blunder Broad), dies at age 79.

=== April ===
- April 3: Kay Wright, American animator, TV producer and comics artist (Disney comics, Hanna-Barbera comics), dies at age 79.
- April 6: Charles Okerbloom, American comics artist (continued Radiomania), dies at age 90.
- April 10: Cliff Roberts, American photographer, cartoonist, animator and comics artist (Sesame Street comics), dies at age 69.
- April 12:
  - Ricardo Barreiro, Argentine comic book writer (Bárbara, El Eternauta), dies at age 49.
  - Werner Büchi, Swiss caricaturist, illustrator and comics artist (continued Globi), dies at age 83.
- April 13: Filip van der Schalie, Dutch comics artist, radio producer and presenter (Bollie Bof), dies at age 75.
- April 14:
  - Arthur Beeman, American comics artist (Homer Doodle, Inferior Man, Kidding the Kids, Miss Winky, Snappy, Tommy Tinkle, K.P. Jones, Seein' Stars, Those Were The Days), dies at age 85.
  - Vic Herman, American illustrator, designer, cartoonist, puppeteer, TV producer and comics artist (Little Dot, Winnie the WAC, worked for Harvey Comics, Parents' Magazine Press and Toby Press), dies at age 79.
- April 16: Charles McKimson, aka Chuck McKimson, American comics artist and animator (Roy Rogers comic, comics for Dell Publishing), dies at age 84.
- April 20:
  - Berend Dam, Dutch comics artist (De Avonturen van Bully Dog, continued Pinkie Pienter), dies at age 71.
  - Tekin Aral, Turkish comics artist (Tarzan ve Arap Kadri), dies at age 57.
- April 26: Raymond Reding, Belgian comics artist (Jari, Vincent Larcher), dies at age 79.

=== May ===
- May 2: Jean-Paul Dethorey, French comics artist (L' Inspecteur X, Batistin et Big Boogie, Louis La Guigne, Coeur Brûlé), dies at age 64.
- May 12: Saul Steinberg, Romanian-American cartoonist, dies at age 84.
- May 17: Henk Gijsbers, Dutch illustrator, political cartoonist and comics artist, dies at age 68.
- May 23: John Prentice, American comics artist (continued Rip Kirby), dies at age 78.
- May 30: Paul S. Newman, American comics writer (Turok), dies at age 75.

=== June ===
- June 11: Jan Wesseling, Dutch illustrator and comics artist (Marion, comics for Marten Toonder studio, Cis en Soesie, Joker), dies at age 64.
- June 13: Yasuji Tanioka, Japanese comics artist (Nohohon-gotti), dies at age 56.
- June 15: John Glashan, Scottish painter, illustrator, playwright and comics artist (Genius), dies at age 71.

=== July ===
- July 3: Wim van Wieringen, Dutch comics artist, caricaturist and photographer (Simpelman), dies at age 83.
- July 14: Sal Trapani, American comics artist (co-creator of Nukla, worked for Marvel Comics, Gillmor Comics, Charlton Comics, Dell Comics, Gold Key Comics, American Comics Group), dies at age 72.
- July 28: Gustavo Trigo, Argentine comic artist (La Guerra de los Antartes, worked on Sgt. Kirk, Dylan Dog, Nick Raider, Julia, Blackjack), dies at age 58.

=== August ===
- August 8: Yolanda Vargas Dulché, Mexican comics writer (Memín Pinguín), died at age 73.
- August 10: Henri Gillain, Belgian comics writer (Spirou et Fantasio, Tif et Tondu), dies at the age of 85-86.
- August 13: John Geering, British comics artist (Puss 'n' Boots, Smudge and Bananaman), dies at age 58.
- August 19: Arthur Pinajian, Armenian-American painter, comics writer and artist (Madame Fatal, Invisible Hood), dies at age 85.
- August 27: Margaret Ahern, American comics artist (Beano, An Altar Boy Named Speck), dies at age 78.
- August 30: Raymond Poïvet, French comics artist (Les Pionniers de l'Espérance), dies at age 89.

=== September ===
- September 14: Joel Beck, American underground cartoonist (Lenny of Laredo, Marching Marvin, The Profit), dies from complications from alcoholism at age 56.
- September 17:
  - Ray Helle, American comic artist (The Flibbertys, Box Seat, Bible/Crostics, Sam & Ellie, Pet Parade, Life with Lucky), dies at age 82.
  - Antal Szemere, Hungarian comics artist, dies at age 76.
- September 29: Alfred J. Buescher, American comics artist (Illustrated Sunday School Lesson, Joe and Judy, Eski), dies at age 96.
- September 30: Antoni Batllori Jofré, Spanish comics artist (published in TBO), dies at age 84.

=== October ===
- October 29: Greg, Belgian comics artist and writer (Achille Talon, Bernard Prince, Comanche, Bruno Brazil), dies at age 68.

=== November ===
- November 2: Dick Turner, American comics artist (Carnival, Mr. Merryweather), dies at age 90.
- November 12: Guy Oulié, French comic artist (Texas Bill), dies at age 74.
- November 14:
  - Giorgio Bordini, Italian comics artist, animator and illustrator (He and She, Disney comics), dies at age 72.
  - Jacky Pals, Belgian comics artist (Studio Vandersteen, worked on Bessy), dies at age 52 from legionnaires' disease.

=== December ===
- December 1: Thornton Robyn Utz, American illustrator and comics artist (made pantomime comics for The Saturday Evening Post), dies at age 85.
- December 3: Péter Kuczka, Hungarian poet, editor, writer, comics writer and artist, dies at age 76.
- December 5: Ruth Carroll, American illustrator and comic artist (continued Just Among Us Girls and The Pussycat Princess), dies at age 100.
- December 10: Al Stahl, American animator and comics artist (Flatfoot Burns, Star Detective), dies at age 83.
- December 14: Jan Mintaraga, aka Suwalbiyanto Soemodihardjo, Indonesian comics artist (Sebuah Noda Hitam), dies at age 58 from lung cancer.
- December 15: Rune Andréasson, Swedish comics artist (Bamse), dies at age 74.
- December 16: Marcel Remacle, Belgian comics artist (Bobosse, Le Vieux Nick et Barbe-Noire, Hultrasson), dies at age 73.
- December 23: Captain Roscoe Fawcett, American comics writer (Screen Oddities, with Bud Thompson), dies at age 86.
- December 24: Vic Neill, British comics artist (The McTickles, Wee Ben Nevis, Billy Whizz, Tim Traveller, Plug, continued Mickey the Monkey), dies at age 58.
- December 27: Wilfred Limonious, Jamaican comics artist and illustrator (Chicken, Amos), dies at age 50.
- December 31: Roger Lécureux, French comics writer (Les Pionniers de l' Espérance, Rahan) and chief editor of Vaillant), dies at age 74.

=== Specific date unknown ===
- Erwin Hess, American comics artist (worked for Dell Comics, celebrity comics based on Gene Autry), dies at age 86.
- Doug Maxted, British-Australian comics artist (Uncle Si, The Family Next Door, Pirate Pete, Rollo of the Big Top, Dick Weston, Star Reporter, Big Rick Roland), dies at age 84 or 85.
- Helene Rother, German-American automotive designer and comic artist (Jimmy Jupiter), dies at age 90.
- Juan Sarompas, Spanish comics artist (Thomas, der Trommler, Tex & Mex, James Bond comics), dies at age 55 or 56.
- Jon St. Ables, British-Canadian comics artist (Brok Windsor), dies at age 94.
- Bang Yeong-jin, South-Korean comics artist (Yakdongi, Yakdongiwa Yeongpali), dies at age 59 or 60.

== Conventions ==
- February 27–28: Alternative Press Expo (San Jose, California)
- March 5–7: MegaCon (Orlando, Florida)
- April 2–4: Comics 99 (Watershed Media Center and Swallow Royal, Bristol, England, U.K.) — first iteration of Comic Festival; 2,500 attendees; presentation of the National Comics Awards; guests include Phil Winslade, Steve Pugh, Steve Dillon, Scott Dunbier, Peter Hogan, Grant Morrison, Charlie Adlard, Kev F. Sutherland, Glenn Fabry, Metaphrog, Al Davison, Dave Gibbons, Bryan Talbot, Shelly Roeberg, Kyle Baker, John McCrea, Rich Johnston, Gary Spencer Millidge, and Jamie Delano
- April 16–18: WonderCon (Oakland Convention Center, Oakland, California)
- April 23–25: Pittsburgh Comicon (Pittsburgh Expomart, Monroeville, Pennsylvania) — 7,500 attendees; guests include Martin Nodell, Alley Baggett, Lou Ferrigno, George Steele, and Steve Lieber
- May 1–2, 1999: LuluCon III: "Comics are Books, Too!" (Miyako Inn and Spa, Los Angeles, California)
- May 7–9: New York Comic and Fantasy Creators Convention (Madison Square Garden Expo Center, New York City)—300 exhibitors, including Marvel Comics, DC Comics, Harris Comics, Crucial Comics, Visage Studios, and Wizard Entertainment; guests include Joe Simon and John Romita, Jr.
- May 14–16: Motor City Comic Con I (Novi Expo Center, Novi, Michigan)
- Summer: "Space CAPTION 99" (Oxford Union Society, Oxford, England) — guests include Bryan Talbot
- June 18–20: Heroes Convention (Charlotte Convention Center, Charlotte, North Carolina)
- July 1–4: Dragon Con (Hyatt Regency Atlanta/Atlanta Merchandise Mart/Atlanta Apparel Mart, Atlanta, Georgia)—19,000 attendees
- July 9–11: Wizard World Chicago (Rosemont, Illinois)
- August 13–16, Comic-Con International (San Diego Convention Center, San Diego, California)—42,000 attendees; special guests include Tom Batiuk, Chuck Cuidera, Samuel R. Delany, Paul Dini, Arnold Drake, Neil Gaiman, Sam Glanzman, Larry Gonick, Irwin Hasen, Patrick McDonnell, Mike Mignola, Mark Mothersbaugh, Jerry Robinson, Art Spiegelman, Jim Steranko, Jill Thompson, Bruce Timm, and Barry Windsor-Smith
- August 27–29: Fan Expo Canada (Metro Toronto Convention Centre, Toronto, Ontario, Canada)—9,620 attendees; guests include Jeri Ryan, Kevin Smith, Kenny Baker, Warwick Davis, Lou Ferrigno, Joe Quesada, Michael Turner, Mark Waid, Leinil Francis Yu, Keu Cha, and C.B. Cebulski
- September 16–19: Small Press Expo (SPX) / International Comics and Animation Festival (ICAF) (Holiday Inn Select, Bethesda, Maryland) — guests include Charles Burns, Eddie Campbell, Jeff Smith, James Kochalka, Ellen Forney, Jessica Abel, Brian Biggs, Jordan Crane, Jason Lutes, Matt Madden, Steven Weissman,Jis & Trino; also held in conjunction with PACER, the Professional Association of Comics Entertainment Retailers.
- October 23–24: Motor City Comic Con II (Detroit, Michigan) — guests include David W. Mack, Tim Vigil, David Quinn, Vincent Locke, Jill Thompson, Guy Davis, Mark Waid, Devin Grayson, and William Messner-Loebs
- November 12–14: National Comic Book, Comic Art, and Toy Show (New York City)
- November 27–28: Mid-Ohio Con (Adam's Mark Hotel, Columbus, Ohio)

== First issues by title ==
100 Bullets
Release: August by Vertigo. Writer: Brian Azzarello Artist:Eduardo Risso
E.V.E. Protomecha
Release: by Top Cow. Writers: Chris Lichtner and Aron Lusen Artist: Ale Garza
Exit
Release: by Albin Michel. Writer & Artist: Bernard Werber
The Mythology Class
Release: by Tala Comics Publishing. Writer & Artist: Arnold Arre
Strange Adventures
Release: November by Vertigo.
Vampire Girl
Release: by Shodensha. Writer & Artist: Fujiwara Kaoru
