= Bill Acker =

American football player (born 1956)

No. 67, 76, 75, 93
- Position: Nose tackle

Personal information
- Born: November 7, 1956 (age 70); Freer, Texas, U.S.
- Listed height: 6 ft 3 in (1.91 m)
- Listed weight: 255 lb (116 kg)

Career information
- High school: Freer
- College: Texas
- NFL draft: 1980: 6th round, 142nd overall pick

Career history
- St. Louis Cardinals (1980–1981); Kansas City Chiefs (1982); Cincinnati Bengals (1983)*; Buffalo Bills (1983–1984); Kansas City Chiefs (1987)
- * Offseason or practice squad member only

Awards and highlights
- 1975 Astro-Bluebonnet Bowl champion

Career NFL statistics
- Sacks: 0.5
- Fumble recoveries: 1
- Stats at Pro Football Reference

William Berry Acker Jr. (born November 7, 1956) is an American former professional football player who was a defensive tackle for six seasons for the St. Louis Cardinals, Kansas City Chiefs, and Buffalo Bills of the National Football League (NFL). He played college football for the Texas Longhorns and was drafted by the Cardinals in the 6th round of the 1980 NFL draft (#142 overall).

== Early Life ==
Bill Acker attended Freer High School where he was a four-sport letterman in football, basketball, baseball (pitcher) and track (shot put and discus). Playing alongside future Texas Longhorn and Hall-of-Famer Steve McMichael, he won three straight district championships while earning consensus Class AA All-State honors as both a linebacker and an offensive lineman. He made the all-district team 5 times (3 times on defense and twice on offense - once 2nd team) and was named all South Texas defense in his last two seasons. He helped Freer advance to the regionals in his sophomore year, go undefeated in the regular season and advanced to the state quarterfinals in his junior year and make it the 2nd round of the playoffs in his senior year. He was also named 2nd Team All-State linebacker on the "Super Team", considering all players in the state.

After his senior year he was named the top high school lineman in the state by the Harris Rating System and played in the North-South All-Star game.

He had success in track as well in shot put and discus. He won the District shot put championship three years in a row. He competed in the AAU Junior Olympics making it as far as the South Texas Association Championships in 1972, the regionals in 1973 and state in 1974. He went to the Texas state high school championships in shot put three years in row, coming in 5th in 1973, 3rd the next year and 2nd in his senior year to future Texas A&M Hall of Fame running back George Woodward. In 1975 he set the South Texas record for Class AA in the shot put with a throw of 59 feet, 11 inches (it was topped by his brother Jim in 1977). He won the district discus championship in 1974, beating out his younger brother Jim, who finished 2nd in that as well as shot put, and helping Freer to a District championship.

In his senior year he also helped Freer win the District 31-AA North Zone championship in baseball, going 3-1 as a pitcher and leading the team in hitting, batting 0.454. On this team, as well as basketball, he also played with his brother and McMichael.

== College career ==
Acker played college football at The University of Texas between 1975 and 1979, but missed the 1976 season.

In 1975, Acker started the season at offensive tackle but was moved to linebacker and sometimes defensive tackle. That year he played in four games, recording 5 tackles, as the Longhorns won a share of the Southwest Conference Championship, defeated Colorado in the 1975 Astro-Bluebonnet Bowl and finishing ranked #6/#7.

In 1976, he was moved again, to offensive guard, then back to linebacker and then redshirted to prepare him to play defensive tackle.

In 1977, he played in every game but one, recorded 65 tackles, including 2.5 TFLs for 25 yards, 19 QB Hits and a safety. He alternated most of the season with fellow defensive tackle McMichael - both spent part of the season as starters - and they helped the Longhorns win the Southwest Conference Championship, spend the last 6 weeks of the season ranked #1 and play for the National Championship in the 1978 Cotton Bowl Classic.They lost the game to Notre Dame after the Irish scored 21 points off of turnovers in the 2nd half, catapulting Notre Dame to the victory and the National Championship.

For his junior year he was moved to the left-side DT, with McMichael on the right. He helped the team win the 1978 Sun Bowl and finish ranked #9 while he was named second-team All-Southwest Conference. He tied the then-school record for sacks in a season with 14 and led the team in forced fumbles (6), the second most in a season in school history at the time.

In 1979, he was moved back to right tackle. He was also a team captain for a Longhorn team that finished ranked #12/13 and went to the Sun Bowl, but had been expected to do more. After the Baylor game, he was named SWC defensive player of the week. Over the season, he recorded 102 tackles, 13.5 TFLs, 6 sacks and a fumble recovery and was again named second-team All-Conference. He was also an AP All-American Honorable Mention.

In the four seasons he played for Texas, the Longhorns were never unranked. Acker left the school having gotten more sacks in his career than any other Longhorn prior to him and topped only by teammate Tim Campbell. He also had the 2nd most forced fumbles.

After the season was over he played in the 1980 Japan Bowl.

== Professional career ==
Bill Acker played nose tackle in the NFL for 3 teams over 6 seasons.

=== St. Louis Cardinals ===
Acker was selected by the Cardinals in the sixth round of the 1980 NFL draft, #142 overall. He played all 16 games his rookie year, starting 4 and recording a fumble recovery.

The next year he played only 8 games.

=== Kansas City Chiefs ===
He played for the Chiefs in 1982, but for only 3 games.

=== Buffalo Bills ===
Over the next two seasons he played for the Bills in 26 games, never as a starter. Heading into the 1985 season, he was released by the Bills.

=== Kansas City Chiefs (2nd stint) ===
During the 1987 player's strike, Acker was re-signed by the Chiefs and started two games for them.

== Personal life ==
His brother Jim played college baseball at Texas while Bill was there and is a former MLB pitcher.
