= Freer High School =

Public school in Texas, United States

Location
- P.O. Box 240; Freer, Texas 78357; United States; 27.8719°N 98.6189°W

Information
- School type: Public high school
- School district: Freer Independent School District
- Principal: Conrad Cantu
- Teaching staff: 17.44 (FTE)
- Grades: 9-12
- Enrollment: 188 (2023–2024)
- Student to teacher ratio: 10.78
- Colors: Royal Blue & Gold
- Athletics conference: UIL Class AA
- Mascot: Buckaroos/Lady Bucks
- Yearbook: The Wildcatter
- Website: Freer High School

Freer High School is a public high school located in the city of Freer, Texas, USA and classified as a 2A school by the UIL. It is a part of the Freer Independent School District located in northwestern Duval County. In 2015, the school was rated "Met Standard" by the Texas Education Agency.

== Athletics ==
The Freer Buckaroos compete in these sports:

- Baseball
- Basketball
- Football
- Powerlifting
- Softball
- Track
- Volleyball

=== State titles ===
- Baseball
  - 1990(3A)
- Volleyball
  - 1993(2A)

== Notable alumni ==
- Bill Acker (Class of 1976) professional football player for NFL St. Louis Cardinals, the Kansas City Chiefs, and the Buffalo Bills.
- Jim Acker (Class of 1976) professional baseball player.
- Steve McMichael (Class of 1976) professional football player for NFL Chicago Bears.
- John Prentice (Class of 1939), cartoonist and comic-book artist
