= Freer Independent School District =

School district in Texas, United States

Address
- 905 South Norton Freer, Texas, 78357; United States

District information
- Grades: PK–12
- Schools: 3
- NCES District ID: 4819820

Students and staff
- Students: 706 (2023–2024)
- Teachers: 53.03 (on an FTE basis)
- Student–teacher ratio: 13.31:1

Other information
- Website: www.freerisd.org

Freer Independent School District is a public school district based in Freer, Texas, United States.

In 2009, the school district was rated "academically acceptable" by the Texas Education Agency.

== Schools ==
- Freer High School (Grades 9-12)
- Freer Junior High (Grades 6-8)
- Norman Thomas Elementary (Grades PK-5)
