= KBRA =

- Freer, Texas; United States
- Frequency: 95.9 MHz
- Branding: NewsTalk 95.9

Programming
- Format: News/Talk

Ownership
- Owner: Cobra Broadcasting, LLC - KBRA

History
- First air date: 1985
- Former call signs: KAUA (1983–1985); KOBR (1985)

Technical information
- Licensing authority: FCC
- Facility ID: 72766
- Class: A
- ERP: 190 watts
- HAAT: 142 meters (466 ft)
- Transmitter coordinates: 27°51′17″N 98°35′49″W

Links
- Public license information: Public file; LMS

KBRA (95.9 FM) is a radio station licensed to Freer, Texas, United States. The station is currently owned by Cobra Broadcasting, LLC - KBRA.

== History ==
The Federal Communications Commission issued a construction permit for the station on 1982-10-29. The station was assigned the call sign KAUA on 1983-01-04, and changed its call sign to KOBR on 1985-01-25. The station received its license to cover on 1985-03-18. On 1985-08-30, the station again changed its call sign to the current KBRA.
