= WCW Monday Nitro debut episode =

Professional wrestling television special

WCW Monday Nitro
- Promotion: World Championship Wrestling
- Brand: Nitro
- Date: September 4, 1995
- City: Bloomington, Minnesota
- Venue: Mall of America

The first episode of the weekly professional wrestling television series WCW Monday Nitro premiered on September 4, 1995. The show aired live on TNT and emanated from inside the Mall of America in Bloomington, Minnesota.

== Storylines ==
The event included four matches that resulted from scripted storylines and the results were predetermined by WCW's writers.

== Event ==
The event aired lived, with David Penzer announcing in the ring, and Steve McMichael, Eric Bischoff and Bobby Heenan commentating during the event.

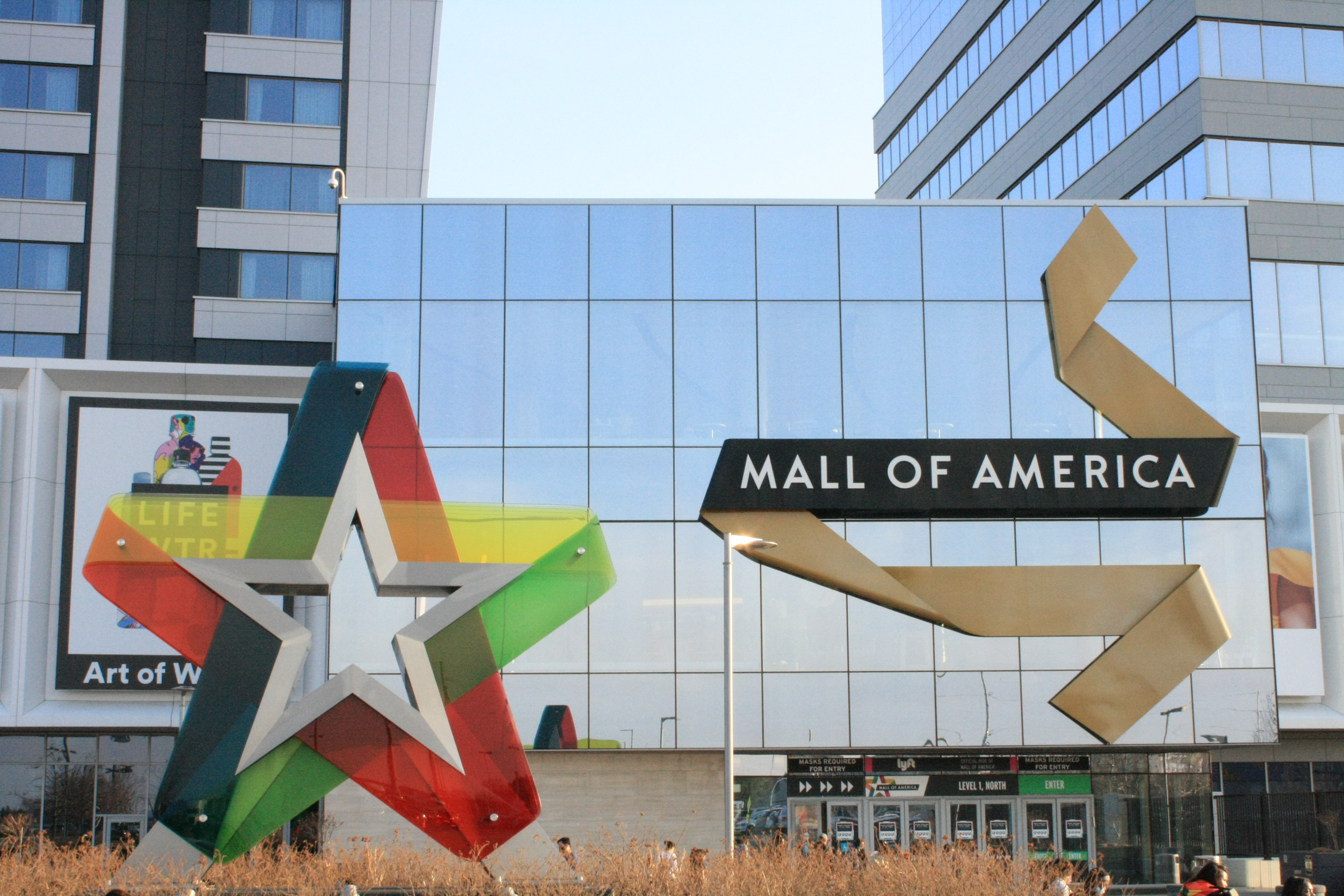
The Mall of America

== Results ==
No.	Results	Stipulations	Times
1	The American Males (Marcus Alexander Bagwell and Scotty Riggs) defeated Bunkhouse Buck and Dick Slater (w/ Col. Robert Parker)	Dark match	—
2	Flyin' Brian defeated Jushin Thunder Liger	Singles match	6:00
3	Sting (c) vs. Ric Flair ended in a no-contest	Singles match for the WCW United States Heavyweight Championship	8:43
4	Hulk Hogan (c) (w/ Jimmy Hart) defeated Big Bubba Rogers	Singles match for the WCW World Heavyweight Championship	7:08
(c) / – the champion(s) heading into the match
