= Ruth and Latrobe Carroll =

Married picture book creators

Ruth Crombie Robinson Carroll (September 24, 1899, Lancaster, New York – December 5, 1999, Stamford, Connecticut) and "Archer" Latrobe Carroll (January 5, 1894 – November 30, 1996) were an American married couple who created children's books illustrated by Ruth. They received the Juvenile Award of the American Association of University Women, North Carolina chapter, in 1953 for Peanut and in 1955 for Digby the Only Dog. They lived in Asheville, North Carolina.

In the U.S. Library of Congress Catalog, the five earliest records of works by Ruth Carroll are for solo picture books published from 1932 to 1937 (unpaginated, as many as 48 pages). The earliest is What Whiskers Did, a Story Without Words (Macmillan, 1932). In 1937, she created Chessie and Her Kittens for the Chesapeake and Ohio Railway. The earliest joint work in the catalog is [The?] Flight of the Silver Bird (NY: J. Messner, Inc., 1939), 94 pp., LCCN 39-29403. About 20 of their books were covered by Kirkus Reviews, perhaps beginning with Scuffles, the subject of a starred blurb in 1943. Other books include Pet Tale (NY: Oxford, 1949) and Salt and Pepper (NY: Oxford, 1952).

The Tatum series features a boy, Beanie Tatum, pet dog Tough Enough, and their family, who live in the Smoky Mountains. The last four of six Tatum books were starred in Kirkus Reviews.

1. Beanie (1953)
2. Tough Enough
3. Tough Enough's Trip
4. Tough Enough's Pony
5. Tough Enough and Sassy (1958)
6. Tough Enough's Indians (1960)

Ruth's latest work in the Library of Congress catalog is a picture book written with Latrobe, Hullabaloo, the elephant dog, featuring a dog employed by a one-ring circus (Kirkus).

Archival repositories holding manuscripts, illustrations, and other material by Ruth and Latrobe Carroll include the Archives and Special Collections Library at Vassar College Libraries, Special Collections and University Archives at University of Oregon Libraries, and Buncombe County Special Collections at Pack Memorial Library in Asheville, North Carolina.
