= Margaret Ahern =

American cartoonist and illustrator (1921–1999)

- Born: Margaret T. McCrohan Ahern; February 16, 1921; New York City, U.S.
- Died: August 27, 1999 (aged 78); Chicago, U.S.
- Other names: Margarita; Peg O'Connell
- Education: Harrison Art School; Chicago Academy of Fine Arts; American Academy of Art; Chicago Art Institute
- Notable work: Beano
- Spouse: Edward Ahern (1947–1999)

Margaret McCrohan Ahern (February 16, 1921 – August 27, 1999) was an American cartoonist and illustrator.

She was educated at Providence High School, the Harrison Art School, and the Chicago Academy of Fine Arts. Ahern worked for the Chicago Archdiocese's New World newspaper (later the Chicago Catholic), as well as the 1950s WGN television show, Cartuno. She drew the monthly strips Beano, from 1948 to 1999, and Angelo, from 1951 to 1954 for The Waifs' Messenger, but is best known as the cartoonist who took over Tut LeBlanc's An Altar Boy Named Speck, which was syndicated by the National Catholic News Service (later known simply as Catholic News Service), following LeBlanc's 1953 death until 1979. Ahern's work on Speck was featured in books published separately as: Speck, the Altar Boy (Hanover House, 1958), Presenting Speck, the Altar Boy (Hanover House, 1960), and A Speck of Trouble; New Escapades of the Inimitable and Irresistible Speck, the Altar Boy (Doubleday, 1964).

Under the pseudonym Margarita, Ahern was also the creator of the comic strip Little Reggie (syndicated by Western Newspaper Union) and, under the pseudonym Peg O'Connell, Our Parish, which was syndicated and then collected in Our Parish (John Knox Press, 1968). She died in 1999.
