= Elena de' Grimani =

Italian comics illustrator (b. 1975)

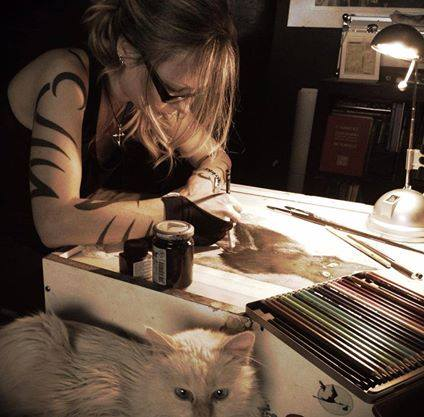
Elena de' Grimani at work

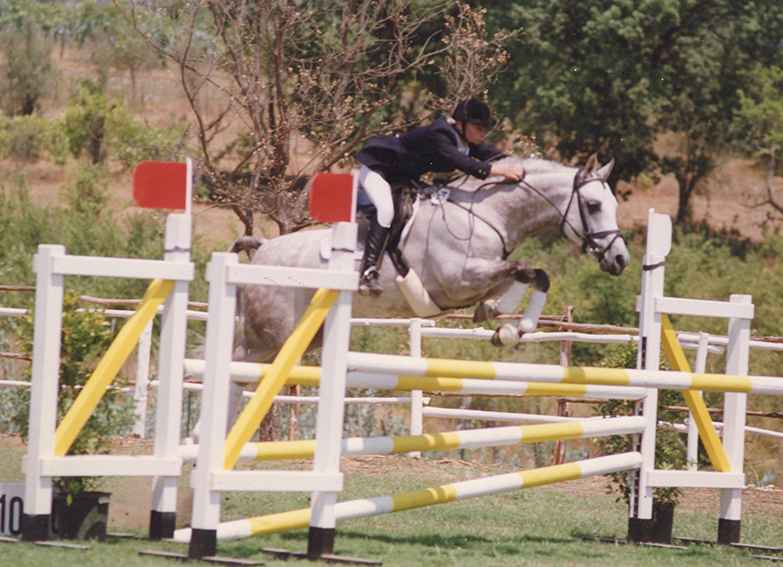
Elena de' Grimani during a competition

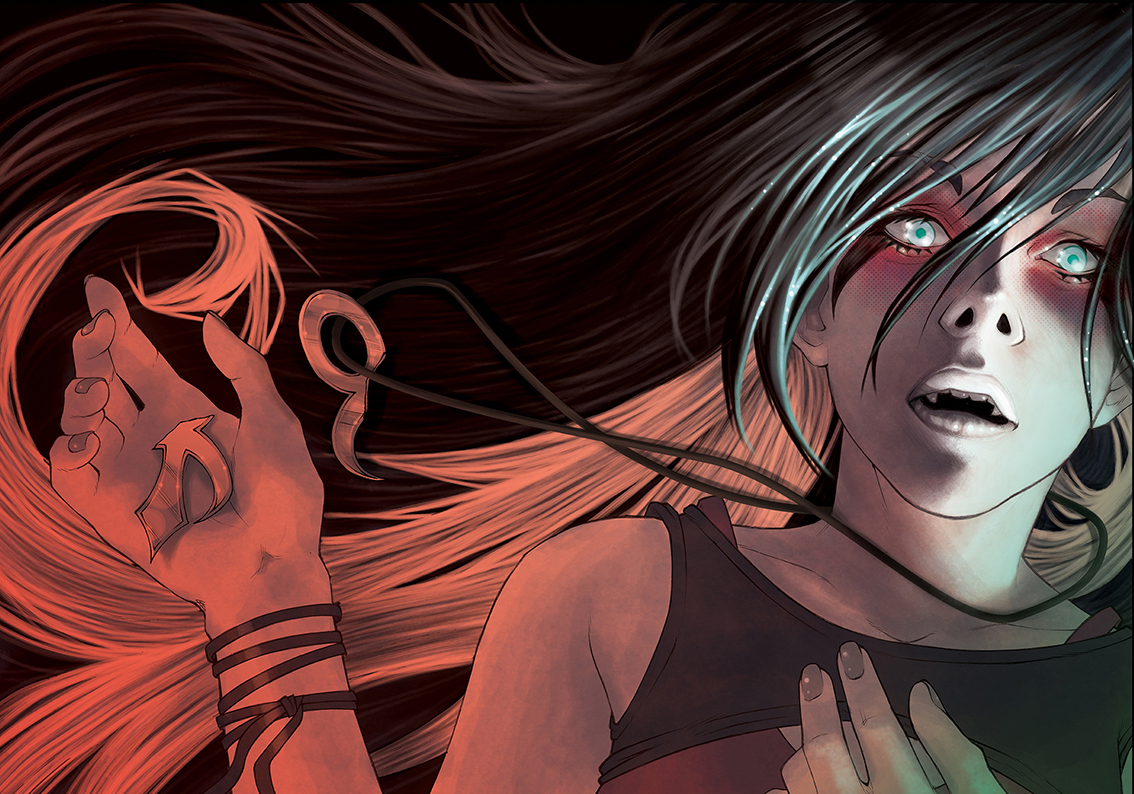
Cover of Rigel-Anedonìa

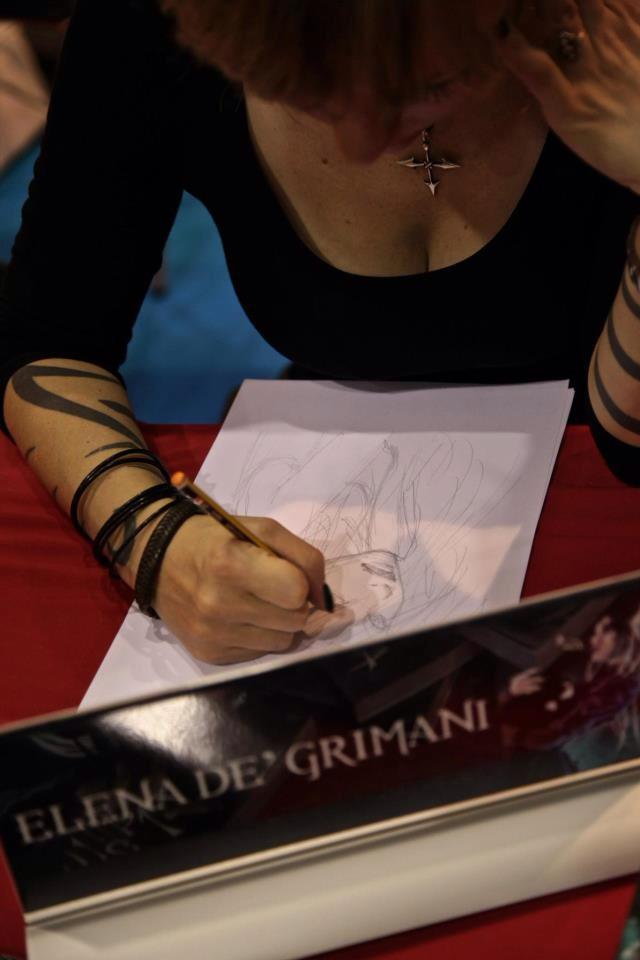
Elena de' Grimani guest artist at Romics, stand PaniniComics, 2012

Elena de' Grimani, also known as Ombra (February 26, 1975), is an Italian comics artist and illustrator, author of the character Rigel.

== Biography and career ==
Born in Rome in the year 1975, she studies at Liceo Artistico Sant'Orsola, where she gets her degree in 1994, then she studied at the Accademia di Belle Arti (painting) and specialized at the Scuola romana dei fumetti. She started a sport career as an horserider when she was a teenager, but had to quit at 20 due to an accident. Her love for comics and Disney animation, and the discovery of Manga as Video Girl Ai of Masakazu Katsura are part of her decision to build a career in comics and figurative arts; she then develops her own style as a graphical mix between realistic and Manga elements.

Her first steps in the comicbook world happened in 1999, at Lucca Comics, with the self-publication of the first book of Rigel, an urban fantasy adventure of a contemporary vampire. After three number plus the spin-off Tinebra, she stops to self publish and co-produce a new comicbook with Rock'n'Comics, the prototype of the soon to follow comicbook Luna, then starts immediately to publish with Panini Comics a four number short series (each one composed of 96 pg.) named Rigel Interlunium (2001), a remake/restyling of Rigel and Tinebra with the help of Fabrizio Palmieri for parts of the screenplay. In the same working period she creates and works on Luna, published by Star Comics, followed by two episodes for the magazine Piccoli Brividi in 2002, where she works as penciler, inker and colorist. From 2006 she then creates one shot of Rigel for magazines as Concrete and Vampiri published by Absoluteblack then a new monographic one shot adventure for Cartoon Club in occasion of the RiminiComix comics festival Gioco di Sangue per la fiera Riminicomix, and after this she kept working and drawing for Star Comics and Red Whale.

In 2011 she works as cover artist for the USA poetry magazine Mythic Delirium. In October 2012, Panini Comics re-prints for the third time "Rigel-Interlunium", this time in a variant-deluxe edition, adding 16 new story pages and covers. In November 2014, a new monographic book of 144 pages with the new adventures of her character Rigel (comics) has been published: called "Rigel: Anedonia" and printend once for Panini Comics: is a reboot of the character, ready for a new course of adventures. In 2013 she works on a full series of realistic portraits of the german band members of Rammstein for an article written by Roberto Recchioni and published on the supplement XL of La Repubblica. In 2015 she works as illustrator for the book of short novels Storie di Gatti: Nuovi racconti a quattro zampe (Buck e il Terremoto Vol. 2).

From 2017 she works with the writer Velma J. Starling, creating covers and internal illustrations for her fantasy saga The Silent Force. In January 2015 she is in the group of artists who express solidarity to the victims of the Charlie Hebdo attack; her contribution is still visible in the website Lo Spazio Bianco.

== Awards ==
- Fumo di China award 2000 (miglior autore esordiente realistico "best new realistic author")

== See also ==
- Rigel
- Vampire literature
