= An Altar Boy Named Speck =

American comic

- Author(s): W. R. "Tut" LeBlanc; Margaret Ahern
- Current status/schedule: Concluded gag cartoon
- Launch date: March 1, 1951
- End date: 1979
- Alternate name(s): Speck the Altar Boy
- Syndicate(s): National Catholic News Service
- Genre(s): Humor, Religion

An Altar Boy Named Speck, also known as Speck the Altar Boy, is an American gag cartoon comic strip series created by Tut LeBlanc. The strip first appeared March 1, 1951 in Catholic Action of the South, which was the official paper of the Roman Catholic Archdiocese of New Orleans. Margaret Ahern continued the Speck comic upon LeBlanc's 1953 death, drawing it until 1979.

The comic is about a mischievous but lovable altar boy who keeps getting into various kinds of trouble.

== Tut LeBlanc ==
Wilmer Ralph "Tut" LeBlanc (born in Perry, Louisiana, 1915; died February 23, 1953) was a self-taught artist. In 1943, he married Mildred Marie Simon. He drew the Speck material while living in Abbeville, Louisiana, where he had spent most of his life. He died in 1953 from heart problems that he had had since childhood.

== Collections ==
The Speck cartoons have been collected in various reprint volumes.

- LeBlanc cartoons
  - An Altar Boy Named “Speck” (Lafayette, LA: Tribune Printing Plant, 1952) - reprinted by Our Sunday Visitor and About Comics.
  - Speck: More Cartoons (Huntington, Indiana: Our Sunday Visitor, 1952)
  - An Altar Boy Named 'Speck': The Collection Compilation (Camarillo, CA: About Comics, 2024) - reprints both previous books as a single volume.
- Ahern cartoons
  - Speck the Altar Boy (Garden City, NY: Hanover House, 1958)
  - Presenting Speck the Altar Boy (Garden City, NY: Hanover House, 1960)
  - Speck: The Altar Boy (New York: All Saints Press, 1963) - reprints all of the first and part of the second Hanover House volumes.
  - A Speck of Trouble: New Escapades of the Inimitable and Irresistible Speck, the Altar Boy (Garden City, NY: Doubleday, 1964)
  - Speck the Altar Boy: The Collection Compilation (Camarillo, CA: About Comics, 2021) - reprints both Hanover House books as a single volume.
