= John Prentice (cartoonist) =

American cartoonist

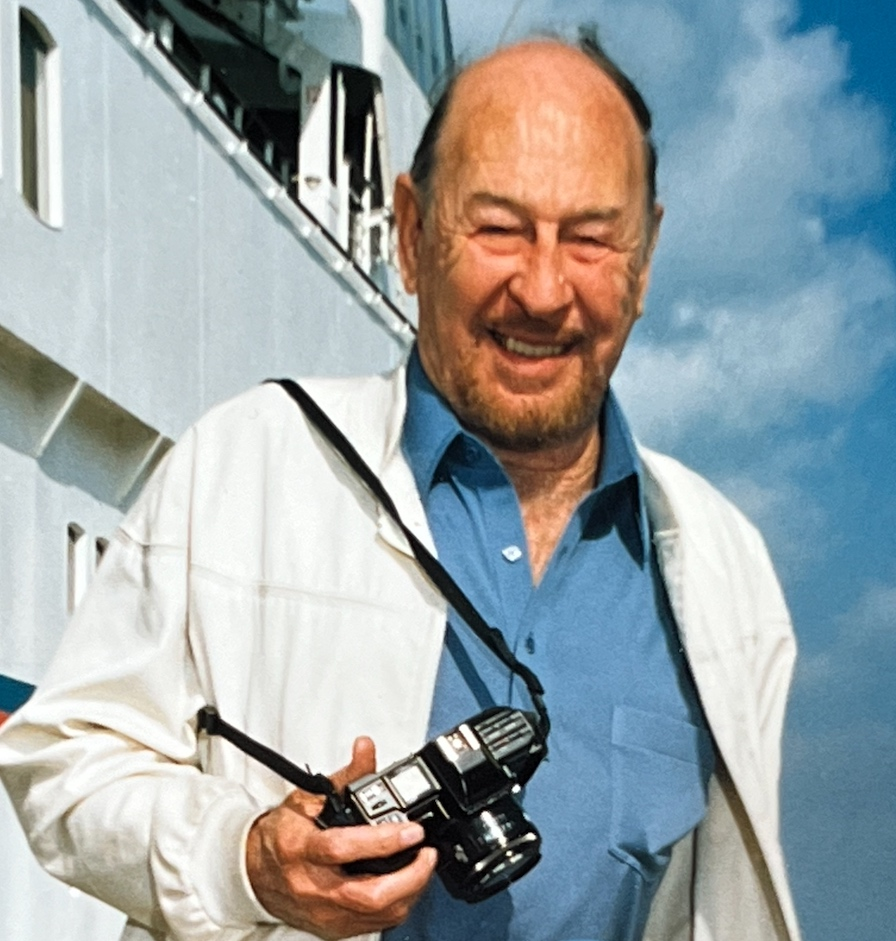
- Prentice c. 1990
- Born: October 17, 1920 Whitney, Texas
- Died: May 23, 1999 (aged 78) Westport, Connecticut
- Notable works: Rip Kirby; Young Romance; Showcase #1

John Franklin Prentice Jr. (October 17, 1920 – May 23, 1999) was an American cartoonist most known for taking over the comic strip Rip Kirby upon the death of the strip's creator, Alex Raymond.

== Early life ==
John Prentice was born in Whitney, Texas, on October 17, 1920, on his family's farm. His family traveled around when he was growing up, and he ended up graduating from Freer High School in Freer, Texas.

Some of Prentice's relatives were willing to help him pay for college, but on the condition that he study "medicine, law, or business." However, as Prentice always wanted to be an artist, he joined the Navy in 1939 to help pay for college, and served until 1945. During his service, he was stationed at Pearl Harbor on December 7, 1941, when it was attacked by Japanese forces.

== Early work ==
After his time in the Navy, Prentice briefly attended the Art Institute of Pittsburgh, and then moved to New York City, where he worked in a variety of illustration and comic-book jobs.

In the late 1940s and early 1950s, Prentice worked for Joe Simon and Jack Kirby's romance comics series Young Romance, which is often considered the first romance comic. Originally published by Crestwood Publications, the series eventually moved to DC Comics, for which Prentice also worked in the mid-1950s.

Among the most notable of his comic-book illustration work for DC Comics were for titles such as House of Secrets, Tales of the Unexpected, Gang Busters, and the first issue of Showcase. Showcase's inaugural issue introduced the character Fireman Farrell, a co-creation of Prentice and writer Arnold Drake's. The character went on to cameo in such titles as Crisis on Infinite Earths #7, putting out a fire, and Batman & Superman: World's Finest #4, where he is shown to be a captain in the Metropolis Fire Department.

== Rip Kirby ==
On September 6, 1956, Flash Gordon creator Alex Raymond was killed in a car crash, leaving his current comic strip, Rip Kirby, without an illustrator. Sylvan Byck, editor for Rip Kirby publisher King Features Syndicate, originally approached Prentice's longtime friend Leonard Starr to take over, though when he turned it down in hopes of getting his own strip picked up, Starr recommended Prentice instead. Prentice drew the strip for the rest of its run, until just before his own death in 1999.

Prentice had several notable assistants on Rip Kirby: Al McWilliams (pre-1960), Al Williamson (1960–63), and Gray Morrow (1970s).

Prentice received the National Cartoonists Society Story Comic Strip Award for Rip Kirby in 1966, 1967, and 1986.

== Personal life ==
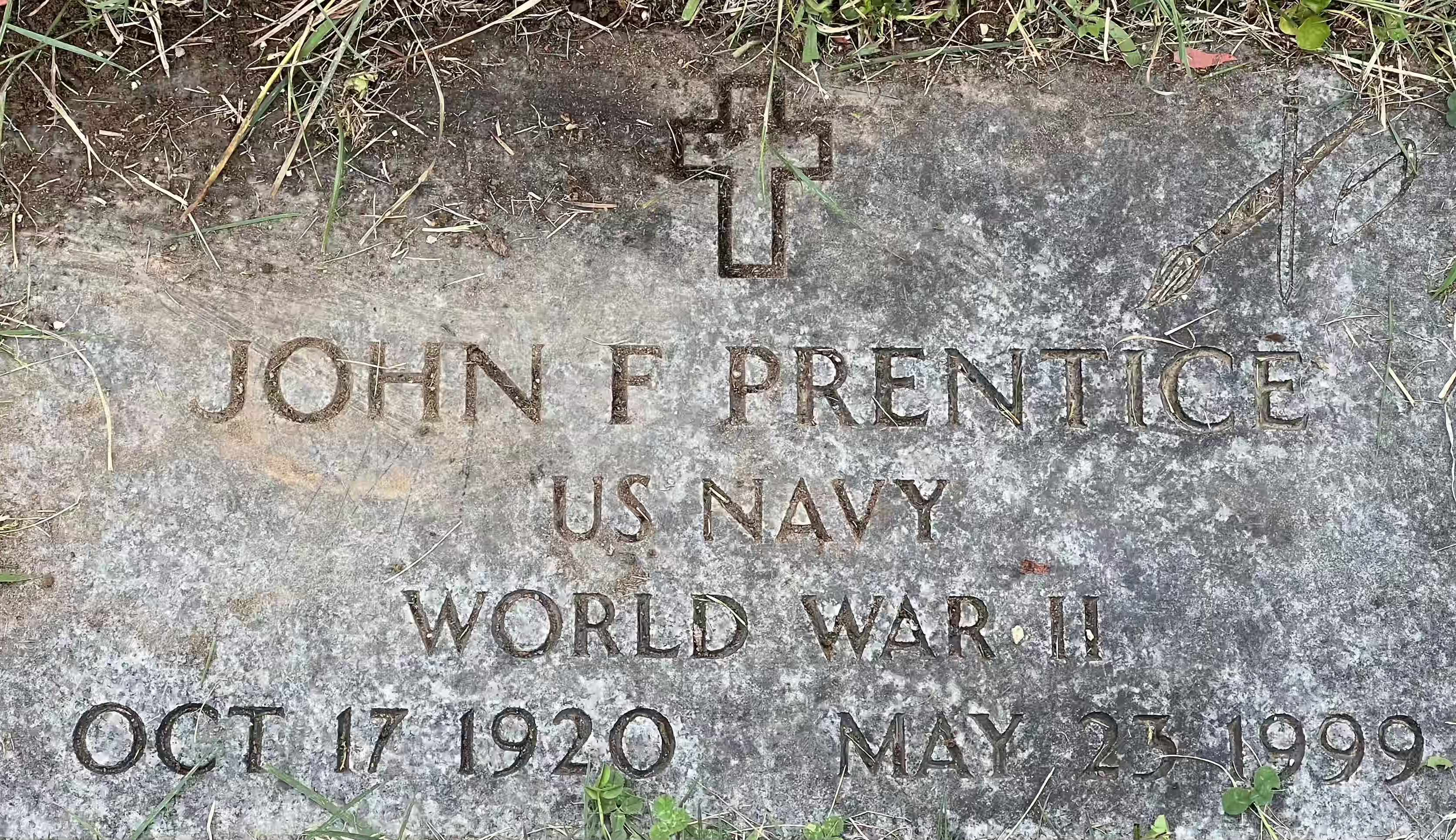
Prentice's grave

John Prentice married his first wife, Margie, in 1945, and their only child, John III, was born in 1948. The two divorced in 1956.

Prentice married his second wife, Cathy, in 1957, with whom he had three more children: Whitney, Cathy, and Priscilla. Eventually, the two of them divorced, as well. (His ex-wife Cathy went on to marry Beetle Bailey creator Mort Walker.)

Prentice later married Antonia, and the two were married until his death in 1999 from mesothelioma. This condition was attributed to his time working as a steam engine fireman in the Navy, as the pipes had asbestos around them.
