= E.V.E. Protomecha =

Comic book series

E.V.E. Protomecha was a comic book series created in 1999 by Chris Lichtner and Aron Lusen (writers) and Ale Garza (penciller), and published by Top Cow/Image Comics. It was collected into a single trade paperback, and has not been expanded since.
