= Rip Kirby =

American comic strip

- Rip Kirby
- Author(s): Ward Greene (1946–1956); Fred Dickenson (1956–mid-1980s); John Prentice (mid-1980s–1999)
- Illustrator(s): Alex Raymond (1946–1956); John Prentice (1956–1999)
- Current status/schedule: Defunct daily strip
- Launch date: March 4, 1946
- End date: June 26, 1999
- Syndicate: King Features
- Publisher(s): David McKay Publications; IDW Publishing
- Genre: Detective fiction

Rip Kirby is an American comic strip created by Alex Raymond and Ward Greene featuring the adventures of private detective Rip Kirby. The strip ran from 1946 to 1999 and was in the hands of artist John Prentice for more than 40 years.

== Publication history ==
After World War II, Raymond did not return to work on any of his previous successful comic strips (Flash Gordon, Jungle Jim, Secret Agent X-9), but instead began work on a new strip in which ex-Marine Rip Kirby returns from World War II and goes to work as a private detective, sometimes accompanied by his girlfriend, fashion model Judith Lynne "Honey" Dorian. (Her given name and nickname were borrowed from the names of Raymond's three daughters.)

Rip Kirby was based on the suggestion by King Features editor Ward Greene that Raymond try a "detective-type" strip. First published on March 4, 1946, the strip was given significant promotion by the syndicate, even including fully painted promotional art, a rarity in comic-strip promotions. The strip enjoyed success, and Raymond received the Reuben Award in 1949.

During Raymond's years on the strip, the stories were initially written by Ward Greene, and later, following Greene's death, by Fred Dickenson. Some sequences were also written by Raymond. In 1956, Raymond was killed in a car crash. King Features quickly needed a replacement, and found it in John Prentice. Dickenson continued to write the series until the mid-1980s, when he was forced to retire for health reasons. Prentice then took over the writing along with others. Prentice kept the strip going until his own death in 1999. The strip ended with Rip's retirement on June 26, 1999. Prentice received the National Cartoonists Society Story Comic Strip Award for 1966, 1967, and 1986 for his work on the strip.

Over the years of publication, the strip was ghosted and assisted by many artists and writers, including Frank Bolle (who completed the last episode), Al Williamson, and Gray Morrow.

A new ongoing Rip Kirby comic was commenced in 2026 by Mad Cave Studios. The title is penned by Christopher Sebela and drawn by Tango.

== Characters and story ==
Comics historian Don Markstein notes how the character of Remington "Rip" Kirby broke away from the usual pulp detective archetype:

Circulation rose steadily during the strip's first few years — even tho' Rip wasn't the kind of private detective they were used to from pulp fiction. This one did more cogitating than fisticuffing, and smoked a leisurely pipe while he did it. He had a frail, balding assistant, Desmond (a former burglar), instead of a two-fisted sidekick. Instead of carrying on with an endless series of female clients, he had a steady girlfriend, Honey Dorian. If that wasn't enough, he even wore glasses! Even Kerry Drake didn't depart so far from the standard. If Rip was more sophisticated and urbane than the average fictional private eye, that's okay, because he was very successful — both for himself and for the people who wrote, drew and distributed him.

== Writers and artists ==
Writers	Artists	Assistants	
AR Alex Raymond; FB Frank Bolle; FD Fred Dickenson; JP John Prentice; WG Ward Greene	AR Alex Raymond; AW Al Williamson; FB Frank Bolle; JP John Prentice	AM Al McWilliams; AW Al Williamson; AT Angelo Torres; BF Bob Fujitani; DA Dan Adkins; FB Frank Bolle	GE George Evans; GM Gray Morrow; LS Leonard Starr; NA Neal Adams; TB Tex Blaisdell; WB Wayne Boring

== Reception ==
Writer Mike W. Barr described Rip Kirby as a "great syndicated detective strip." He added "Raymond's artistry gave the world populated by Kirby & co. a lushness and fluidity that the comics pages had never seen".

== Reprints ==
In 1948, Rip Kirby strips were reprinted in issues #51 and #54 of David McKay Publications's Feature Book. Issue #51 included a biography of Alex Raymond with a photograph showing him sketching an unnamed model for Honey Dorian. In 1980, Pacific Comics Club reprinted the 1946-1950 strips in 16 comic books. In 1988, Pioneer published 6 books and 2 more collections the following year.

=== Internationally Published Reprints ===
Some of the Rip Kirby comic strips were reprinted in India as comic books in the popular comic book series called Indrajal Comics.

The strip was published in a dozen comic book magazines in former Yugoslavia. In 1983 Radio Television of Serbia produced an educational series about comics, which included live action sequences featuring Nebojsa Krstic as Rip Kirby and Predrag Milinkovic as his butler. Milinkovic looked the part insomuch that he was nicknamed Desmond. From 2011 to 2019 Croatian publisher Fibra reprinted the complete 1946-1999 strip in 19 volumes.

=== IDW Publishing ===
In 2009, IDW Publishing started to reprint the Rip Kirby strip as part of its The Library of American Comics. The first four volumes contain a complete reprint of Raymond's stories including the last one, finished by Prentice. Volume 5 continues with Prentice's work.

№	Years	ISBN	Notes
1	1946–48	978-1600104848	Preface (by Dean Mullaney); Crime does pay (by Tom Roberts); "The war made a realist out of me" (by Brian Walker)
2	1948–51	978-1600105821	Introduction (by Howard Chaykin); "Let's not slurp our soup" (by Brian Walker)
3	1951–54	978-1600107856	"Comic-Art Work is an Art-Form in Itself" (by Brian Walker)
4	1954–56	978-1600109898	"He was completely absorbed with Rip and seeking his own pleasures" (by Brian Walker)
5	1956–59	978-1613773567	"Getting Rip Kirby was the natural way for him to go" (by Brian Walker)
6	1959–62	978-1613777107	Introduction (by Brian Walker)
7	1962–64	978-1631400346	"Like father, like son" (by Brian Walker)
8	1964–67	978-1631403040	"John Prentice in his own words" (compiled by Brian Walker)
9	1967–70	978-1631407543	"The tenor of the times" (by Bruce Canwell)
10	1970–73	978-1631409226	"Untarnished after twenty-five years" (by Bruce Canwell)
11	1973–75	978-1684054978	"A Respite from the Headlines"

== Story list ==
The Rip Kirby comic strip stories
№	Title	Writer(s)	Artist(s)	Dates	№ of strips	Strip №	Reprinted in
1	"The Chip Faraday Murder"	WG&AR	AR	1946-03-04 / 1946-04-22	43	1-43	IDW1
2	"The Hicks Formula"		AR	1946-04-23 / 1946-06-26	56	44-99	IDW1
3	"Liquid Murder"		AR	1946-06-27 / 1946-11-02	111	100-210	IDW1
4	"Fatal Forgeries"		AR	1946-11-04 / 1947-01-20	67	211-277	IDW1
5	"Past Imperfect"		AR	1947-01-21 / 1947-05-24	107	278-384	IDW1
6	Death in the Doll's House		AR	1947-05-26 / 1947-10-11	120	385-504	IDW1
7	Bleak Prospects		AR	1947-10-13 / 1948-06-12	210	505-714	IDW1
8	Terror on the Thames		AR	1948-06-14 / 1948-12-04	150	715-864	IDW1
9	Major Mystery		AR	1948-12-06 / 1949-01-08	30	865-894	IDW2
10	Family Fortune		AR	1949-01-10 / 1949-05-21	114	895-1008	IDW2
11	Second Chances		AR	1949-05-23 / 1949-09-03	90	1009-1098	IDW2
12	Lost and Found		AR	1949-09-05 / 1949-12-03	78	1099-1176	IDW2
13	"Borrowed" Trouble		AR	1949-12-05 / 1950-03-25	96	1177-1272	IDW2
14	Correspondence Crisis		AR	1950-03-27 / 1950-06-10	66	1273-1338	IDW2
15	Treasure Hunt		AR	1950-06-12 / 1950-09-23	90	1339-1428	IDW2
16	Mystery of the Missing Songstress		AR	1950-09-25 / 1950-12-23	78	1429-1506	IDW2
17	Unlucky Seven		AR	1950-12-25 / 1951-04-28	108	1507-1614	IDW2
18	The Great You		AR	1951-04-30 / 1951-09-22	126	1615-1740	IDW2
19	The Disappearance of Bijou Benson		AR	1951-09-24 / 1952-01-26	108	1741-1848	IDW3
20	Hell Hath No Fury ...		AR	1952-01-28 / 1952-05-24	102	1849-1950	IDW3
21	Return of the Mangler		AR	1952-05-26 / 1952-09-27	108	1951-2058	IDW3
22	The Millbanks Murder Case		AR	1952-09-29 / 1953-01-31	108	2059-2166	IDW3
23	The Treasure of Silas Stone		AR	1953-02-02 / 1953-05-09	84	2167-2250	IDW3
24	International Incident		AR	1953-05-11 / 1953-09-05	102	2251-2352	IDW3
25	Monkey Business		AR	1953-09-07 / 1953-11-21	66	2353-2418	IDW3
26	Calendar Girl		AR	1953-11-23 / 1954-04-17	126	2419-2544	IDW3
27	Grand Passion		AR	1954-04-19 / 1954-07-10	72	2545-2616	IDW4
28	In Freedom's Cause		AR	1954-07-12 / 1954-12-25	144	2617-2760	IDW4
29	Kismet		AR	1954-12-27 / 1955-04-09	90	2761-2850	IDW4
30	Carno's Carnivores		AR	1955-04-11 / 1955-07-09	78	2851-2928	IDW4
31	Hep-Cat Hijackers		AR	1955-07-11 / 1955-09-24	66	2929-2994	IDW4
32	Turnabout Justice		AR	1955-09-26 / 1955-11-26	54	2995-3048	IDW4
33	The Reluctant Heiress		AR	1955-11-28 / 1956-02-18	72	3049-3120	IDW4
34	The Missing Key		AR	1956-02-20 / 1956-05-19	78	3121-3198	IDW4
35	Zero Hour	FD	AR	1956-05-21 / 1956-07-28	60	3199-3258	IDW4
36	Elixir of Youth		AR; JP	1956-07-30 / 1956-09-29; 1956-10-01 / 1956-10-20	54; 18	3259-3312; 3313-3330	IDW4
37	Misdirections		JP	1956-10-22 / 1957-02-16	102	3331-3432	IDW5
38	Dangerous Deceptions		JP	1957-02-18 / 1957-05-25	84	3433-3516	IDW5
39	Casino Con		JP	1957-05-27 / 1957-08-10	66	3517-3582	IDW5
40	Sirene		JP	1957-08-12 / 1957-12-07	102	3583-3684	IDW5
41	The Fatal Photo		JP	1957-12-09 / 1958-02-08	54	3685-3738	IDW5
42	Into the Eye of Monara		JP	1958-02-10 / 1958-06-14	108	3739-3846	IDW5
43	Murderous Masquerade		JP	1958-06-16 / 1958-08-23	60	3847-3906	IDW5
44	ESP Extortion		JP	1958-08-25 / 1958-11-01	60	3907-3966	IDW5
45	A Date with Destiny		JP	1958-11-03 / 1959-02-28	102	3967-4068	IDW5
46	Case of the Twin Who Didn't Exist		JP	1959-03-02 / 1959-06-06	84	4069-4152	IDW5
47	Matches in the Telescope		JP	1959-06-08 / 1959-10-03	102	4153-4254	IDW6
48	Ghost Town Showdown		JP	1959-10-05 / 1959-12-05	54	4255-4308	IDW6
49	Doom on the High Seas		JP	1959-12-07 / 1960-04-09	108	4309-4416	IDW6
50	Fortune's Folly		JP	1960-04-11 / 1960-08-13	108	4417-4524	IDW6
51	Treasure Haven		JP	1960-08-15 / 1960-11-19	84	4525-4608	IDW6
52	Honor's Choice		AW	1960-11-21 / 1961-04-08	120	4609-4728	IDW6
53	The Town That Time Forgot		JP	1961-04-10 / 1961-09-16	138	4729-4866	IDW6
54	Too Much Amour		JP	1961-09-18 / 1962-02-10	126	4867-4992	IDW6
55	All for Love		JP	1962-02-12 / 1962-04-28	66	4993-5058	IDW7
56	Peril of the Poet Crook		JP	1962-04-30 / 1962-08-11	90	5059-5148	IDW7
57	The Unwilling Heir		JP	1962-08-13 / 1962-11-10	78	5149-5226	IDW7
58	Ming the Merciless		JP	1962-11-12 / 1963-03-09	102	5227-5328	IDW7
59	Sting of the Scorpion		JP	1963-03-11 / 1963-08-03	126	5329-5454	IDW7
60	Poison Pen Campaign		JP	1963-08-05 / 1963-12-14	114	5455-5568	IDW7
61	Duelling Detectives		JP	1963-12-16 / 1964-03-14	78	5569-5646	IDW7
62	Fagin's Folly		JP	1964-03-16 / 1964-07-11	102	5647-5748	IDW7
63	Bond Hunt		JP	1964-07-13 / 1964-10-10	78	5749-5826	IDW7
64	Prettypetal's Poison Plant Plan		JP	1964-10-12 / 1964-11-28	42	5827-5868	IDW8
65	A Prince in Peril		JP	1964-11-30 / 1965-04-03	108	5869-5976	IDW8
66	Past and Present		JP	1965-04-05 / 1965-06-26	72	5977-6048	IDW8
67	Prim's Plunder		JP	1965-06-28 / 1965-09-25	78	6049-6126	IDW8
68	The Chameleon Strikes		JP	1965-09-27 / 1965-12-04	60	6127-6186	IDW8
69	Deceiving Appearances		JP	1965-12-06 / 1966-03-19	90	6187-6276	IDW8
70	The Shape of Things to Come		JP	1966-03-21 / 1966-07-30	114	6277-6390	IDW8
71	Hi Seas Hi-Jinx		JP	1966-08-01 / 1966-10-22	72	6391-6462	IDW8
72	Fatal Fortunes		JP	1966-10-24 / 1966-12-31	60	6463-6522	IDW8
73	Too Much Amour, Too		JP	1967-01-02 / 1967-03-25	72	6523-6594	IDW8
74	Hostile Takeover		JP	1967-03-27 / 1967-07-08	90	6595-6684	IDW8
75	Desmond's Betrayal		JP	1967-07-10 / 1967-11-04	102	6685-6786	IDW9
76	Hijacked		JP	1967-11-06 / 1968-03-16	114	6787-6900	IDW9
77	The Almost-Perfect Crime		JP	1968-03-18 / 1968-07-06	96	6901-6996	IDW9
78	Who's Got Who		JP	1968-07-08 / 1968-10-26	96	6997-7092	IDW9
79	You Can't Judge a Book ...		JP	1968-10-28 / 1969-03-08	114	7093-7206	IDW9
80	Treachery on Tanga		JP	1969-03-10 / 1969-06-07	78	7207-7284	IDW9
81	Rip Kirby, Butler		JP	1969-06-09 / 1969-10-04	102	7285-7386	IDW9
82	Kirby on Campus		JP	1969-10-06 / 1970-01-10	84	7387-7470	IDW9
83	Immortal Mystery		JP	1970-01-12 / 1970-04-25	90	7471-7560	IDW9
84	Dr. Data's Deadly Predictions		JP	1970-04-27 / 1970-08-01	84	7561-7644	IDW10
85	Ghost Town Death Duel		JP	1970-08-03 / 1970-11-28	102	7645-7746	IDW10
86	Femina Fatale		JP	1970-11-30 / 1971-03-20	96	7747-7842	IDW10
87	Perils of Pierre		JP	1971-03-22 / 1971-06-26	84	7843-7926	IDW10
88	Revival		JP	1971-06-28 / 1971-09-18	72	7927-7998	IDW10
89	Precognition Peril		JP	1971-09-20 / 1972-01-29	114	7999-8112	IDW10
90	Paragon of Vice		JP	1972-01-31 / 1972-06-10	114	8113-8226	IDW10
91	The Counterfeit Countessa		JP	1972-06-12 / 1972-10-21	114	8227-8340	IDW10
92	Case of the Mixed-up Missive		JP	1972-10-23 / 1973-01-20	78	8341-8418	IDW10
93	Danger in the Devil's Frying Pan		JP	1973-01-22 / 1973-05-26	108	8419-8526	IDW11
94	Secret of the Shark		JP	1973-05-28 / 1973-08-11	66	8527-8592	IDW11
95	Tomb Terror		JP	1973-08-13 / 1974-01-05	126	8593-8718	IDW11
96	Royal Double		JP	1974-01-07 / 1974-04-06	78	8719-8796	IDW11
97	House of Mystery		JP	1974-04-08 / 1974-06-29	72	8797-8868	IDW11
98	Ghost Ship		JP	1974-07-01 / 1974-09-07	60	8869-8928	IDW11
99	Conning the Con		JP	1974-09-09 / 1974-11-30	72	8929-9000	IDW11
100	The Pillars of Destiny		JP	1974-12-02 / 1975-02-22	72	9001-9072	IDW11
101	The Rebel Queen		JP	1975-02-24 / 1975-04-05	36	9073-9108	IDW11
102	Mangler's Big Heist		JP	1975-04-07 / 1975-06-28	72	9109-9180	IDW11
103	The Power		JP	1975-06-30 / 1975-10-11	90	9181-9270	IDW11
104	The Hades Hexagon		JP	1975-10-13 / 1975-12-20	60	9271-9330	
105	The Monkey's Secret		JP	1975-12-22 / 1976-02-28	60	9331-9390	
106	The Cherub Locket		JP	1976-03-01 / 1976-06-05	84	9391-9474	
107	Lost Empire		JP	1976-06-07 / 1976-10-09	108	9475-9582	
108	Lethal Letters		JP	1976-10-11 / 1977-01-08	78	9583-9660	
109	Manhunt		JP	1977-01-10 / 1977-03-26	66	9661-9726	
110	Macho Mayhem		JP	1977-03-28 / 1977-06-25	78	9727-9804	
111	Return of Dr. Destiny		JP	1977-06-27 / 1977-09-24	78	9805-9882	
112	Cat Burglar		JP	1977-09-26 / 1977-12-03	60	9883-9942	
113	The Death Cave		JP	1977-12-05 / 1978-02-18	66	9943-10008	
114	Madam Casino and Joe Rimfire		JP	1978-02-20 / 1978-04-22	54	10009-10062	
115	The Hunt for Cinderella		JP	1978-04-24 / 1978-08-05	90	10063-10152	
116	The Shark and the Treasure		JP	1978-08-07 / 1978-11-04	78	10153-10230	
117	Dirty Business		JP	1978-11-06 / 1979-02-03	78	10231-10308	
118	The Return of Mangler		JP	1979-02-05 / 1979-06-09	108	10309-10416	
119	Dangerous Eyes		JP	1979-06-11 / 1979-08-18	60	10417-10476	
120	The Imposter		JP	1979-08-20 / 1979-11-10	72	10477-10548	
121	Kidders Treasure		JP	1979-11-12 / 1980-02-23	90	10549-10638	
122	Back to Harmony		JP	1980-02-25 / 1980-06-28	108	10639-10746	
123	Kidnapped		JP	1980-06-30 / 1980-11-01	108	10747-10854	
124	The Tiger Hunt		JP	1980-11-03 / 1981-01-24	72	10855-10926	
125	The Gold Curse		JP	1981-01-26 / 1981-05-16	96	10927-11022	
126	Desmond on the Run		JP	1981-05-18 / 1981-09-05	96	11023-11118	
127	The Narkobarons Castle		JP	1981-09-07 / 1981-12-12	84	11119-11202	
128	Gold from Heaven		JP	1981-12-14 / 1982-03-06	72	11203-11274	
129	The Pickpocket		JP	1982-03-08 / 1982-06-05	78	11275-11352	
130	The Stuntman		JP	1982-06-07 / 1982-10-09	108	11353-11460	
131	The Sea of Death		JP	1982-10-11 / 1983-02-05	102	11461-11562	
132	The Scorpion		JP	1983-02-07 / 1983-05-28	96	11563-11658	
133	Casinoville		JP	1983-05-30 / 1983-09-17	96	11659-11754	
134	The Star of Zanzibar		JP	1983-09-19 / 1983-12-03	66	11755-11820	
135	The Ghost Ship		JP	1983-12-05 / 1984-02-25	72	11821-11892	
136	The Princess of Xyman		JP	1984-02-27 / 1984-06-30	108	11893-12000	
137	Honeys Heritage		JP	1984-07-02 / 1984-11-10	114	12001-12114	
138	Desmond Pickpocket Again		JP	1984-11-12 / 1985-02-09	78	12115-12192	
139	The Malkuk Indians		JP	1985-02-11 / 1985-04-13	54	12193-12246	
140	Maggie the Magpie		JP	1985-04-15 / 1985-06-22	60	12247-12306	
141	Mangler Back in Action		JP	1985-06-24 / 1985-10-12	96	12307-12402	
142	Return to Harmony		JP	1985-10-14 / 1986-02-22	114	12403-12516	
143	Zadan the Sorcerer		JP	1986-02-24 / 1986-05-24	78	12517-12594	
144	The Ghost of the Castle		JP	1986-05-26 / 1986-09-06	90	12595-12684	
145	The Chiing Urn		JP	1986-09-08 / 1986-11-22	66	12685-12750	
146	Honeys Uncle		JP	1986-11-24 / 1987-02-07	66	12751-12816	
147	Money and Power		JP	1987-02-09 / 1987-04-25	66	12817-12882	
148	Trip through the Amazon		JP	1987-04-27 / 1987-07-25	78	12883-12960	
149	Omega 9 Project		JP	1987-07-27 / 1987-10-24	78	12961-13038	
150	Plot in Alibar		JP	1987-10-26 / 1988-01-23	78	13039-13116	
151	Drug Trafficking with Homicide		JP	1988-01-25 / 1988-04-23	78	13117-13194	
152	The Scorpio Case		JP	1988-04-25 / 1988-07-16	72	13195-13266	
153	The Ecologist		JP	1988-07-18 / 1988-11-05	96	13267-13362	
154	Engagement Party		JP	1988-11-07 / 1989-02-04	78	13363-13440	
155	The Secret of the New Atlantis		JP	1989-02-06 / 1989-04-29	72	13441-13512	
156	Chain Attack		JP	1989-05-01 / 1989-08-05	84	13513-13596	
157	Tommy's Escape		JP	1989-08-07 / 1989-10-21	66	13597-13662	
158	Final Scene		JP	1989-10-23 / 1990-01-20	78	13663-13740	
159	The Big Boy Problem		JP	1990-01-22 / 1990-04-14	72	13741-13812	
160	The Mystery of the Floppy Disk		JP	1990-04-16 / 1990-07-14	78	13813-13890	
161	Little Doris		JP	1990-07-16 / 1990-11-10	102	13891-13992	
162	The Bodyguard		JP	1990-11-12 / 1991-02-16	84	13993-14076	
163	The Simsby Sapphire		JP	1991-02-18 / 1991-06-01	90	14077-14166	
164	The Treasure of the Galleon		JP	1991-06-03 / 1991-08-17	66	14167-14232	
165	Illegal Hunting		JP	1991-08-19 / 1991-10-26	60	14233-14292	
166	Straw Dreams		JP	1991-10-28 / 1992-02-01	84	14293-14376	
167	The Crazy Sage		JP	1992-02-03 / 1992-05-02	78	14377-14454	
168	The Missing Briefcase		JP	1992-05-04 / 1992-07-18	66	14455-14520	
169	The Former Ambassador		JP	1992-07-20 / 1992-08-29	36	14521-14556	
170	The Haunted House		JP	1992-08-31 / 1992-12-19	96	14557-14652	
171	Advertising Assassination		JP	1992-12-21 / 1993-03-06	66	14653-14718	
172	The Hidden Treasure		JP	1993-03-08 / 1993-07-03	102	14719-14820	
173	Theft of Songs		JP	1993-07-05 / 1993-08-28	48	14821-14868	
174	The Perfect Alibi		JP	1993-08-30 / 1993-11-27	78	14869-14946	
175	A Unique Case		JP	1993-11-29 / 1994-01-29	54	14947-15000	
176	The Abduction of Dust		JP	1994-01-31 / 1994-06-04	108	15001-15108	
177	The Sword of Malcolm Mac Doodle		JP	1994-06-06 / 1994-07-23	42	15109-15150	
178	Export of Stolen Cars		JP	1994-07-25 / 1994-10-22	78	15151-15228	
179	The Great Detective		JP	1994-10-24 / 1994-12-24	54	15229-15282	
180	Dangerous Relations		JP	1994-12-26 / 1995-04-08	90	15283-15372	
181	Curtis Bangs The great Patriot		JP	1995-04-10 / 1995-07-22	90	15373-15462	
182	The Resort Jewel Thief		JP	1995-07-24 / 1995-10-28	84	15463-15546	
183	The Judge Clark Records		JP	1995-10-30 / 1996-01-20	72	15547-15618	
184	Mangler and the Inheritance		JP	1996-01-22 / 1996-05-04	90	15619-15708	
185	Donny the Duke Coyle		JP	1996-05-06 / 1996-08-10	84	15709-15792	
186	Identical Twins		JP	1996-08-12 / 1996-10-12	54	15793-15846	
187	The Mine		JP	1996-10-14 / 1997-01-18	84	15847-15930	
188	The Celebrity		JP	1997-01-20 / 1997-03-08	42	15931-15972	
189	Lord Desmond, Earl of Ffagan		JP	1997-03-10 / 1997-06-21	90	15973-16062	
190	Fishing in Alaska		JP	1997-06-23 / 1997-08-30	60	16063-16122	
191	Enid Townsend Will		JP	1997-09-01 / 1997-12-13	90	16123-16212	
192	Pagan Lee in Trouble		JP	1997-12-15 / 1998-02-28	66	16213-16278	
193	The Mob Guy		JP	1998-03-02 / 1998-06-13	90	16279-16368	
194	The Desmond Clan		JP	1998-06-15 / 1998-08-08	48	16369-16416	
195	Mangler's Daughter		JP	1998-08-10 / 1998-12-19	114	16417-16530	
196	Princess Leila of Tanga		JP	1998-12-21 / 1999-02-27	60	16531-16590	
197	Last Case	JP	JP&FB	1999-03-01 / 1999-06-26	102	16591-16692	
