= Alley Baggett =

American glamour model

- Born: July 14, 1973 (age 53); Houston, Texas, U.S.
- Children: 1
- Modeling information
- Height: 5 ft 0 in (1.52 m)
- Hair color: Brown
- Eye color: Grey
- Website: http://www.alleybaggett.net/

Alley Baggett (born July 14, 1973) is an American glamour model and makeup artist.

She appeared on the cover of Playboy's Book of Lingerie in the March/April 1996 issue. She has since appeared on more than twelve Playboy Special Edition covers. She has also been featured in British lad mags FHM and Loaded.

== Early life ==
Baggett was born and raised in Houston, Texas, to parents of Spanish descent. She originally had aspirations of becoming a dancer on Broadway and settled in New York, during this time Baggett did jobs such as a cocktail waitress.

== Career ==
Outside of the modeling realm, Baggett has worked on television as a WWF Sunday Night Heat commentator on the USA Network and has appeared on Penn and Teller's Sin City Spectacular, the WB's Unhappily Ever After, Telemundo's The Umberto Show and the Maria Conchita Alonso Show. She has also performed in music videos for Ricky Martin's "Shake Your Bon-Bon" and Third Eye Blind's "Never Let You Go". Baggett was featured in a comic book series based on a crime fighting alter-ego, Alley Cat. She has also appeared in various car tuning magazines.

== Personal life ==
At age fifteen Baggett got married and had a child.
