= Steve McMichael =

American football player and wrestler (1957–2025)

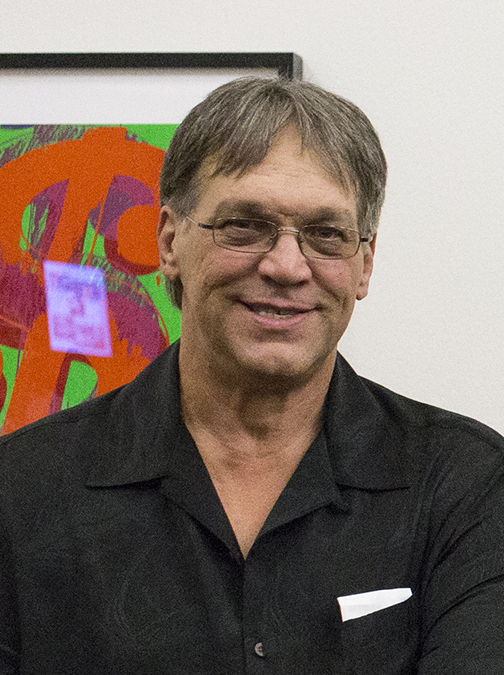
- McMichael in 2016

No. 66, 76, 90
- Position: Defensive tackle

Personal information
- Born: October 17, 1957; Houston, Texas, U.S.
- Died: April 23, 2025 (aged 67); Joliet, Illinois, U.S.
- Listed height: 6 ft 2 in (1.88 m)
- Listed weight: 270 lb (122 kg)

Career information
- High school: Freer (Freer, Texas)
- College: Texas (1975–1980)
- NFL draft: 1980: 3rd round, 73rd overall pick

Career history

Playing
- New England Patriots (1980); Chicago Bears (1981–1993); Green Bay Packers (1994)

Coaching
- Chicago Slaughter (2007–2013) Head coach

Awards and highlights
- As a player: Super Bowl champion (XX); 2× First-team All-Pro (1985, 1987); 2× Second-team All-Pro (1986, 1991); 2× Pro Bowl (1986, 1987); Top 100 greatest Bears of All-Time; Chicago Bears All-Time Team; Unanimous All-American (1979); 2× First-team All-SWC (1978, 1979); Second-team All-SWC (1977); As a coach: CIFL champion (2009)

Career NFL statistics
- Total tackles: 849
- Sacks: 95
- Safeties: 3
- Forced fumbles: 16
- Fumble recoveries: 17
- Interceptions: 3
- Stats at Pro Football Reference

Head coaching record
- Regular season: 58–34 (.630)
- Postseason: 4–4 (.500)
- Career: 62–38 (.620)
- Pro Football Hall of Fame
- College Football Hall of Fame

Stephen Douglas McMichael (October 17, 1957 – April 23, 2025), nicknamed "Mongo", "Ming", and "Ming the Merciless", was an American professional football player and professional wrestler. He was a defensive tackle for 15 seasons in the National Football League (NFL), primarily for the Chicago Bears. He played college football for the Texas Longhorns and was selected by the New England Patriots in the 1980 NFL draft. After retiring from playing football, he wrestled in World Championship Wrestling (WCW) and was part of The Four Horsemen stable.

While playing for the Bears, he was a two-time Pro Bowler and four-time All-Pro, winning Super Bowl XX with the team. He ended his football career with the Green Bay Packers, before making appearances for the World Wrestling Federation (WWF) ahead of WrestleMania XI.

In World Championship Wrestling (WCW), he started off as a color commentator before ultimately obtaining a career as a professional wrestler. He would be a member of the Four Horsemen stable and was a one time WCW United States Heavyweight Champion. Before retiring from public appearances, McMichael was a regular presence on Chicago sports radio and was the namesake of a restaurant in the southwest suburbs of Chicago.

From 2007 to 2013, McMichael was the head coach of the Chicago Slaughter of the Continental Indoor Football League (CIFL). He ran unsuccessfully for mayor of Romeoville, Illinois southwest of Chicago. In 2021, he was diagnosed with amyotrophic lateral sclerosis (ALS). McMichael was inducted into the Pro Football Hall of Fame in 2024. On April 23, 2025, McMichael was moved into hospice care. After transitioning into hospice care, McMichael died the same day at 67.

== Early life ==
McMichael was born on October 17, 1957, in Houston. His parents separated before his second birthday, and his mother later remarried E.V. McMichael, an oil company executive whose surname McMichael adopted; his surname at birth has not been publicly reported. He had four siblings: older brothers John and Richard, and younger sisters Kathy and Sharon. The family moved to Freer, south of San Antonio, and he attended Freer High School. In his senior year, he lettered in six sports: football, basketball, baseball, track, tennis, and golf. Baseball was his preferred sport, and whilst playing as a catcher, he batted .450 in his senior year, garnering attention from the St. Louis Cardinals and Cincinnati Reds.

== College career ==
McMichael's accomplishments in football led to him being offered scholarships by 75 colleges and universities. He chose to go to the University of Texas at Austin. He played as a defensive tackle for the Texas Longhorns football team from 1976 to 1979, but his freshman season was marred by the death of his stepfather. In his senior season, he was a consensus first-team All-American, and he was defensive MVP at the 1979 Hula Bowl in Halawa, Hawaii. During his time playing at Texas he was an All-Southwest conference choice in 1978 and 1979, the team MVP in 1979 and the backup place kicker in 1977. In 1979 he was inducted into the Longhorn Hall of Honor.

On July 17, 2010, McMichael was inducted into the College Football Hall of Fame.

== Professional football career ==
Selected in the third round (73rd overall) of the 1980 NFL draft by the New England Patriots, McMichael was cut before his second season in 1981, then was signed by the Chicago Bears as a free agent. He became one of their starting defensive tackles and helped them to a Super Bowl win in 1985. He had a streak of 101 games started until 1990, when his playing time was reduced. He led the Bears with 11 1/2 sacks in 1988. He had 108 tackles in 1989. McMichael was named to the NFC's Pro Bowl teams for the 1986 and 1987 seasons.

In a 1991 game against the New York Jets, with the Bears down 13–6 with 1:54 remaining, McMichael forced a Blair Thomas fumble and recovered it at the New York 36. Quarterback Jim Harbaugh then threw a game-tying touchdown to Neal Anderson with :18 left in the game. The Bears went on to win in overtime when Harbaugh scored on a one yard TD run. Bears coach Mike Ditka said in 2005 that McMichael was the toughest player he had ever coached. He played with the Green Bay Packers in 1994 before retiring. Aside from his "Mongo" moniker, McMichael was also nicknamed "Ming the Merciless", or "Ming" for short.

"Thank God New England got rid of me. Some teams, they want you to have a certain image. Other teams, like this one, they just want you to get down and dirty. I'm really proud to be a Bear. The Patriots, yeah, they thought I was a little weird. And I guess I am. But here they don't care, long as you play hard. The town, the coach, the team — it's Steve McMichael. I wouldn't want to be anywhere else."

— McMichael in 1984, speaking to the Chicago Tribune's Bob Verdi

"For 13 years, I helped the Bears beat the Packers every year. I whupped their ass, right? So the last year, I went up there on my last leg and I wasn't any good anymore. So I stole their money and whipped their ass again!"

— McMichael in 2019, speaking about his sole season with the Green Bay Packers

In August 2023, he was named a finalist for the Seniors ballot of the Pro Football Hall of Fame for the class of 2024. He had previously been nominated in 2014 and 2015. On February 8, 2024, McMichael was officially selected to be inducted into the Hall of Fame. He was formally inducted on August 3, 2024, with his sister Kathy delivering a speech on his behalf. Members of the 1985 Bears, including "Samurai" Mike Singletary, Jimbo Covert and Richard Dent, traveled to his home to share the celebration with him. Walter Payton's son Jarrett would be the one who inducted McMichael into the NFL Hall of Fame.

== Professional wrestling career ==
Steve McMichael
Professional wrestling career
- Ring name: Steve McMichael
- Billed height: 6 ft 2 in (188 cm)
- Billed weight: 270 lb (122 kg)
- Trained by: Terry Taylor
- Debut: September 2, 1995
- Retired: March 6, 1999

=== World Wrestling Federation (1995) ===
Following the conclusion of his NFL career, McMichael appeared at ringside for Lawrence Taylor during WrestleMania XI on April 2, 1995, in Hartford, Connecticut. Taylor competed against Bam Bam Bigelow, and several football players were present at ringside to prevent interference from other wrestlers. On the March 20, 1995, episode of Monday Night Raw, McMichael provided guest commentary alongside Vince McMahon. During the broadcast, he became involved in a brawl with Kama Mustafa, an associate of Bigelow. The altercation spilled across the arena floor, knocking over the broadcast table before being broken up by event staff. Taylor ultimately defeated Bigelow in their match at WrestleMania XI.

=== World Championship Wrestling (1995–1999) ===
==== Color commentator (1995–1996) ====
In 1995, McMichael was hired by World Championship Wrestling (WCW). On September 4, 1995, he made his debut with the company as the pro-babyface color commentator on the premiere of WCW Monday Nitro, with Bobby Heenan fulfilling his typical pro-heel commentator role alongside lead broadcaster Eric Bischoff. McMichael would root for the popular wrestlers during matches, would bicker with Heenan on a regular basis, and brought his dog Pepe with him to the broadcast booth.

==== The Four Horsemen (1996–1997) ====
In April 1996, Ric Flair started hitting on McMichael's wife Debra, who sat at ringside during WCW Monday Nitro. McMichael challenged Flair and Arn Anderson to a match with his partner Kevin Greene. He trained with Randy Savage (he was actually trained by Terry Taylor at the WCW Power Plant), while Flair and Anderson got Heenan to be their coach for the match. It was held at The Great American Bash. During the match, Debra and Greene's wife were chased to the back by Woman and Miss Elizabeth, who were Flair's valets. Debra came back with Woman and Elizabeth, and she had a briefcase full of money and a Four Horsemen T-shirt. McMichael accepted it and hit Greene in the head with the briefcase. McMichael's first singles match was against Joe Gomez at Bash at the Beach.

He then feuded with the Dungeon of Doom with the other Horsemen, and he had problems with Jeff Jarrett over the affections of Debra in late 1996 through early 1997. Woman trashed Debra, causing McMichael and Chris Benoit to step in each time. The turning point in the McMichael–Jarrett feud was at SuperBrawl VII. McMichael wrestled Jarrett, and if Jarrett won, he was an official Horseman. Debra interfered for Jarrett, so he would win. Then McMichael and Jarrett had to team, and they bickered at first but later became a solid tag team. McMichael wrestled two football players in 1997. He beat Reggie White at Slamboree and lost to Kevin Greene at The Great American Bash, which saw McMichael slapped by Greene's mother at ringside.

In July 1997, Jarrett was kicked out of the Horsemen, and Debra soon left McMichael for Jarrett. McMichael got his revenge when he defeated Jarrett for his WCW United States Heavyweight Championship on the August 21 episode of Clash of the Champions XXXV. Weeks earlier, Arn Anderson had been forced to retire due to an injury, and Curt Hennig joined the Horsemen. At Fall Brawl, Hennig turned on the Horsemen and joined the nWo, during the War Games match in which the Horsemen were involved. McMichael was handcuffed to the steel cage surrounding the ring along with Benoit, and neither man could defend Flair from the 5-on-1 assault from the nWo; the match ended after McMichael surrendered to stop the nWo from attacking Flair, although Hennig would still slam the cage door on Flair's head (which was edited out of the home video release, but included on the WWE Network in full), even after the submission was made. The next night on Nitro, McMichael dropped his United States title to Hennig, and Flair disbanded the Horsemen.

==== Various rivalries and departure (1997–1999) ====
McMichael went after Debra's stable of wrestlers which included Jarrett, Eddie Guerrero and Alex Wright. Debra hired Goldberg to get McMichael, and he became one of Goldberg's first victims in November 1997. Goldberg stole McMichael's Super Bowl ring and weeks later McMichael hit Goldberg with a pipe and reclaimed it. He briefly helped Benoit feud with Raven's Flock in January 1998 and then got into a feud with The British Bulldog, in which he broke his hand during a match at SuperBrawl VIII in February 1998.

McMichael returned in June 1998 and had a feud with Stevie Ray and helped reform the Four Horsemen in October with Flair, Benoit, Dean Malenko and manager Arn Anderson. They feuded with the nWo until McMichael made his final TV appearance on the February 8, 1999, episode of Nitro. His last match was on March 6, 1999, teaming with Chris Benoit and Dean Malenko defeating Curt Hennig, Barry Windham and Wrath on a house show.

=== Total Nonstop Action Wrestling (2008) ===
McMichael returned to professional wrestling for Total Nonstop Action Wrestling's flagship pay-per-view, Bound For Glory, where he refereed the Monster's Ball Match. This match was notable for McMichael's extremely slow cadence for a three count.

== Other endeavors ==
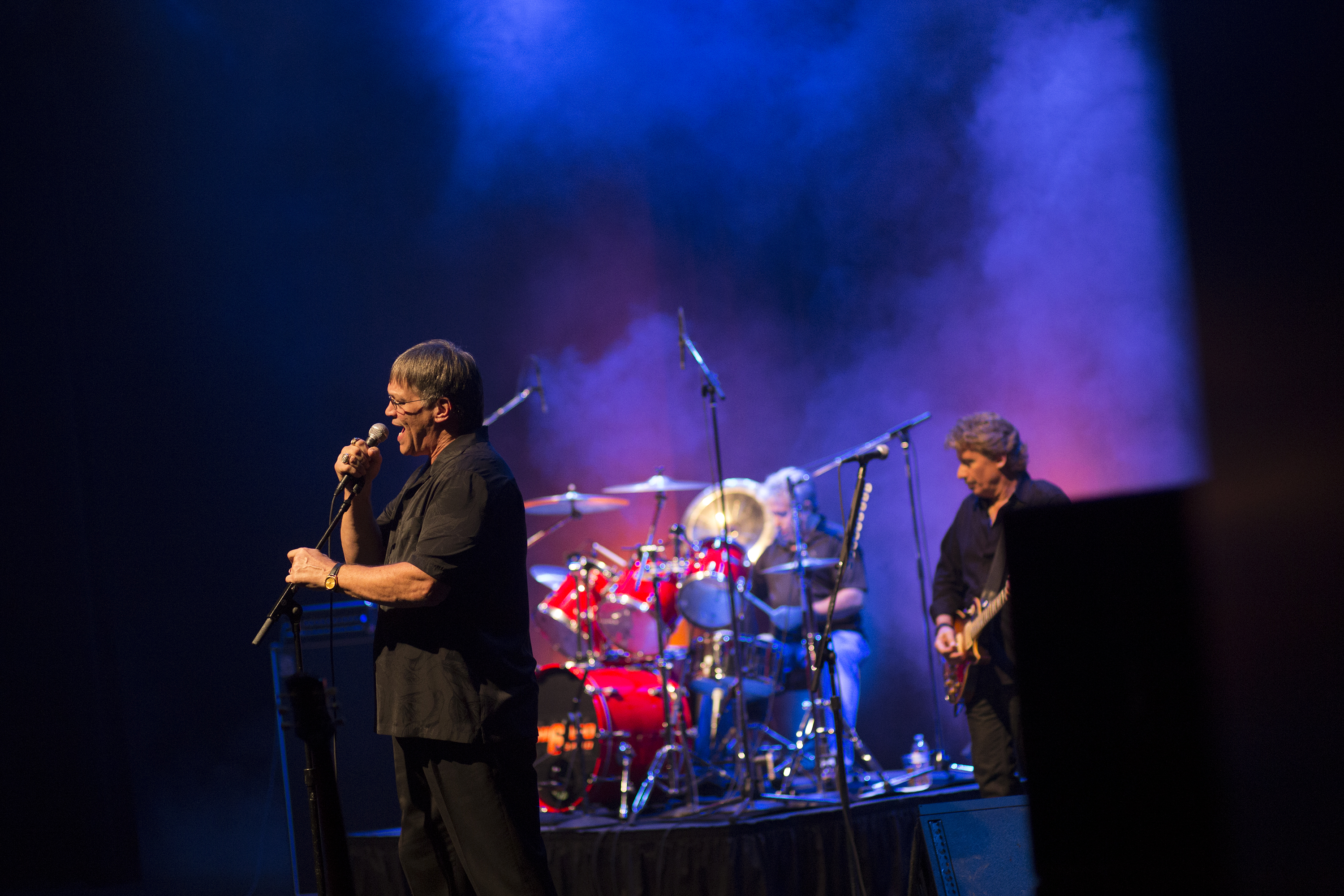
McMichael singing with the Chicago 6 Band in September 2016

McMichael co-hosted a Bears pre-game show with Jeff Dickerson on ESPN 1000 in Chicago. He was the head coach of the Chicago Slaughter of the Indoor Football League from 2007 until the team's final season in 2013.

McMichael and fellow 1985 Chicago Bears alumni Dan Hampton and Otis Wilson performed in a rock and roll oldies band (with entertaining satirical Mike Ditka verses) called the Chicago 6.

On August 7, 2001, during the seventh-inning stretch of a game between the Chicago Cubs and the Colorado Rockies at Wrigley Field, McMichael, who was visiting the Cubs television booth, took a turn as the guest singer for "Take Me Out to the Ball Game". Earlier in the game in the bottom of the 6th inning, home plate umpire Ángel Hernández had controversially called Cubs infielder Ron Coomer out at the plate. Before singing Take Me Out to the Ball Game, McMichael announced to those in attendance over the PA system that he would "have some speaks" with Hernández after the game, presumably as a result of Hernández's call on Coomer. Crew chief Randy Marsh ordered McMichael to be ejected from the ballpark, and the umpires later received an apology for McMichael's conduct from then-Cubs general manager Andy MacPhail.

On August 16, 2012, McMichael announced his intentions to run for mayor of Romeoville, Illinois. He lost the race to incumbent John Noak, garnering 39 percent of the vote.

== Personal life and death ==
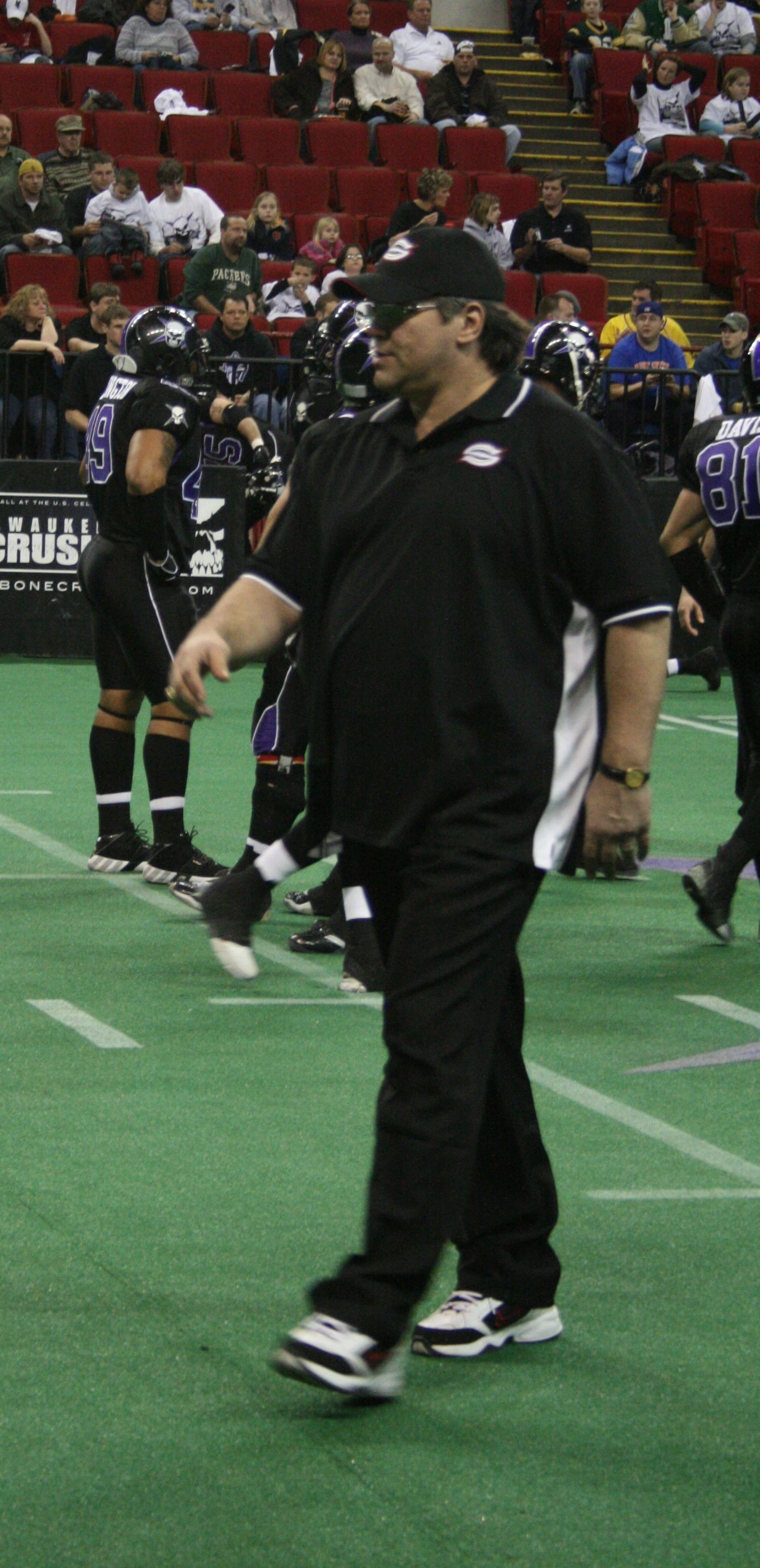
McMichael at a Chicago Slaughter football game in March 2008

In 1985, McMichael married Debra Marshall. They divorced in 1998. McMichael married Misty Davenport on March 24, 2001. Their daughter, Macy Dale, was born in 2008. A year after McMichael’s death, Davenport was arrested on February 20, 2026 for a misdemeanor count of domestic battery.

On April 23, 2021, McMichael announced that he had been diagnosed with amyotrophic lateral sclerosis (ALS). The Les Turner ALS Foundation awarded McMichael the ALS Courage Award on September 18, 2021. McMichael was transferred to hospice care in Joliet, Illinois, southwest of Chicago, on April 23, 2025, and died later that day due to complications from ALS, at the age of 67. In April 2026, McMichael was posthumously diagnosed with chronic traumatic encephalopathy.

Jarrett Payton would be among those who paid tribute. In his X tribute, fellow member of the Four Horsemen Ric Flair referred to McMichael as "my best friend through it all." All Elite Wrestling honored McMichael on an episode of AEW Collision, in a tribute which featured Flair, Dean Malenko, and his wife Misty.

== Championships and accomplishments ==
=== American football ===
- National Football League
  - Super Bowl XX champion (with the Chicago Bears)
  - Two-time First-team All-Pro (1985, 1987)
  - Two-time Pro Bowl selection (1986, 1987)
  - Gridiron Greats Hall of Fame inductee (class of 2019)
  - Professional Football Hall of Fame (class of 2024)
- National Collegiate Athletic Association
  - 1979 All-American
  - College Football Hall of Fame inductee (class of 2009)

=== Professional wrestling ===
- World Championship Wrestling
  - WCW United States Heavyweight Championship (1997)
- Wrestling Observer Newsletter
  - Worst Television Announcer (1996)
  - Shad Gaspard/Jon Huber Memorial Award (2023)

== See also ==
- List of gridiron football players who became professional wrestlers
- List of NFL players with chronic traumatic encephalopathy
