= Freer, Texas =

- City
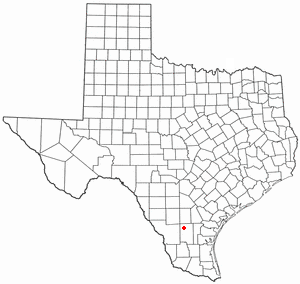
- Location of Freer, Texas

- Coordinates: 27°52′45″N 98°36′58″W
- Country: United States
- State: Texas
- County: Duval

Area
  - Total: 4.14 sq mi (10.71 km^{2})
  - Land: 4.12 sq mi (10.68 km^{2})
  - Water: 0.012 sq mi (0.03 km^{2})
- Elevation: 518 ft (158 m)

Population (2020)
  - Total: 2,461
  - Density: 596.8/sq mi (230.4/km^{2})
- Time zone: UTC-6 (Central (CST))
  - Summer (DST): UTC-5 (CDT)
- ZIP code: 78357
- Area code: 361
- FIPS code: 48-27432
- GNIS feature ID: 2410544
- Website: www.freertx.org

Freer is a city in Duval County, Texas, United States. Its population was 2,461 at the 2020 census.

== Geography ==
Freer is located in northwestern Duval County at 27°52′45″N 98°36′58″W (27.879156, –98.616237). U.S. Route 59 passes east–west through the city as Riley Street. Once outside the city limits, US 59 leads northeast 68 miles (109 km) to Beeville and southwest 59 miles (95 km) to Laredo. Texas State Highway 16 (Norton Avenue) crosses US 59 in the center of town and leads north 111 miles (179 km) to San Antonio and southwest 92 miles (148 km) to Zapata on the Rio Grande. Texas State Highway 44 passes through the center of Freer on Riley Street with US 59, but leads east 25 miles (40 km) to San Diego, the Duval County seat, and 35 miles (56 km) to Alice, and west 47 miles (76 km) to Interstate 35 at Encinal.

According to the United States Census Bureau, Freer has a total area of 4.1 square miles (10.5 km^{2}), of which 0.012 sq mi (0.03 km^{2}), or 0.30%, is covered by water.

=== Climate ===
The climate in this area is characterized by hot, humid summers and generally mild to cool winters. According to the Köppen climate classification, Freer has a humid subtropical climate, Cfa on climate maps.

Climate data for Freer, Texas (1991–2020 normals, extremes 1962–2008, 2011–present)
Month	Jan	Feb	Mar	Apr	May	Jun	Jul	Aug	Sep	Oct	Nov	Dec	Year
Record high °F (°C)	95 (35)	101 (38)	103 (39)	107 (42)	111 (44)	116 (47)	110 (43)	111 (44)	112 (44)	102 (39)	99 (37)	96 (36)	116 (47)
Mean maximum °F (°C)	85.6 (29.8)	89.6 (32.0)	94.3 (34.6)	98.5 (36.9)	101.1 (38.4)	103.3 (39.6)	104.0 (40.0)	105.1 (40.6)	101.5 (38.6)	96.3 (35.7)	89.9 (32.2)	86.1 (30.1)	107.1 (41.7)
Mean daily maximum °F (°C)	66.2 (19.0)	71.2 (21.8)	77.7 (25.4)	84.4 (29.1)	90.7 (32.6)	94.8 (34.9)	97.3 (36.3)	98.4 (36.9)	92.0 (33.3)	85.3 (29.6)	75.1 (23.9)	67.8 (19.9)	83.4 (28.6)
Daily mean °F (°C)	54.7 (12.6)	59.6 (15.3)	66.1 (18.9)	72.2 (22.3)	79.1 (26.2)	83.6 (28.7)	85.5 (29.7)	85.9 (29.9)	80.5 (26.9)	73.6 (23.1)	63.8 (17.7)	56.5 (13.6)	71.8 (22.1)
Mean daily minimum °F (°C)	43.3 (6.3)	48.0 (8.9)	54.6 (12.6)	60.0 (15.6)	67.4 (19.7)	72.3 (22.4)	73.7 (23.2)	73.3 (22.9)	68.9 (20.5)	61.9 (16.6)	52.5 (11.4)	45.3 (7.4)	60.1 (15.6)
Mean minimum °F (°C)	28.6 (−1.9)	32.8 (0.4)	36.2 (2.3)	45.1 (7.3)	57.1 (13.9)	65.7 (18.7)	69.4 (20.8)	69.0 (20.6)	58.0 (14.4)	45.8 (7.7)	34.8 (1.6)	28.4 (−2.0)	25.5 (−3.6)
Record low °F (°C)	12 (−11)	14 (−10)	20 (−7)	35 (2)	41 (5)	54 (12)	60 (16)	58 (14)	43 (6)	36 (2)	20 (−7)	16 (−9)	12 (−11)
Average precipitation inches (mm)	1.25 (32)	1.31 (33)	1.92 (49)	2.08 (53)	2.80 (71)	3.07 (78)	2.44 (62)	2.45 (62)	3.35 (85)	1.82 (46)	1.42 (36)	1.24 (31)	25.15 (639)
Average snowfall inches (cm)	0.0 (0.0)	0.0 (0.0)	0.0 (0.0)	0.0 (0.0)	0.0 (0.0)	0.0 (0.0)	0.0 (0.0)	0.0 (0.0)	0.0 (0.0)	0.0 (0.0)	0.0 (0.0)	0.0 (0.0)	0.0 (0.0)
Average precipitation days (≥ 0.01 in)	3.3	4.2	4.0	3.6	3.9	4.4	2.8	3.0	5.7	3.4	2.9	3.9	45.1
Average snowy days (≥ 0.1 in)	0.0	0.0	0.0	0.0	0.0	0.0	0.0	0.0	0.0	0.0	0.0	0.0	0.0
Source: NOAA

== Demographics ==
Historical population
Census	Pop.	Note	%±
1940	2,346		—
1950	2,280		−2.8%
1960	2,734		19.9%
1970	2,804		2.6%
1980	3,213		14.6%
1990	3,271		1.8%
2000	3,241		−0.9%
2010	2,818		−13.1%
2020	2,461		−12.7%
U.S. Decennial Census

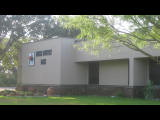
Brush Country Bank in Freer

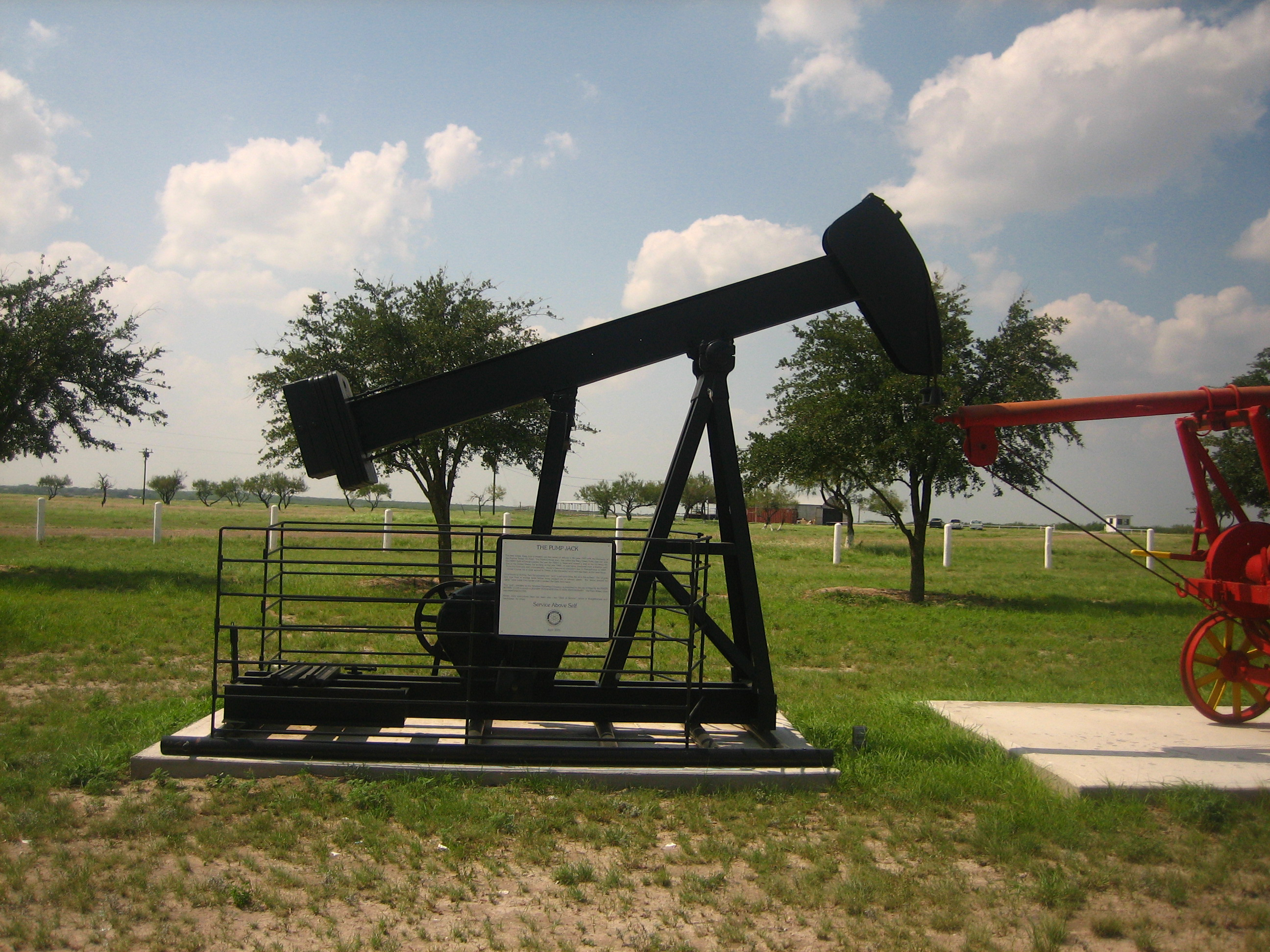
Oil well pump exhibit in Freer

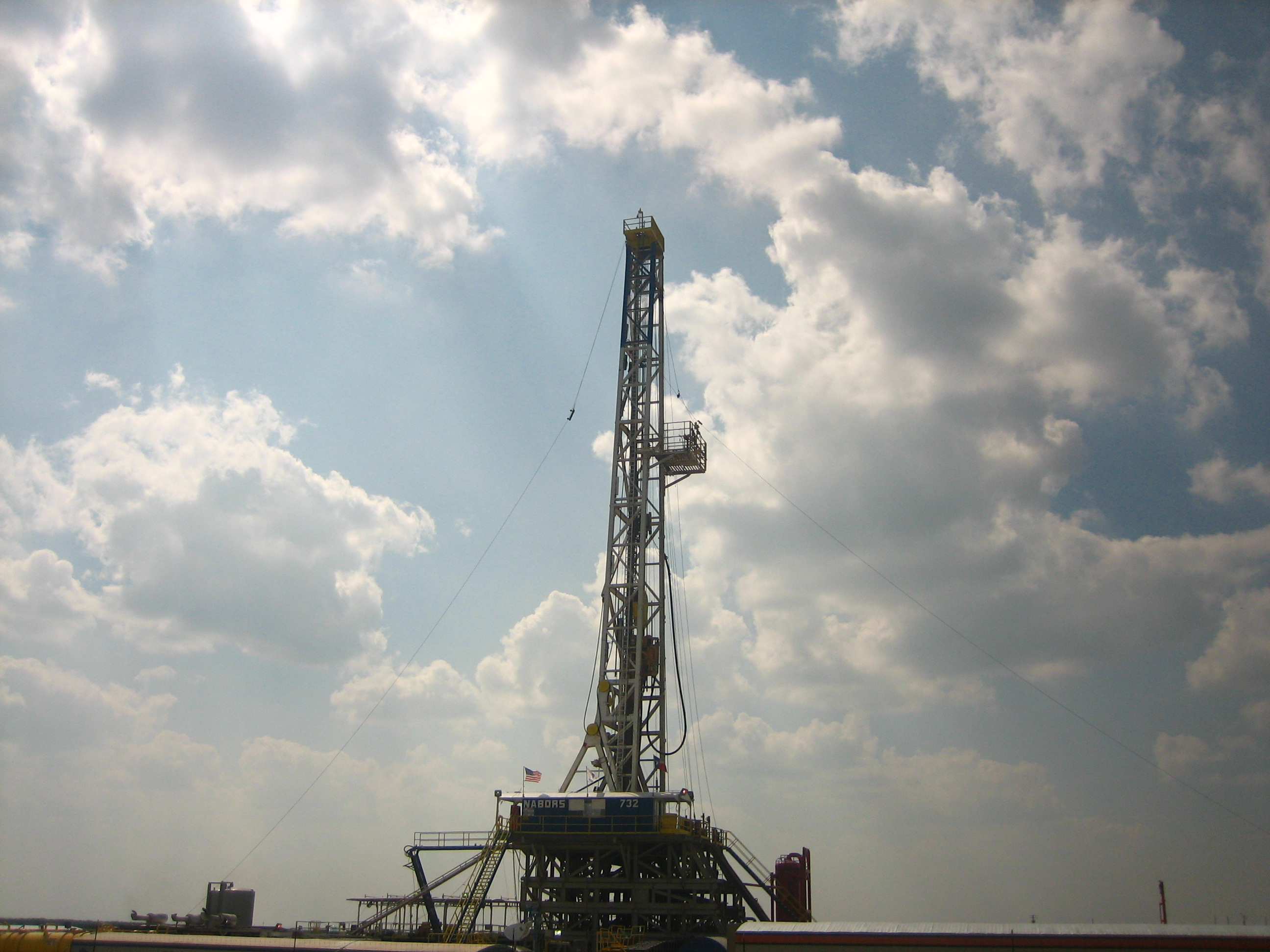
Modern oil derrick east of Freer off U.S. Route 59 (Future Interstate 69W)

=== 2020 census ===
As of the 2020 census, Freer had 2,461 people, 905 households, and 663 families residing in the city. The median age was 35.9 years; 27.8% of residents were under 18, and 16.8% were 65 or older. For every 100 females, there were 97.2 males, and for every 100 females 18 and over, there were 91.8 males 18 and over.

None of residents lived in urban areas, while 100.0% lived in rural areas.

Of the 905 households in Freer, 37.7% had children under 18 living in them, 41.8% were married-couple households, 21.1% were households with a male householder and no spouse or partner present, and 31.2% were households with a female householder and no spouse or partner present. About 28.0% of all households were made up of individuals and 12.6% had someone living alone who was 65 or older.

The city had 1,119 housing units, of which 19.1% were vacant. The homeowner vacancy rate was 1.2% and the rental vacancy rate was 19.0%.

Racial composition as of the 2020 census
Race	Number	Percent
White	1,325	53.8%
Black or African American	10	0.4%
American Indian and Alaska Native	17	0.7%
Asian	24	1.0%
Native Hawaiian and other Pacific Islander	0	0.0%
Some other race	259	10.5%
Two or more races	826	33.6%
Hispanic or Latino (of any race)	2,018	82.0%

=== 2000 census ===
As of the census of 2000, 3,241 people, 1,111 households, and 845 families resided in the city. The population density was 804.3 inhabitants per square mile (310.5/km^{2}). The 1,334 housing units had an average density of 331.1 per square mile (127.8/km^{2}). The racial makeup of the city was 80.59% White, 0.46% African American, 0.68% Native American, 0.25% Asian, 14.87% from other races, and 3.15% from two or more races. Hispanics or Latinos of any race were 77.38% of the population.

Of the 1,111 households, 42.0% had children under 18 living with them, 56.3% were married couples living together, 14.3% had a female householder with no husband present, and 23.9% were not families. About 21.5% of all households were made up of individuals, and 9.2% had someone living alone who was 65 or older. The average household size was 2.92, and the average family size was 3.40.

In the city, the age distribution was 33.1% under 18, 9.8% from 18 to 24, 26.3% from 25 to 44, 19.9% from 45 to 64, and 10.9% who were 65 or older. The median age was 30 years. For every 100 females, there were 95.9 males. For every 100 females age 18 and over, there were 96.2 males.

The median income in the city for a household was $25,078 and for a family was $26,475. Males had a median income of $26,789 versus $17,159 for females. The per capita income for the city was $11,457. About 18.4% of families and 21.6% of the population were below the poverty line, including 26.5% of those under 18 and 25.4% of those 65 or over.

== Education ==
The city is served by the Freer Independent School District.

== Notable people ==
- Jim Acker (b. 1958), a former Major League Baseball pitcher who played from 1983 to 1992, mostly with the Toronto Blue Jays
- Toni Adams (1964–2010), a professional wrestling manager and valet who appeared in several American regional promotions during the 1980s
- Steve McMichael (b. 1957), a former American football defensive tackle for Chicago Bears and former professional wrestler for WCW
- John Prentice, cartoonist and comic-book artist
- Paul Sadler (b. 1955), an attorney and Texas politician
- Buddy Temple (D) (1942–2015), a businessman and politician.

== Media ==
KBRA-FM radio at 95.9 MHz.
