= Lady and the Tramp II: Scamp's Adventure =

2001 American direct-to-video animated film

- Home video release poster
- Directed by: Darrell Rooney; Jeannine Roussel
- Screenplay by: Bill Motz; Bob Roth
- Produced by: Jeannine Roussel; David W. King; Cory Edwards
- Starring: Scott Wolf; Alyssa Milano; Chazz Palminteri; Jeff Bennett; Jodi Benson
- Edited by: Susan Edmunson
- Music by: Danny Troob
- Production company: Walt Disney Television Animation (Note: Animation services handled by Walt Disney Animation Australia)
- Distributed by: Buena Vista Home Entertainment (Note: Released by Walt Disney Home Video under the Walt Disney Pictures banner.)
- Release date: February 27, 2001
- Running time: 69 minutes
- Country: United States
- Language: English

Lady and the Tramp II: Scamp's Adventure is a 2001 American animated direct-to-video musical romantic comedy film produced by Walt Disney Television Animation, and the sequel to Disney's 1955 animated feature film Lady and the Tramp. The film was directed by Darrell Rooney and Jeannine Roussel, with a screenplay by Bill Motz and Bob Roth. It stars Scott Wolf as Lady and Tramp's son Scamp, who desires to become a wild dog. In the film, Scamp runs away from his home and joins a gang of stray dogs called the Junkyard Dogs, where he falls in love with one of the gang's members, Angel.

Lady and the Tramp II: Scamp's Adventure was released by Buena Vista Home Entertainment on February 27, 2001, to mixed reviews from critics.

== Plot ==
In 1912, Lady and Tramp raise three well-behaved daughters, Annette, Collette, and Danielle, and a rebellious son named Scamp. Dissatisfied with house rules, Scamp dreams of being a wild dog, which causes him to clash with his father, unaware that Tramp used to be a wild dog himself.

Two days before the Fourth of July, Scamp is sent outside after making a mess of his owners' house. He soon spots a pack of stray dogs, called the Junkyard Dogs, and becomes interested in joining them. Buster, the leader of the Junkyard Dogs, decides to give Scamp a skill test in order to prove his worth as a member of the gang.

Scamp is tasked with stealing a tin can from Reggie, a savage Bullmastiff. After being accidentally awakened, Reggie chases Scamp and Angel, a female member of the Junkyard Dogs. During the chase, Scamp and Angel are found by a local dogcatcher, who nearly catches Angel before Scamp rescues her. Reggie is subsequently caught by the dogcatcher. Although Scamp gains admiration from the Junkyard Dogs for his actions, Buster decides that Scamp needs another test before he can officially join the gang.

After the events, Scamp learns from the Junkyard Dogs about Tramp's past as a stray before he fell in love with Lady and became a house pet, which caused Buster, who was friends with Tramp, to feel betrayed. Shocked at discovering his father's past life, Scamp secretly questions why Tramp gave it all up.

That night, Scamp spends time with Angel and the two begin to fall in love. Angel confides in Scamp her wish to be adopted by a family and discovers that Scamp is the son of Tramp, whose family misses Scamp dearly. Despite finding out about how much his family cared about him, Scamp still insists on being a wild dog.

During the Fourth of July celebration the next day, Buster, having deduced that Scamp is Tramp's son, challenges Scamp to steal food from his family's picnic. Scamp manages to pull the stunt off, but Tramp confronts him. Tramp tries to convince Scamp to come home, but Buster's interference prompts Scamp to refuse.

Now accepted as a Junkyard Dog, Scamp embraces his newfound freedom, but Angel confronts Scamp for abandoning his family. In annoyance, Scamp inadvertently reveals Angel's desire to be a house dog to the other Junkyard Dogs, causing Angel to be kicked out of the group, and Scamp runs after Angel to apologize to her. Seeing this, Buster intentionally causes Scamp to get caught by the dogcatcher from earlier.

Scamp is sent to the pound, where he is placed in the same cell as a vengeful Reggie. Upon discovering Scamp's situation, Angel enlists the help of Tramp to rescue him. Tramp soon arrives at the pound, defeats Reggie, and rescues Scamp, who apologizes for running away and decides that his place is with his family. Inspired by Scamp's decision, the other Junkyard Dogs abandon Buster to find homes of their own. Scamp finally returns home, where his family decides to adopt Angel.

== Voice cast ==
- Scott Wolf as Scamp (or "Whirlwind" as Tramp calls him), Lady and Tramp's rambunctious teenage son who bears a strong resemblance to Tramp. Like his father, Scamp is a mixed-breed dog. He starts out as a playful, frisky, yet stubborn and selfish puppy, but has a total change of heart for his family after learning a lesson in humility, seeing that Buster betrayed him, as well as the fact that he suddenly realized he was not safe out there in the streets, and that his family loves him. Roger Bart provides his singing voice.
- Alyssa Milano as Angel, a Pomeranian/Siberian Husky dog who was once a pet and Scamp's love interest. She has a kind, yet spunky personality. At the end of the film, she is adopted by Jim Dear and Darling. She too bears a nickname for Scamp due to his inexperience with the streets, calling him "tenderfoot", which is another reason why she has a crush on him. Susan Egan provides her singing voice for select songs.
- Chazz Palminteri as Buster, a Rottweiler/Doberman Pinscher hybrid and the smug, sadistic and villainous leader of the Junkyard Dogs. He used to be the protégé of Tramp and is angry that Tramp left to become a house pet with Lady. He thus changes his motto after Tramp left to "Buster's trouble, is Buster's trouble". Jess Harnell provides his singing voice.
- Jeff Bennett as Tramp, a mongrel (with a mixture of a schnauzer and a terrier) and the father of Scamp, Annette, Collette, and Danielle. Tramp has become accustomed to living in a home during his time as a pet. He is portrayed as a loving, but firm and concerned father, and has an important role in this film. Nevertheless, he still has a few "street smarts" to fall back on, due to his near-old age.
  - Bennett also voices Trusty and Jock, a bloodhound and a Scottish Terrier who are the neighbors and friends of Lady and Tramp. They join Scamp's family in a search to find him.
  - Bennett also voices the Dogcatcher who chases after the Junkyard Dogs, determined to capture them.
- Jodi Benson as Lady (or "Pigeon/Pidge", which Tramp always calls her because of her naivety in the first film), an American Cocker Spaniel who is the mother of Scamp, Annette, Collette, and Danielle, and Tramp's mate. Due to her now being a mother of four, most of her naivety from the first film has been replaced with a sense of responsibility. She views Scamp's behavior in a more understanding light than Tramp does.
- Bill Fagerbakke as Mooch, an Old English Sheepdog who is fairly dim-witted but enthusiastic. He is seen playing with children at the end of the film.
- Mickey Rooney as Sparky, an Irish Wolfhound who used to know Tramp. He tells an inaccurate story about Tramp escaping from a group of dogcatchers, which ends with Tramp jumping down a ravine, never to be seen again.
- Cathy Moriarty as Ruby, an Afghan Hound who has a soft spot for puppies.
- Bronson Pinchot as Francois, a French Bulldog who speaks with a stereotypically French accent.
- Debi Derryberry and Kath Soucie as Annette, Collette and Danielle, three well-behaved and polite Cocker Spaniel puppies who are Scamp's sisters. They greatly resemble their mother Lady but each have different colored collars on their necks. They are prissy, love taking baths, and show no respect for Scamp, until the middle of the film when they actually start to miss him. Annette is blue collared, Collette is red collared with long ears, and Danielle is white collared. While they are at odds with Scamp at times, they do love him, due to the fact that he is their brother. Their names are not mentioned in the film, but in the end credits.
- Rob Paulsen as Otis, a Chinese Crested in the dog pound. His name is not mentioned in the film, but in the end credits.
- Nick Jameson and Barbara Goodson as Jim Dear and Darling, the owners of Lady, Tramp, Scamp, Annette, Collette, Danielle and by the end of this film, Angel.
- Andrew McDonough as Junior, Jim Dear and Darling's son and the youngest owner of Lady, Tramp, Scamp, Annette, Collette, Danielle and by the end of this film, Angel.
- Tress MacNeille as Aunt Sarah, Jim Dear's aunt, Darling's aunt-in-law, Junior's great aunt and the owner of Si and Am. She shows no respect for Scamp, believing him to be a "monster".
- Mary Kay Bergman and Tress MacNeille as Si and Am, Aunt Sarah's two sneaky Siamese cats. They have a much more minor appearance in this film than in the original. However, they are shown to have an unpleasant relationship with Scamp, just like in the comics with Scamp as protagonist. This was Bergman's final film role following her suicide in 1999.
- Jim Cummings as Tony, the owner and chef of Tony's.
- Michael Gough as Joe, Tony's assistant. Both he and Tony have only minor appearances in this film.
- Frank Welker as Reggie, an extremely vicious and very large bullmastiff/bulldog mix. He chases Scamp in a street, but gets caught by the dogcatcher, who unexpectedly sends him flying to a tomato stand. Later, he is chained when he attempts to kill Scamp, who is in the pound, but is fought off by Tramp. Reggie can be noticed because of his short tail and chipped canine.
- April Winchell as Mrs. Mahoney, a woman on the streets who wears a wig and carries around a poodle in a purse. On two occasions involving dog chases, she gets knocked over and her wigs get knocked off at the same time which publicly humiliates her. Of the two rounds in which this happens, she actually ends up completely losing the wig she had on in the first dog chase. Like Annette, Collette, Danielle and Otis, her name is not mentioned in the film, but in the end credits.

A non-speaking role includes Scratchy, a Scottish Deerhound who is plagued by fleas and fur loss. Scratchy was a member of the Junkyard Dogs until the end of the film, when all of the dogs decide to leave the junkyard to find their own homes and families.

== Production ==
In June 1998, Disney had announced a sequel to Lady and the Tramp was in development.

== Release ==
Lady and the Tramp II: Scamp's Adventure was released on February 27, 2001, three weeks after Disney opened Disney California Adventure. Disney re-released the film in the United States on DVD after the Platinum Edition DVD release of the first film on June 20, 2006. The Special Edition DVD went back into the Disney Vault on January 31, 2007. The film was re-released on DVD, and for the first time on Blu-ray on August 21, 2012. The Blu-ray/DVD combo pack went back into the Disney Vault on April 30, 2013.

== Reception ==
=== Critical reception ===
Lady and the Tramp II: Scamp's Adventure received mixed reviews from critics. On the review aggregator website Rotten Tomatoes, 45% of 11 critics' reviews are positive, with an average rating of 5.8/10.

Ben Simon of Animated Views wrote, "As direct-to-video sequels go, Lady and the Tramp II: Scamp's Adventure is better than average and families who love Lady and the Tramp should enjoy this entry from Disney. But it still has a direct-to-video feel, despite the care that the filmmakers took to create bridges to the original film." Common Sense Media gave the film three out of five stars, stating, "Not as good as the original, but cute and fun."

=== Accolades ===
The film received seven nominations and won one award. It received nominations from the International Animated Film Association (ASIFA) during the 29th Annie Awards in 2001, from DVD Exclusive during the 2001 DVD Exclusive Awards, and the Academy of Science Fiction, Fantasy & Horror Films during the 28th Saturn Awards in 2002. It won the Video Premiere Award in the 2001 DVD Exclusive Awards for Best Animated Character Performance for Scott Wolf as the speaking voice of Scamp.

Year	Ceremony	Award	Result
2001	29th Annie Awards	Outstanding Achievement in an Animated Home Video Production	Nominated
2001	29th Annie Awards	Outstanding Individual Achievement for Directing in an Animated Feature Production; Darrell Rooney; Jeannine Roussel	Nominated
2001	29th Annie Awards	Outstanding Individual Achievement for Voice Acting by a Female Performer in an Animated Feature Production; Jodi Benson (Lady)	Nominated
2001	29th Annie Awards	Outstanding Individual Achievement for Voice Acting by a Female Performer in an Animated Feature Production; Alyssa Milano (Angel)	Nominated
2001	Video Premiere Award; DVD Exclusive Awards	Best Animated Video Premiere Movie; Jeannine Roussel	Nominated
2001	Video Premiere Award; DVD Exclusive Awards	Best Original Song (A World Without Fences); Roger Bart (singer); Melissa Manchester (writer); Norman Gimbel (writer)	Nominated
2001	Video Premiere Award; DVD Exclusive Awards	Best Animated Character Performance; Scott Wolf (voice); Andrew Collins (supervising animator)	Won
2002	28th Saturn Awards	Best DVD Release	Nominated

== Soundtrack ==
Lady and the Tramp II: Scamp's Adventure

Soundtrack album by Various artists
- Released: 2001
- Recorded: 1999
- Genres: Pop, Classical
- Label: Walt Disney

Professional ratings
Review scores
Source	Rating
LetsSingIt	3/5 stars

The soundtrack of the film was released through Walt Disney Records. The score for it was mainly composed by Melissa Manchester and Norman Gimbel. But it was never released in stores for unknown reasons. The song Bella Notte from the original film is heard in the end credits sung by Joy Enriquez and Carlos Ponce.

=== Track listing ===
No.	Title	Writer(s)	Performer(s)	Length
1.	"Welcome Home"	Melissa Manchester and Norman Gimbel	Jodi Benson, Jeff Bennett, Jim Cummings, Michael Gough, Debi Derryberry, and Kath Soucie	3:02
2.	"World Without Fences"	Melissa Manchester and Norman Gimbel	Roger Bart	2:18
3.	"Junkyard Society Rag"	Melissa Manchester and Norman Gimbel	Jess Harnell, Bill Fagerbakke, Cathy Moriarty, Mickey Rooney, and Bronson Pinchot	3:13
4.	"I Didn't Know That I Could Feel This Way"	Melissa Manchester and Norman Gimbel	Roger Bart and Susan Egan	2:13
5.	"Always There"	Melissa Manchester and Norman Gimbel	Roger Bart, Jeff Bennett, Jodi Benson, and Susan Egan	2:19
6.	"Bella Notte (This is the Night)"	Sonny Burke and Peggy Lee	Joy Enriquez and Carlos Ponce	3:18
7.	"Welcome Home (Reprise)"	Danny Troob	Danny Troob, Brian Besterman, Martin Erskine, and Larry Hochman	0:32
Total length:				15:02
