= Scott Wolf =

American actor (b. 1968)

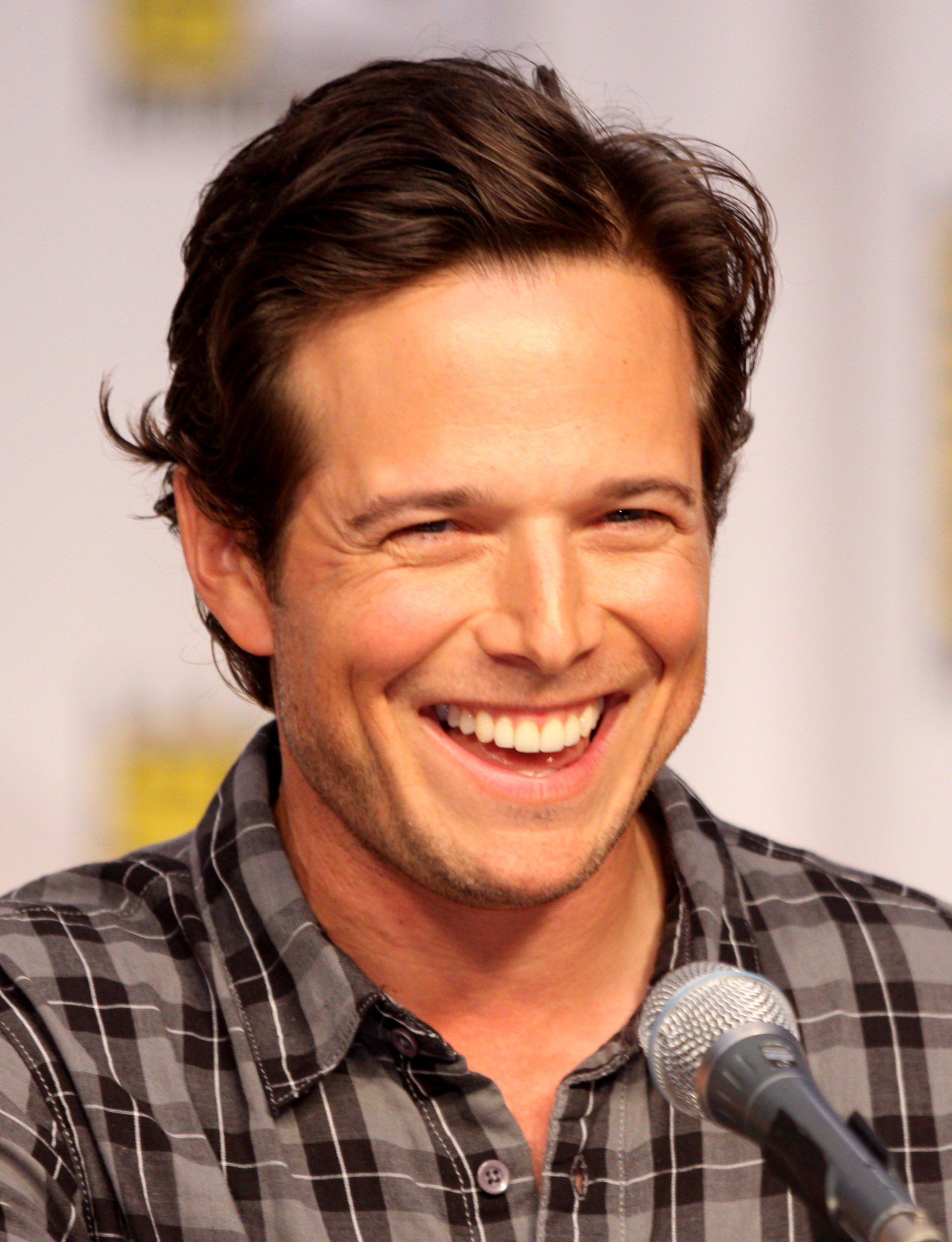
- Wolf in 2010
- Born: Scott Richard Wolf; June 4, 1968 (age 58); Boston, Massachusetts, U.S.
- Occupation: Actor
- Years active: 1989–present
- Spouse: Kelley Marie Limp (m. 2004; sep. 2025)
- Children: 3
- Relatives: Josh Wolf (cousin)

Scott Richard Wolf (born June 4, 1968) is an American actor. In television, he portrayed Bailey Salinger on Party of Five (1994–2000), Jeremy Kates on The Nine (2006–2007), Donnie Ryan on Perception (2013–2015) and Carson Drew on Nancy Drew (2019–2023). In film, his roles include Go (1999) and voicing Scamp in Lady and the Tramp II: Scamp's Adventure (2001).

== Early life ==
Wolf was born in Boston, Massachusetts. He is the son of Susan (née Levy) and Steven Wolf, a health care executive. Wolf was raised in a Reform Jewish family. He grew up in West Orange, New Jersey, and graduated in 1986 from West Orange High School. His cousin is comedian and scriptwriter Josh Wolf.

Wolf attended George Washington University and received a Bachelor of Arts degree in finance in 1990. He was a member of the Alpha Epsilon Pi fraternity.

== Career ==
Wolf is known for his role as Bailey Salinger on Party of Five. On Everwood, the short-lived The Nine and Doc, he portrayed a doctor; and he portrayed Dr. Scott Clemmens on NBC's The Night Shift. He made guest appearances as himself on Action and Kids Inc. His sole Broadway theatre credit to date is Side Man. He has also made a few brief appearances on Voltron: Legendary Defender, as Rax, a Balmeran.

In 2019, Wolf was cast in the lead role of Carson Drew in The CW drama series Nancy Drew. He took over the role from Freddie Prinze Jr., who played the character in the original unaired pilot episode.

== Personal life ==
Wolf was engaged to Alyssa Milano in 1993, but they separated after a year and a half.

In 2002, he began dating Kelley Marie Limp, an alumna of MTV's The Real World: New Orleans, after meeting her in New York City through a mutual friend. They married on May 29, 2004, before temporarily living in Santa Monica, California. They have three children – sons born in February 2009 and November 2012; and a daughter born in 2014. The family resides in Park City, Utah. On June 10, 2025, they announced their separation after 21 years of marriage, with Wolf subsequently filing for divorce. Later that month, on June 24, he filed for a restraining order against his estranged wife.

== Filmography ==
=== Film ===
Year	Title	Role	Notes
1990	Teenage Mutant Ninja Turtles	Thug	Uncredited
1991	All I Want for Christmas	Choir	
1993	Teenage Bonnie and Klepto Clyde	Clyde Barrow	
1994	Double Dragon	Billy Lee	
1996	White Squall	Charles 'Chuck' Gieg / Narrator	
1996	The Evening Star	Bruce Burgess	
1998	Welcome to Hollywood	Actor	
1999	Go	Adam	
2001	Lady and the Tramp II: Scamp's Adventure	Scamp (voice)	Direct-to-video
2002	Emmett's Mark	Emmett Young	
2002	Snow Dogs	Demon Jr. (voice)	
2005	Love Thy Neighbor	Kenny	
2013	Imagine	John Morris	Short film
2013	The Volunteer	Jimmy	
2014	Such Good People	Jake	
2014	37	Sean Raydo	
2015	Meet My Valentine	Tom Bishop	

=== Television films ===
Year	Title	Role	Notes
2001	Jenifer	Jenifer's Date	
2003	Rubbing Charlie	Charlie	
2003	Picking Up & Dropping Off	Will	
2004	Kat Plus One	Josh	
2007	Making It Legal	Josh	
2012	Joey Dakota	Franklin Morgan	
2019	A Christmas Love Story	Greg Scanton	
2022	Rescued by Ruby	Matt Zarrella	Netflix film
2023	A Merry Scottish Christmas	Brad Morgan	Hallmark film

=== Television series ===
Year	Title	Role	Notes
1990	Saved by the Bell	Glee Club Member	Episode: “The Glee Club”
1990–1992	Saved by the Bell	Max Waiter	7 episodes
1991	Saved by the Bell	Movie patron	Episode: “The Aftermath”
1991	Kids Incorporated	Billy / Bobby	Episode: "Double Trouble"
1993	The Commish	Todd Clements	Episode: "Dead Cadet's Society"
1993	Parker Lewis Can't Lose	Brian Sommerville	Episode: "The Rocky Kohler Picture Show"
1993	Evening Shade	David	2 episodes
1994	Blossom	Gordon 'Gordo' McCain	Episode: "Double Date"
1994–2000	Party of Five	Bailey Salinger	Lead Role; 142 episodes
1995	Mad TV	Bailey Salinger	Episode: "1.6"
1998	Saturday Night Live	Host	Episode: "Scott Wolf/Natalie Imbruglia"
1999	Action	Himself	Episode: "Twelfth Step to Hell"
1999	Time of Your Life	Bailey Salinger	2 episodes
2001	Spin City	Tim Connelly	4 episodes
2004–2006	Everwood	Dr. Jake Hartman	36 episodes
2006–2007	The Nine	Jeremy Kates	13 episodes
2008	CSI: NY	MacQuinn Taylor	Episode: "My Name Is Mac Taylor"
2009–2011	V	Chad Decker	22 episodes
2011–2012	NCIS	Casey Stratton / Jonathan Cole	3 episodes
2012–2013	Kaijudo	Raiden Pierce-Okamoto (voice)	52 episodes
2013–2015	Perception	Donnie Ryan	25 episodes
2014–2017	The Night Shift	Dr. Scott Clemmens	35 episodes
2015	BoJack Horseman	Himself (voice)	Episode: "Hank After Dark"
2016	Voltron: Legendary Defender	Rax (voice)	4 episodes
2016–2017	Live with Kelly	Himself	10 episodes
2019–2023	Nancy Drew	Carson Drew	Main role; director 2 episodes
2025–2026	Doc	Dr. Richard Miller	Recurring role; director 1 episode
