= Disney Vault =

Disney marketing term

"Disney Vault" was a term used by The Walt Disney Company for its policy of regularly imposing sales moratoria on home video releases of specific animated feature films. Each Walt Disney Animation Studios film was available for purchase for a limited time, and then returned "to the vault", unavailable for retail sales, pending some future re-release.

Following the acquisition of 21st Century Fox by Disney and the launch of the streaming service Disney+ in 2019, the notion of the Disney Vault has been used colloquially by journalists to describe practices by Walt Disney Studios restricting many more back-catalogue theatrical films from cinema screenings.

== History ==
This is the modern version of Disney's practice of re-releasing its animated feature films in theaters every several years, which began with the reissue of Snow White and the Seven Dwarfs in 1944. During the 1980s, when the home video market was dominated by VHS systems, Disney films would be reissued every ten years, a time gap equal to that of their theatrical reissues. The moratorium period was continued with the evolution of home media delivery mechanisms, including DVD, Blu-ray, and digital streaming, which Disney itself mainly markets through its own Movies Anywhere initiative. Television commercials for Disney home video releases will alert customers that certain films will be placed on moratorium soon, urging them to purchase these films before they "go back into the Disney Vault", in the words often spoken by longtime Disney trailer voice-over actor Mark Elliott. Some direct-to-video Disney films, among them Bambi II, have also been released with a pre-established window of availability.

Dumbo and Alice in Wonderland were among the first movies to be released on home video. Earlier, they were among the first Disney animated films aired on television. They had been chosen to premiere as part of ABC's Walt Disney's Disneyland in 1954 to promote Disneyland and its two popular rides based on these films. Disney has kept this "tradition" by having them permanently released to the public. Disney has never vaulted these two films because they have become so saturated in the market that vaulting them would have been meaningless. Nonetheless, they have been very successful on home video, in their own right. Near the end of the 2000s, they were announced on both Platinum and Diamond editions. They were only released on a special edition with similar marketing to the Disney Vault movies. In 2016, Disney released a Blu-ray/digital copy combo pack of the films, but only as a Disney Movie Club (DMC) exclusive, which was not released to the public. In 2018, Disney ceased to sell these editions to DMC members, and instead offers the regular Blu-rays as an option. Despite evidence that these two films were supposedly going to be part of the Diamond/Platinum line up, why it never happened is unknown. It is likely because the saturation in the market prevented the films from producing the same financial advantages of the other films. With the release of the Signature Collection in 2016, Disney released three movies per year instead of two. By 2022, all of the films that were vaulted had been fully released.

When Disney's streaming service and namesake Disney+ was announced in 2019, Disney CEO Bob Iger stated that the service would contain Disney's entire film library, which would de facto retire the concept of the Disney Vault as a home video control device. However, the service does not include much of Disney's library, and a separate practice restricting repertory screenings of films from the Disney back-catalogue remains in effect. Following Disney's purchase of 21st Century Fox for its entertainment assets, Disney withdrew the Fox film library from distribution to theaters (with the notable exception of The Rocky Horror Picture Show), effectively locking the Fox back-catalog in the Vault.

One Disney film that remains vaulted is Song of the South. Released in 1946, it is based on the Uncle Remus stories by folklorist Joel Chandler Harris. The film has neither aired on television nor it ever been released on home video in the United States due to criticism of its portrayal of African Americans. In 2010 and 2020, Iger stated that the film would not be re-released on either DVD or Disney+. In 2023, Disney announced that it would permanently remove dozens of underperforming films and television series from its Disney+ and Hulu streaming services, effectively vaulting those productions. Disney incurred a $1.5 billion – $1.8 billion impairment charge based on the removed titles. This write-down allowed Disney to avoid paying ongoing residuals and reduced its tax bill.

== Controls ==
The Walt Disney Company stated that this process was done to both control their market and to allow Disney films to be fresh for new generations of young children. A side-effect of the moratorium process was that videos and DVDs of Disney films placed on moratorium become collectibles, sold in stores and at auction websites such as eBay for sums in excess of their original suggested retail price. The practice had also made the Disney films a prime target for bootleg DVD manufacturers.

== Films ==
The following films were considered to be subject to release and later return to the Disney Vault.

=== Main features ===
- Snow White and the Seven Dwarfs (1937)
- Pinocchio (1940)
- Fantasia (1940)
- Dumbo (1941)
- Bambi (1942)
- Cinderella (1950)
- Alice in Wonderland (1951)
- Peter Pan (1953)
- Lady and the Tramp (1955)
- Sleeping Beauty (1959)
- 101 Dalmatians (1961)
- The Jungle Book (1967)
- The Little Mermaid (1989)
- Beauty and the Beast (1991)
- Aladdin (1992)
- The Lion King (1994)

=== Sequels ===
- The Return of Jafar (1994)
- Aladdin and the King of Thieves (1996)
- Beauty and the Beast: The Enchanted Christmas (1997)
- Belle's Magical World (1998)
- The Lion King II: Simba's Pride (1998)
- Fantasia 2000 (1999)
- The Little Mermaid II: Return to the Sea (2000)
- Lady and the Tramp II: Scamp's Adventure (2001)
- Return to Never Land (2002)
- Cinderella II: Dreams Come True (2002)
- 101 Dalmatians II: Patch's London Adventure (2003)
- The Jungle Book 2 (2003)
- The Lion King 1½ (2004)
- Bambi II (2006)
- Cinderella III: A Twist in Time (2007)
- The Little Mermaid: Ariel's Beginning (2008)

== See also ==
- Artificial scarcity
- Moratorium (entertainment)
- Direct-to-video
