= Ward Greene =

American writer, editor, journalist, playwright, and comic strip writer

- Born: December 23, 1892; Asheville, North Carolina, U.S.
- Died: January 22, 1956 (aged 63); Havana, Cuba
- Education: Sewanee: The University of the South
- Occupations: Writer; editor; journalist; playwright; publishing executive
- Spouse: Edith Pfeil Greene
- Children: 1 son (Thomas)
- Writing career
- Pen name: Frank Dudley; Jean Greene
- Notable works: Lady and the Tramp; Death in the Deep South; Rip Kirby; Scamp

Ward Greene (December 23, 1892 – January 22, 1956) was an American writer, editor, journalist, playwright, and general manager of the comic syndicate King Features Syndicate. He is known for overseeing the works of Alex Raymond and other writers and artists at King Features Syndicate, as well as writing Raymond's Rip Kirby comic strip from 1946 until his death.

Greene wrote the magazine story "Happy Dan, the Cynical Dog" for Cosmopolitan in February 1945, and this story was the basis for the 1955 Walt Disney film Lady and the Tramp. Greene also wrote the spinoff comic strip, Scamp, featuring the young son of the Disney dogs, from 1955 to 1956.

== Biography ==
Greene was born in Asheville, North Carolina, in 1892. One of his ancestors was Gen. Nathanael Greene of the Continental Army, one of George Washington's most gifted and trusted officers.

Greene was raised in Atlanta, Georgia, and later attended the Sewanee: The University of the South.

His first job was in 1913 for The Atlanta Journal as an assistant sports editor. Staying at The Journal for ten years, he moved from sports to the police beat to finally become the paper's star reporter. He covered the trial and subsequent lynching of Leo Frank after his conviction for the murder of Mary Phagan in 1913. After a stint at the New-York Tribune in 1917, in 1918–1919 he went to the battlefields of France to cover the Great War for The Atlanta Journal from the perspective of Georgian troops.

Greene joined the Hearst Corporation in 1920, became a writer and editor of the magazine section in 1925, advancing to executive editor, and to general manager in 1946.

He wrote articles for The American Mercury from 1925 to 1931. His first novel, Cora Potts, was published in 1929. Greene's book Death in the Deep South (Avon Publications, 1936) was a fictionalized account of the Leo Frank case. According to reviewer William Rose Benét, Death in the Deep South "reveals with startling clarity how the law works and how the press works after a particularly horrible and brutal murder." It was adapted as the film They Won't Forget in 1937.

Greene's "Happy Dan, the Cynical Dog" (Cosmopolitan magazine, 1945) was the basis for Walt Disney's animated film Lady and the Tramp (1955). King Features immediately spun off "Scamp," a minor unnamed character from the movie, into his own comic strip, written by Greene and illustrated by Dick Moores. Scamp was soon taken over by other creators, but lasted more than 30 years, until 1988.

Greene also wrote under the pseudonyms Frank Dudley and Jean Greene.

A resident of Westwood, New Jersey, Greene died in Havana, Cuba, of a pulmonary edema brought on by pneumonia while en route to a family vacation in California, a year after the movie was released.

== Bibliography ==
=== Books ===
- Cora Potts: A Pilgrim's Progress. Cape, 1929
- Ride the Nightmare. Cape, 1930. Repr. as Life and Loves of a Modern Mister Bluebeard. Avon, 1930
- Weep No More. Smith, 1932
- (as Frank Dudley) The Havana Hotel Murders. Houghton Mifflin, 1936
- Death in the Deep South. Avon, 1936
- King Cobra. Carrick, 1940
- Route 28. Doubleday, 1940
- What They Don't Know: A Novel. Random House, 1944
- (as Jean Greene). The Forgetful Elephant. McKay, 1945
- Star Reporters and 34 of Their Stories. Random House, 1948
- Lady and the Tramp: The Story of Two Dogs. Simon, 1953
- (with Alex Raymond) Rip Kirby: The First Modern Detective. Complete Comic Strips 1948-1951. IDW Publishing, 2012.

=== Articles and short stories ===
- "Is the Jelly Bean from Georgia?" [interview with F. Scott Fitzgerald]. 1923. Conversations with F. Scott Fitzgerald, ed. Matthew J. Bruccoli and Judith S. Baughman, UP of Mississippi, 2004, pp. 40–42
- "Notes for a History of the Klan." The American Mercury June 1925, pp. 240–43.
- "Boy for Tea." The American Mercury June 1930, pp. 223–27. Repr. Ellery Queen's Mystery Magazine July 1954, pp. 76–81
- "Rubber Stamp." The American Mercury Jan. 1930, pp. 109–12.
- "Caravan to Mecca." The American Mercury Mar. 1931, pp. 353–60
- "Happy Dan, the Cynical Dog." Cosmopolitan Feb. 1945, pp. 19–21

=== Plays ===
- Honey. Prod. Cape Playhouse, Dennis, MA, 1938. Prod. Hilltop Theatre, Ellicott City, MD, 1940–41
