= Damon Runyon Theater =

American anthology TV series

- Genre: Anthology
- Presented by: Donald Woods
- Country of origin: United States
- Original language: English
- No. of seasons: 2
- No. of episodes: 39

Production
- Producers: Lou Breslow; Michael Kraike
- Running time: 30 minutes
- Production companies: Normandie Television Pictures, Inc.

Original release
- Network: CBS
- Release: April 16, 1955 – June 30, 1956

Damon Runyon Theater is an American television program that presented dramatized versions of Damon Runyon's short stories. Hosted by Donald Woods, the program aired for a total of 39 episodes on CBS from April 1955 through February 1956 (repeats continued through June).

== Radio ==
Damon Runyon Theatre was broadcast on radio in the late 1940s. Actor John Brown had the role of Broadway, the narrator who often participated in the stories. Russell Hughes adapted Runyon's stories, including characters such as Harrigan, the Cop, Harry the Horse, Little Miss Marker, and Milk-Ear Willie. Richard Sanville directed the program, and Vern Carstensen was the producer. Stations that carried the show included WOR in New York and KGO in San Francisco.

== Episode list ==
=== Season 1 ===
#	Title	Original Airdate
1-1	"Pick the Winner" (pilot)	April 16, 1955
1-2	"Dancing Dan's Christmas"	April 23, 1955
1-3	"All Is Not Gold"	April 30, 1955
1-4	"The Lacework Kid"	May 7, 1955
1-5	"Numbers and Figures"	May 14, 1955
1-6	"Tobias the Terrible"	May 21, 1955
1-7	"Old Em's Kentucky Home"	May 28, 1955
1-8	"Lonely Heart"	June 4, 1955
1-9	"It Comes Up Money"	June 11, 1955
1-10	"The Big Umbrella"	June 18, 1955
1-11	"Big Shoulders"	June 25, 1955
1-12	"Teacher's Pet"	July 2, 1955
1-13	"The Mink Doll"	July 9, 1955
1-14	"Bunny On the Beach"	July 16, 1955
1-15	"The Big Fix"	July 23, 1955
1-16	"A Light In France"	July 30, 1955
1-17	"A Nice Price"	August 6, 1955
1-18	"Small Town Caper"	August 13, 1955
1-19	"There's No Forever"	August 20, 1955
1-20	"Earthquake Morgan"	August 27, 1955

=== Season 2 ===
#	Title	Original Airdate
2-1	"Bred For Battle"	October 15, 1955
2-2	"Miami Moolah"	October 22, 1955
2-3	"Situation Wanted"	October 29, 1955
2-4	"A Star Lights Up"	November 5, 1955
2-5	"Broadway Dateline"	November 12, 1955
2-6	"A Job For the Macarone"	November 26, 1955
2-7	"Barbecue"	December 3, 1955
2-8	"Honorary Degree"	December 10, 1955
2-9	"Dog About Town"	December 17, 1955
2-10	"Blonde Mink"	December 24, 1955
2-11	"Judy the Jinx"	December 31, 1955
2-12	"The Face of Johnny Dolliver"	January 7, 1956
2-13	"Cleo"	January 14, 1956
2-14	"The Good Luck Kid"	January 21, 1956
2-15	"The Pee Wees Take Over"	January 28, 1956
2-16	"The Pigeon Gets Plucked"	February 4, 1956
2-17	"A Tale of Two Citizens"	February 11, 1956
2-18	"Hot Oil"	February 18, 1956
2-19	"Miracle Jones"	February 25, 1956

== Guest stars ==
Actors who appeared on the series included:

- Jack Albertson
- Gene Barry
- Frances Bavier
- Jack Carson
- Dane Clark
- Charles Coburn
- Broderick Crawford
- Paul Douglas
- Mona Freeman
- Coleen Gray
- Barbara Hale
- Edward Everett Horton
- John Ireland
- Dorothy Lamour
- Thomas Mitchell
- Edmond O'Brien
- Hugh O'Brian
- Larry Roberts
- Cesar Romero
- James Whitmore
- Fay Wray
- Keenan Wynn

== Production ==
Lou Breslow was the producer, and the show was a Screen Gems production. Sidney Miller directed the program. It was sponsored by Anheuser-Busch's Budweiser beer,
