= They Won't Forget =

1937 film

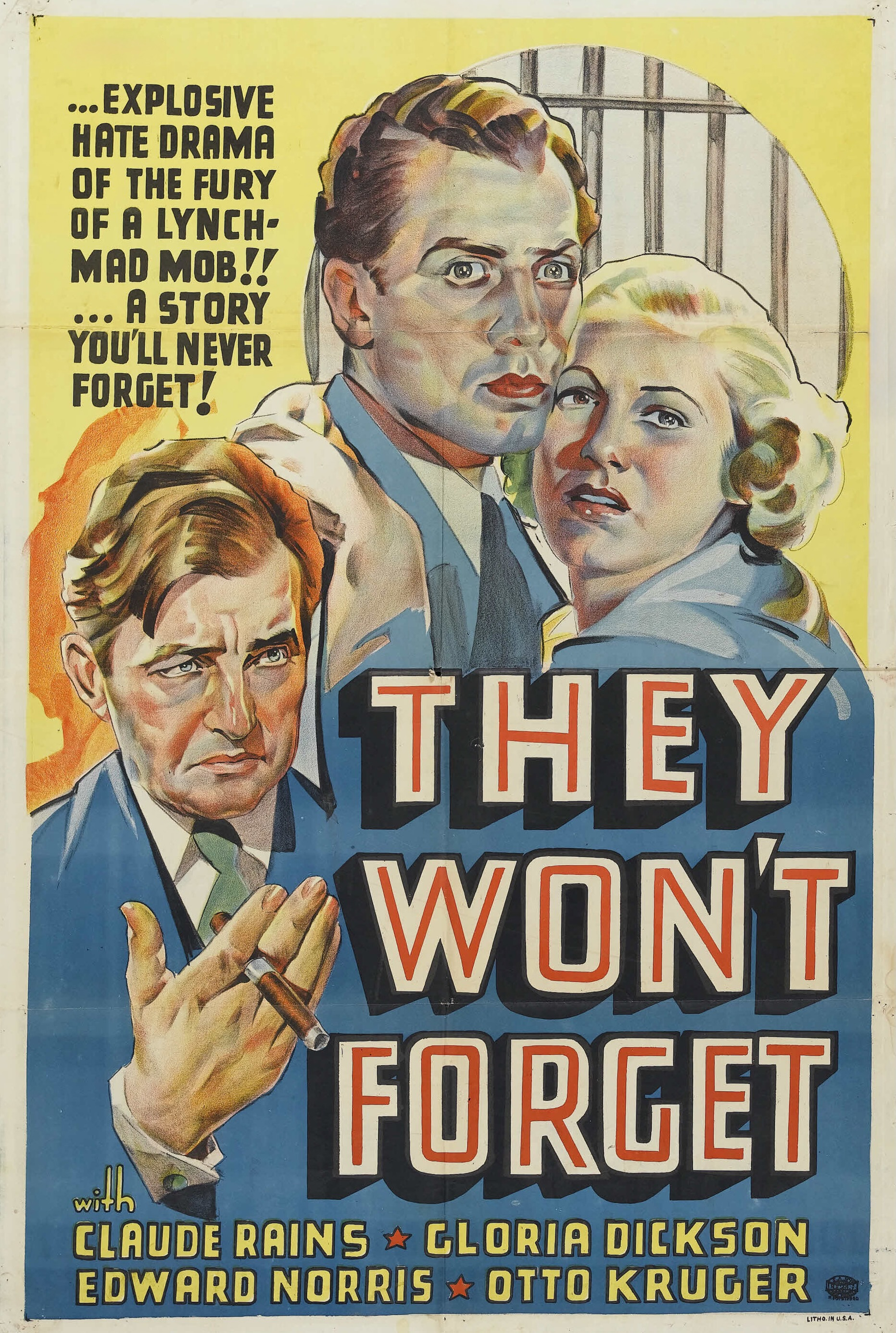
- Theatrical release poster
- Directed by: Mervyn LeRoy
- Written by: Robert Rossen; Aben Kandel
- Based on: Death in the Deep South by Ward Greene
- Produced by: Mervyn LeRoy; Jack L. Warner
- Starring: Claude Rains; Gloria Dickson; Edward Norris; Otto Kruger; Lana Turner
- Cinematography: Arthur Edeson
- Edited by: Thomas Richards
- Music by: Adolph Deutsch
- Production company: First National Pictures
- Distributed by: Warner Bros. Pictures
- Release date: July 14, 1937 (New York City)
- Running time: 95 minutes
- Country: United States
- Language: English

They Won't Forget is a 1937 American crime drama film directed by Mervyn LeRoy and starring Claude Rains, Gloria Dickson, Edward Norris, Otto Kruger, and Lana Turner. It marked the feature film debuts of both Dickson and Turner. The plot focuses on a trial in a Southern town, where a lynch mob and district attorney (Rains) accuse a Northern teacher (Norris) of the brutal murder of a teenage girl (Turner). It is based on the 1936 novel Death in the Deep South by Ward Greene, which was in turn a fictionalized account of a real-life case: the trial and subsequent lynching of Leo Frank after the murder of Mary Phagan in 1913 Atlanta, Georgia.

Released in New York City in July 1937, They Won't Forget was favorably received by film critics, with many heralding it as the best film of the year. The film was notably faced with censorship in the southern United States, particularly the state of Georgia, where it was effectively banned from theatrical exhibition.

== Plot ==
A Southern town is rocked by scandal when teenager Mary Clay is brutally murdered on the campus of her business school on Confederate Memorial Day. The crime quickly becomes a cause célèbre. Andrew Griffin, a district attorney with political ambitions, sees the crime as his way to the Senate if he can find the right scapegoat to be tried for Mary's murder. He seeks out Robert Hale, Mary's teacher. Even though all evidence against Hale is circumstantial, Hale happens to be from New York City, and Griffin works with reporter William Brock to create a media frenzy of prejudice and hatred against the teacher. The issue moves from innocence or guilt to the continuing bigotry and suspicion between South and North, especially given the significance of the day of the murder.

The trial attracts a famous Northern attorney, Michael Gleason, who agrees to defend Hale. Immense pressures begin to mount on members of the community to help in the conviction – the black janitor, Tump Redwine, is induced to lie on the stand for fear he himself will be convicted if Hale is found innocent; a juror serves as the sole holdout to a guilty verdict; and a local barber is afraid to testify to something he knows because it could exonerate Hale. Gleason does his best, but Hale is ultimately convicted of Mary's murder and sentenced to death.

The governor of the state, with the support of his wife, decides to commit political suicide by commuting Hale's death sentence to life imprisonment because the evidence is simply insufficient to send a man to his death. The townsfolk are enraged, and Mary's brothers, who have been threatening all along to take matters into their own hands if Hale is not executed, plot and carry out Hale's abduction and lynching with the help of a vengeful mob.

Afterward, Hale's widow, Sybil, goes to Griffin's office to return a check he had sent her to help her out, telling him he cannot soothe his conscience that way. As he and Brock watch Sybil leave the building, Brock wonders if Hale was guilty. Griffin replies without much concern, "I wonder."

== Cast ==
- Claude Rains as District Attorney Andrew J. Griffin
- Gloria Dickson as Sybil Hale
- Edward Norris as Professor Robert Perry Hale
- Otto Kruger as Michael Gleason
- Allyn Joslyn as William A. Brock
- Lana Turner as Mary Clay
- Linda Perry as Imogene Mayfield
- Elisha Cook, Jr. as Joe Turner
- Cy Kendall as Detective Laneart
- Clinton Rosemond as Tump Redwine
- E. Alyn Warren as Professor Carlisle P. Buxton
- Elisabeth Risdon as Mrs. Hale
- Clifford Soubier as Jim Timberlake
- Granville Bates as Pindar
- Ann Shoemaker as Mrs. Mountford
- Paul Everton as Governor Thomas Mountford
- Donald Briggs as Harmon Drake
- Sibyl Harris as Mrs. Clay
- Trevor Bardette as Shattuck Clay
- Elliott Sullivan as Luther Clay
- Wilmer Hines as Ransom Scott Clay
- Eddie Acuff as Fred
- Frank Faylen as Bill Price
- Leonard Mudie as Judge Moore
- Harry Davenport as Confederate Veteran
- Harry Beresford as Confederate Veteran
- Edward McWade as Confederate Veteran
- Ronald Reagan as Man in Crowd (uncredited)

== Production ==
=== Development ===
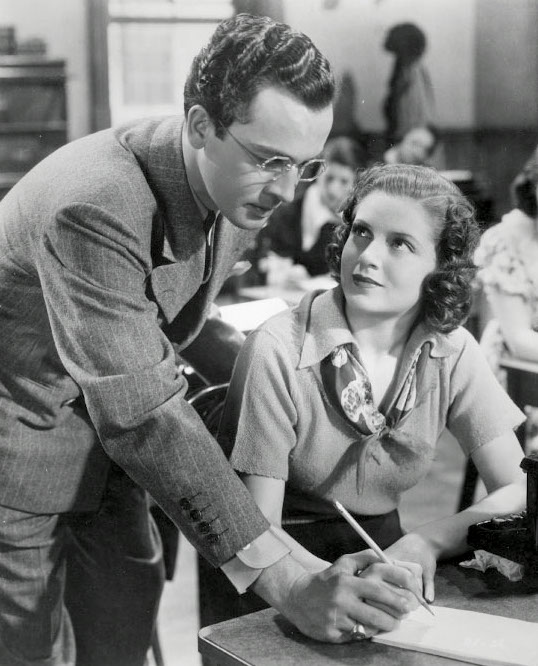
Edward Norris and Lana Turner in They Won't Forget

They Won't Forget was adapted from the 1936 novel Death in the Deep South by Ward Greene. Greene's novel was based on the 1913 wrongful lynching murder of Leo Frank, the Jewish superintendent of a factory in Atlanta, Georgia, who was accused of murdering Mary Phagan, a thirteen-year-old worker. The book was optioned for a film adaptation shortly after its publication by Warner Bros. studio head Jack L. Warner.

Screenwriter Aben Kandel completed a preliminary draft of They Won't Forget in January 1937. The explicit use of racist epithets in Greene's novel was significantly toned down in Kandel's screenplay. Despite this, Joseph Breen, who enforced the Hays Code, demanded that various alterations to be made, as Kandel's screenplay featured "numerous scenes of unnecessary drinking and, at least, one scene of drunkenness, perjured witnesses, a corrupt and dishonest jury, brutalizing by the police, excessive brutality, and a suggestion of mob violence, which leads to a lynching." Furthermore, Breen asserted that "there is nothing in the picture to suggest anything like compensating moral values."

After Breen's criticisms of the screenplay were assessed, Warner Bros. brought in screenwriter Robert Rossen to perform rewrites of Kandel's original script. Over several weeks in February 1937, Rossen and Kandel collaborated on a redraft; in particular, they rendered the police brutality implicit rather than explicit, and eliminated overt suggestion that district attorney Andrew Griffin was encouraging and abetting police corruption and evidence tampering.

=== Casting ===
Claude Rains was cast in the lead role of Andrew Griffin, and later commented that he was "frightened to death" to accept the role, fearing he would be unable to execute a southern accent. To prepare for the part, Rains worked with a dialect coach from Louisiana. The film marked the feature debuts of Gloria Dickson as Sybil Hale, the wife of the accused Robert Hale, and fifteen-year-old Lana Turner as murder victim Mary Clay.

=== Filming ===
They Won't Forget was originally offered to director Fritz Lang, who passed on the project to instead direct Fury (1936), a similarly-themed crime drama based on the kidnapping and murder of Brooke Hart. Mervyn LeRoy was hired to direct after Lang declined.

Principal photography of They Won't Forget began in the spring of 1937, with filming nearing its conclusion by April of that year.

== Release ==
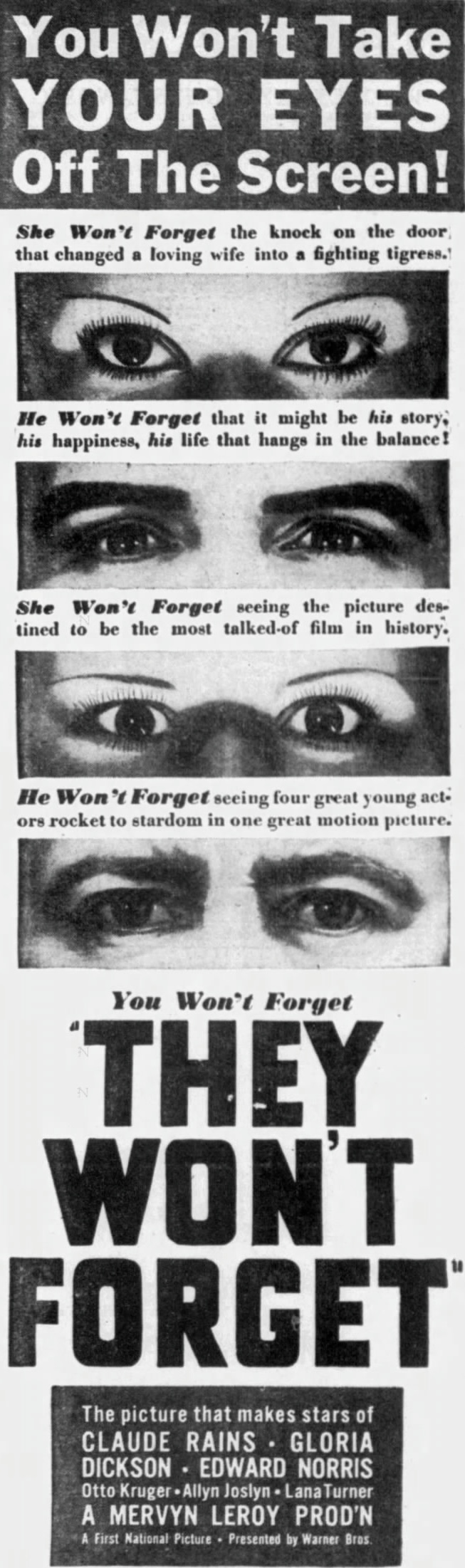
Newspaper advertisement, July 1937

They Won't Forget premiered in New York City on July 14, 1937. The film opened in Los Angeles on October 28, 1937.

Twenty years after its original release and the rise of Lana Turner as a major film star, the film was theatrically reissued and marketed around her role, despite her only appearing onscreen for twelve minutes.

=== Censorship ===
Efforts were made to prevent the film from being shown in several locales in the southern United States. Mrs. Alonzo Richardson, the film censor of Atlanta, succeeded in a campaign to prevent the film from being released anywhere in the state of Georgia. In correspondence to Joseph Breen, a film censor for the Motion Picture Producers and Distributors of America, Richardson wrote:

You will be interested to know that we have succeeded in keeping They Won't Forget out of the state entirely. Written by an Atlanta man, recalling one of the darkest pages of the state history, capable of reviving conditions which would be ghastly in the tragedy of results; exhibitors, newspapers, populace have joined us in asking that this thing will not be done to our state. The common consent has been obtained, and we will not have the picture in the state.

Despite the screenplay's elimination of any explicit subtext suggesting the Robert Hale character was Jewish (director LeRoy and screenwriters Rossen and Kandel were all Jewish), Jewish leaders in Atlanta agreed with the ban, fearing that the release of the film there may reignite antisemitism in the state of Georgia. In an editorial published by Atlanta's Jewish newspaper, the Southern Israelite, it was noted that "cinema fans may be disappointed, but it is safe to wager that the majority of Atlantans are grateful to Warner Brothers for withholding, at considerable financial loss to the film producers, the showing in Atlanta... At the same time, that debt is increased by the knowledge that the film's great message of social justice is being heard by thousands throughout the country."

=== Home media ===
The Warner Archive Collection released the film on DVD-R on October 20, 2009.

== Reception ==
=== Box office ===
According to film historian Matthew Bernstein, They Won't Forget was not a "clear-cut" box-office success in the United States, particularly in the south, where it was not favorably received.

=== Critical response ===
They Won't Forget was very well-received by film critics, with many heralding it for its sociological themes. Frank S. Nugent of The New York Times called the film "a brilliant sociological drama and a trenchant film editorial against intolerance and hatred." Wanda Hale of the New York Daily News praised the film as an "explosive" drama, lauding LeRoy's direction and the performances of Raines and Dickson. Reviewers for The Hollywood Reporter and Motion Picture Herald praised actor Clinton Rosemond's portrayal of Tump Redwine.

The Wall Street Journal also praised the film for its objective treatment of the material, noting that "no attempt has been made to adorn it with moral, nor to offer a solution. Rather, as if armed with a razor edged scalpel, the producers have laid bare the passions and hatred and unshackled ambitions lying beneath the outer covering of human lives." The Brooklyn Daily Eagle similarly felt the film had a powerful social message, publishing in their review that the film "should be seen by every citizen of the United States... it teaches a lesson that can be taken to heart by people in every section of the county." Variety wrote that the film "pulls no punches, indicting lynch law and mob fury with scalpel-like precision."

Writing for Night and Day in 1937, Graham Greene gave the film a favorable review, comparing its effect to that of Fritz Lang's Fury (1936). Greene found that "the direction of the picture is brilliant", and praised the writing for having "a better, less compromising story". However, he confessed that he "doubt[ed] that They Won't Forget [would] have the same success [as Fury]". David Platt of The Daily Worker also favorably compared the film to Fury and heralded it as the best feature of 1937, declaring it a "masterpiece."

== Legacy ==
In the documentary film I Am Not Your Negro, James Baldwin's unpublished notes recall the impression the face of the terrified black suspect left on him.

They Won't Forget is famously known for marking actress Lana Turner's screen debut, who, according to film historian Glenn Erickson, "drew attention in a scandalous shot showing her walking on the street in an ostentatiously tight sweater." Director LeRoy later commented: "It was very important that the girl in our story have what they call 'flesh impact.' She had to make it look like it was a sex murder. You'll notice we never use the word 'rape' in the screenplay. We couldn't say things like that in those days. I figured that a tight sweater on a beautiful young girl would convey to the audience everything we couldn't say outright."

== Other versions ==
The story was also dramatized in 1987 as a four-hour television miniseries entitled The Murder of Mary Phagan, written by Larry McMurtry and starring Jack Lemmon, Kevin Spacey, Rebecca Miller, Cynthia Nixon and William H. Macy.

== Sources ==
- Bernstein, Matthew (2009). Screening a Lynching: The Leo Frank Case on Film and Television. Athens, Georgia: University of Georgia Press. ISBN 978-0-820-32752-5.
- Grant, Kevin (2020). Vigilantes: Private Justice in Popular Cinema. Jefferson, North Carolina: McFarland & Company. ISBN 978-1-476-63868-3.
