= Lady and the Tramp =

1955 animated Disney film

- Theatrical release poster
- Directed by: Hamilton Luske; Clyde Geronimi; Wilfred Jackson
- Story by: Erdman Penner; Joe Rinaldi; Ralph Wright; Don DaGradi
- Based on: "Happy Dan, the Cynical Dog" by Ward Greene
- Produced by: Walt Disney
- Starring: Peggy Lee; Barbara Luddy; Larry Roberts; Bill Thompson; Bill Baucom; Stan Freberg; Verna Felton; Alan Reed; George Givot; Dallas McKennon; Lee Millar; The Mellomen
- Edited by: Don Halliday
- Music by: Oliver Wallace
- Production company: Walt Disney Productions
- Distributed by: Buena Vista Film Distribution
- Release date: June 22, 1955
- Running time: 76 minutes
- Country: United States
- Language: English
- Budget: $4 million
- Box office: $187 million

Lady and the Tramp is a 1955 American animated musical romantic comedy film produced by Walt Disney Productions and released by Buena Vista Film Distribution. Based on Ward Greene's 1945 Cosmopolitan magazine story "Happy Dan, the Cynical Dog", it was directed by Hamilton Luske, Clyde Geronimi, and Wilfred Jackson. The film features the voices of Peggy Lee, Barbara Luddy, Larry Roberts, Bill Thompson, Bill Baucom, Stan Freberg, Verna Felton, Alan Reed, George Givot, Dallas McKennon, and Lee Millar. The film follows Lady, the pampered Cocker Spaniel, as she grows from puppy to adult, deals with changes in her family, and meets and falls in love with the homeless mutt Tramp.

The inspiration for Lady and the Tramp originated in 1925 when Walt Disney presented his wife Lillian with a Chow Chow puppy in a hatbox. In 1937, Joe Grant, a storyboard artist, pitched to Disney an original idea as inspired by his English Springer Spaniel. Throughout the 1940s, the project underwent numerous story revisions, but it was shelved due to Disney's production of several package films. Grant left the Disney studios in 1949.

In 1952, Disney placed the project back into active development, and the final story was revised by Erdman Penner and Joe Rinaldi. The film's art direction was supervised by Claude Coats, who took inspiration from gingerbread architecture. Peggy Lee and Sonny Burke wrote the film's original songs, while Oliver Wallace composed the instrumental musical score. During production, Disney decided Lady and the Tramp would be the first animated film to be filmed in the CinemaScope widescreen film process. It was also Disney's first animated film to be distributed by their Buena Vista division following their split from RKO Radio Pictures.

Lady and the Tramp was released in theaters on June 22, 1955, and achieved box office success. While it initially received mixed reviews from critics, the film's critical reception has grown more favorable over time, and it is now regarded as one of the greatest animated films of all time. The film launched a long-running Disney comic strip featuring Scamp. A direct-to-video sequel, titled Lady and the Tramp II: Scamp's Adventure, was released in 2001. A live-action/CGI hybrid remake premiered in 2019 as a launch title for the Disney+ streaming service. In 2023, Lady and the Tramp was selected for preservation in the United States National Film Registry by the Library of Congress as being "culturally, historically or aesthetically significant."

== Plot ==
In 1909 New England town, "Jim Dear" gives his wife "Darling" (Note: Their real names are never revealed. They only address each other by these terms of endearment, so others – the dogs in particular – do the same.) a Cocker Spaniel puppy as a Christmas present. The puppy, named Lady, grows up pampered by her doting owners, and befriends her neighbors' dogs Jock (a Scottie) and Trusty (an elderly bloodhound). Across town, a stray terrier-mix named Tramp lives freely on the streets while avoiding the dogcatcher.

After overhearing that Darling is expecting a baby, Tramp warns Lady that babies often replace household pets. Lady worries about losing her place in the family, but her fears ease after the baby is born and she is introduced to him.

Later, Jim Dear and Darling take a short trip, leaving the house, Lady, and the baby in the care of Jim Dear's aunt Sarah, who hates dogs and brings along her two Siamese cats, Si and Am. (Note: Si and Am's speech and behavior reflects derogatory stereotypes of Asian people. In 2020, the Disney+ streaming service added a content warning for the film, noting that Lady and the Tramp "includes negative depictions and/or mistreatment of people or cultures" and that "these stereotypes were wrong then and are wrong now.") The cats cause damage in the house and make it appear that Lady is responsible. Sarah takes Lady to have a muzzle fitted, but Lady escapes into the streets where she is attacked by several stray dogs. Tramp rescues her and later takes her around town, including a dinner at Tony's Restaurant. Although Lady enjoys spending time with him, she ultimately decides her responsibility is to remain with her family.

While escorting Lady home, Tramp is distracted chasing chickens, and Lady is captured by the dogcatcher. At the dog pound, several stray dogs tell Lady about Tramp’s history with other female dogs, causing her to doubt his sincerity. After Sarah retrieves Lady, she chains her in the backyard as punishment. When Tramp later attempts to apologize, Lady angrily rejects him.

That night, Lady notices a rat entering the house through the baby’s bedroom window. Unable to alert Sarah, she barks until Tramp returns to investigate. Tramp fights and kills the rat, but in the struggle, accidentally flips the baby’s crib. Sarah assumes the dogs attacked the child and has Tramp taken away by the dogcatcher while locking Lady in the cellar.

When Jim Dear and Darling return home, Lady leads them to the dead rat, proving what happened. Jock and Trusty pursue the dogcatcher’s wagon in an attempt to rescue Tramp, causing an accident that injures Trusty. Jim Dear and Darling arrive in time to save Tramp, who is adopted into the family.

By the following Christmas, Tramp has settled into domestic life with Lady, and the two have puppies together. Jock and the recovering Trusty visit the family, with Trusty entertaining the puppies with stories from his past.

== Voice cast ==
- Peggy Lee as Darling, Lady's owner and Jim Dear's wife.
  - Lee also voices Peg, a stray female Pekingese with a Brooklyn Accent whom Lady meets at the pound; as well as Si and Am, Aunt Sarah's twin Siamese cats with a knack for mischief and never-ending trouble
- Barbara Luddy as Lady, an American Cocker Spaniel, who is the primary character in the film.
- Larry Roberts as Tramp, a mongrel (with a mixture of a schnauzer and a terrier), with a talent for escaping dog-catchers. He nicknames Lady "Pidge", short for Pigeon, owing to her naivety. He never refers to himself by name, although most of the film's canine cast refer to him as the Tramp. Tony and Joe like to call him "Butch".
- Bill Thompson as Jock, a Scottish Terrier who is one of Lady's neighbors.
  - Thompson also voices Joe, Tony's assistant chef; Bull, a stray male bulldog from the dog pound who speaks with a Cockney accent; Dachsie, a stray male dachshund at the dog pound who speaks with a German accent; an Irish-accented policeman; and Jim's friend.
- Bill Baucom as Trusty, a bloodhound who used to track criminals with his Grandpappy, Old Reliable, until he lost his sense of smell.
- Stan Freberg as the Beaver. Nicknamed "Mr. Busy" by Tramp. The character speaks with a lisp, in which he whistles through his teeth when he makes the "S" sound. This character trait served as the inspiration for Gopher in Winnie the Pooh and the Honey Tree (1966).
- Verna Felton as Aunt Sarah, Jim Dear's aunt who babysits for the couple. She is a cat person and dislikes dogs.
- Alan Reed as Boris, a stray male Borzoi from the dog pound with a Russian accent.
- George Givot as Tony, the owner and chef of Tony's Italian restaurant.
- Dallas McKennon as Toughy, a stray male mutt with a slight Brooklyn accent.
  - McKennon also voices Pedro, a stray male Chihuahua with a Mexican accent; a professor; and a laughing hyena.
- Lee Millar as Jim Dear, Lady's owner and Darling's husband.
  - Millar also voices the dogcatcher and a man in the pet shop.
- The Mellomen (Thurl Ravenscroft, Bill Lee, Max Smith, and Bob Stevens) as Dog Chorus.
  - Ravenscroft also voices Al the alligator.

Donald Novis sang the lead vocals for the film's opening song "Peace on Earth".

== Production ==
=== Story development ===
According to the film's publicity materials, the origins of Lady and the Tramp were inspired by an incident in 1925. At the time, Walt Disney had been actively working at the Disney Brothers Studio‍ and was seldomly at home with his wife Lillian. One night, Disney became so preoccupied with one cartoon that he stayed overnight at the studio while his wife waited patiently for him to return home. Guilt-ridden, Disney decided to purchase a dog companion for Lillian for Christmas. Lillian had disliked dogs, but regardless, Disney asked her what breed of dog she would want if she had to make a choice. She answered with a chow dog, as she read somewhere they were less odorous.

Disney then purchased a chow puppy from a nearby kennel on Christmas Eve and kept the dog near his brother Roy's house until the next morning. On Christmas Day, Disney presented Lillian with a peace offering kept inside a hat box. She opened the box expecting a hat, but was immediately floored when she saw the puppy with a red ribbon around its neck. The Disneys named their new puppy Sunnee. Years later, Lillian recalled: "I forgave him. You can't stay mad at Walt for very long." This inspired the film's opening sequence, in which Darling unwraps a hat box on Christmas morning and finds Lady inside.

"We were free to develop the story as we saw fit, which is not the case when you work on a classic. Then you must adhere rigidly to the sequences conceived by the author, which are familiar to your audience. Here, as the characters came to life and the scenes took shape, we were able to alter, embellish, eliminate and change to improve the material."

— Walt Disney, explaining the story process on Lady and the Tramp

In 1937, Joe Grant, a storyboard artist working for Walt Disney Productions, pitched an idea inspired by the antics of his English Springer Spaniel Lady, and how she got "shoved aside" by Grant's new baby. The twist is that the story would be told from a dog's perspective. Grant then presented Disney with several sketches of Lady, which Disney enjoyed. He then commissioned Grant to commence story development on a new animated feature. According to Frank Tashlin, who had worked on the film's early development, a rough story outline had been written by 1940. The outline included two Siamese cats that were named Nip and Tuck as secondary characters. Tashlin stated: "Joe Grant had models of the dog, Lady, and Sam [Cobean] and I did a story. I never saw the film...I think we had rats coming after the baby at the end...did they have that? Then that's what we did."

In 1943, story development resumed when Disney decided to produce the story into an animated featurette. Grant pitched the new story, and while Disney was fascinated by the charm of the character Lady, he felt the story was lacking something "extra". Disney explained, "We discovered during our preliminary conferences that we only had half of the story we wanted. Our prim, well-bred, house-sheltered little Lady, when confronted with a crisis, just up and ran away." That same year, Disney then read the 1937 short story "Happy Dan, the Cynical Dog" by Ward Greene, an editor for King Features, which also distributed Disney comic strips. The story was later published in the February 1945 issue of Cosmopolitan magazine. In the story, Happy Dan was a streetwise, happy-go-lucky mutt compared to Lady, in Grant's story, who was refined. Disney contacted Greene and suggested a romance between the dogs, stating, "Your dog and my dog have got to get together!" Greene agreed, and he promptly rewrote his story retitling it "Happy Dan, the Whistling Dog, and Miss Patsy, the Beautiful Spaniel." Disney subsequently acquired the rights to the story. Back at the studio, the stray dog was first named Homer, but Grant and Dick Huemer renamed him Rags and then Bozo. The revised story told of the "amazing adventures" between the two mismatched canines, though it served minimal influence on the finished film.

In 1944, Disney heard a radio play adapted from another Cosmopolitan magazine story titled "Lady". He then hired its author Charles "Cap" Palmer to write a story treatment. Palmer wrote an expanded story outline and suggested musical numbers. Palmer's outline resembles the plot structure of the finished film, but with differences. Lady is romantically pursued by Hubert, a stuffy, pompous canine (modeled after Ralph Bellamy) who lives next-door. The Siamese Cats were named Nip and Tuck; the intrusive rat was named Herman and was characterized with a sly personality with comic overtones.

That same year, Grant wrote a short story titled "Lady", which was published in a children's book Walt Disney's Surprise Package published by Simon & Schuster. This version of the story had a loyal female Cocker Spaniel protecting the baby from two Siamese cats that were brought by a mother-in-law character. The cocker spaniel is blamed for having caused a mess, but her innocence is proven and the mother-in-law leaves with her two cats in tow. A story conference was held on September 25, 1945 with Grant, Dick Huemer, Disney, Charles Palmer, and other story artists in attendance to expand on Grant's story. The story was noticeably expanded to have more of the action occur outside of the house. Ted Sears suggested a scenario where Lady is taken inside a dog pound. The mother-in-law character was recharacterized as Aunt Sarah to avoid having the antagonists be too closely related.

During the story meeting, Disney suggested the name "Tramp". It has been alleged that Disney may have been inspired by the Rodgers and Hart standard "The Lady Is a Tramp." From there, Huemer suggested that Tramp should be "a mongrel". Disney agreed, "A neat-looking mongrel. I don't think we should make him a funny-looking guy. After all, he's our leading man. He's got to be a Cary Grant. He's got to have a certain something that you like." When Greene reiterated a romance between the two dogs, Grant and Huemer objected to the idea, suggesting it was "distasteful" and "utterly contrary to nature." When the two character names were settled, Disney insisted on the film's final title being Lady and the Tramp despite Greene's objections and the concerns of film distributors. Disney declared, "That's what it's about—a lady and a tramp." However, further story development was placed on hold when Disney decided to scale back further animation projects to more affordable package films.

In 1952, Walt's older brother Roy O. Disney encouraged him to place Lady and the Tramp back into production, provided they keep the production costs low and release it in smaller theaters for first-run engagements. Disney then held two polls, independently of each other, within the animation department to gauge whether there was considerable interest in the subject matter of the project. "With the reaction we got", Disney said, "I have confidence that if we get going on this, we're liable to get a picture out of here that will be a change of pace in many ways." Disney then convened a story conference, with a recorded attendance of 26 studio employees, which was held on May 15, 1952.

A month later, in June 1952, Disney announced Lady and the Tramp was in production and budgeted at $2.5 million, with its release set for 1954. Since Huemer and Grant had left the Disney studio in 1948 and 1949, respectively, the final story development was done mostly by Erdman Penner and Joe Rinaldi. A solid story began to consolidate in 1953, based on Grant's storyboards and Greene's short story. The character Hubert was later replaced with Jock, a Scottish Terrier, and Trusty, a bloodhound. Originally, Lady's owners were called Jim Brown and Elizabeth. These were changed to highlight Lady's point of view. They were briefly referred to as "Mister" and "Missis" before settling on the names "Jim Dear" and "Darling". Nip and Tuck, the Siamese cats, were renamed Si and Am. The rat was recharacterized more realistically to raise dramatic tension.

When Peggy Lee was hired to compose songs for Lady and the Tramp, she was shown the film's narrative through storyboards. It was initially written to have Trusty killed by the dog catcher's wagon. Lee remembered:

"I was like a small child. The rat scared me. And when Trusty was killed, I was so upset. I'm very sentimental about animals. It made me cry. I said, 'Oh Walt you can't do this,' and he said, 'You have to have some tension in the story. It would change everything if he's not killed.' I said, 'But if you kill him the children will cry too much, like with Bambi'—although I'd never seen Bambi. So he said, finally, 'Well, all right. Old Trusty can live... but the rat stays."

At Disney's insistence, Greene wrote a novelization of the film, published in 1953, so that film-going audiences would be familiar with the story. Titled Lady and the Tramp: The Story of Two Dogs, the novelization featured a foreword by Walt Disney and the illustrations were storyboard sketches drawn by Joe Rinaldi. Due to Greene's novelization, Grant was not given any screen credit for his work on the film. In 1995, Grant stated, "Lady and the Tramp is a real tragedy as far as I'm concerned as far as the credit for it. This I never forgave Walt for. He knew damn well where all this stuff came from!" In 2006, animation director Eric Goldberg rectified Grant's involvement in a making-of DVD documentary of the film's Platinum Edition release.

=== Casting ===
Barbara Luddy was a radio actress best known for her role on the First Nighter radio program. From a dozen auditions from several actresses, Luddy was selected as the voice of Lady. She later provided the voice for several Disney characters, including Merryweather in Sleeping Beauty (1959), Kanga in the Winnie the Pooh featurettes, and Mother Rabbit and the church mouse Mother Sexton in Robin Hood (1973). Larry Roberts had been performing on stage for a number of years. Roberts won the part as Tramp after a Disney story artist had seen him performing in a local theater production.

Several of the studio's voice regulars were cast in the film, including Verna Felton as Aunt Sarah and Bill Thompson as Jock. Thompson also provided the voice for Bull, a rough English Bulldog; and Dachsie, a heavy-accented dachshund. Felton's son Lee Millar provided the voice of Jim Dear and the dog catcher. Bill Baucom, who appeared mostly in Westerns, provided the voice of Trusty, giving the character a distinct Southern drawl.

Alan Reed (who later became the original voice of Fred Flintstone) was the voice of Boris, a Borzoi who speaks with a Russian accent. Dallas McKennon voiced several characters, including Toughy, the stray nondescript mutt; Pedro, a Mexican-accented Chihuahua; and a professor. McKennon also provided a laugh for the hyena in the zoo, which would later be used as a stock sound effect for various media, including the 1979 horror film Tourist Trap, for the jack-in-the-boxes in the 2003 comedy film Elf, and the original "voice" of Ripper Roo in the Crash Bandicoot game series. Stan Freberg was hired by a Disney casting director as the voice of the beaver. While recording the voice, Freberg came up with the beaver's lisp of whistling through his teeth by speaking the lines with a whistle near his mouth to create the effect. On the 2-Disc Platinum Edition DVD, Freberg demonstrated how the whistle effect was done.

While Peggy Lee was initially hired as a songwriter, Disney decided to include her voice into the film, after listening to the demos of the songs she recorded with Sonny Burke. She was entered into a separate contract, signed in October 1952, for her vocal performance. She was also given her own character to voice, named Mame. However, because U.S. First Lady Mamie Eisenhower had a similar-sounding name, Disney thought it would be best to not risk "any comment that wouldn't be befitting a president's wife." Disney then considered renaming the character Peg, which Lee replied to, stating it would be "an honor". Aside from Peg, Lee also voiced Darling and Si and Am, the two Siamese cats.

=== Animation ===
==== Character animation ====
During the September 25, 1945 story conference, Joe Grant suggested that real dogs be brought into the studio for the animators to analyze their physiognomy. This had been done previously on Bambi (1942) when the animators studied actual deer for their physical movement and anatomy. Animator Frank Thomas reflected on the challenge: "Lady and the Tramp was tough to animate because the dogs were like the deer in Bambi: you had to do a realistic, believable animal. You had to have the joints in the right place in the leg, and they had to keep their weight, and you had to keep the right distance from the front leg to the back leg."

By 1952, Hamilton Luske, Wilfred Jackson, and Clyde Geronimi were assigned to direct Lady and the Tramp, all of whom had previously directed Cinderella (1950), Alice in Wonderland (1951), and Peter Pan (1953). Luske brought his family dog, Blondie, to serve as a live-action model for Lady. At one point, a stray dog selected as a reference for Tramp was brought into the studio, but ran away and was not found until several days later. When the film was completed, the dog was relocated to Disneyland, where he lived at the pony farm.

The key supervising animators on the film included seven members of Disney's Nine Old Men—Les Clark, Milt Kahl, Ollie Johnston, Eric Larson, John Lounsbery, Frank Thomas, and Wolfgang Reitherman. Kimball, another member of the "Nine Old Men" who specialized in animating comic characters, did test animations for the Siamese Cat sequence, but they were rejected for being too stylized. Kimball was taken off the project, and Disney assigned him to direct two animated musical shorts: Melody and Toot, Whistle, Plunk and Boom (both released in 1953). The latter short was the first Disney-produced cartoon to be filmed and released in widescreen CinemaScope.

Animator Frank Thomas was assigned the sequence, in which Lady and Tramp enjoy a romantic evening. By accident, Thomas had come across a discarded story reel of the spaghetti-eating scene. Thomas explained, "Walt thought it was distasteful or something or other, but the business that replaced it I thought just didn't give you anything." Thomas called Erdman Penner and decided he would animate the entire scene himself without any lay-outs. Disney was impressed by Thomas's animation and how he romanticized the scene that he kept it in. On viewing the first take of the scene, the animators felt that the action should be slowed down, so an apprentice trainee was assigned to create "half numbers" in between many of the original frames. Backed by the ballad "Bella Notte" sung by George Givot, the animation has since become one of the most indelible romantic scenes in cinema history.

Eric Larson animated the character Peg, among other characters. He became acquainted with the character's voice actress Peggy Lee, and watched her recording sessions. Larson reflected, "She did some of her gestures as she went through the dialogue. I thought, 'God, if I could get a lot of that in the dog, I could at least have some fun with it.'" When he designed the character, Larson took inspiration from Lee and Mae West; Peg's hairstyle was supposedly inspired by Veronica Lake. Disney was impressed with Larson's animation that he selected him to direct Sleeping Beauty (1959), which was simultaneously in production, after Wilfred Jackson had suffered a heart attack.

Wolfgang Reitherman, known for action-driven animation, animated the sequence where Tramp fights several alley dogs and Tramp's fight with the rat in the nursery room. Notably, for the rat fight sequence, Reitherman kept multiple rats in a large cage next to his desk while animating the sequence so he could perfect the rodent's physical movement and behavior. Milt Kahl animated nearly all the dog characters, but primarily focused on Tramp. John Lounsbery worked closely with Kahl on animating Tramp. He also animated Tony and Joe, the respective proprietor and chef of an Italian restaurant, and Bull, an English bulldog. Les Clark animated the scenes of Lady as a puppy.

While reviewing the animation dailies, Disney decided to remove several animators, whom he felt had focused too much attention on detail and had lost sight of the characters. He reassigned them to work on Sleeping Beauty for six months and placed them back on Lady and the Tramp in hopes they would be rejuvenated with "new enthusiasm." To compensate for the production delays, animators had to work six days a week to have the film finished on time.

==== Art direction ====
An early proposed version of Lady and the Tramp was set in San Francisco during the 1906 earthquake. Mary Blair provided early conceptual art for the film during the 1940s, as it was one of the first projects she had worked on for the Disney studios.

However, the film's setting was changed to occur during the turn of the twentieth century in New England, which resonated with Walt Disney. During a 1952 story meeting, Disney affectionately remembered: "In this period—I can remember those days, you know—I lived in a little town in Missouri, and there were only two automobiles. It was 1908. They began to come in then." Claude Coats was then appointed as the key background artist. He explained, "The period was turn-of-the-century Americana, so we made much use of porch furniture of that era, plus the gingerbread ornamentation of the houses, the curly-cue fences, etc."

To create greater authenticity, Coats and the artists studied photographs of older Los Angeles mansions that reflected the ornamented gingerbread architecture within the once-fashionable West Adams neighborhood. To maintain a dog's perspective, Coats built miniature models of the interiors of Jim Dear and Darling's house, and took photos and shot film at a low perspective as reference. Tony Baxter, who was mentored by Coats, further explained: "[He] was trained in architecture so was particularly good at giving credibility to the setting. Coats liked to build models so he could see how things would translate dimensionally." Eyvind Earle (who later became the art director of Disney's Sleeping Beauty) did almost 50 miniature concept sketches for the "Bella Notte" sequence and was a key contributor to the film.

==== CinemaScope ====
Since Lady and the Tramp centered on the titular canines, it was decided the story would be told from a dog's point-of-view. Since the humans affected the storyline, it was decided that only showing the hands and feet of the humans was too obvious when framing the action. It was decided the camera would occasionally show the faces and figures of the humans, but often show them in full view through shadows and silhouettes. This way, the humans would not impose themselves in a dog-centric story.

The widescreen CinemaScope process was developed by 20th Century Fox and was first used in The Robe (1953). The process used specialized lenses to compress the filmed images and spread them into a wider screen projection. This presented a challenge to the layout artists and the character animators. The animators had to remember that they had to move their characters across a background instead of the background passing behind them. Due to the expansion of visual space, it made it difficult for a single character to dominate the screen. Thus, certain groups of characters were spread out to keep the screen from appearing sparse. This resulted in greater realism but offered fewer close-up shots, so longer takes were necessary as the constant jump-cutting would appear too busy or annoying.

Disney's first animated project with CinemaScope was the musical short film Toot, Whistle, Plunk and Boom (1953), directed by Ward Kimball. It won the 1954 Academy Award for Best Animated Short Film. Originally, Lady and the Tramp was to be filmed in a regular 1.37:1 Academy ratio. However, midway through production, Disney decided to have the film projected in CinemaScope, marking Lady and the Tramp as the first full-length animated feature filmed in the process.

Due to the CinemaScope process, it took more time for the layout artists than on previous animated films to frame each shot. As a result, the costs of the background artwork rose, and the film missed its original release date. Near its theatrical release, it was learned that only certain theaters had the capability to project films in CinemaScope at the time. After learning this, Disney issued two versions of the film: one in its native CinemaScope aspect ratio (2.55:1), and another in the Academy ratio. This involved gathering the layout artists to restructure key scenes when characters were on the edges of the screen.

=== Music ===
Lady and the Tramp

Soundtrack album by Various artists
- Released: September 9, 1997
- Genre: Classical
- Length: 48:00
- Label: Walt Disney
- Producer: Ted Kryczko (executive)

Professional ratings
Review scores
Source	Rating
AllMusic	4.5/5 stars

The score for the film was composed and conducted by Oliver Wallace, who had composed music from previous Disney animated films since Dumbo (1941). It was Wallace's last score for a Disney animated film as George Bruns composed the next six scores, starting with Sleeping Beauty (1959) until Robin Hood (1973).

In 1946, Ray Gilbert and Eliot Daniel wrote one unused song titled "I'm Free As the Breeze" for the character Tramp. According to Peggy Lee, it was Sonny Burke, whom she knew as an artists and repertoire (A&R) man at her music label Decca Records, who invited her to participate on Lady and the Tramp. They were contracted in June 1952, whereby they each were paid a flat rate of $1,000 to be split between them. They were entitled to receive royalties from the publishing rights of the music: three cents for "each regular piano copy and/or orchestrations" sold in the U.S. and Canada, and 33 1/3 percent of the net proceeds of international sales outside of Canada.

Lee and Burke won ten songs for Lady and the Tramp, and only six were used. In the film, she sings "La La Lu", "The Siamese Cat Song", and "He's a Tramp". The four unused songs were "Jim Dear," a song written for Darling to express her love for her husband; "Old Trusty," a jazz ballad for the character; and two upbeat tempos about Tramp and his carefree lifestyle: "Singing ('Cause He Wants to Sing)" and "That Fellow's A Friend of Man." For the film's promotional campaign, Lee's involvement was heavily publicized, in which she appeared in the Disneyland television series, explaining her work and singing a few of the film's numbers.

During the film's release, several of the film's songs were featured on several music labels. Lee's recordings for "He's A Tramp" and "The Siamese Cat Song" were released as a single by Decca Records. Nearly a year after the film's release, Decca Records released the vinyl album Songs from Walt Disney's Lady and the Tramp. In 1955, Capitol Records released a children's album, with the script adapted by Alan Livingston. Barbara Luddy, Larry Roberts, and Bill Thompson reprised their roles while June Foray voiced Aunt Sarah, the Siamese cats, and Peg, and Daws Butler voiced Trusty, Jim Dear, and Boris. The remastered soundtrack of Lady and the Tramp was released on CD by Walt Disney Records on September 9, 1997, and was released as a digital download on September 26, 2006.

On August 27, 2015, Disney released an expanded two-disc album as an installment of The Legacy Collection series to coincide with the film's 60th anniversary. The first disc includes the film's complete original soundtrack. The second disc included one demo recording, two Lost Chords recordings, and six tracks from the 1962 Disneyland Records vinyl album Lady and the Tramp: All the Songs from the Motion Picture.

==== Songs ====
Original songs performed in the film include:

No.	Title	Performer(s)	Length
1.	"Main Title (Bella Notte)"	The Disney Studio Chorus
2.	"Peace on Earth"	Donald Novis
3.	"What Is a Baby"	Barbara Luddy
4.	"La La Lu"	Peggy Lee
5.	"The Siamese Cat Song"	Peggy Lee
6.	"Bella Notte"	George Givot & The Disney Studio Chorus
7.	"He's a Tramp"	Peggy Lee & The Mellomen
8.	"Finale (Peace on Earth)"	The Disney Studio Chorus

== Release ==
An episode of the Disneyland television series titled "A Story of Dogs" aired on ABC on December 1, 1954. The first half of the episode, hosted by Walt Disney, was specifically devoted to Lady and the Tramp. The episode featured appearances from animators Wolfgang Reitherman, Frank Thomas, and Milt Kahl; co-director Clyde Geronimi, and story artist Erdman Penner. The episode re-aired on May 25, 1955 and later on July 20, 1955.

Another Disneyland episode titled "Cavalcade of Songs" was originally broadcast on February 16, 1955 to promote the film. The episode featured a staged "behind-the-scenes" look, featuring Peggy Lee and Sonny Burke being shown through the storyboards by Joe Rinaldi and Erdman Penner to discuss placement of the songs to advance the narrative. A vignette of Lee and Burke is next shown composing and recording "The Siamese Cat Song" and lastly, a mock recording session is shown of Lee recording "He's a Tramp" with the Mellomen.

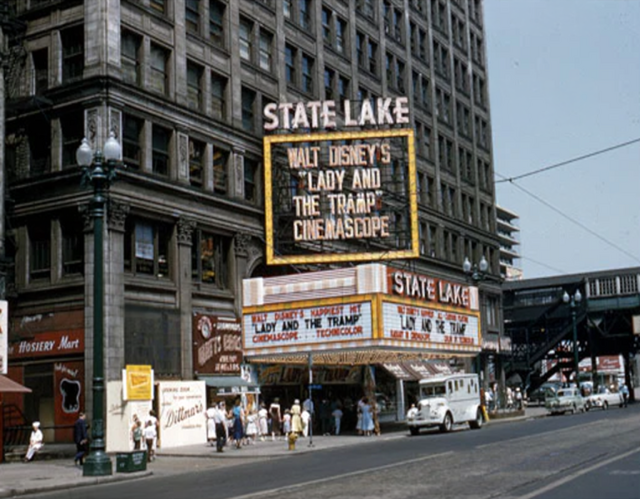
Lady and the Tramp playing at the State-Lake Theater in Chicago

=== Original theatrical run ===
Lady and the Tramp held its world premiere at the State-Lake Theatre in Chicago on June 16, 1955. It was released in general theaters on June 22. The film was paired as a double feature with the short subject documentary Switzerland of the People & Places film series.

During its initial release, Lady and the Tramp took in a higher figure than any other Disney animated feature since Snow White and the Seven Dwarfs (1937), earning an estimated $6.5 million in distributor rentals.

=== Re-releases ===
Lady and the Tramp was first re-released in 1962 on a double bill with Almost Angels. According to The New York Times, the film earned roughly between $6 to $7 million. The film was re-released in December 1971, and in most markets, the film was paired with The Million Dollar Duck. This release earned $10 million. It was re-released for a third time in 1980 for the film's 25th anniversary, whereby it grossed $27 million. During its fourth re-release, in 1986, Lady and the Tramp grossed $31.1 million.

Lady and the Tramp also played a limited engagement in select Cinemark Theatres from February 16–18, 2013. Lady and the Tramp has had a domestic lifetime gross of $93.6 million, and a lifetime international gross of $187 million.

=== Home media ===
Lady and the Tramp was first released on North American VHS cassette and Laserdisc on October 7, 1987, as part of the Walt Disney Classics video series and in the United Kingdom in 1990. During the home video transfer, technicians for Walt Disney Home Video used a pan-and-scan of the CinemaScope version rather than use the theatrical Academy version.

To promote the 1987 release, Disney launched a $20 million promotional campaign of television and print advertisements. They also partnered with McDonald's and the American Dairy Association. McDonald's offered a three-dollar discount for a videocassette copy, and consumers saved $4.25 ($12 in 2025 dollars) on the videocassette when purchasing milk. When the release went into moratorium on March 31, 1988, the film was estimated to have sold more than three million copies. By early 1988, it was the best-selling VHS title at the time, in which the estimated video sales generated $60 million. Its record was then surpassed by Cinderella (1950), which sold 7.5 million copies and earned $100 million in sales in 1988.

It was re-released on THX-certified VHS and Laserdisc on September 15, 1998, as part of the Walt Disney Masterpiece Collection video series. The VHS master used the original Academy ratio, while the LaserDisc presented the film in its widescreen format. The film was issued on DVD as part of the Disney Limited Issue series on November 23, 1999 for a sixty-day time period.

Lady and the Tramp was remastered and restored for DVD on February 28, 2006, as the seventh installment of Disney's Platinum Editions series. On its first day, one million copies of the Platinum Edition were sold. The Platinum Edition DVD went on moratorium on January 31, 2007, along with the 2006 DVD re-issue of the film's sequel Lady and the Tramp II: Scamp's Adventure (2001).

Lady and the Tramp was released on Blu-ray on February 7, 2012, as a part of Disney's Diamond Editions series. A standalone 1-disc DVD edition was released on March 20, 2012.

Lady and the Tramp was re-released on Digital HD on February 20, 2018, and on Blu-ray February 27, 2018, as part of the Walt Disney Signature Collection line.

==== Lawsuit ====
Peggy Lee, who had originally been paid $3,500, was asked to help promote the 1987 VHS release, for which she was paid an honorarium for $500. Lee contended Disney had breached the 1952 contract she had signed with the studio, which denied Disney the right to make "transcriptions for sale to the public" without her approval. Disney CEO Michael Eisner refused to pay Lee her share of the royalties. On November 16, 1988, Lee sued the Walt Disney Company for breach of contract, claiming that she retained the rights to transcriptions of the music, arguing that videotape editions were transcriptions. Her lawyers demanded $50 million in damages for compensation. In March 1991, Lee was awarded $2.3 million for breach of contract, plus $500,000 for unjust enrichment, $600,000 for illegal use of Lee's voice and $400,000 for the use of her name. From the $72 million Disney had earned in videocassette sales, by 1995, Lee's award was estimated to be four percent of the sales.

In October 1992, the California Court of Appeals upheld the judgement that Disney had to pay Lee over $3 million in compensation. Though videocassettes did not exist when Lee signed her contract with Disney, she nevertheless had retained the rights to phonograph recordings and transcriptions of the film. Stephen Lachs, a Los Angeles County Superior Court judge, later ruled that videocassettes were considered under the category of transcriptions. In December 1992, the California Supreme Court denied a hearing on Disney's appeal of lower-court rulings, which upheld the studio had committed breach of contract.

== Reception ==
=== Critical reaction ===
During its initial release, the film initially received mixed reviews from critics. Bosley Crowther of The New York Times claimed the film was "not the best [Disney] has done in this line. The sentimentality is mighty, and the CinemaScope size does not make for any less aware of the thickness of the goo. It also magnifies the animation, so that the flaws and poor foreshortening are more plain. Unfortunately, and surprisingly, the artists' work is below par in this film." Time wrote "Walt Disney has for so long parlayed gooey sentiment and stark horror into profitable cartoons that most moviegoers are apt to be more surprised than disappointed to discover that the combination somehow does not work this time." John McCarten of The New Yorker felt the story was handled "with a sentimentality that Albert Payson Terhune might have found excessive" and wrote the two lead characters were unappealing. McCarten also criticized the film's CinemaScope process, writing it gave the characters "the dimensions of hippos."

Gene Arneel of Variety deemed the film "a delight for the juveniles [and] lots of fun for adults". Edwin Schallert of the Los Angeles Times described the film as a "delightful, haunting, charmed fantasy that is remarkably enriched with music and, incidentally, with rare conversations among the canine characters." Harrison's Reports felt the "scintillating musical score and several songs, the dialogue and the voices, the behaviors and expressions of the different characters, the mellow turn-of-the-century backgrounds, the beautiful color and sweep of the CinemaScope process — all these add up to one of the most enjoyable cartoon features Disney has ever made." Mildred Martin of The Philadelphia Inquirer called the film "delightfully written, quaintly drawn" and stated it "could easily become a screen classic." Dorothy Masters of the New York Daily News wrote Lady and the Tramp was "another great work of art, a masterpiece not only by virtue of unerring brush and magnificent color, but because the cartoon genius [Walt Disney] has now perfected his art to the point of making two-dimensional animals more human than people."

The sequence of Lady and Tramp sharing a plate of spaghetti – climaxed by an accidental kiss as they swallow opposite ends of the same strand of spaghetti – is considered an iconic scene in American film history.

Gene Siskel and Roger Ebert gave the film a positive review on their show At the Movies when it was re-released in 1986, with Ebert in particular praising the opening scene of Lady as a puppy calling it one of the greatest animated sequences Disney ever did. Dave Kehr, writing for The Chicago Tribune gave the film four stars. In a Los Angeles Times review, Charles Solomon, an animation historian, called the animation "wonderfully polished" and felt it will be regarded as "a timeless film that audiences will still enjoy 31 years from now." The sequence of Lady and Tramp sharing a plate of spaghetti – climaxed by an accidental kiss as they swallow opposite ends of the same strand of spaghetti – is considered an iconic scene in American film history. On the review aggregator website Rotten Tomatoes, 91% of 46 critics' reviews are positive. The website's consensus reads: "A nostalgic charmer, Lady and the Tramp's token sweetness is mighty but the songs and richly colored animation are technically superb and make for a memorable experience." Metacritic, which uses a weighted average, assigned the film a score of 78 out of 100, based on 15 critics, indicating "generally favorable" reviews.

Lady and the Tramp contains several instances of ethnic and cultural stereotyping. The depiction of the pair of Siamese cats in particular has been recognized for its racist Asian stereotypes. "The Siamese Cat Song" was cut from the 2019 live-action remake of the film, and in 2020 Disney+ included a content warning at the beginning of the film, advising viewers of "negative depictions and/or mistreatment of people or cultures".

Lady and the Tramp was named number 95 out of the "100 Greatest Love Stories of All Time" by the American Film Institute in their 100 Years...100 Passions special, as one of only two animated films to appear on the list, along with Disney's Beauty and the Beast which ranked 34th. In 2010, Rhapsody called its accompanying soundtrack one of the all-time great Disney and Pixar soundtracks. In June 2011, Time magazine named it one of "The 25 All-TIME Best Animated Films".

=== Accolades ===
Year	Ceremony	Award	Result
1956	BAFTA Awards	Best Animated Film	Nominated
1956	David di Donatello Awards	Best Foreign Producer; (Walt Disney)	Won
2006	Satellite Awards	Best Youth DVD	Nominated

==== American Film Institute Lists ====
- AFI's 100 Years...100 Passions – No. 95

== Other media ==
=== Comics ===
- From October 31, 1955 to June 25, 1988, Scamp comic strip was published by King Feature Syndicate.
- The comic book was also published by Dell Comics' first issue being Four Color No. 703 (May 1956); this turned into a regular comic book series which had No. 16 issues ending in December 1960. A second series was launched by Gold Key Comics in 1967–1979; which ran for 45 issues.

=== Sequel ===
In June 1998, Disney had announced a sequel to Lady and the Tramp was in development. The film's songs were composed by Melissa Manchester and Norman Gimbel. Titled Lady and the Tramp II: Scamp's Adventure, it centers on the adventures of Lady and Tramp's only son, Scamp, who desires to be a wild dog. He runs away from his family and joins a gang of junkyard dogs to fulfill his longing for freedom and a life without rules. Produced by Disney Television Animation and Disney Video Premiere, Scamp's Adventure was released on February 27, 2001.

=== Live-action remake ===
Walt Disney Pictures produced a live-action remake of the film with Justin Theroux and Tessa Thompson in the voice roles of Tramp and Lady respectively. The movie premiered on Disney's new streaming service, Disney+, on its US launch date of November 12, 2019 to mixed reviews.

=== Other animated productions ===
The characters of the film have recurring cameo appearances in the television series House of Mouse, as well as in its direct-to-video films Mickey's Magical Christmas and Mickey's House of Villains.

The Beaver (voiced by Carson Minniear) has a minor role in the 2026 Lego special Lego Disney Princess: Magical Mayhem.

=== Video games ===
In the Kingdom Hearts games, a statue of Lady and Tramp appears in a fountain in Traverse Town.

In the world builder game Disney Magic Kingdoms, Lady, Tramp, Tony, Joe, Jock and Trusty appear as playable characters, along with some attractions based on locations of the film. In the game the characters are involved in new storylines that serve as a continuation of the film.

=== Disney Parks and Resorts ===
Walt Disney wanted the setting of the film to be Marceline, Missouri which had been his childhood hometown. Whilst Lady and the Tramp was in production, Walt was also designing Disneyland in California and styled the Main Street, U.S.A. area of the park to Marceline. Tony's Town Square Restaurant is an Italian restaurant inspired by Lady and the Tramp and is located on Main Street, U.S.A. at Walt Disney World, whilst the Pizzeria Bella Notte restaurant is in Fantasyland at Disneyland Paris.

== See also ==
- 1955 in film
- List of American films of 1955
- List of Walt Disney Pictures films
- List of Disney theatrical animated features
- List of animated feature films of the 1950s
- List of highest-grossing animated films

== Bibliography ==
- Barrier, Michael (1999). Hollywood Cartoons: American Animation in Its Golden Age. Oxford University Press. ISBN 978-0-1980-2079-0.
- Barrier, Michael (2007). The Animated Man: A Life of Walt Disney. University of California Press. ISBN 978-0-5202-5619-4.
- Beck, Jerry (2005). The Animated Movie Guide. Chicago Review Press. ISBN 978-1-5565-2591-9.
- Bohn, James (2017). Music in Disney's Animated Features: Snow White and the Seven Dwarfs to The Jungle Book. University Press of Mississippi. ISBN 978-1-4968-1215-5.
- Broomfield-McHugh, Dominic; Montgomery, Colleen, eds. (2025). The Oxford Handbook of the Disney Musical. Oxford University Press. ISBN 978-0-197-63349-6.
- Canemaker, John (1996). Before the Animation Begins: The Art and Lives of Disney Inspirational Sketch Artists. Hyperion Books. ISBN 978-0-7868-6152-1.
- Canemaker, John (2001). Walt Disney's Nine Old Men and the Art of Animation. Disney Editions. ISBN 978-0-7868-6496-6.
- Canemaker, John (2010). Two Guys Named Joe: Master Animation Storytellers Joe Grant & Joe Ranft. New York: Disney Editions. ISBN 978-1-4231-1067-5.
- Cotter, Bill (1997). The Wonderful World of Disney Television: A Complete History. New York: Disney Enterprises. ISBN 0-7868-6359-5.
- Deja, Andreas (2015). The Nine Old Men: Lessons, Techniques, and Inspiration from Disney's Great Animators. Routledge. ISBN 978-1-1350-1586-2.
- Finch, Christopher (2004) [1973]. The Art of Walt Disney: From Mickey Mouse to the Magic Kingdoms (Revised and Expanded ed.). New York: Harry N. Abrams. ISBN 0-8109-4964-4.
- Gabler, Neal (2006). Walt Disney: The Triumph of the American Imagination. Vintage Books. ISBN 978-0-6797-5747-4.
- Ghez, Didier (2016). They Drew As they Pleased: The Hidden Art of Disney's Musical Years (The 1940s - Part One). Chronicle Books LLC. ISBN 978-1-4521-3744-5.
- Ghez, Didier (2018). They Drew As They Pleased Vol 4: The Hidden Art of Disney's Mid-Century Era (The 1950s and 1960s). Chronicle Books LLC. ISBN 978-1-4521-6413-7.
- Grover, Ron (1997). The Disney Touch: Disney, ABC & the Quest for the World's Greatest Media Empire (Revised ed.). Chicago: Irwin Professional Pub. ISBN 978-0-786-31172-9.
- Hischak, Thomas (2011). Disney Voice Actors: A Biographical Dictionary. Jefferson, North Carolina: McFarland & Company. ISBN 978-0-7864-6271-1.
- Holt, Nathalia (2019). The Queens of Animation: The Untold Story of the Women Who Transformed the World of Disney and Made Cinematic History. Little, Brown and Company. ISBN 978-0316439152.
- Koenig, David (1997). Mouse Under Glass: Secrets of Disney Animation & Theme Parks. Bonaventure Press. ISBN 978-0-9640-6051-7.
- Lee, Peggy (1989). Miss Peggy Lee: An Autobiography. New York: Donald I. Fine. ISBN 978-1-556-11112-9.
- Maltin, Leonard (1987). Of Mice and Magic: A History of American Animated Cartoons. Plume. ISBN 978-0-4522-5993-5.
- Maltin, Leonard (1995). The Disney Films. Disney Editions. ISBN 978-0-7868-8527-5.
- Newcomb, Horace (1994). Television: The Critical View (Fifth ed.). Oxford University Press. ISBN 0-19-511927-4.
- Peri, Don (2008). Working with Walt: Interviews with Disney Artists. University Press of Mississippi. ISBN 978-1-604-73023-4.
- Peri, Don; Docter, Pete (2024). Directing at Disney: The Original Directors of Walt's Animated Films. New York: Disney Editions. ISBN 978-1-484-75574-7.
- Platthaus, Andreas (2020). "Creating Enchantment: The Making of Lady and the Tramp". In Kothenschulte, Daniel (ed.). The Walt Disney Film Archives: The Animated Movies 1921–1968. Taschen. ISBN 978-3-8365-8086-1.
- Smith, Dave (2012). Disney Trivia from the Vault: Secrets Revealed and Questions Answered. Disney Editions. ISBN 978-1-4231-7857-6.
- Thomas, Bob (1958). Walt Disney, the Art of Animation. Simon & Schuster.
- Thomas, Bob (1994). Walt Disney: An American Original. Hyperion Press. ISBN 0-7868-6027-8.
- Thomas, Bob (1997). Disney's Art of Animation: From Mickey Mouse To Hercules. Disney Editions. ISBN 978-0-7868-6241-2.
- Thomas, Frank; Johnston, Ollie (1981). Disney Animation: The Illusion of Life. Abbeville Press. ISBN 978-0-7868-6070-8.
- Thomas, Frank; Johnston, Ollie (1993). The Disney Villain. Disney Editions. ISBN 978-1-5628-2792-2.
- Webb, Graham (2011). The Animated Film Encyclopedia: A Complete Guide to American Shorts, Features and Sequences, 1900-1999. McFarland & Company. ISBN 978-0-7864-4985-9.
- Williams, Pat; Denney, Jim (2004). How to Be Like Walt: Capturing the Disney Magic Every Day of Your Life. Deerfield Beach, FL: Health Communications. ISBN 978-0-7573-0231-2.
