= Larry Roberts (actor) =

American actor (1926–1992)

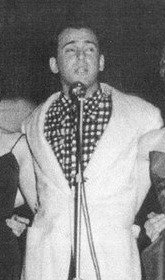
- Roberts in 1953
- Born: Lawrence Saltzman; September 28, 1926; Cleveland, Ohio, U.S.
- Died: July 17, 1992 (aged 65); New York City, U.S.
- Occupation: Actor
- Years active: 1947–1955
- Known for: Original voice of Tramp in Lady and the Tramp

Larry Roberts (September 28, 1926 – July 17, 1992) was an American actor who was most active during the 1950s. Roberts is best known for his role of playing the voice of Tramp in Lady and the Tramp. Roberts was little known for other roles, although he did play some minor uncredited roles in Bandstand Revue and Ace High-Hits.

== Biography ==
=== Early life ===
Larry Roberts was born Lawrence Saltzman on September 28, 1926. He was the only child of Robert E. and Mabel (Haber) Saltzman. He was a native of Cleveland, Ohio. After his parents divorced, his father moved to Los Angeles. During World War II, Roberts served with General Patton's Third Army in France, Germany, and Austria. After his military service, Roberts went to Los Angeles on vacation, but stayed there to help organize the Circle Theatre. He performed with this group under the name Larry Salters, appearing in 1947 in the company's debut production of Ethan Frome as Jotham Powell. Roberts went on to appear in five of the company's first six productions. He appeared in a revival of the play The Time of Your Life playing the aspiring "hoofer" Harry, a role originated on Broadway by Gene Kelly.

In 1949, Roberts went on to create and become part-owner of the Players Ring, another prominent Hollywood theater group of the day. At some point in his onstage career, he was discovered for the role of Tramp in Lady and the Tramp when a Disney story man saw him performing.

=== Korean War and main career ===
Roberts was actively involved in providing entertainment for the troops in the Korean War; he frequently participated in USO tours to entertain troops, who liked his performance. In 1955, for his efforts, he was awarded a "Certificate of Esteem" by then-United States Secretary of Defense Charles E. Wilson.

Roberts was a popular guest on many variety shows in the early days of television, including Lights, Camera, Action!, Bandstand Revue, The All-Star Revue, and several of the Pinky Lee television shows. He also did a stint in Las Vegas as a stand-up comic. His singing voice was captured on several recordings he made during the fifties with Neely Plumb and his Orchestra on the "Ace-Hi Hits" label. Among his recordings for Ace-Hi were "April in Portugal", "Big Mamou", "Tell Me a Story", and "Wild Horses".

=== Later years and death ===
Roberts retired from show business in the mid to late 1950s and returned to Cleveland. He re-assumed the last name Salters and went into the ladies' clothing business. He first worked for Bobbie Brooks, Inc., a company founded by his uncle, Maurice Saltzman. He then moved to New York City and was a designer for Russ Togs, another ladies' clothing manufacturer.

Roberts died of AIDS-related causes on July 17, 1992, at his home in New York City. Roberts was 65 years old.

== Filmography ==
Year	Title	Role	Notes
1950	Lights, Camera, Action!	Unknown role	TV series, 1 episode
1955	Lady and the Tramp	Tramp	Voice
1955	Damon Runyon Theater	Unknown role	TV series, 1 episode, (final appearance)
