= Walt Disney Studios Home Entertainment =

Distribution arm of the Walt Disney Company

Buena Vista Home Entertainment, Inc.
- Logo used since 2012
- Trade name: Walt Disney Studios Home Entertainment
- Formerly: Buena Vista Home Video (1987–1993); Buena Vista Home Video, Inc. (1993–1997); Buena Vista Home Entertainment, Inc. (1997–2007) (Note: Buena Vista Home Entertainment still exists as a legal name for Walt Disney Studios Home Entertainment since 2007.); Disney Videos (Internationally; 1995–2005)
- Type: Subsidiary
- Industry: Home entertainment
- Founded: February 13, 1987; 39 years ago
- Defunct: April 14, 2026; 7 months ago
- Fate: Closed; exists only as a brand label
- Headquarters: Walt Disney Studios, Burbank, California, United States
- Area served: Worldwide
- Key people: Tony Chambers (EVP, Theatrical Distribution)
- Brands: Disney; Pixar; Marvel Studios; Lucasfilm; 20th Century; Searchlight Pictures
- Services: Physical distribution (1987–2024), digital distribution
- Parent: Buena Vista Pictures Distribution (1987–1994); Walt Disney Television and Telecommunications (1994–1996); Walt Disney Studios (1996–2026); Disney Platform Distribution
- Website: Disney Movies At Home

Buena Vista Home Entertainment, Inc. (doing business as Walt Disney Studios Home Entertainment) is the home entertainment label and former distribution arm of the Walt Disney Company. It once handled the distribution of Disney's films, television series, and other audiovisual content across digital formats and platforms.

For 37 years, Buena Vista Home Entertainment handled autonomous distribution of those properties in several physical home media formats, such as VHSs, DVDs, Blu-ray discs, and 4K discs under various brand labels around the world. It was founded on February 13, 1987, as Buena Vista Home Video. It was renamed to its current legal name in 1997, although it is currently known in the UK as Walt Disney Studios Home Entertainment (UK & Ireland) since 2013. The division adopted the current Walt Disney Studios-branding in its public name in 2007, but kept the Buena Vista branding for corporate use.

Since 2024, Sony Pictures Home Entertainment handles physical production and distribution for all film titles released by Walt Disney Studios Home Entertainment in the United States and Canada. The division continued to operate until April 14, 2026, when Disney laid off its entire staff.

== History ==
=== Background ===
Before Disney began releasing home video titles itself, it licensed some titles to MCA's DiscoVision label for their newly developed disc format, later called LaserDisc. Disney's agreement with MCA ended in December 1981.

In 1980, Disney established its own video distribution operation as part of Walt Disney Telecommunications and Non-Theatrical Company (WDTNT) with Jim Jimirro as its first president. Home video was not considered to be a major market by Disney at the time. WDTNT Co. also handled marketing of other miscellaneous ancillary items such as short 8 mm films for home movies.

Disney's first releases on videotape were 13 titles that were licensed for rental to Fotomat on March 4, 1980, initially in a four-city test (Chicago, Houston, Philadelphia, and San Francisco/Oakland/San Jose), to be expanded nationwide by the end of 1980. The agreement specified rental fees ranging from $7.95 to $13.95.

Disney was unusual among the major studios in offering a program for authorized rentals. Most of the other studios involved in the videocassette market at the time were trying to find ways to stop dealers from renting out their movie tapes. Magnetic Video (which had titles from 20th Century Fox and others) ceased doing business with Fotomat after they began renting Magnetic Video cassettes without authorization.

In the late 1980s, Disney began seeking other outlets to distribute its video, and signed deals with mass-merchant retailers such as Target, Caldor, and Wal-Mart. Around this time, the studio began partnering with major retailers for advertising campaigns.

=== Walt Disney Home Video ===
The first Disney animated feature to be released on videocassette was Dumbo on June 28, 1981, for rental only. The Many Adventures of Winnie the Pooh was released for rental and sale at the same time. Alice in Wonderland was released on October 15, 1981, for rental only. Fun and Fancy Free was released in 1982 as 'Fun and Fancy Free' Featuring: Mickey and the Beanstalk, to capitalize on the best-known segment of the film.

Their agreement with DiscoVision having ended in 1981, Disney began releasing LaserDiscs under the Walt Disney Home Video label to their own network of distributors and dealers. The first five titles were shipped in June 1982: The Black Hole, The Love Bug, Escape to Witch Mountain, The Many Adventures of Winnie the Pooh, and Mickey Mouse and Donald Duck Cartoons, Collection One. Five more titles shipped in July: Pete's Dragon, Dumbo, Davy Crockett and the River Pirates, The One and Only, Genuine, Original Family Band, and Mickey Mouse and Donald Duck Cartoons, Collection Two.

Disney released more cartoon compilations (pre-Walt Disney Cartoon Classics in 1983) in late 1981, including Goofy Over Sports and A Tale of Two Critters.

Dumbo was released for sale on tape in summer 1982, while Alice in Wonderland was released for sale in November 1982. The next major animated feature to be released (excluding the "package" anthology features) was Robin Hood on December 3, 1984, starting the Walt Disney Classics collection. By 1982, all the video releases were for sale and rental, along with newer releases, but at high prices.

July 16, 1985 saw the home video premiere of Pinocchio which became the bestselling video of that year. Later, the Making Your Dreams Come True promotion started on November 6, 1985 with repackaged live action titles. In addition, Dumbo was released on the same day.

=== Buena Vista Home Video ===
The name Buena Vista Home Video originated as a label of WDTNT in 1983, originally used to distribute tapes of Hopalong Cassidy. Soon, BVHV became the label utilized for a variety of miscellaneous content; such content included animation not created by Disney (such as Rocky and Bullwinkle and Alvin and the Chipmunks), concerts and other adult music titles, and various special-interest programs, including The Very Best of The Ed Sullivan Show. Buena Vista Home Video was legally incorporated on February 13, 1987. The "Buena Vista" name was adopted from Buena Vista Pictures Distribution, who also acted as copyright holder for video tapes released directly under the BVHE banner.

In November 1992, Buena Vista Home Video entered into a worldwide joint venture with Jim Henson Productions to form Jim Henson Video, which distributed Henson-owned material, including various Muppet productions; the company had previously distributed Muppet content in the United States from 1983 to 1985 under the Muppet Home Video label. This lasted until late 1997. The following year, the label moved to Sony Pictures' Columbia TriStar Home Video division, and was renamed Jim Henson Home Entertainment.

In July 1993, Buena Vista Home Video signed a multimillion-dollar multiyear North American licensing deal with DIC Entertainment. The deal included over 1,000 half-hours worth of animated content from DIC, alongside the creation of the DIC Toon Time Video label and interactive and multimedia opportunities. In December 1993, Buena Vista Home Video's European Spanish unit signed a distribution deal with Acclaim Entertainment for the distribution of Acclaim's video game titles in Spain.

In April 1996, due to ongoing realignment stemming from Disney's merger with Capital Cities/ABC, Buena Vista Home Video was transferred out of the Disney Television and Telecommunications group to The Walt Disney Studios. In August 1996, Disney and Tokuma Shoten Publishing entered a deal wherein Buena Vista Home Video would acquire the worldwide home media distribution rights to the Studio Ghibli animated films. Disney would go on to produce the English dubs and distribute 15 of Ghibli's films, through the Walt Disney Pictures, Buena Vista Home Video, Miramax and Touchstone Pictures banners.

In July 1998, Buena Vista Home Entertainment entered into a distribution agreement with Warner Home Video where the latter would distribute over 100 Disney/Touchstone/Hollywood titles on DVD in Europe and Australia until the end of 2000. The distribution of VHS releases, however, remained under Disney's full control.

In 2000, following Andy Heyward's purchase of DIC back from Disney, DIC's rights with BVHE expired. With this, DIC later signed a new deal with Lions Gate Home Entertainment in 2001.

In 2001, Disney acquired Fox Family Worldwide (including Fox Family, the Fox Kids brand and Saban Entertainment). A year later in 2002, Saban became BVS Entertainment and BVHE took distribution over from 20th Century Fox Home Entertainment.

In 2005, Roger Corman-owned production company New Concorde signed a distribution deal with Buena Vista Home Entertainment, giving BVHE home video distribution rights to 400 Corman-produced films, including the pre-1984 New World Pictures library until 2008.

=== Walt Disney Studios Home Entertainment ===
As part of a broader company-wide effort, Buena Vista Home Entertainment dropped the "Buena Vista" branding in 2007 and was renamed as Walt Disney Studios Home Entertainment. However, the division retained Buena Vista as its legal corporate name until May 2024. In 2013, Disney acquired the rights to the first four Marvel Cinematic Universe films produced by Marvel Studios from original distributor Paramount Pictures.

In 2012, following the acquisition of Lucasfilm, Disney began releasing their titles starting with the late 2014 release of the first season of Star Wars Rebels. However, the rights to the original and prequel trilogies of Star Wars remained with 20th Century Fox, until 2019 when Fox was acquired by Disney; originally, the rights to the films were to transfer to Disney in May 2020, with the exception of A New Hope, which would have remained with Fox in perpetuity.

In July 2017, GKIDS and Shout! Studios acquired the North America home video rights of the Studio Ghibli films from Disney. However, Disney still handles home video distribution of the company's films in Japan.

In March 2019, Disney acquired 21st Century Fox's film assets, and in January 2020, 20th Century Home Entertainment was folded into Walt Disney Studios Home Entertainment. As a result, all film titles from 20th Century Studios and Searchlight Pictures began to be distributed by Disney for home media formats. Additionally, Disney temporarily took over distribution of Metro-Goldwyn Mayer’s home video titles for the remainder of MGM's existing agreement with 20th Century Fox. This arrangement lasted until June 30, 2020, after which MGM's home video distribution shifted to Warner Bros. Home Entertainment in 2022.

=== Licensing agreements, later years, and closure ===
Following the launch of Disney+ in 2019 and its international expansion in the following years, Walt Disney Studios Home Entertainment has begun to discontinue physical distribution entirely in certain regions such as Latin America, Australia, New Zealand, India, the Middle East, Portugal, Asia (except Japan), Hungary, Russia, Greece, and Romania, or to let other companies distribute in certain international markets like the United Kingdom and Ireland (Elevation Sales (Note: Disney first licensed its home video distribution in the UK to The Rank Organisation in 1988 under Rank Home Video while theatrical distribution were distributed by Warner Bros. UK at the same time. By 1989, Disney began its autonomous UK home video distribution. And in 1992, Buena Vista International was revived in the region after its distribution deal with Warner Bros. expired that year. However, Warner Bros. returns to distribute Disney films in the United Kingdom and Europe between 1998 and 2000 but on physical DVDs instead. After 34 years of self-distributing films on home video in the UK, Disney licensed its home video distribution in the region to Elevation Sales – a joint-venture between StudioCanal and Lionsgate – since October 1, 2023. Overall, this makes Elevation the third licensing physical distribution partner for Disney after Rank Home Video (VHS only) and Warner Home Video (DVD only).)), Poland (Galapagos), Czech Republic (Magic Box), Spain (Divisa Films), Italy (Eagle Pictures), Scandinavia (SF Studios), France and Benelux (ESC Distribution), Germany and Austria (Leonine Studios), and Japan (Happinet).

On January 23, 2023, Disney entered a multi-year home entertainment distribution deal with Mill Creek Entertainment, where upon Mill Creek agreed to distribute hundreds of select physical releases from the ABC Signature, 20th Television, Hollywood Pictures, Touchstone Pictures, and 20th Century Studios catalog libraries.

In February 2024, Disney entered into a home video distribution agreement with Sony Pictures Home Entertainment, in which Sony would handle all physical media production and distribution for Disney's home entertainment assets in North America. After 37 years as an in-house physical media distribution label, WDSHE would continue only as an in-house physical media production label. As a result of the deal, the Disney Movie Club was shut down on May 20, 2024. The first Disney film to be distributed by Sony was 20th Century's The First Omen on July 30, 2024.

On April 14, 2026, Disney had laid off approximately 1,000 employees, including the entire staff of Walt Disney Studios Home Entertainment, effectively closing the division's operations. It now currently exists as a copyright holder managing the home entertainment rights to its titles for licensing.

== Formats ==
=== Moratorium practices ===
Disney is notable for implementing a longtime moratorium practice on its film library, known in the industry as the "Disney Vault". Disney has stated that this practice of moratorium is done to both control their market and to allow the studio's films to be reissued for subsequent generations of viewers. This practice was extended to the 20th Century Fox library, after its acquisition by Disney in early 2019.

=== Disney DVD ===
The Disney DVD logo.

Disney DVD is the brand name under which Buena Vista Home Entertainment distributes its Disney-branded releases. Disney began working on title releases for DVDs in 1997, although they were not released in this format in the United Kingdom until early 1998. Disney's first DVD release in the United States was George of the Jungle in 1997. Disney's final VHS release was Cars on February 19, 2007.

=== Disney Blu-ray ===
The Disney Blu-ray logo.

Disney Blu-ray is the brand name under which Buena Vista Home Entertainment distributes its Disney-branded releases in high-definition. In late 2006, Disney began releasing titles, like the Pirates of the Caribbean films, the National Treasure films, and the first two Narnia films on Blu-ray.

In late 2010, Walt Disney Studios Home Entertainment began releasing their 3D movies in the Blu-ray 3D format, starting with A Christmas Carol and Alice in Wonderland. In 2017, Walt Disney Studios Home Entertainment quietly discontinued releasing new titles in the format in North America, presumably due to the declining interest in the 3D format at home in the region. Despite this, Walt Disney Studios Home Entertainment continues to release new 3D titles in the format in other regions, mostly in Europe such as the United Kingdom since 2010. In 2023, Disney released Avatar: The Way of Water for the Blu-ray 3D through its 20th Century label.

=== Disney Second Screen ===
A new feature that was included in the Diamond Edition of Bambi on March 1, 2011, "Disney Second Screen" is a feature accessible via a computer or iPad app download that provides additional content as the user views the film. Disney Second Screen syncs along with the movie, and as the film plays, interactive elements such as trivia, photo galleries, and animated flipbooks appear on the iPad or computer screen. The service was discontinued since October 2, 2016.

=== Ultra HD Blu-ray ===
Disney began releasing their new films on Ultra HD Blu-ray starting with Marvel's Guardians of the Galaxy Vol. 2 on August 22, 2017. Touchstone Pictures' The Prestige was Disney's first catalog release on UHD, released on December 19, 2017.

== See also ==
- List of Disney theatrical animated feature films
- List of Disney feature-length home entertainment releases
- Lists of Walt Disney Studios films
- Walt Disney Pictures
- List of remakes and adaptations of Disney animated films
