= Moratorium (entertainment) =

Time-limited release of media

A moratorium is the practice of suspending the sales of films on home video DVD, VHS, and Blu-ray and boxed sets after a certain period of time. Walt Disney Studios Home Entertainment was famous for this practice, known as the "Disney Vault," in which it would only sporadically sell home videos of animated films in the Disney catalogue, until 2019 when a program of undeletions and re-releases ultimately restored all Disney titles into simultaneous print on home entertainment for the first time and on the Disney+ streaming service. The 20th Century Fox film library (with the notable exception of The Rocky Horror Picture Show) was placed into moratorium and removed from theaters following Disney's acquisition of 21st Century Fox in 2019 according to a Vulture article; the decision noted the different policies between Fox, which had made most of its film archive available to theaters at all times, and Disney, which did (and does) not.

== History ==
Disney was the first studio to put its films on moratorium. In 2002, Universal Pictures used this practice with the release of the Back to the Future DVD boxed set due to widescreen framing problems. George Lucas also used this practice with the 2004 Star Wars original trilogy DVD boxed set. However, the moratorium was lifted on Back to the Future in 2009 before the release of the 25th anniversary Blu-ray set on October 26, 2010, and on Star Wars, once Star Wars: Episode III – Revenge of the Sith was released to theatres on May 19, 2005, and releasing the original theatrical versions of the original trilogy on DVD on September 12, 2006.

== Controls ==
Disney itself stated that the practice of moratorium was done to both control their market and to allow Disney films to be fresh for new generations of young children.

The practice of moratorium has been frowned upon by consumers because it forces higher sale prices. A normal DVD that is sold under moratorium can sell at retail for a very high price relative to the general run of DVDs. However, prices are known to drop near the end of the issue. In the past, a moratorium created urgency for people interested in a film to obtain it before it became unavailable. A side effect of the moratorium process was that videos and DVDs of films, once they are placed on moratorium, would become collector's items. Additional unintended side-effects to the practice of moratorium had made films a prime target for internet piracy and bootleg sales.

== See also ==
- Blackout (broadcasting)
