= Scamp (comics) =

Disney comics character

Publication information
- Publisher: Dell Comics, Gold Key Comics / Whitman Comics
- Genre: Humor; Funny animals
- Publication date: 1958–1961; 1967–1978
- No. of issues: 61, including 4 issues of Four Color

Creative team
- Written by: Del Connell
- Artist: Al Hubbard

Scamp is a canine Disney comics character, the son of Lady and Tramp, all of whom appear in the 1955 animated film Lady and the Tramp. In the final scene of the film, the dogs have a litter of puppies, including three girl pups who look like Lady, and a mischievous, restless boy pup who resembles Tramp. The puppies are unnamed in the film and only appear in one scene, but the little boy puppy made an impression, and King Features Syndicate launched a comic strip a few months after the film's release.

Scamp's comic strip ran for more than 30 years, from October 31, 1955 to June 25, 1988. He first appeared in a comic book in Dell Comics' Four Color #703 (May 1956); this turned into a regular comic book series which reached issue #16 (Dec 1960). A second series was launched by Gold Key Comics in 1967; this ran for 45 issues, ending in January 1979. In 2001, Scamp was animated for the first time since his brief appearance in Lady and the Tramp, being the protagonist in a direct-to-video film by Walt Disney Television Animation, Lady and the Tramp II: Scamp's Adventure.

== Comic strip ==
The first daily strip featuring Scamp as the main character was published on October 31, 1955, four months after the movie opened. A Sunday strip was added a few months later, on January 15, 1956. The final Scamp comic strip was published June 25, 1988.

For the first eight months, Scamp had continuity and was written by Ward Greene, the King Features Syndicate editor whose 1945 short story "Happy Dan, the Cynical Dog" contributed to the development of the storyline for Lady and the Tramp. Advance publicity for the strip noted Greene's participation and the strip carried the byline "By Ward Greene". Disney historian Jim Fanning notes Scamp likely is "the only strip written by the original author of the work from which it sprang". Greene and artist Dick Moores wrote the strip with a continuing storyline, but less than a year later, new creative personnel were doing it in a gag-a-day format.

In the strip, Scamp lives in the backyard of Jim Dear and Darling's house with his mother Lady, father Tramp, and three siblings: two sisters named Fluffy and Ruffy, and a brother, Scooter (however, in Lady and the Tramp II: Scamp's Adventure, he has three sisters: Annette, Collette and Danielle. In the Gold Key/Dell comic books, he has three sisters as well; however they are not named.). The family is often visited by their canine friends, Jock the Scottish Terrier, Trusty the bloodhound, Boris, Bull, Pedro the Chihuahua, and Peg. In the early sequences, humans appeared in the strip, but when the gag-a-day format began, the only human to appear regularly was Albert, a little boy who was considered Scamp's master. Other animals who appear in the strip include Squeeky the mouse, Tiny the dachshund, Cheeps the bluejay, Shakey the chipmunk, Quacky the duck and Bloopy the bulldog.

=== Early storylines ===
The first story ran for four weeks, from October to November 1955. Scamp is a bold, playful puppy who does not like to do as he is told. He decides to dig a hole under the backyard fence and seek adventure. He rolls in grass, chases birds, steals a bone from another dog, and generally enjoys himself. As night falls, he realizes that he does not know how to return home. Worried, Lady tells Tramp to go and find their son. Tramp meets with the bloodhound Trusty, but they cannot find Scamp until they hear the sound of a scuffle, which is a huge angry dog, fighting with Scamp. Tramp bites the large dog and chases him away, and Scamp wags his tail, claiming, "I guess I fixed his wagon, didn't I?" Exhausted, Scamp falls asleep, and Tramp and Trusty carry him home.

In the next four-week story (November to December 1955), Tramp goes out for a walk, promising to "bring home the bacon" for his family. He eats some scraps and talks with old friends, until it is late and he realizes the family is waiting for him. He finds an unfriendly dog with a big bone, and tricks the mutt into dropping it. The next day, the puppies all happily chew on the bone.

This was followed by a one-week story about Scamp meeting an owl, and then another four-week story (December 1955 to January 1956) in which Scamp's siblings are named. One sister, who is ladylike, is named Fluffy, and Tramp calls the tomboy sister Ruffy. That leaves the baby brother without a name. The family is playing in the snow, and the baby slides down the hill toward a frozen lake with a huge hole in the ice. Scamp and Ruffy fall into the water and are rescued by Tramp, but the baby boy says that he did not fall in the water, he just "scooted" over it. Tramp and Lady decide to call him Scooter.

The next story ran for three months, from mid-January to mid-April 1956. Scamp meets a show dog, Annie, and dreams of being in a dog show himself. He follows Annie to a show and tries to crash the contest, but the humans call him a mutt and throw him out. Si and Am, the Siamese cat twins, make fun of Scamp, but he barks and chases them into the dog show tent, starting a commotion and wrecking the show. Scamp mopes, and Tramp decides that his son needs a boy as a playmate. After scoping out a couple prospects, Scamp approaches a lonely boy, who brings him to a neighborhood mutt show. Scamp does not win any ribbons in the first competition, but he whistles in the talent contest and wins the grand prize. The boy brings Scamp home and wants to keep him, but Scamp misses his family and whines until they let him go back to his family. The boy arranges to see Scamp once a week.

In the final one-month story (April to May 1956), bloodhound Trusty confides to Scamp that he has lost his sense of smell, and Scamp promises to be his "smelling-nose dog". The pair get a chance to try out the new arrangement when a young boy becomes lost, and they track him by smelling his lollipop. The boy is found by police, so the dogs' adventure dwindles, and the last few strips are just gags about Trusty not being able to smell anymore.

In mid-May, when Ward Greene and Dick Moores left the strip, it became a gag-a-day strip.

=== Creators ===
Starting in May 1956, Bill Berg took over as the writer, continuing until March 1984. During most of this period, Manuel Gonzales inked the strip, from May 1956 to March 1981. Various artists did the pencil art for Gonzales' inks: Bob Grant (May 1956 – March 1961), Chuck Fuson (March 1961 – May 1965), Bob Grant again (May 1965 – April 1968), Glenn Schmitz (April 1968 – March 1969), Mike Arens (March 1969 – August 1976), Richard Moore (August 1976 – June 1978) and Roger Armstrong (June 1978 – March 1981). Bill Wright provided inks for Roger Armstrong's pencils from March 1981 to February 1984. Tom Yakutis took over as the final writer on the strip with Roger Armstrong on pencils, from March 1984 to June 1988. During this time, inks were done by Bill Langley (February–July 1984), Larry Mayer (July 1984 – May 1988) and Charles Mendendorp (May–June 1988).

=== Reprints ===
Scamp has been reprinted in many newspapers and Disney comics magazines around the world. It was translated into Turkish (as Boncuk) for the daily Milliyet, into Finnish (as Pepi) for Ilta-Sanomat, and into Swedish (as Ludde) for Dagens Nyheter. It was reprinted in Belgium's Mickey Magazine, Brazil's O Pato Donald and the UK's Mickey Mouse Weekly. In the Netherlands, the strip was reprinted (as Rakker) in a 1987 omnibus comic.

== Comic book ==
The Scamp character first appeared in comic book form in Four Color #703 (May 1956), written by Del Connell, drawn by Al Hubbard and published by Dell Comics. After making three more appearances in Four Color, the Scamp comic was given its own ongoing quarterly title, starting its numbering with issue #5 (March–May 1958). The comic ran until issue #16 (December 1960/January 1961), with a 17th appearing later in the year as Four Color #1204 (August/October 1961). All of the stories were drawn by Al Hubbard, with several writers including Bob Gregory and Don R. Christensen.

During this period, Scamp also appeared every month in the anthology comic Walt Disney's Comics and Stories, starting with issue #204 (September 1957) through #254 (November 1961). These stories were written by Gregory, with art by Hubbard and Jack Bradbury.

In December 1967, Gold Key Comics revived the series, although it only published reprints of earlier stories through issue #21 (January 1975). With issue #22 (March 1975), the comic started printing new stories drawn by Mike Arens and Mike Royer. The title's last issue was #45 (January 1979).

Scamp also returned to Walt Disney's Comics and Stories in the late 1960s, appearing regularly from issue #332 (May 1968) to #370 (July 1971), and periodically from issue #377 (February 1972) to #437 (February 1977)..

In the Four Color (Dell) and Gold Key comic books, Scamp's siblings are three unnamed younger sisters, unlike in the newspaper strip.

=== Publication history ===
- Four Color #703, 777, 806, 833, 1204 (Dell, 1956–1961)
- Walt Disney's Comics & Stories #204–254, 275–279, 303, 305 (Dell, 1957–1966)
- Walt Disney's Donald Duck Beach Party #4 (Dell, 1957)
- Christmas in Disneyland (Dell, 1957)
- Walt Disney's Scamp #5–16 (Dell, 1958–1960)
- Walt Disney's Lady and the Tramp (Gold Key, 1963)
- Scamp #1–45 (Gold Key, 1967–1979)
- Walt Disney's Comics & Stories #332–370, periodically #377–437 (Gold Key, 1968–1977)
- Walt Disney Comics Digest #1–9, 11–14, 16–27, 29–30, 36–38, 53, 56–57 (Gold Key, 1968–1976)

In Europe in the 1970s, Egmont produced their own comics with Scamp. In these, Scooter was merely a nameless sister, similar to the Gold Key and Dell comic books.

== In other media ==
Scamp is the protagonist in the film Lady and the Tramp II: Scamp's Adventure, with his siblings (three sisters) appearing in small roles. The film is about Scamp running away from home and joining a gang of stray dogs, where he ends up falling in love with one of the members, Angel.
