= 2025 in comics =

Notable events of 2025 in comics.

== Events ==
=== January ===
- January 1:
  - The earliest episodes of Thimble Theatre (Popeye) enter public domain, but the series' trademarks remain with King Features.
  - The earliest versions of Hergé's comic characters Tintin and Snowy enter public domain, but only in the United States.
  - All characters created by Belgian comic artist Marc Sleen officially enter public domain, as decided by the Marc Sleen Foundation.
- January 3: U.S. comic artist and editorial cartoonist Ann Telnaes resigns as cartoonist for The Washington Post, after one of her cartoons was rejected for publication, because her point of view was not supported by the editors. The cartoon depicted various real-life billionaires offering cash to a huge statue of Donald Trump.
- January 8: Belgian comic artist Merho, who decided to terminate his signature series De Kiekeboes in 2023 and replace it with a spin-off series drawn in a different style, announces that the original series will resume publication with a new album.
- January 15: U.S. editorial cartoonist and comic artist Darrin Bell is arrested under suspicion of having uploaded and possessed child pornography, including of real children and AI-generated children. He is the first person to be charged under a California law criminalizing AI-generated child sexual abuse material.
- January 25: Dutch comics artist Michiel van de Pol wins the Stripschapprijs.
- January 29: U.S. comic artist John Romita Jr. receives a Lifetime Achievement Award at the Angoulême International Comics Festival.

=== February ===
- February 10: The comics information website Stripspeciaalzaak, hosted by David Steenhuyse, wins the annual P. Hans Frankfurther Prize.

=== March ===
- Willy Linthout and Ann Smet release the first public domain The Adventures of Nero story in album format, titled De Babbelkousen.

=== April ===
- April 14: A year and a half after Merho's De Kiekeboes was discontinued in the newspaper Het Laatste Nieuws, the series returns to the paper with an exclusive new story.
- April 15: Dan Nadel releases the first biography about Robert Crumb, Crumb: A Cartoonist's Life, written in full participation with the artist himself.
- April 23: A day after Pope Francis passes away, Patrick J. Marrin concludes his celebrity comic Francis, which he had been drawing since the first year of Francis' papacy in 2013. A spin-off, The Brother Leo Chronicles, debuting May 12, centers on the newly elected pope Leo XIV.
- April 25: Dutch comic artist Robert van der Kroft is knighted in the Order of Orange-Nassau.

=== May ===
- May 6:
  - Ann Telnaes wins the Pulitzer Prize for Editorial Cartooning for the exact cartoon that was censored by The Washington Post earlier that year, which had motivated her to resign from the paper.
  - Tessa Hulls becomes the second comic artist to receive a Pulitzer Prize for a graphic novel, in her case, the Pulitzer Prize for Memoir or Autobiography for Feeding Ghosts: A Graphic Memoir.
- May 19: It is revealed that TV channel PBS cut a scene from the documentary Art Spiegelman: Disaster Is My Muse in which Art Spiegelman comments on an anti-Donald Trump comic he drew. The news causes instant controversy, also among the documentary makers.

=== July ===
- July 3: U.S. political cartoonist Kevin Kallaugher, A.K.A. Kal, is fired by The Baltimore Sun, according to him for his political views critical of U.S. President Donald Trump.

=== August ===
- August 27: A new album of the series Amoras is announced, in which Suske and Wiske from the series Suske en Wiske share a kiss. The announcement receives a lot of media attention and online debate.

=== September ===
- September 2: After being discontinued for 20 years, Marc Legendre's comic Biebel is relaunched as a weekly comic in the newspaper De Morgen.
- September 11: Comic writer Gretchen Felker-Martin's comic series Red Hood is cancelled by DC Comics after she made a comment on social media poking fun at the murder of political commentator Charlie Kirk.
- September 30: Belgian comic artist Merho releases his first novel, Looklucht.

=== October ===
- October 2: A crossover comic book, De Vorsten van Onderland, is released, bringing the rival series Suske en Wiske and Jommeke together, to celebrate respectively the 80th anniversary of the former and the 70th anniversary of the latter series.
- October 3: In Groenlo, The Netherlands, a theme park is opened, Bommelwereld, based on the classic comic Tom Poes.
- October 23: A new Astérix story, Asterix in Lusitania, is released on this date.

=== November ===
- November 5: Robert Crumb's R. Crumb's Tales of Paranoia, his first published work in 16 years, released by Fantagraphics.
- November 20: A first-print copy of the very first Superman comic book is auctioned for the record-breaking $9.12m dollars. It was found in the attic of the recently passed away mother of two brothers in California.
- November 21: A woman who was sedated and raped by a colleague during the 2024 Angoulême Comics Festival in France, goes public with her story. Despite registering a complaint at the organisation 9e Art+, she was not believed and fired by them. The sex scandal leads to petitions to boycot the festival. On 1 December it is announced that the entire festival will be cancelled.

=== December ===
- December 4: Belgian comic artists Ever Meulen and François Schuiten receive honorary doctorats from the Free University of Brussels.
- December 23: It is announced that the statues of Belgian comic characters at the Zeedijk in Middelkerke, Belgium, will be removed at the initiative of mayor Jean-Marie Dedecker.

=== Specific date unknown ===
- Joris Vermassen releases his graphic novel Soldaat-Hovenier, based on his grandfather's World War I diaries.

== Deaths ==
=== January ===
- January 1: Kaak, Indian cartoonist, dies at age 84.
- January 10:
  - Marc Michetz, A.K.A. Marc de Groide, Belgian comics artist (Kogaratsu, Tako), dies at age 73.
  - Michel Schetter, Belgian comics writer (Yérushalaïm), artist (Cargo, Berlin, Yin and Yang) and colorist (Tibet), dies at age 76.
- January 15:
  - Patricia Lyfoung, French comic artist (The Mythics, The Scarlet Rose), dies at age 47.
  - Turtel Onli, American art teacher, publisher and comic artist (NOG, Malcolm-10), dies at age 72.
- January 16: David Lynch, American director, comics writer and artist (The Angriest Dog in the World), dies at age 78.
- January 17: Jules Feiffer, American comic artist (Tantrum, Kill My Mother) and essayist (The Great Comic Book Heroes), dies at age 95.
- January 20: Alain Sikorski, Belgian comic artist (Tif et Tondu, Garage Isidore), dies at age 65.
- January 21: Doug Sneyd, Canadian comics artist (Scoops, Playboy), dies at age 93.
- January 23:
  - Luc Cauwenberghs, Belgian sculptor (sculpted the statue of Nero in Hoeilaart, Gaston Lagaffe (Gomer Goof) in Charleroi and of Urbanus in Middelkerke and the Plastieken Walvis sculpture (based on the Jommeke story of the same name) in Wilrijk), dies at age 72.
  - Leen van Hulst, Belgian comics artist (Melk en Sneeuw), dies at age 42.
- January 24:
  - Gianfranco Manfredi, Italian comic artist (Magic Wind, Gordon Link, Shanghai Devil, Dylan Dog), dies at age 76.
  - Marcin Wicha, Polish cartoonist, dies at age 52.
- January 29: Joe Hale, American animator and comic artist (Disney comics), dies at age 99.
- January 30: Ada Milani, A.K.A. Ada Uderzo, wife of French comics artist Albert Uderzo (inspiration for the character Falbala (Panacea in English translation) in the Astérix story Asterix the Legionary), dies at age 89.

=== February ===
- February 2: Mort Künstler, American painter, poster illustrator and comic artist (Classics Illustrated, the Jaws poster parody on the cover of Mad), dies at age 97.
- February 4: Ed Seeman, American cartoonist, dies at age 93.
- February 7: Chris Moore, British illustrator and comic artist (Heavy Metal, Graphic Classics), dies at age 58.
- February 8: Rob van Eijck, Dutch comics journalist (wrote for Stripschrift), writer (books about Marten Toonder, Hans G. Kresse, Martin Lodewijk), artist (De Opstand de Bataven), letterer, translator and namegiver for the Rob van Eijck Comics Award, dies at age 76.
- February 9: KC Carlson, American comic book editor and writer (Legion of Super-Heroes, Superboy, Batman), dies at age 68.
- February 11: Jerry Eisenberg, American animator and comic artist (Hanna-Barbera comics, Thundarr the Barbarian), dies at age 87.
- February 14: Colin Whittock, British comic artist (Champ, Lazy Bones, Catnap, Mizz Marble, Coronation Street Kids, Ivy the Terrible), dies at age 84.
- February 15:
  - Chantal De Spiegeleer, Belgian comic artist (Adler, Blake and Mortimer), dies at age 67.
  - Ivan Steiger, Czechoslovak-born German cartoonist, dies at age 86.
- February 16: Jim Silke, American comic book artist (Rascals in Paradise, Vampirella, Sin City, The Rocketeer, The Magdalena), dies at age 93.
- February 24: Leen Vandersteen, Belgian businesswoman (daughter of Willy Vandersteen, team leader of Studio Vandersteen and inspiration for his character Wiske), dies at age 88.
- February 25: Roberto Orci, Mexican-born American screenwriter and comic book writer (Star Trek, Transformers), dies at age 51.

=== March ===
- March 3: Walter Fahrer, Argentine comic book writer (Pilote, Harry Chase), dies at age 85.
- March 4: Al Wiesner, American comics writer and artist (Shaloman), dies at age 94.
- March 13: Pierluigi Sangalli, Italian comic book artist (Geppo, Nonna Abelarda, Provolino, Popeye), dies at age 83.
- March 15: The Mad Peck, American cartoonist, dies at age 83.
- March 22: Angelo Todaro, Italian comic book artist (Mandrake the Magician, Turok, The Phantom, Star Trek), dies at age 79.
- March 27: Hy Eisman, American comics writer and artist (Little Lulu, Little Iodine, Popeye and The Katzenjammer Kids), dies at age 98.
- March 31: Nancy Kilpatrick, Canadian writer and comic book writer (Vamperotica, Famous Monsters Presents Tales from the Acker-Mansion), dies at age 78.

=== April ===
- April 4: Tod Smith, American comic book artist (Darkhawk, Omega Men, Punisher), dies at age 72.
- April 14: Danny Verbiest, Belgian puppeteer, screenwriter and comic writer (wrote the script for Marc Daniëls' comic about Brussels painter and art dealer Geert van Bruaene), dies at age 79.
- April 17: Robert B. Stull, American comic book artist (Tellos, X-Force, Iron Man), dies at age 58.
- April 18: Mark Zingarelli, American comic artist (Weirdo, American Splendor), dies at age 72.
- April 19: George Barr, American artist and comic book artist (Conan the Barbarian), dies at age 88.
- April 22: Henk Groeneveld, Dutch comic artist (Opa), dies at age 79.
- April 24: Jack Katz, American comic book artist (Sub-Mariner, Strange Tales), dies at age 97.
- April 30: Patrice Ricord, French comic artist (Grandes Gueules), dies at age 77.

=== May ===
- May 1:
  - Jackson Guice, American comic artist (Superman, Doctor Strange, Captain America, co-creator of Apocalypse), dies at age 63.
  - Lidwine, French comic artist (Le Dernier Loup d'Oz), dies at age 64.
  - Bob Brockie, New Zealand cartoonist, dies at age 93.
- May 2: Jim Smith, American animator and comic artist (Spümcø Comics), dies at age 70.
- May 8: Enea Riboldi, Italian comics artist (Dylan Dog), dies at age 70.
- May 16: Gerard Soeteman, Dutch screenwriter and comics writer (Steven Severijn, Floris), dies at age 88.
- May 17: François Marcela-Froideval, French comic book writer (Black Moon Chronicles), dies at age 66.
- May 20: Barry Fantoni, British comics writer and artist (Private Eye), dies at age 85.
- May 24: Peter David, American comic book writer (The Incredible Hulk, Aquaman, Young Justice, Spider-Man 2099), dies at age 68.

=== June ===
- June 30: Jim Shooter, American comic book writer (Marvel Comics, Secret Wars, Legion of Super Heroes, Valiant Comics), dies at age 73.

=== July ===
- July 8:
  - Steve Benson, American cartoonist, dies at age 71.
  - Günther Mayrhofer, Austrian comics artist (Gallenstein), dies at age 75.
- July 20: Nancy Burton, A.K.A. Panzika, A.K.A. Hurricane Nancy, American comic artist (Gentle's Tripout, It Ain't Me, Babe), dies at age 84.
- July 26:
  - Tom Lehrer, American singer and pianist (wrote two satirical articles for Mad Magazine), dies at age 97.
  - Ervin Rustemagić, Bosnian comics publisher (Strip Art Features), dies at age 73.
- July 27:
  - Shohei Harumoto, Japanese manga artist (Kirin), dies at an unknown age.
  - Eric Heath, New Zealand cartoonist, dies at age 101.
  - Norman Clifford, Australian comic artist (Sky Demons, The Olympixies, Adventures in Tiny Land), dies at age 98.
- July 31: Léandre Bergeron, Canadian historian and comics writer (Histoire du Québec), dies at age 91.
- Specific date in July unknown: Joop Mommers, Dutch comic artist (Kanis W. Lupus, advertising comics for General Electric), dies at age 75.

=== August ===
- August 1:
  - Fleg, Canadian cartoonist, dies at age 61–62.
  - Daniel Divinsky, Argentine publisher (Ediciones de la Flor), dies at age 83.
- August 5: Angelo Maria Ricci, Italian comics artist (Diabolik, Martin Mystère, Tiramolla), dies at age 79.
- August 9: Eustaquio Segrelles, Spanish comic artist (Los Imbatidos, Joyas Literarias Juveniles, Commando: For Action and Adventure), dies at age 89.
- August 11: Marie-Mad, French comic book author (Lumière dans la tour, Petit frère et petite sœur, Titounet et Titounette), dies at age 102.
- August 23: Dave Taylor, British comic book artist (Tongue*Lash, Batman, Judge Dredd, Gene Dogs), dies at age 61.
- August 24:
  - Jaguar, Brazilian comics writer and artist (Chopiniks), dies at age 93.
  - Mort Todd, American animator, comics writer and artist (The Uggly Family, Tales from the Crypt comics) and editor (Cracked, Monsters Attack!), dies at age 63.
- August 28: Elijah Brubaker, American comics writer and artist (Reich), dies at age 50.
- August 30: Franja Straka, Serbian comic artist (Ajk), dies at age 72.

=== September ===
- September 8: Philippe Goddin, Belgian comics critic (wrote various biographical books about Hergé, The Adventures of Tintin and Paul Cuvelier) and secretary-general of the Hergé Foundation, dies at age 81.
- September 15:
  - Anthony D'Adamo, A.K.A. Tony D'Adamo, American illustrator and comic artist (Laws Long Ago, drew comics for Fiction House), dies at age 94.
  - Ron Friedman, American screenwriter and comic book writer (Iron Man, Zorro), dies at age 93.
- September 21: Serdu, Belgian cartoonist, dies at age 85.
- September 23: Ashleigh Brilliant, American cartoonist, dies at age 91.
- September 24: Yves Leclercq, Belgian comics writer (comics for Georges Van Linthout, Jérôme Deleers, Xavier Lemmens), dies at age 65.
- September 26: Bernard Linssen, Belgian comic artist (Chroniques Gorilles), dies at age 69.
- September 30: Renato Casaro, Italian film poster artist and comic book cover artist (Marvel Comics Super Special, Conan the Barbarian), dies at age 89.

=== October ===
- October 1: Eric De Rop, Belgian comics writer, artist and editorial cartoonist (Schanulleke, Bloemlezing, Ribbedebie, Kat en Hond, Kapoen, assisted on Suske en Wiske and Jommeke), dies at age 71.
- October 11: Tony Fitzpatrick, American artist and comic book artist (Hard Looks), dies at age 66.
- October 13: Drew Struzan, American film poster artist and comic book cover artist (Action Comics, Star Wars, Star Trek), dies at age 78.
- October 27: J. D. King, American musician, artist and comic book artist (Beastniks, Heavy Metal, Drawn and Quarterly), dies at age 74.

=== November ===
- November 4: Giorgio Forattini, Italian cartoonist, dies at age 94.
- November 17: Oldřich Jelínek, Czech cartoonist, dies at age 95.
- November 18: Louis Small Jr., American comic book artist (worked on Vampirella, Codename Knockout), dies at age 61.
- November 29: Frank Pé, Belgian comic book artist (Brouissaille, Zoo), dies at age 69.

=== December ===
- December 14: Harry Balm, Dutch illustrator, painter and comic artist (Disney comics, the duck-themed paintings in the Galerij der Groten column in the Dutch Disney weekly Donald Duck), dies at age 85.
- December 15: John Antrobus, British playwright, screenwriter and comic book writer (Uncle Scrooge, Donald Duck), dies at age 92.
- December 16: Édika, Egyptian-born French comic artist (Clarke Gaybeul, Epix, Snarf), dies at age 84.
- December 23: Jean-Claude Block, Belgian set designer and comics artist (part of the Ercola group), dies at age 84.
- December 26: Pierre Bordage, French author and comic book writer (Launfest, Les Fables de l'Humpur), dies at age 70.
- December 27: Garrick Tremain, New Zealand cartoonist, dies at age 84.

== Conventions ==
- March 15-16: MoCCA Festival (Metropolitan Pavilion, New York City)
- April 12–13: STAPLE! (Mabee Ballroom, St. Edward's University)
- April 26-27: Small Press and Alternative Comics Expo [SPACE] (Ohio Expo Center, Rhodes Center, Columbus, Ohio)
- July 24–27: San Diego Comic-Con (San Diego Convention Center, San Diego, California)
- September 13–14: Small Press Expo [SPX] (Bethesda North Marriott Hotel & Conference Center, North Bethesda, Maryland)
- September 18-21: Cartoon Crossroads Columbus (Columbus, Ohio)
- October 9-12: New York Comic Con (Javits Center, New York City)
- October 17–19: Baltimore Comic-Con (Baltimore Convention Center, Baltimore, Maryland)
- December 6–7: Massachusetts Independent Comics Expo [MICE] (Fuller Building, Boston University, Brookline, Massachusetts)
