= Alberico Motta =

Italian cartoonist and illustrator (1937–2019)

- Born: 6 October 1937; Milan, Italy
- Died: 23 May 2019 (aged 81); Certosa di Pavia, Italy
- Occupation: Cartoonist

Alberico Motta (6 October 1937 - 23 May 2019) was an Italian cartoonist and illustrator.

== Life and career ==
Born in Milan, Motta started his career at just 14 years old, collaborating with some children magazines published by Edizioni Alpe. He made his debut as a cartoonist on the magazine Chicchirichì, realizing stories of the title character as well as series created by himself.

Starting from 1957 Motta started collaborating, both as an artist and more often as a writer, with the major characters of Edizioni Alpe, notably Tiramolla, Cucciolo, Geppo, Nonna Abelarda, Provolino and the Italian-produced comic versions of Popeye ("Braccio di Ferro"), Felix and Tom and Jerry. In 1980 he created the first Italian manga-inspired comic series, Big Robot. In the 1980s he wrote stories for the Walt Disney magazine Topolino and collaborated with the publishing house Epierre. He retired from comics in 1992, to work as an art director in an advertising agency.
