= Special Stage =

Special stage may refer to:

- Special stage (rallying)
- SS (manga), known alternatively as Special Stage
- Bonus stage
