= Riboldi =

Riboldi is a surname. Notable people with the surname include:

- Agostino Gaetano Riboldi (1839–1902), Italian Roman Catholic cardinal
- Antonio Riboldi (1923–2017), Italian Roman Catholic bishop
- Enea Riboldi (1954–2025), Italian cartoonist and illustrator
- Penelope Riboldi (born 1986), Italian footballer

== Fictional characters ==
- Elvis Riboldi, the main protagonist in the Spanish graphic novel series and the French-Spanish animated children's television series I, Elvis Riboldi
