= Sangalli =

Sangalli is an Italian surname. Notable people with the surname include:

- François Sangalli, French rugby player
- Luca Sangalli, Spanish footballer
- Marco Sangalli, Spanish footballer
- Pierluigi Sangalli, Italian comics artist
- Rita Sangalli, Italian ballet dancer
