= Fahrer =

Fahrer is a surname. In German, the meaning of Fahrer is "(male) driver". Notable people with the surname include:

- Pete Fahrer (1890–1967), American baseball player
- Walter Fahrer (1939–2025), Argentine comic book author and illustrator

== See also ==
- Fahrerbunker, a former air raid shelter for Nazi vehicles in Berlin
