= Quino bibliography =

This is a list of works of Quino, the Argentine cartoonist. The list currently contains 13 Mafalda comic books and 19 humor books.

== Mafalda ==
Quino published Mafalda strips from September 1964 to July 1973. Below is a selection of the books that have been released over the years.

- Mafalda 1 (1970)
- Mafalda 2 (1970)
- Mafalda 3 (1970)
- Mafalda 4 (1970)
- Mafalda 5 (1970)
- Mafalda 6 (1970)
- Mafalda 7 (1971)
- Mafalda 8 (1972)
- Mafalda 9 (1973)
- Mafalda 10 (1974)
- Mafalda inédita (Mafalda Unpublished, 1988)
- 10 años con Mafalda (10 years with Mafalda, 1991)
- Toda Mafalda (All Mafalda, 1993)

== Humor books ==
Below a selection of the humour books published.

- Mundo Quino (Quino World, 1963)
- ¡A mí no me grite! (Don't You Yell at Me!, 1972)
- Yo que usted... (If I Were You..., 1973)
- Bien gracias, ¿y usted? (Well Thank You, and You?, 1976)
- Hombres de bolsillo (Pocket Men, 1977)
- A la buena mesa (To Fine Dining, 1980)
- Ni arte ni parte (Neither Art nor Part, 1981)
- Déjenme inventar (Let Me Invent, 1983)
- Quinoterapia (Quinotherapy, 1985)
- Gente en su sitio (People in their Place, 1986)
- Sí, cariño (Yes, Dear, 1987)
- Potentes, prepotentes e impotentes (Powerful, Arrogant and Impotent, 1989)
- Humano se nace (As a Human One is Born, 1991)
- ¡Yo no fui! (I Didn't Do It!, 1994)
- ¡Qué mala es la gente! (How Bad People Are!, 1996)
- ¡Cuánta bondad! (How Much Goodness!, 1999)
- Esto no es todo (This is not All, 2002)
- ¡Qué presente impresentable! (What an Unpresentable Present!, 2005)
- La aventura de comer (The Adventure of Eating, 2007)
