= Pierluigi Sangalli =

Italian comic artist (1938–2025)

- Born: 5 November 1938; Monza, Italy
- Died: 13 March 2025 (aged 86); Villasanta, Italy
- Occupation: Comic artist

Pierluigi Sangalli (5 November 1938 – 13 March 2025) was an Italian comic artist, comic writer and illustrator.

== Life and career ==
Born in Monza, while studying accounting Sangalli had as a classmate Alberico Motta, of whom he became a close friend and who later introduced him to the comics publisher Renato Bianconi. He made his professional debut in 1958, collaborating with the comics magazine Soldino. He began his career as an inker, and then started writing stories for series such as Trottolino and Volpetto. In the same period, he debuted as comic artist with the Italian version of Felix the Cat.

Sangalli was most active as a cartoonist for Braccio di Ferro, the Italian version of Popeye, among other things drawing all the covers of the regular series from 1963 until its closure. His version got the praise of Hy Eisman. Other characters he worked in include Geppo, Nonna Abelarda, Provolino and the comic version of Topo Gigio. Characters he created include Mago Merlotto, Saruzzo, Dormy West and Fantasma Eugenio.

Sangalli died in Villasanta on 13 March 2025, at the age of 86.
