= Daniel Divinsky =

Argentinian lawyer and publisher (1942–2025)

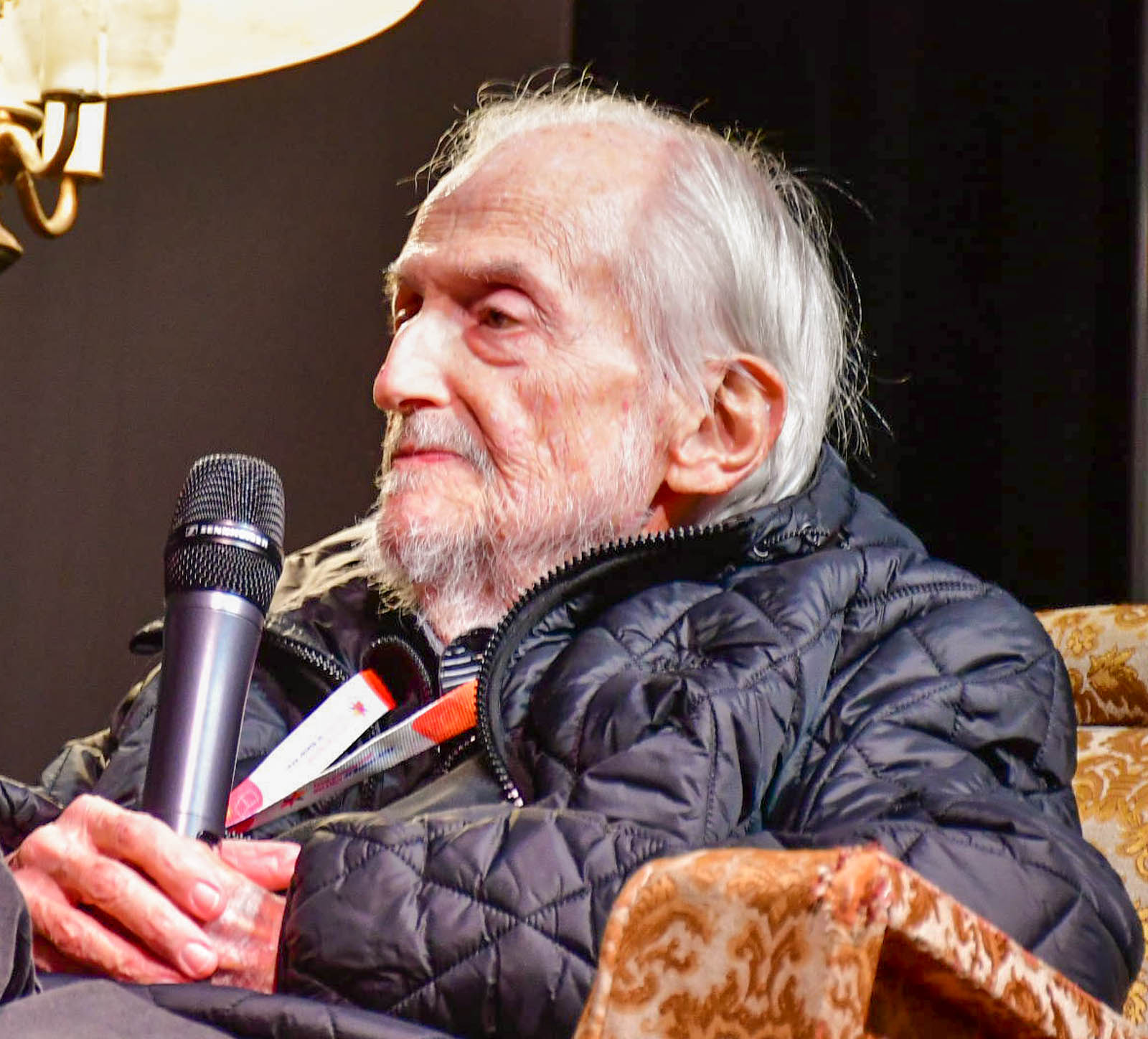
Danuel Divinsky in 2024

Daniel Jorge Divinsky (April 1, 1942 – August 1, 2025) was an Argentine lawyer and publisher. He was a founding partner of Ediciones de la Flor.

== Life and career ==
Divinsky was born in Buenos Aires on March 3, 1942. At the age of 20 he graduated as a lawyer from the University of Buenos Aires, with honors. In 1967 Divinsky founded Ediciones de la Flor. The properties the publishing house handled included, after 1970, book-format reprints of the comic strip Mafalda.

During the 1976–1983 military dictatorship, Divinsky, his wife and their young son Emilio had to go into exile in Venezuela for six years, after spending four months in detention, and having been released under pressure from international publishers' associations. In 1983 he returned to Argentina, and continued to serve as director of De la Flor together with Kuki Miller (during exile it had been left in charge of his mother-in-law). The first book he published on his return was Los Pichiciegos, by Fogwill.

Divinsky died in Buenos Aires on August 1, 2025, at the age of 83.
