= The Really Heavy Greatcoat =

- Author(s): John Freeman and Nick Miller
- Website: http://www.downthetubes.net
- Current status/schedule: Updates monthly
- Launch date: 1987 in print; 2001 online
- Genre: Story/Humour

The Really Heavy Greatcoat is a British cartoon strip by John Freeman and Nick Miller, later published as a webcomic.

== History ==
The Really Heavy Greatcoat debuted in the Lancaster, Lancashire listings magazine On the Beat in February 1987, and its successor, Off the Beat. It is now published primarily online as a web comic on the web comics platform Tapastic.

The strip has previously been by the community web site virtual-lancaster.net and published for mobile by ROK Comics and in the international comics magazine Comics International, one of the most respected journals in the comics industry, and has been selected for publication in various titles, including The Norm published by syndicated US cartoonist Michael Jantze and Paper Tiger, an independent UK comics anthology.

The cartoon is written by former Marvel UK and Titan Magazines editor John Freeman and drawn by Nick Miller, a cartoonist whose work has appeared in various UK and US magazines for many years including US publisher Eureka Productions. The strip, often poking fun at newsworthy events as well as satirising comics counterculture, centres on a greatcoat brought to life sometime in the 1960s after being exposed to mind-enhancing drugs stuffed in its pockets.

The strip has a dedicated following in Lancaster and on the internet, with a detailed listing on The Comics Database, and has spawned several spin-offs, including The Underversity drawn by Paul J. Palmer.

In 2014, John Freeman began to publish an archive of the strip on the web comic platform Tapastic. New strips are added intermittently. In 2015, Nick Miller began the weekly The RHG on the same service, a satirical strip which occasionally features the Greatcoat and its modern-day owner, layabout Kevin.
