= Ediciones de la Flor =

Argentine publishing company

Ediciones de la Flor was an Argentine publisher, founded in 1966 by Daniel Divinsky and Ana Maria Kuki Miler. It is one of the few still independent publishers of that country. It was known for publishing works of comic book authors, such as Roberto Fontanarrosa, Quino, Caloi and Liniers, in addition to publishing literary authors such as Rodolfo Walsh, Silvina Ocampo and Umberto Eco.

== History ==
The publisher began when the lawyer Divinsky and his legal partner Tito Finkelberg joined with the editor Jorge Álvarez to open a bookshop. Not having the necessary capital for the company, Álvarez suggested to use the money (300 dollars) to instead buy book publishing rights.

In 1967, de la Flor published its first book, the anthology Buenos Aires, de la fundación a la angustia (Buenos Aires from the foundation to the anxiety), including short stories by Julio Cortázar, Rodolfo Walsh and David Viñas. In 1970, Kuki joined the publishing house. That year, de la Flor published the first book of Quino's Mafalda.

Between 1977 and 1983, during the Argentine military dictatorship, Divinsky and Kuki went into exile in Venezuela, for having published Cinco Dedos (Five fingers), a children's book considered "subversive" by the government.

== Closing ==
In April 2026, at the 50th Buenos Aires International Book Fair, the publishing house announced its closing; in a statement the editors said: "The book world is not the same, and we are not the same either".
