= Giovan Battista Carpi =

Italian comics artist and illustrator

Giovan Battista Capri
- Born: 16 November 1927 Genoa, Kingdom of Italy
- Died: 8 March 1999 (aged 71) Genoa, Italy
- Area: Cartoonist
- Notable works: Paperinik

Giovan Battista Carpi (Italian: [dʒoˈvam batˈtista ˈkarpi]; 16 November 1927 – 8 March 1999) was a prolific Italian comics artist, illustrator, and teacher from Genoa.

Carpi worked mainly for Disney comics, mostly on books featuring Donald Duck and Scrooge McDuck, although he occasionally drew Mickey Mouse as well. He created Paperinik with Guido Martina. He also created other well-known comic characters for Edizioni Bianconi, such as Geppo, Nonna Abelarda, and Soldino.

== Early life ==
Carpi was born in Genoa and from a young age frequented the study of the artist Giacomo Picollo. He became a fumetti illustrator in 1945, when he published in the weekly Faville. He then began to publish a series "Sparagrosso, Cacciatore in Africa" for the children's magazine Lo Scolaro.

Two years later, he moved to Milan, where he got experience in animation at the Pagot studio. He continued to illustrate children's comics for studies like De Agostini, Corticelli, Tipys, and Messaggerie Musicali and began, in 1951, to draw humor comics.

== Disney parody artist ==
Carpi drew a very popular series of "Disney Parodies" for the Italian Disney comics magazine Topolino. As the German-language Duckipedia notes, "His love for historical fashions and costumes predisposed Carpi for Disney parodies of world literature, such as Paperino principe di Dunimarca, a parody of William Shakespeare's Hamlet, or Il mistero dei candelabri, a parody of Victor Hugo's Les Misérables."

Other popular parodies by Carpi include Guerra e Pace (1986, based upon War and peace by Leo Tolstoy), Paperino e il vento del Sud (1982, Gone with the Wind by Margaret Mitchell), Paperino e il giro del mondo in otto giorni (1962, Around the World in Eighty Days by Jules Verne), Paperin Caramba y Carmen Olè (1979, Carmen by Georges Bizet), Paolino Pocatesta e la bella Franceschina (1980, Inferno by Dante Alighieri), Topolino corriere dello Zar (1966, Michael Strogoff by Jules Verne), La metamorfosi di un papero (1991, The Metamorphosis by Franz Kafka).

== Death ==
Carpi died in Genoa on 8 March 1999.

== Awards ==
- Premio Yellow Kid, 1994 Salone Internazionale dei Comics, Rome
- Honorary laurea in science education, 1997, University of Bologna

== Selected works ==
- Zio Paperone e le guerre planetarie, Arnoldo Mondadori Editore, 1978
- Paperinik e il ritorno a Villa Rosa
- Zio Paperone e la corona di luce
- Paperino e il pianeta Esalion
- Zio Paperone e la fattoria orbitale
- Paperino e il mistero di Lucca, 1992

=== Reprints ===
In 2019, a volume in the Disney Masters book series from Fantagraphics Books titled Uncle Scrooge: King of the Golden River (ISBN 978-1-68396-170-3) was dedicated to Battista Carpi.
