= Primera Plana =

Argentine weekly magazine (1962–1973)

- Categories: Political magazine Cultural magazine News magazine
- Frequency: Weekly
- Founder: Jacobo Timerman
- Founded: 1962
- Final issue: 1973
- Country: Argentina
- Based in: Buenos Aires
- Language: Spanish
- ISSN: 0032-8375
- OCLC: 5628081

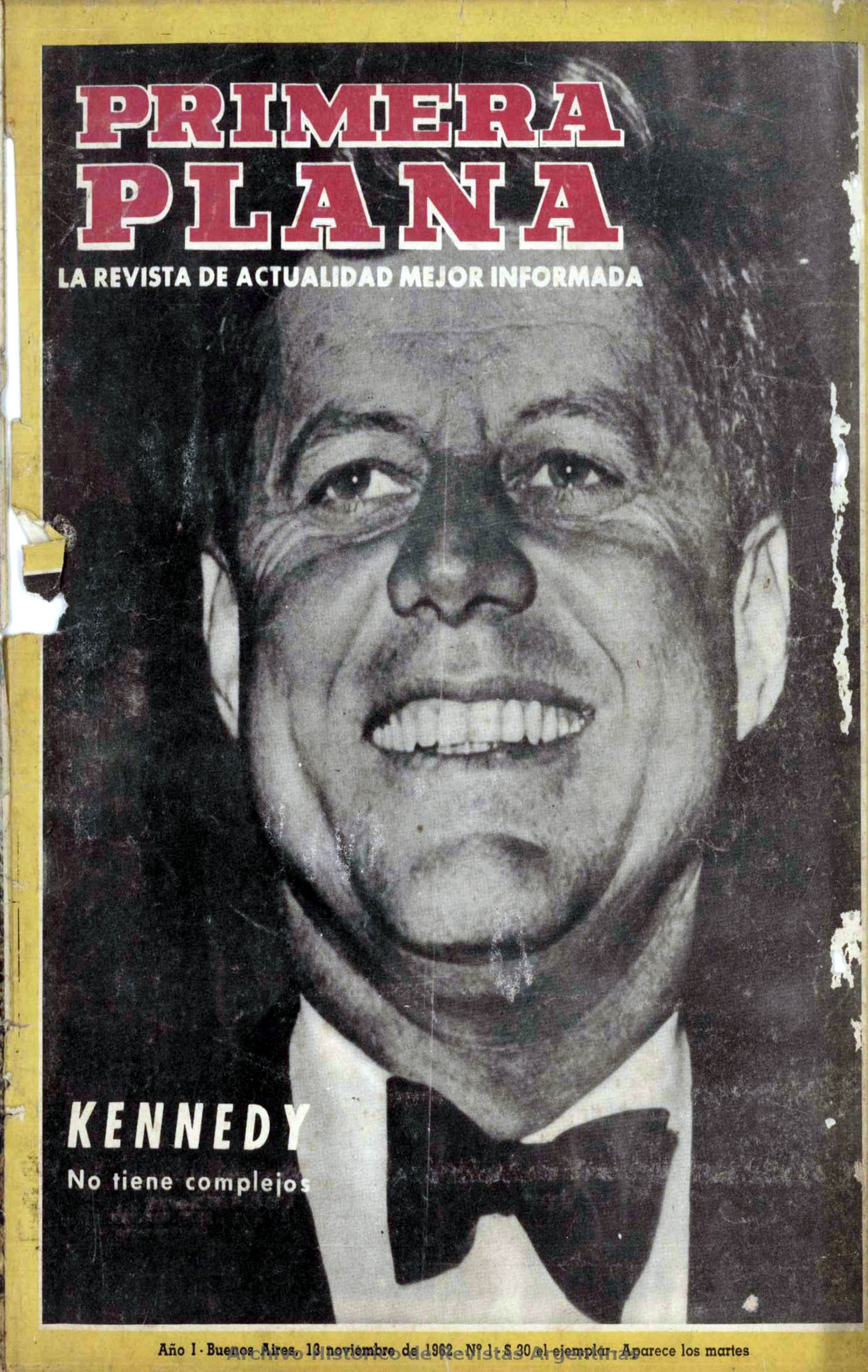
Cover of first edition, November 1962

Primera Plana was a weekly glossy political, cultural and current affairs magazine published in Buenos Aires, Argentina, between 1962 and 1973. The magazine was very influential in shaping the journalism tradition in the country.

== History and profile ==
Primera Plana was created in 1962 by Jacobo Timerman. The magazine modeled on Newsweek and Time magazines. It was founded to support for the supposedly liberal wing of the military forces. The headquarters of the magazine was in Buenos Aires.

The magazine was published on a weekly basis and featured articles on culture and current affairs. The weekly had a nationalist stance. It also supported for cultural nationalism and modernization as well as political authoritarianism.

It was the first magazine to publish the comic strip Mafalda. Mafalda, produced by Joaquin Salvador Lavado, was first published in the magazine on 29 September 1964. Primera Plana was also the first magazine in Argentine which published a list of best-selling books. In June 1964 the magazine initiated an annual literary prize. In 1967 Daniel Moyano's novel El Oscuro won the prize.

Peruvian novelist Mario Vargas Llosa was the Lima correspondent of Primera Plana. Argentine author Tomas Eloy Martinez was one of the editors-in-chief of the magazine.

During its existence Primera Plana was closed down by military government several times. In 1971 Juan Perón acquired the magazine when he was in exile in Spain. It ceased publication in 1973.
