= Art Spiegelman: Disaster Is My Muse =

2024 documentary film

- Film poster
- Directed by: Molly Bernstein; Philip Dolin
- Produced by: Molly Bernstein; Philip Dolin; Sam Jinishian; Alicia Sams
- Starring: Art Spiegelman
- Edited by: Molly Bernstein
- Music by: Michael Leonhart
- Release dates: November 16, 2024 (DOC NYC); February 21, 2025
- Running time: 98 minutes
- Country: United States
- Language: English

Art Spiegelman: Disaster Is My Muse is a 2024 American documentary film about the cartoonist Art Spiegelman. It is produced and directed by Molly Bernstein and Philip Dolin. It premiered at DOC NYC in November 2024. It was given a limited theatrical release on February 21, 2025, and aired on PBS on April 15, 2025, as part of the American Masters series.

== PBS edit ==
When the film aired on PBS, a segment showing a Spiegelman cartoon which criticized Donald Trump was removed from the broadcast edit. The cut was ordered by PBS on April 3, 2025, twelve days before the film's airdate. The documentary's producers and directors characterized the move as self-censorship amid Trump's efforts to end federal funding for PBS. In response, a WNET executive said that the cartoon, which depicts in one panel what The New York Times describes as "fly-infested feces on Trump's head", was removed on the grounds of distastefulness.

== Reception ==
On the review aggregator website Rotten Tomatoes, 100% of 18 critics' reviews are positive, with an average rating of 8.4/10. Metacritic, which uses a weighted average, assigned the film a score of 73 out of 100, based on five critics, indicating "generally favorable" reviews.

Carlos Aguilar of Variety wrote, "Considering how groundbreaking Spiegelman was in his field, as well as the interdisciplinary connections present in his path, one might hope that a tribute to his transgressive oeuvre would take more formal risks. Alas, while the comics themselves have prominence on-screen in their static form, the doc remains a proficient, engaging portrait, but an unadventurous one." Glenn Kenny of RogerEbert.com gave the film four out of four stars and wrote that it's "a remarkably cogent and compelling presentation not just of Spiegelman's life story but also his personality and art".
