= Oldřich Jelínek =

Czech illustrator (1930–2025)

- Born: 26 February 1930; Košice, Czechoslovakia
- Died: 17 November 2025 (aged 95); Czech Republic
- Education: AVU
- Occupations: Illustrator, graphic artist, caricaturist

Signature
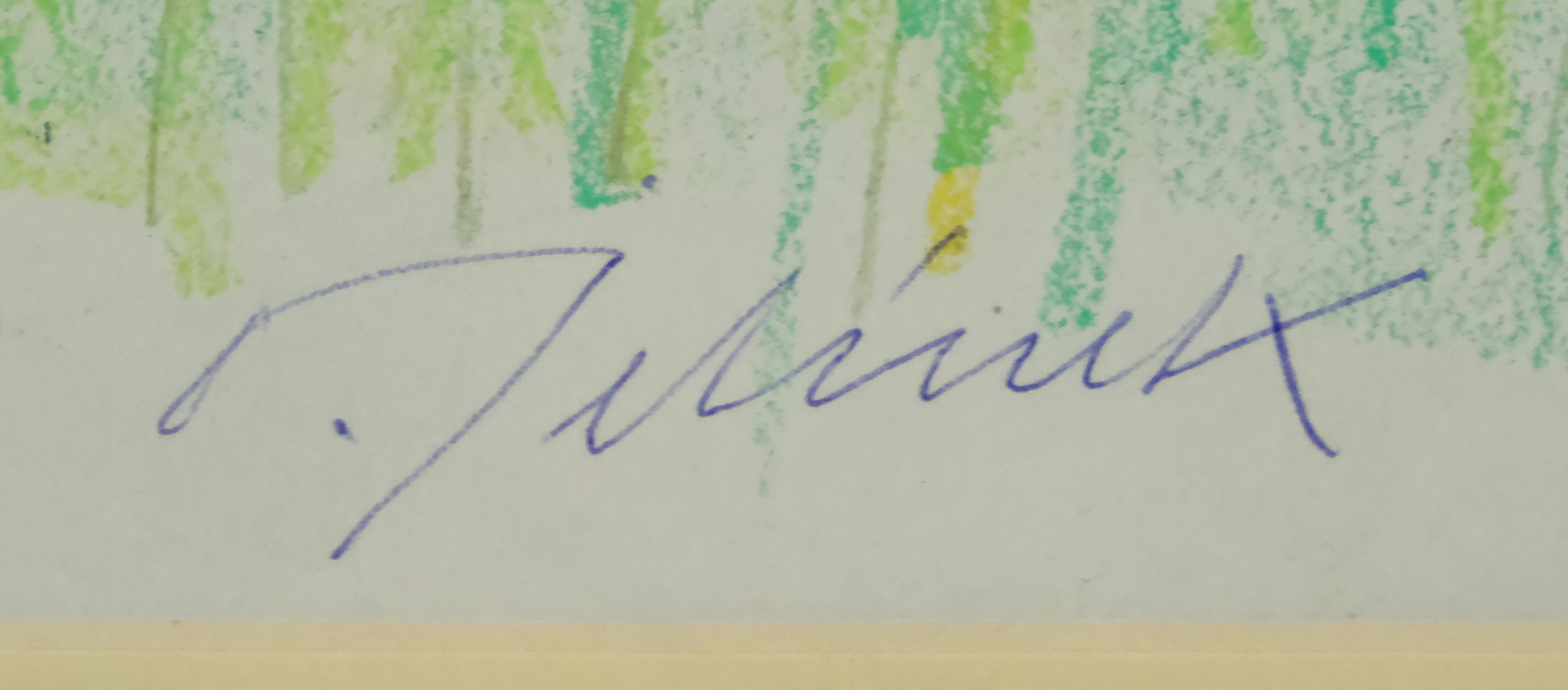

Oldřich Jelínek (26 February 1930 – 17 November 2025) was a Czech illustrator, graphic artist, and caricaturist.

== Life and career ==
Jelínek was born in Košice, Czechoslovakia on 26 February 1930. His parents were Czech-born, Oldřich and Jarmila Jelínek, who had moved to Eastern Slovakia during the economic crisis to work.

During his time at the Academy of Arts, Architecture and Design in Prague, he met Adolf Born, and the pair collaborated on illustrations to periodicals, and also illustrated Andrei Sergeyevich Nekrasov's The Adventures of Captain Zhvanilkin.

In 1981, he and his family decided to leave Czechoslovakia permanently and settled in Munich. In Czechoslovakia, the communist regime was not in favor of him, because in his drawings he often depicted Western themes, traveling behind the Iron Curtain, etc., and his later caricatures and cartoons were critical of the socialist system. In Germany, he became famous for his advertising work, caricatures, and illustrations for the German magazine Computerwoche, and book illustrations.

In 2016, Jelínek donated a significant part of his work from the Munich period to the Gallery of Fine Arts in Havlíčkův Brod, and a year later, he expanded his donation to include older graphic work (a total of 214 works).

In 2020, he received the Golden Ribbon for his lifetime contribution to children's and youth literature.

Jelínek moved from Munich to Prague in 2021, among other things, because his Czech citizenship was restored.

== Death ==
Jelínek died on 17 November 2025, at the age of 95.
