= Jim Silke =

American graphic designer and screenwriter (1931–2025)

Jim Silke (May 19, 1931 – February 16, 2025) was an American graphic designer, screenwriter and comic book artist. He wrote the scripts for the 1983 film Sahara and the 1985 film King Solomon's Mines. In 1994, he created the comic book limited series Rascals in Paradise.

Over the course of his career, Silke was nominated for four Grammy Awards for best album design. He won in 1962 for his cover for Judy at Carnegie Hall. Silke died on February 16, 2025, at the age of 93.
