= Shohei Harumoto =

Japanese manga artist (died 2025)

- Born: Nerima, Tokyo, Japan
- Died: July 27, 2025
- Area: Manga artist
- Notable works: Kirin; SS

Shohei Harumoto (東本 昌平, Harumoto Shōhei; 5 September ?-27 July 2025) was a Japanese manga artist from Nerima, Tokyo.

Harumoto made his debut with a regular serialisation in Weekly Manga Action, in 1987, his first breakthrough manga called Kirin, about street racing centered on a motorcycle was serialised in the motorcycle magazine, Mr Bike BG.

The majority of his work tended to be about motorcycles with the exception of SS which is centralised about cars.

His manga SS was adapted into a live-action film that was released on January 12, 2008. Kirin also received a live-action film adaptation that was released on March 3, 2012.

Harumoto died on 27 July 2025.

== Known works ==
=== Manga/book ===
Title	Publisher	Volume	Serialisation	Year of print	Note
Kirin	Weekly Manga Action; Shōnen Gahosha	〜34		1987	known in Asian prints as Thunderstorm Rider (暴風騎士)
SS	Shogakukan	9	Big Comic Superior	2000〜2003	
Hi! Hi! Hi!	Shōnen Gahosha	3		2004	
CB Gan	Shogakukan	8	Big Comic Spirits	2004〜2007	
Tekkon: Shohei Harumoto Illustration Works	Shōnen Gahosha			2004	
Shohei Harumoto Ride		〜6		〜	

=== Character design ===
- The Screamer (Magical Zoo, 1985)
