= Mafalda =

Argentine comic strip by Quino 1964–1973

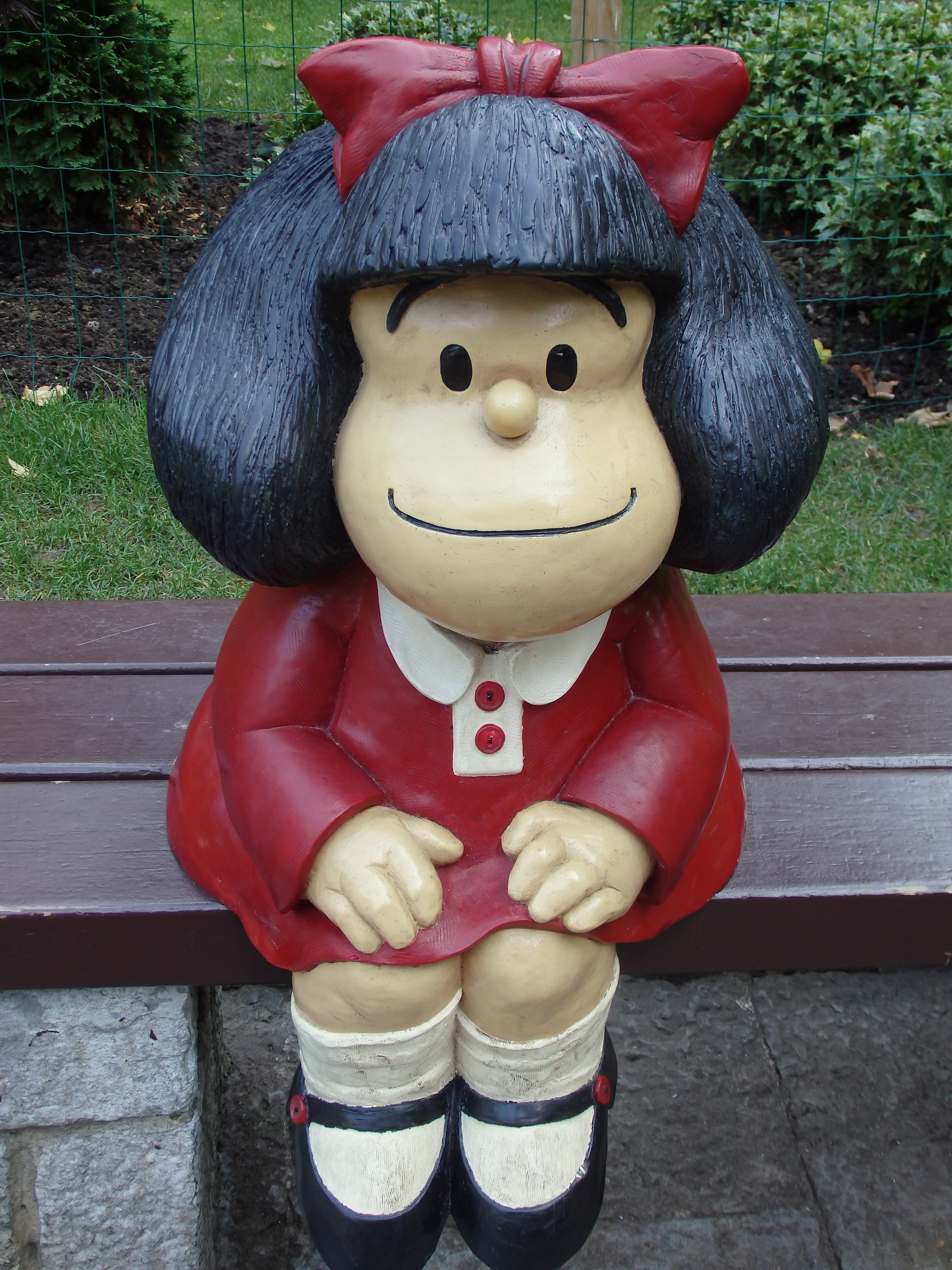
- A statue of Mafalda in Spain
- Author: Quino
- Current status/schedule: Ended
- Launch date: 29 September 1964
- End date: 25 June 1973
- Publisher(s): Primera Plana (1964–65); El Mundo (1965–67); Siete Días Ilustrados (1968–73)
- Genre(s): Humor, social commentary

Mafalda (Spanish: [maˈfalda]) is an Argentine comic strip written and drawn by cartoonist Quino. The strip features a six-year-old girl named Mafalda, who reflects the Argentine middle class and progressive youth, is concerned about humanity and world peace, and has an innocent but serious attitude toward problems. The comic strip ran from 1964 to 1973 and was very popular in Latin America, Europe (especially Spain), Quebec, and Asia. Its popularity led to books and two animated cartoon series. Mafalda has been praised as masterful satire.

== History ==
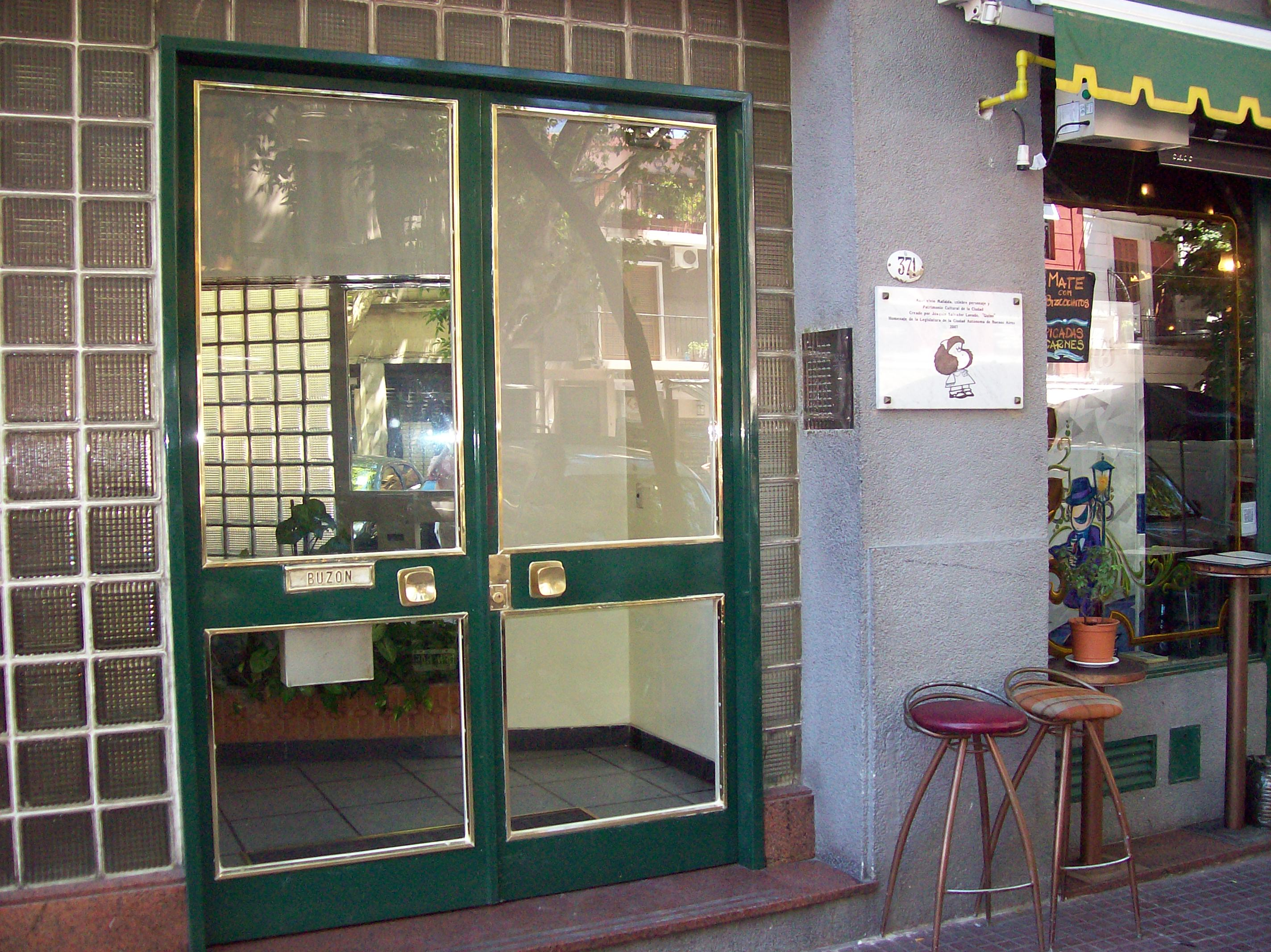
The entrance to a small residential building in Buenos Aires that stands close to the house where Quino lived humbly for 22 years. It was probably used as inspiration for Mafalda's home. Currently, there is a plaque honoring the cartoon.

The comic strip artist Quino created Mafalda in 1963. He had received a proposal by fellow artist Miguel Brascó, and the comic strip would be a covert advertisement for the "Mansfield" line of products of the Siam Di Tella company. The characters would use their products, and all of them would have names starting with "M". The name "Mafalda" was selected as an homage to one of the characters of the 1962 Argentine film Dar la cara. The comic strip was conceived as a blend of Peanuts and Blondie. Quino and Brascó offered the comic strip to the newspaper Clarín, but they noticed the advertisement nature and did not publish it. The covert advertising campaign was never carried out, but Brascó published portions of those comics at the magazine Leoplán.

Julián Delgado, senior editor of the magazine Primera Plana, proposed to publish the comic strip if Quino removed the advertisements. It was first published in the magazine on 29 September 1964. Initially, it featured only Mafalda and her parents. Felipe was introduced in January. Quino left the magazine in 1965, and the comic strip moved to the newspaper El Mundo. Quino introduced new kids: Manolito, Susanita, and Miguelito; and Mafalda's mother became pregnant. The newspaper was closed in December 1967.

Publication resumed six months later, on 2 June 1968, in the weekly Siete Días Ilustrados. Since the cartoons now had to be delivered two weeks before publication, Quino was not able to comment on the news to the same extent. After creating the characters of Mafalda's little brother Guille and her new friend Libertad, he definitively ceased publication of the strip on 25 June 1973.

After 1973, Quino still drew Mafalda a few times, mostly to promote human rights. In 1976, he reproduced Mafalda for the UNICEF illustrating the Convention on the Rights of the Child.

== Characters ==
The comic strip is composed of the main character Mafalda, her parents and a group of other children. However, the group was not created on purpose, but was instead a result of the development of the comic strip. The other children were created one at a time, and worked by countering specific aspects of Mafalda. The exception was Guille, Mafalda's brother, who was introduced during a period when the author did not have other ideas.

- Mafalda: A six-year-old girl with a great concern for the state of humanity. She often leaves her parents at a loss by asking about mature or complex topics. Although she uses her intelligence to manipulate her parents into letting her do what she wants at times, she is shown to be very benevolent and righteous, and does what she can for her family and friends. Mafalda is generally a pessimist to the point of being accused of being so by her friends; to this she responds that things are not so bad as to stop discussing them. A constant trait is her dislike of soup.
- Mamá ("Mom") (Raquel, 6 October 1964) and Papá ("Dad") (29 September 1964): Mafalda's parents are a very normal couple, more concerned with family welfare than external political or social issues. Mafalda is often critical of her mom's ready acceptance of housewife status; her dad often tries to avoid Mafalda's snarky remarks and probing questions, although he very much sympathizes with the kid's scary view of school life. He is an avid horticulturist, and proven capable of rambling on about specific topics if given the chance. Raquel appears to have been a talented pianist who left college before graduating in order to marry and raise a family; Mafalda's father has a job as some sort of insurance agent and occasionally smokes. Their car is a Citroën 3CV hatchback, which was a popular entry-level model for middle-class Argentines in the 1960s.
- Felipe ("Phillip") (19 January 1965): The brightest and oldest member of the gang, Felipe is a good-natured dreamer who is usually lost in his fantasies and imagination and is also deeply scared of school. He often wages intense internal battles with his conscience, innate sense of responsibility, and top school grades that he hates ("That is the worst good news I've ever been given!"). A consummate procrastinator, he loves to play cowboys and read comics, especially the Lone Ranger. Late in the series, he also has a crush on a girl named Muriel (name given by Susanita). He is characterized by his hair and buckteeth.
- Manolito (Manuel Goreiro Jr., 29 March 1965): The son of a Spanish shopkeeper, he is sometimes referred to as gallego (Galician). His surname hints at such an origin, but it is common practice in Argentina to refer to all Spanish migrants as Galicians. Manolito and his father follow the Argentine stereotype of the gallego, dull and stingy. While his family business is but a small, local grocery store, he seems ambitious with his career and is more concerned with notions of business, capitalism, and dollars, than anything else. He's always promoting the store and its products in street graffiti and even in ordinary conversations. He's shown to be simple-minded, but sometimes appears creative when it comes to business plans. He never goes on a vacation because of his father, who owns the store they work in; both appear to enjoy making money. The quality of the products sold is often questionable, as many people have complained to him and/or his father often. Manolito is characterized by his brush-like crew cut hair.
- Susanita (Susana Beatriz Clotilde Chirusi, 6 June 1965): A frivolous girl with curly blond hair, who displays stereotypical feminine traits; her life revolves around femininity, gossip, dreams of marriage and maternity, and woman antagonism. Her dream is to be a mother and dedicated housewife and she often fantasizes about the possibilities, which often leads to arguments with Mafalda. She is, however, the latter's best female friend despite their bickering ("Well... you know... I'd rather freak out at you than at a complete stranger"). She and Manolito seem to be at odds, but tolerate each other for Mafalda's sake, although it is shown that Susanita is more often the perpetrator of their bickering; as the attacks are often one-sided, Manolito is caught off-guard most of the time, but on occasion he gains the upper hand. At times, she seems to have a crush on Felipe. She is sometimes shown as a glutton, usually regretting sharing with her friends or tricking them out of their snack. She is also racist to a major extent, though at one point she denies this (and unknowingly makes a racist remark that contradicts her point).
- Miguelito (Miguel Pitti, 1966): About two years younger than Felipe and one year younger than Mafalda and the others, characterized by his lettuce-shaped hair. He appears in the series sometime later. Somewhat of a rebel, most of the time he is a little too eager to get into philosophical debates. Although he is characterized as "innocent" by his friends (and, indeed, proving to be very naive at times), he often surprises them with comments ridden with cynicism, pedantry, and even sociopathy. A descendant of Italian immigrants, his grandfather is very fond of Benito Mussolini. He appears to have a harsh, houseproud mother, of whom he is frightened.
- Guille (Guillermo, 1968) or Nando in some translations: Mafalda's little brother. He loves soup (much to his sister's chagrin), has a pathological dependence on his pacifier, and he and Mafalda have a pet tortoise called Burocracia (Bureaucracy). He is somewhat cynical and prone to histrionics, with the prime target being his mother. He is a bit of a troublemaker and appears to share the same trait as his sister in terms of bringing up awkward topics of discussion.
- Libertad (5 February 1970): "Libertad" is a given name in Spanish, which means "Freedom". The girl is of small stature (a little shorter than Guille although she is around the age of the other kids), a reference to the impotence or small stature of freedom. Libertad appears somewhat later in the series, after Mafalda befriends her at the beach during a vacation, where she introduces herself to Mafalda, and, after an awkward silence, she inquires: "Have you drawn your stupid conclusion yet? Everyone draws their stupid conclusion when they meet me". She is the most politically radical character of the comic strip, more even than Mafalda herself. She took the place of being the political one while Mafalda became more well rounded in her topics of discussion. Although she claims to be fond of simple people, she often overthinks or overreacts to her friend's opinions on simple topics like vacations or pets. She often gets in trouble with her teachers due to her point of view.
- Muriel: Felipe's crush. Although he could never actually speak to his neighbor, it appears that Susanita knows everything about her, as well as everything else, because of her gossipy behaviour. Although she is not part of the gang, she appears occasionally on strips always featuring Felipe's lack of concentration when she is near, or his attempts to encourage himself to make conversation with her, attempts of which Felipe has never been able to carry out due to his extreme shyness.

The characters aged at about half the real time-scale while the script ran. They also went through minor changes largely due to the evolution of Quino's drawing style.

== Books and translations ==
Most strips that were not too closely tied to then-current events were chronologically republished in ten small books simply named Mafalda and numbered from one to ten, with two strips on each page. This excludes the very first ones, published in Primera Plana, but never reprinted until 1989.

The Argentine editions are as follows, published by Ediciones de la Flor (except for the first five books, which were first published by Editorial Jorge Álvarez)

- Mafalda (1966)
- Así es la cosa, Mafalda (This is the way things are, Mafalda) (1967)
- Mafalda 3 (1968)
- Mafalda 4 (1968)
- Mafalda 5 (1969)
- Mafalda 6 (1970)
- Mafalda 7 (1972)
- Mafalda 8 (1973)
- Mafalda 9 (1974)
- Mafalda 10 (1974)
- Mafalda Inédita (Unpublished Mafalda) (1989)
- 10 Años con Mafalda (Ten years with Mafalda) (1991)
- Toda Mafalda (The Whole Mafalda) (1992)

The editions differ in other countries: in Spain, the small books are numbered from 0 to 10 and the full compilation is called Todo Mafalda, all published by Editorial Lumen; in Mexico, the small books go from 1 to 12 and are currently published by Tusquets Editores.

Mafalda has been translated into around twenty languages, including English, Chinese, Japanese, Guarani, Hebrew, and Armenian. There is also a Spanish Braille version.

Beginning in 2004, Quino's publisher in Argentina, Ediciones de la Flor, started publishing English-language collections of Mafalda strips under the series title Mafalda & Friends. In the United States of America, an English version of Mafalda, translated by Frank Wynne, started being released in 2025 by Elsewhere Editions.

== Adaptations ==
Quino has opposed adapting Mafalda for cinema or theater; however, two series of animated shorts featuring Mafalda have been produced. The first, a series of 260 90-second films, was produced by Daniel Mallo for Argentine television starting in 1972. These were adapted into a full-length movie by Carlos Márquez in 1979 and released in 1981. It remains relatively unknown. In 1993 Cuban filmmaker Juan Padrón, a close friend of Quino, directed 104 short animated Mafalda films, backed by Spanish producers.

In 2024, a Netflix-exclusive Mafalda animated series was announced; it will be written by director Juan José Campanella.

== Comparisons ==
Mafalda has occasionally been pointed out as being influenced by Charles Schulz's Peanuts, most notably by Umberto Eco, in 1968, who contrasted the two characters. While Eco thought of Mafalda and Charlie Brown as the unheard voices of children in the northern and southern hemispheres, Quino saw Mafalda as a socio-political strip, firmly rooted on family values. This is one of the reasons adults play a starring role in the strip, while they are never seen in the Charlie Brown universe. Quino does, however, acknowledge the influence of Schulz's work on his, in that Quino extensively studied Schulz's books in preparation for an advertising campaign he was working on in 1963. The advertising campaign was scrapped but he reused some of the material for the Mafalda series a year later.

The appearance of Mafalda's character resembles that of the main character in the U.S. comic strip Nancy (known as Periquita in Latin America). There is also a reference in a strip where Miguelito buys a magazine that has Nancy on the cover, and asks Mafalda whom she looks like. In the next panel is implied that Mafalda replied, "¡Tu abuela!" ("Your granny!"), a phrase similar to "Your mama!" in English, as Miguelito stares at the magazine wondering, "My granny?"

== Recognition ==
In 2009, a life-sized statue of Mafalda was installed in front of Quino's old home in the San Telmo neighborhood of Buenos Aires.

In 2010, it was announced that the city of Gatineau, Quebec, Canada, had sought and obtained permission to name or rename a street after Mafalda, as part of a project to establish a neighbourhood named after famous comic strips and bande dessinée characters.

In 2014, a life-sized statue of Mafalda was installed in Campo de San Francisco, a park located in Oviedo, Principality of Asturias' capital (northern Spain), after the Princess of Asturias Awards was conferred to Quino, for the creation of Mafalda, in the category of Communications and Humanities.

== In other media ==
=== DC Cinematic Universe ===
- In 2021 film The Suicide Squad and TV Series The Peacemaker made by James Gunn, a Mafalda keychain appears for brief moments.

=== Toys ===
- On July 18, 2019, the ColeccionablesBlog page made several figures of Mafalda and her friends.

== See also ==
- Quino bibliography
- Argentine humour
