= Marie-Mad =

French illustrator and comic books author (1922–2025)

- Born: Marie-Madeleine Bourdin; 27 November 1922; Paris, France
- Died: 11 August 2025 (aged 102); Vernon, France
- Education: École Duperré
- Occupations: Illustrator; Author

Marie-Madeleine Bourdin, better known by the pen name Marie-Mad, (27 November 1922 – 11 August 2025) was a French illustrator and comic books author.

== Life and career ==
Born in Paris on 27 November 1922, Bourdin was the daughter of a mechanical engineer and a seamstress. She created her first works during World War II while attending the École Duperré, where she met illustrator Manon Iessel. Her only adventure comic book, titled Lumière dans la tour, was published by Âmes vaillantes. In 1954, the magazine Cœurs Vaillants published her series titled Petit frère et petite sœur. Her series Titounet et Titounette was published in 52 editions by the magazine Perlin et Pinpin. Bourdin often credited her sister's nine children as inspiration for her comic strips.

Marie-Mad died in Vernon on 11 August 2025, at the age of 102.

== Works ==
=== Standalone ===
- Histoire d'une petite cévenole ou le Miracle de Notre-Dame Marie Rivier (1954)

=== Stories with Éditions Fleurus ===
- Titounet et la fête de la forêt (1956)
- Lumière dans la tour (47 editions, 1958–1968)
- Titounet - Madame Binocle et la fin de l'année (1972)
