= Gene Dogs =

Fictional comic book characters

Publication information
- Publisher: Marvel UK
- First appearance: Gene Dogs #1 (October 1993)
- Created by: John Freeman; Dave Taylor

In-story information
- Type of organization: Counter-terrorism squad
- Base(s): S.T.O.R.M. headquarters (North Wales)
- Agent(s): Cat; Howitzer; Kestrel; Pacer; Panther; Tyr

Gene Dogs are fictional characters appearing in American comic books published by Marvel Comics, particularly in the Marvel UK imprint. Originally members of an elite counter-terrorism squad known as Team Omega, five dying soldiers become the Gene Dogs after an experimental medical process saves their lives by modifying their DNA, a process which also grants them superhuman abilities. After their transformation, the squad continue to work as a team, now employed by a secret new European defense organization, S.T.O.R.M.

The characters first appeared in Gene Dogs #1 (Oct. 1993), the first part of a four-issue limited series that was promoted as part of Marvel UK's "Gene Pool" event. The Gene Dogs were created by John Freeman and Dave Taylor.

== Publication history ==
Along with Gun Runner and Genetix, Gene Dogs was one of three limited series launched together under the 'Gene Pool' banner and "linked by a common thread - genetic mutation". As part of this promotion, the first issue of each series was shipped polybagged with collectable "Gene Cards" profiling the characters.

Like the other Marvel UK titles of the time, the Gene Dogs series was set in the shared Marvel Universe and used Marvel UK's villainous Mys-Tech corporation as an important part of its plot. Gene Dogs also briefly crossed over with Genetix, with the Genetix team guest-starring in Gene Dogs #2 (Nov. 1993) and the Gene Dogs later appearing in Genetix.

Writer John Freeman has since commented that Gene Dogs was "intended to be a British X-Men"

== Fictional history ==
The soldiers who would come to be called the Gene Dogs were originally part of an elite counter-terrorist squad called Team Omega. During a mission in the Congo, they were attacked by an unknown creature and infected with a deadly virus. In order to save their lives, they were spliced with animal DNA, as well as receiving bio-wetware chips in the cerebral cortex to enhance their abilities.

== Members ==
The Gene Dogs consist of:

- Tyr (Marc Devlin) - Spliced with dinosaur DNA, he has superhuman strength and durability. Tyr is bad-tempered and violent. He was Panther's lover and resented Cat for taking her place.
- Pacer (Carlos De Silva) - He has the genes of an unknown predatory animal. In addition to heightened physical abilities and fighting skills, he also has superior tracking skills.
- Howitzer (Shaka) - Spliced with a large sea mammal, he is immensely strong but requires a special cooling suit to maintain his body temperature. He specializes in heavy weapons and is the most calm and level-headed of the group.
- Kestrel (Annie Jones) - Able to create crystalline wings which allow flight and have razor-sharp edges. She is also a computer expert.
- Cat (Emma Malone) - Expert fighter. She also has telepathic abilities. Cat was sent to learn who the traitor in the group was.
- Panther (Corinne Walton) - A traitor working for Mys-Tech. She was Tyr's lover and had enhanced senses and athletic abilities.
