= SS (manga) =

Japanese manga series

- First tankōbon volume cover
- Manga
- Written by: Shohei Harumoto
- Published by: Shogakukan
- Magazine: Big Comic Superior
- Original run: 2000 – 2003
- Volumes: 9
- Live-action film
- Directed by: Yoshinori Kobayashi
- Produced by: Hirokazu Okajima; Chikara Kamiko
- Written by: Masashi Sogo
- Studio: Libero
- Released: January 12, 2008
- Runtime: 100 minutes
- icon

SS (stands for Special Stage) is a Japanese manga series written and illustrated by Shohei Harumoto. It was serialized in Shogakukan's seinen manga magazine Big Comic Superior from 2000 to 2003, with its chapters collected in nine tankōbon volumes. A live-action film adaptation premiered in 2008.

== Plot ==
The story revolves around Daibutsu, a middle aged former rally driver who used to participate in the All Japan Rally Championship and now lives with his wife Kumiko and their son. Daibutsu goes to his garage to rebuild his Mitsubishi Starion 4WD, named Jackie, a Group B rally car which was banned at the end of the 1986 season. He returns to racing by challenging people on the street with his car.

== Media ==
=== Manga ===
Written and illustrated by Shohei Harumoto, SS was serialized in Shogakukan's seinen manga magazine Big Comic Superior from 2000 to 2003. Shogakukan collected its chapters in nine tankōbon volumes, released from May 30, 2000, to August 30, 2003.

==== Volumes ====
No.	Release date	ISBN
1	May 30, 2000	4-09-185651-9
2	November 30, 2000	4-09-185652-7
3	March 30, 2001	4-09-185653-5
4	July 30, 2001	4-09-185654-3
5	February 28, 2002	4-09-185655-1
6	August 30, 2002	4-09-185656-X
7	January 30, 2003	4-09-185657-8
8	April 30, 2003	4-09-185658-6
9	August 30, 2003	4-09-185659-4

=== Live-action film ===
A live-action film adaptation, directed by Yoshinori Kobayashi and distributed by Libero, premiered on January 12, 2008. The film stars Show Aikawa as Daibutsu, Kenichi Endō as Kurihara, Noriko Sakai as Kumiko, and Megumi as Girako.
