= Kirin (manga) =

Manga by Shohei Harumoto

- Manga
- Written by: Shohei Harumoto
- Published by: Shōnen Gahosha
- Magazine: Shōnen King (1987–1988); Young King (1989–2010)
- Original run: 1987 – 2010
- Volumes: 39
- Live-action film
- Directed by: Gitan Ōtsuru
- Released: March 3, 2012

Kirin (キリン) is a Japanese manga series written and illustrated by Shohei Harumoto. Its title character is an office worker who leads a second life as a street-racing motorcyclist. It was adapted into a live action film in 2012.

The series began in 1987 in Mr. Bike BG, a monthly motorcycle magazine published by Motor Magazine. Later chapters ran in Shōnen Gahōsha's Young King until the story concluded in 2010. Shōnen Gahōsha released the final, 39th volume in September 2010. A continuation, Kirin: The Happy Ridder Speedway, ran in Young King from 2010 to 2016.

In Japan the manga acquired a reputation as "the motorcycle-riding bible". A live-action film adaptation directed by Gitan Ōtsuru opened in Japanese theaters in March 2012.

== Publication ==
Harumoto launched Kirin in Mr. Bike BG in 1987. The serialization later moved to Shōnen Gahōsha's seinen magazine Young King, where it continued until 2010. The 39th and final collected volume was published on September 13, 2010. Kirin: The Happy Ridder Speedway, a continuation serialized in the same magazine, was collected in eleven volumes between 2010 and 2016.

In 2010, NTT Solmare distributed the original series in English on Nokia's Ovi store for mobile phones; the release is no longer available. A French edition of Kirin: The Happy Ridder Speedway has been published by Kasaï Éditions since November 2023.

Harumoto died on July 27, 2025. Young King announced his death the following month.

== Live-action film ==
Kirin: Point of No-Return! (キリン POINT OF NO-RETURN！), a live-action adaptation of the manga's first story arc, was released in Japan on March 3, 2012, by Interfilm. Actor Gitan Ōtsuru, himself a well-known motorcyclist, directed the film, with Claude Maki starring as Kirin, a middle-aged rider of a Suzuki Katana who takes on a Porsche 911 in an illegal race on public roads. Ayano co-stars as Tomomi, a young woman Kirin meets in a bar.

== Cast ==
- Claude Maki - Kirin
