= Angelo Maria Ricci =

Italian comics artist (1946–2025)

- Born: 18 June 1946; Rieti, Italy
- Died: 4 August 2025 (aged 79); Grottammare, Italy
- Occupation: Comics artist

Angelo Maria Ricci (18 June 1946 – 4 August 2025) was an Italian comics artist and illustrator, whose career spanned over 50 years.

== Life and career ==
Born in Rieti, Ricci studied at the local Art School before moving to Milan to pursue a career as a cartoonist. He made his professional debut in 1971, collaborating as an illustrator with the editor L'Esperto. He started his career as a comics artist in 1972, illustrating adult comics for Edifumetto.

In 1980, Ricci joined Sergio Bonelli Editore, and made his debut by illustrating a story written by Alfredo Castelli for Mister No. In 1982, he became part of the Martin Mystère staff, contributing to the series until 1993.

After leaving Bonelli, he collaborated on Tiramolla, and illustrated a Young Indiana Jones comics series for Corriere dei Piccoli. In 2001, he started a long-running collaboration as a comics artist on Diabolik, leaving in 2023 for health reasons. Among his last works was the graphic novel Papa Sisto a fumetti, written by Michele Rossi and released on the 500th anniversary of Pope Sixtus V's birth.

Ricci died in Grottammare on 4 August 2025, at the age of 79.
