= Dave Taylor (comics) =

British comic book creator (1964–2025)

Dave A. Taylor
- Born: 1964 Liverpool, England
- Died: 23 August 2025 (aged 60 or 61)
- Areas: Penciller, Artist, Inker, Colourist
- Notable works: Force Works; Batman; Judge Dredd

Dave Taylor (1964 – 23 August 2025) was a British comic book creator. He is best known for his work on Force Works, as well as Batman and Judge Dredd stories.

== Life and career ==
Taylor was born in Liverpool in 1964, and attended the Liverpool Arts School.

He got a job at Marvel UK in 1990, before entering the US comics field in 1994. There he worked on Marvel's Force Works and various DC Batman comics.

Taylor became disillusioned with the American comic book-making process as deadlines were squeezed and he was forced to take on an inker. He was eventually told he would never work in comics again and took a break following a double hernia. He returned to comics thanks to Peter Doherty's reminder that he has always wanted to work on Judge Dredd, and he has been Dredd-related stories for 2000 AD. He has also drawn Doctor Who comics for Titan Comics, and drew the first comics to feature Peter Capaldi's Twelfth Doctor.

Taylor described his influences as "Victorian artwork and turn-of-century artwork, then Moebius, and some Italian and Spanish illustrators. And then of course there are the 2000AD artists, like Esquerra, Mike McMahon and Brian Bolland."

Taylor died on 23 August 2025, at the age of 60 or 61.

== Bibliography ==
Comics work includes:

- Zorro #7-12 (with writers Ron Friedman/Ian Rimmer, Marvel UK, June–November 1991)
- Captain Planet and the Planeteers #6 (pencils, with writer Pat Kelleher and inks by Robin Riggs, Marvel Comics, March 1992)
- Motormouth and Killpower #6, 9 (with Graham Marks and John Freeman (#9), Marvel UK, November 1992, March 1993)
- Warheads #4, 11 (with Nick Vince, Marvel UK, September 1992, May 1993)
- Gene Dogs (with John Freeman, 4-issue mini-series, Marvel UK, 1993)
- War Dancer #4 (pencils, with Jim Shooter/Alan Lee Weiss and inks by Keith Wilson, Defiant Comics, May 1994)
- Force Works #6-7 (pencils with writers Dan Abnett/Andy Lanning, and inks by Rey Garcia, Marvel Comics, January–February, 1995)
- Batman: Riddler - The Riddle Factory (with Matt Wagner, 48-page graphic novella, DC Comics, 1995, ISBN 1-56389-196-4)
- Mr Murray:
  - "Mr. Murray: Mail Order Bride From Space" (with writer Ian Carney, in Negative Burn #37, Caliber Comics, June 1996)
  - "Mr. Murray in Another Hollow Christmas" (with writer Ian Carney, in Negative Burn #38, Caliber Comics, 1996)
  - "Mr. Murray in Shopping Inferno" (with writer Ian Carney, in Negative Burn #39, Caliber Comics, 1996)
  - "Mr. Murray in Apocalypse Soon" (script and art, in Negative Burn #39, Caliber Comics, 1996)
- Tongue*Lash (with Jean-Marc Lofficier/Randy Lofficier, Dark Horse Comics, August–September, 1996)
- The Dreaming #9 (pencils, with Bryan Talbot, and inks by Tayyar Ozkan, Vertigo, February 1997)
- Batman: Shadow of the Bat #50-54, 56-60, 62-64 (with Alan Grant, DC Comics, May 1996 - July 1997)
- "The Choice" (with Dennis O'Neil, in Batman: Legends of the Dark Knight #100, November 1997)
- Tongue*Lash II (with Jean-Marc Lofficier/Randy Lofficier, Dark Horse Comics, February–March, 1999)
- Batman & Superman: World's Finest #1-5, 10 (pencils, with Karl Kesel and inks by Robert Campanella, DC Comics, April–August, 1999, January 2000)
- "Mostly White" (with Bruce Jones, in Flinch #9, Vertigo, February 2000)
- "Prepacked" (with Ian Carney, in Flinch #11, Vertigo, April 2000)
- "Zed, Marj & Mercury" (with Michael Bonner, in Vertigo Secret Files: Hellblazer, one-shot, Vertigo, August 2000)
- "Weird Western Tales" #2, series #2, Vertigo, May 2001
- "Bury me not on the Lone Prairie" (with Jen Van Meter, in Weird Western Tales #4, Vertigo, July 2001)
- Judge Dredd:
  - "How to Succeed in Bizness (without getting caught)" (with John Wagner, in Judge Dredd Megazine #223, 2004)
  - "Judging Ralphy" (with John Wagner, in Judge Dredd Megazine #230, 2005)
  - "Road Stop" (with Gordon Rennie, in 2000 AD #1582-1586, 2008)
  - "The Gift of Mercy " (with John Wagner, in Judge Dredd Megazine #279, January 2009)
  - "High Spirits" (with Ian Edginton, in 2000 AD #1640-1643, June–July, 2009)
- Anderson, Psi Division: "Big Robots" (with Alan Grant, in Judge Dredd Megazine #257-264, 2007)
- "Fast as Fuck" (with Alan Grant, in Wasted #1, Autumn 2008)
- Batman: Death by Design (with Chip Kidd, 122-page graphic novel, DC Comics, 2012, ISBN 978-1-4012-3453-9)

== Sources ==
- Molcher, Michael (April 2008) "Interrogation - The Long and Winding Road" in Judge Dredd Megazine 270
- Dave Taylor at the Grand Comics Database
- Dave Taylor at the Comic Book DB (archived from the original)
- Dave Taylor at Barney
