= Lidwine =

French comic book author and illustrator (1960–2025)

Dominique Legeard
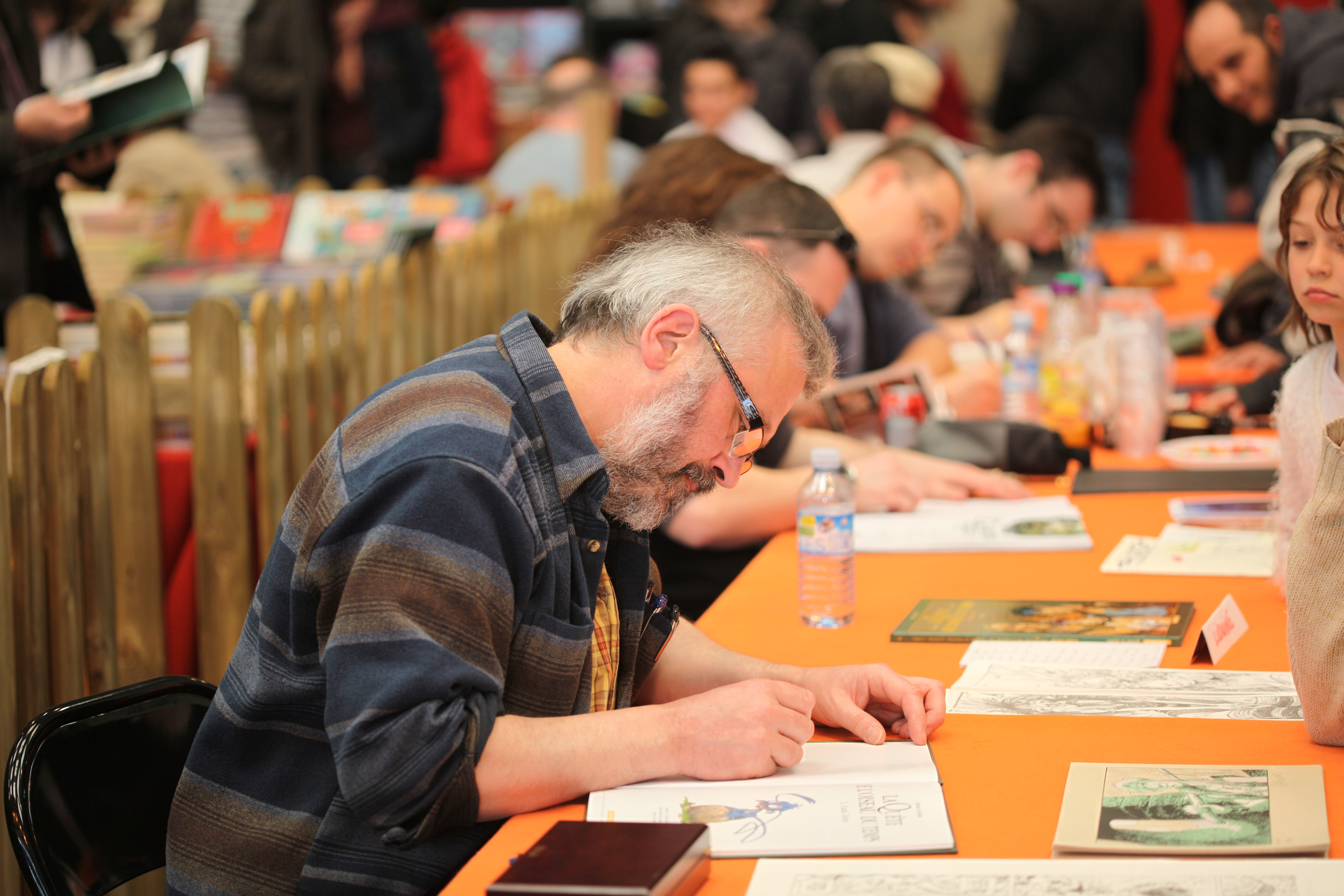
- Lidwine in 2009
- Born: Dominique Legeard; 12 May 1960; Saint-Brieuc, France
- Died: 1 May 2025 (aged 64)
- Other names: Lidwine; Marcel de la gare
- Occupation: Comic book author
- Awards: Prix des libraires de bande dessinée (1995); Alph-Art jeunesse 9–12 ans (1999)

Dominique Legeard (12 May 1960 – 1 May 2025), better known by his pen names Lidwine or Marcel de la gare, was a French comic book author and illustrator.

== Biography ==
Born in Saint-Brieuc on 12 May 1960, Legeard produced several comics in secondary school before publishing his first drawing in Métal Hurlant at the age of 19. In 1983, he made his debut with the magazine Frilouz, where he met a number of young illustrators such as Lucien Rollin, Bélom, Michel Plessix, and Gérard Cousseau. In 1998, he illustrated the fifth volume of La Quête de l'oiseau du temps with writing by Serge Le Tendre and Régis Loisel. Published in October of that year, the volume ended an 11-year hiatus in the series. In 2006, he published Où vont les hommes ?. Later that year, he did illustrations for the collective work Lettres et Carnets du front 1914–1918, the first volume of the Paroles de Poilus series. He had published under the pseudonym "Lidwine" until 2009, when he assumed the pen name "Marcel de la gare".

Lidwine died on 1 May 2025, at the age of 64.

== Works ==
=== Comics ===
- Huguenot (1989)
- Le Dernier Loup d'Oz
- L'ami Javin (1998)
- Lettres et Carnets du front 1914–1918 (2006)
- Souvenirs de films (2009)

=== Humorous drawings ===
- Où vont les hommes ? (2006)
- Tout va de traviole ! (2013)

== Awards ==
- Prix des libraires de bande dessinée (1995)
- Alph-Art jeunesse 9–12 ans (1999)
