= Rascals in Paradise (comics) =

- Cover of trade paperback collection of Rascals in Paradise. Art by Jim Silke.

Publication information
- Publisher: Dark Horse Comics
- Schedule: Monthly
- Format: Limited series
- Genre: Science fiction
- Publication date: August - December 1994
- No. of issues: 3

Creative team
- Written by: Jim Silke
- Artist(s): Jim Silke
- Letterer(s): L. Lois Buhalis

Collected editions
- Rascals in Paradise: ISBN 1-56971-075-9

Rascals in Paradise was a comic book limited series created in 1994 by writer/artist Jim Silke and published by Dark Horse Comics. It was labeled "for mature adults only", and illustrated in a "deco sci-fi" style.

== Plot ==
In the year 2362, a duplicate of Earth is created, ostensibly as a planet-sized vacation resort. However, due to an error or miscalculation, the machine intelligence that was supposed to create the world instead created a planet called Trash-9, a world covered by hostile jungles, wilderness and deserts, and populated by dangerous natives.

== Collected editions ==
In 1995, the series was collected into a trade paperback by Dark Horse Comics (ISBN 1-56971-075-9).
