= Spaceship Away =

British fanzine based on Dan Dare

Spaceship Away is an illustrated full colour fanzine initially based on the British comics space hero Dan Dare and now also covering similar British pop culture.

== Origins and history ==
The publication was inspired by Eagle, a boys' illustrated magazine, published in the UK and running from 1950 to 1969. The character of Dan Dare originally appeared here. Spaceship Away features original stories written and drawn in the style of series creator Frank Hampson.

Spaceship Away was created by Rod Barzilay as an attempt to revive the original Dan Dare of the 1950s and early 1960s. It was born after Rod's efforts to arrange publication of "The Phoenix Mission", a story he had written, and persuaded an original Dan Dare artist Keith Watson to illustrate in pastiche style. This ran up against commercial lack of interest. Barzilay commenced publication of it in 2003 as a vehicle for his story. Other artists and writers with an interest in Dan Dare came on board. Following Watson's death, "The Phoenix Mission" was taken over from the second issue onwards by the legendary original Dan Dare artist Don Harley (who had often shared credit with Hampson himself in the 1950s). There was later help from Tim Booth.

Currently, Spaceship Away now includes "other sci-fi like Charles Chilton's Journey into Space and Sydney Jordan's 'Hal Starr'". As of July 2024, it is still a going concern.

Other regular contributors include Tim Booth, who now co-draws the lead "The Green Nemesis" (the sequel to "The Phoenix Mission" strip), also written by Rod Barzilay; and Keith Page, who drew several revived Dan Dare strips in New Eagle.

== Features ==
"The Green Nemesis" takes place in 2012 in the Sargasso Sea of Space introduced in Hampson's "Reign of the Robots". Keith Page writes and draws "Rocket Pilot" which is set just before Dan's first trip to Venus in 1994, prior to the "Kingfisher" expedition. Tim Booth both writes and draws "The Gates of Eden" which is placed in 1998 at the commencement of the first Treen/Theron food shipments to Earth.

Spaceship Away also runs one-page Dan Dare spoofs such as "Mekki" and "Our Bertie" by Ray Aspden, Eric MacKenzie's "Dan Dire" and "Dan Bear" by Andy Boyce. It also features new Dan Dare text stories by Denis Steeper set in the period immediately after the Eagle's original strips. Here Dan, now called Sir Daniel, has been elevated to Controller-in-Chief of Space Fleet.
