= Enea Riboldi =

Italian comics artist and illustrator (1954–2025)

- Born: 3 August 1954; Milan, Italy
- Died: 8 May 2025 (aged 70); Milan, Italy
- Occupations: Comics artist Illustrator

Enea Riboldi (3 August 1954 – 8 May 2025) was an Italian comics artist and illustrator.

Working in both Italy and France, he notably collaborated with the publishers Éditions Larousse, Casterman, Dargaud, and Glénat Éditions. From 2002 to 2003, he worked on two volumes of L'Encyclopédie humoristique de la voile alongside Stéphane Germain.

Enea Riboldi died in Milan on 8 May 2025, at the age of 70.

== Publications ==
- Sandokan (Le Tigre de Malaisie) - À la conquête de Kin-Ballu (1976)
- Vol solitaire (1988)

=== Nathanaël ===
- Le Chevalier des galaxies (1982)
- Les Amazones (1982)

=== L'Encyclopédie humoristique de la voile ===
- Volume 1 (2002)
- Volume 2 (2003)

=== Cap Horn ===
- La Baie tournée vers l'Est (2005)
- Dans Le Sillage des Cormorans (2009)
- L'Ange noir du Paramo (2011)
- Le Prince de l'âme (2013)
- Intégrale (2014)

=== L'Aigle des mers ===
- Atlantique 1916 (2018)
