= Provolino =

Italian puppet and comic series

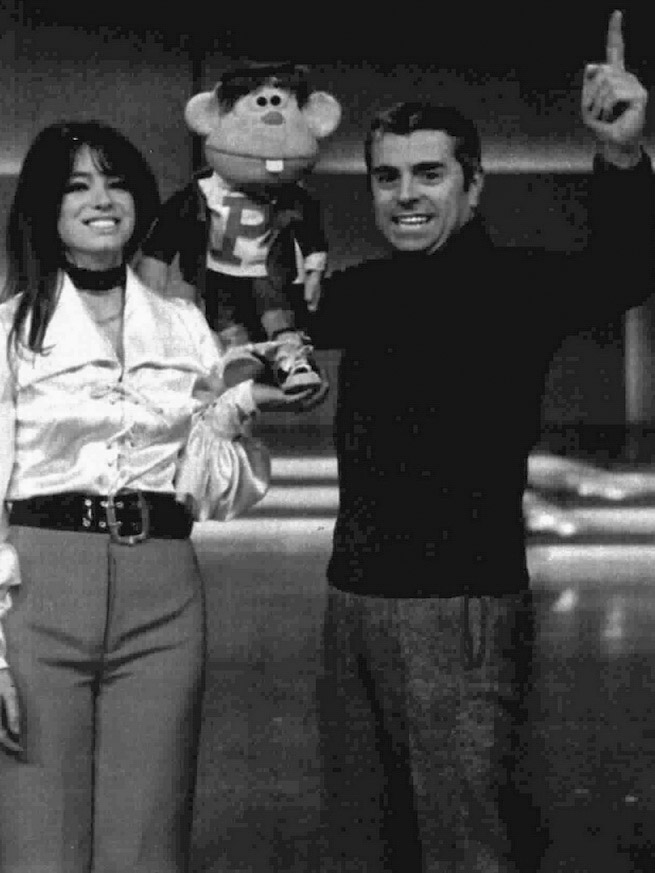
Provolino between Margaret Lee and Raffaele Pisu in 1970.

Provolino was an Italian puppet character who enjoyed huge success in Italy between the late 1960s and early 1970s. He was created by Castellano and Pipolo who also wrote the dialogues.

== Television ==
The puppet was introduced by Raffaele Pisu in the RAI variety shows Vengo anch'io and Ma che domenica amici in 1968. A baby with big teeth, he was featured as the disrespectful alter ego of Pisu, with whom he had constant bickering which always ended with the catchphrase: "Boccaccia mia statti zitta!" (i.e. "bad mouth of mine, please shut up!"). The puppet was animated by Pisu himself and originally voiced by Oreste Lionello, replaced by Franco Latini in 1969.

== Comics adaptation ==
Comic version of Provolino, 1977.

The character was later adapted into a comic series, which was created by Pierluigi Sangalli and Alberico Motta and which became the title character of several comics magazines (Provolino, Super Provolino and Provolino Story) published by editor Bianconi between 1970 and 1990.
