= Walter Fahrer =

Argentine comic book author (1939–2025)

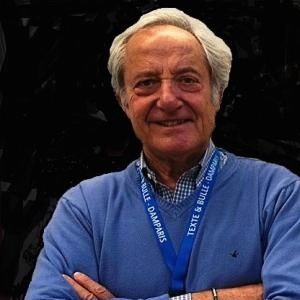
- Fahrer in 2016
- Born: 10 December 1939; Santa Fe, Argentina
- Died: 3 January 2025 (aged 85)
- Occupation: Comic book author

Walter Fahrer (10 December 1939 – 1 March 2025) was an Argentine comic book author and illustrator.

== Life and career ==
Born in Santa Fe on 10 December 1939, Fahrer began his professional career illustrating covers for the magazine Puño fuerte in 1957. In 1962, he left Argentina for Europe alongside Hugo Pratt, writing stories for Editrice Universo, L'Aurore, Le Parisien, and France-Soir. He also wrote a police series published by Casterman titled Mon nom n'est pas Wilson, with the last edition published in 2004.

Fahrer died on 3 March 2025, at the age of 85.

== Publications ==
=== Comics ===
- Cobalt (1971)
- Fugue à quatre mains (1976)
- Harry Chase (1976)
- Une femme a disparu (1979)
- Drôle de bobine (1980)
- Piracicaba, mon amour (1980)
- L'assassiné récalcitrant (1981)
- Adieu Pigeon (1981)
- Fugue à quatre mains (1982)
- Danger immédiat (1983)
- Enquête en 7 jours (1984)
- Le Casque et la Fronde (1987)
- Chili con carne (1989)
- Le Casque et la Fronde
- Captain Hard (1989)
- L'Empire Gilgamesh (1989)
- Gato Montes
- Pour l'honneur (1991)
- La croix du Sud (1993)
- A Corsica (1996)
- Mon nom n'est pas Wilson
  - Pâleur mortelle (2000)
  - Killer (2002)
  - Berlin (2004)
- Laetizia (2004)

=== Documentaries ===
- L'Aventure du journal Tintin (1986)

=== Youth novels ===
- Le dernier des Mohicans (1980)
- Huckleberry Finn (1980)
- Sur le lac Ontario (1980)
- Le bossu (1980)

=== Collections ===
- La Bande à Julien (1997)
- La BD fait sa cuisine (1999)
