= Nonna Abelarda =

Italian comic series

Publication information
- Publisher: Edizioni Bianconi
- Genre: Humor/comedy

Creative team
- Created by: Giovan Battista Carpi

Nonna Abelarda (literally Grandma Abelarda) is a comic fictional character created by Giovan Battista Carpi.

Abelarda first appeared in 1955, as a side character in the Volpetto comic strips; from 1957 to 1991 she also was the main focus of the comic book series Soldino, in the role of nurse and bodyguard of the title character. Over the years she had similar roles in other less successful comic books published by Edizioni Bianconi such as Bongo and Provolino, and was leading character of an eponym comic book, Nonna Abelarda, published between 1971 and 1974.

The comics were also successfully published in France, where Nonna Abelarda was named Tartine Mariol in reference to French actress Martine Carol.
