= Quino =

Argentine cartoonist (1932–2020)

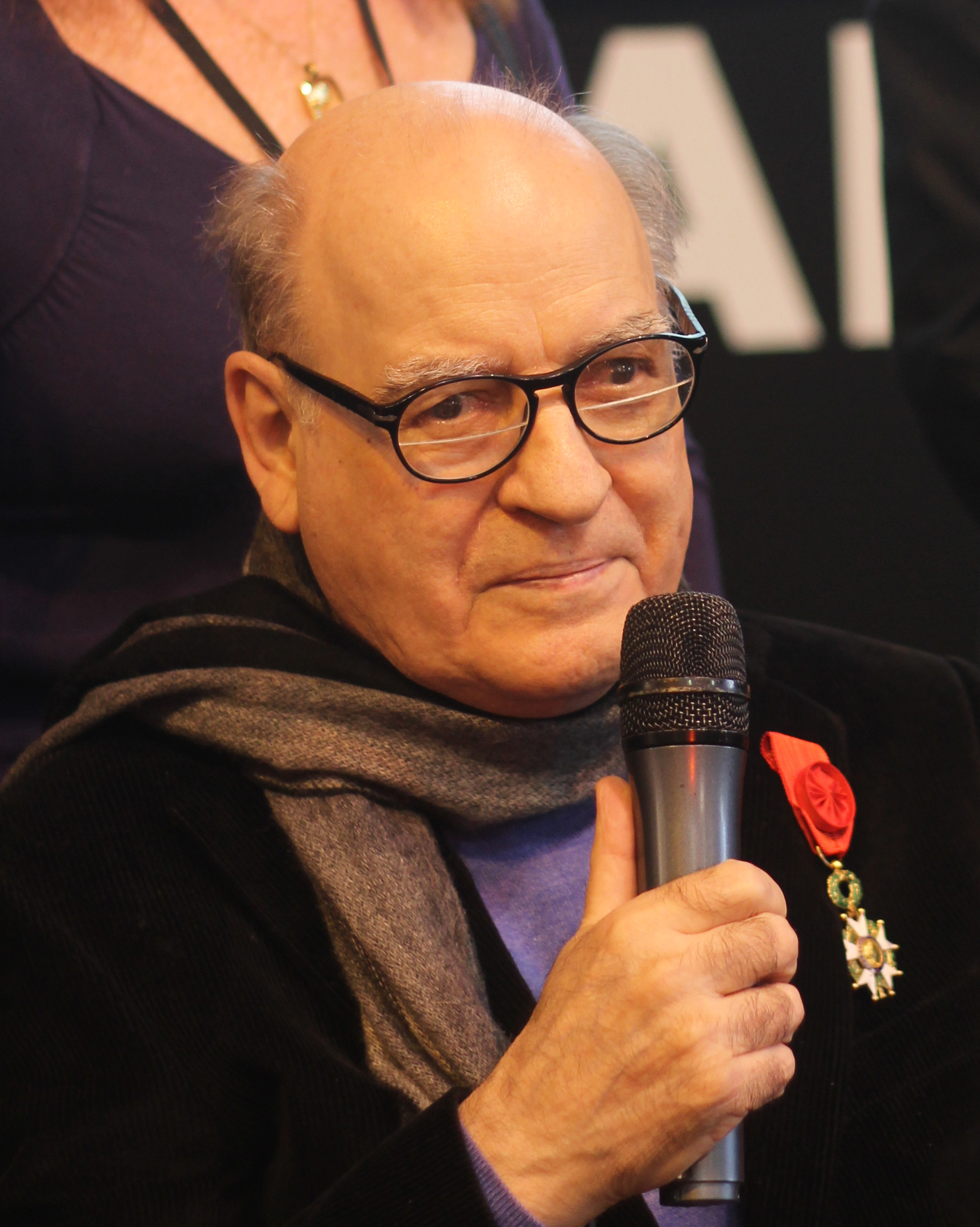
- Quino in 2014 with the French Legion of Honor
- Born: Joaquín Salvador Lavado Tejón; 17 July 1932 Mendoza, Argentina
- Died: 30 September 2020 (aged 88) Mendoza, Argentina
- Area: Cartoonist
- Notable works: Mafalda

Joaquín Salvador Lavado Tejón (17 July 1932 – 30 September 2020), better known by his pen name Quino (Spanish: [ˈkino]), was an Argentine cartoonist. His comic strip Mafalda (which ran from 1964 to 1973) is popular in many parts of the Americas and Europe and has been praised for its use of social satire as a commentary on real-life issues.

== Early life ==
Joaquín Salvador Lavado Tejón was born in Mendoza, Argentina, on 17 July 1932 to emigrant Andalusian parents from Fuengirola, Málaga. Following Spanish name tradition, "Lavado" is his first or paternal surname, and "Tejón" his maternal one. Because of his parents' limited social circle, he spoke with an Andalusian accent until the age of six. He retained an affection for his parents' Spanish culture and flamenco into his later years. He obtained Spanish citizenship in 1990 and remained a dual citizen of Spain and Argentina.

He was called "Quino" from his childhood on, to distinguish him from his uncle, the illustrator Joaquín, who helped to awaken his vocation of cartooning at an early age. In 1945, after the death of his mother, he enrolled and started his studies at Escuela de Bellas Artes de Mendoza. Shortly after, his father died in 1948 when Quino was 16 years old. A year later he abandoned his studies, with the intent to become a cartoonist. Soon he would sell his first illustration, an advertisement for a fabric store.

His first humor page was published in the weekly magazine, Esto Es, which led to the publication of other works in many other magazines: Leoplán, TV Guía, Vea y Lea, Damas y Damitas, Usted, Panorama, Adán, Atlántida, Che, the daily Democracia, etc. In 1954, his cartoons became regulars in Rico Tipo, Tía Vicenta, and Dr. Merengue.

== Career ==
=== Mafalda ===
His first compilation book, Mundo Quino, was published in 1963. At the same time he was developing pages for an advertising campaign for Mansfield, an electrical household appliance company, for which he created the character of Mafalda, basing her name on the same sounds as in the Mansfield brand name. The advertising campaign never was executed, which led to the publication of Mafalda's first story in Leoplán. Subsequently, it appeared regularly in the weekly magazine Primera Plana, since the director of the magazine was a friend of Quino. Between 1965 and 1967 it was published in the newspaper El Mundo; soon after the first compilation book was released, it began to be published in Italy, Spain (where, on account of Franco-era censorship, it was tagged as “for adults only”), Portugal, and many other countries. It was also translated to 12 languages.

Mafalda was created as an irreverent and non-conformist six-year-old who hated fascism, militarism and soup, and loved the Beatles. The character attempted to reflect the world of adults as seen through the eyes of a smart child. Her friends reflected different personalities like the insecure but studious Felipe, the gossip-girl Susanita, the sturdy but dim-witted Manolito, the naive Miguelito, the rebel and witty Libertad and Mafalda's baby brother Guille. The character and the series has been compared to Charles M. Schulz's Peanuts comic series.

Quino abandoned the story of Mafalda on 25 June 1973, claiming that he wanted to avoid repeating himself; in later years, however, he said that the changing political landscape in Latin America had also influenced his decision: "If I had continued drawing her, they would have shot me." Following the 1976 coup d'état in Argentina, he moved to Milan, Italy, where he continued to create humor pages. Although he never returned to Mafalda and her friends in a comic strip format, he did use the character at certain specific moments: to explain the Organic Law on the Right to Education (LODE) on a commission from the Spanish government in 1986, for a COVID-19 awareness campaign in 2020, and, in 1977, to illustrate the Declaration of the Rights of the Child for UNICEF. Argentine producer Daniel Mallo converted 260 Mafalda strips into a TV show in 1965.

In 2008, at the initiative of the Museo del Dibujo y la Ilustración, the company Subterráneos de Buenos Aires created a mural of Mafalda in the Perú metro station at the Plaza de Mayo in Buenos Aires. In 2009, Quino participated with an original Mafalda work, created for El Mundo, in the Bicentennial: 200 years of Graphic Humor that the Museo del Dibujo y la Ilustración held at the Eduardo Sívori Museum of Buenos Aires.

=== Later works ===
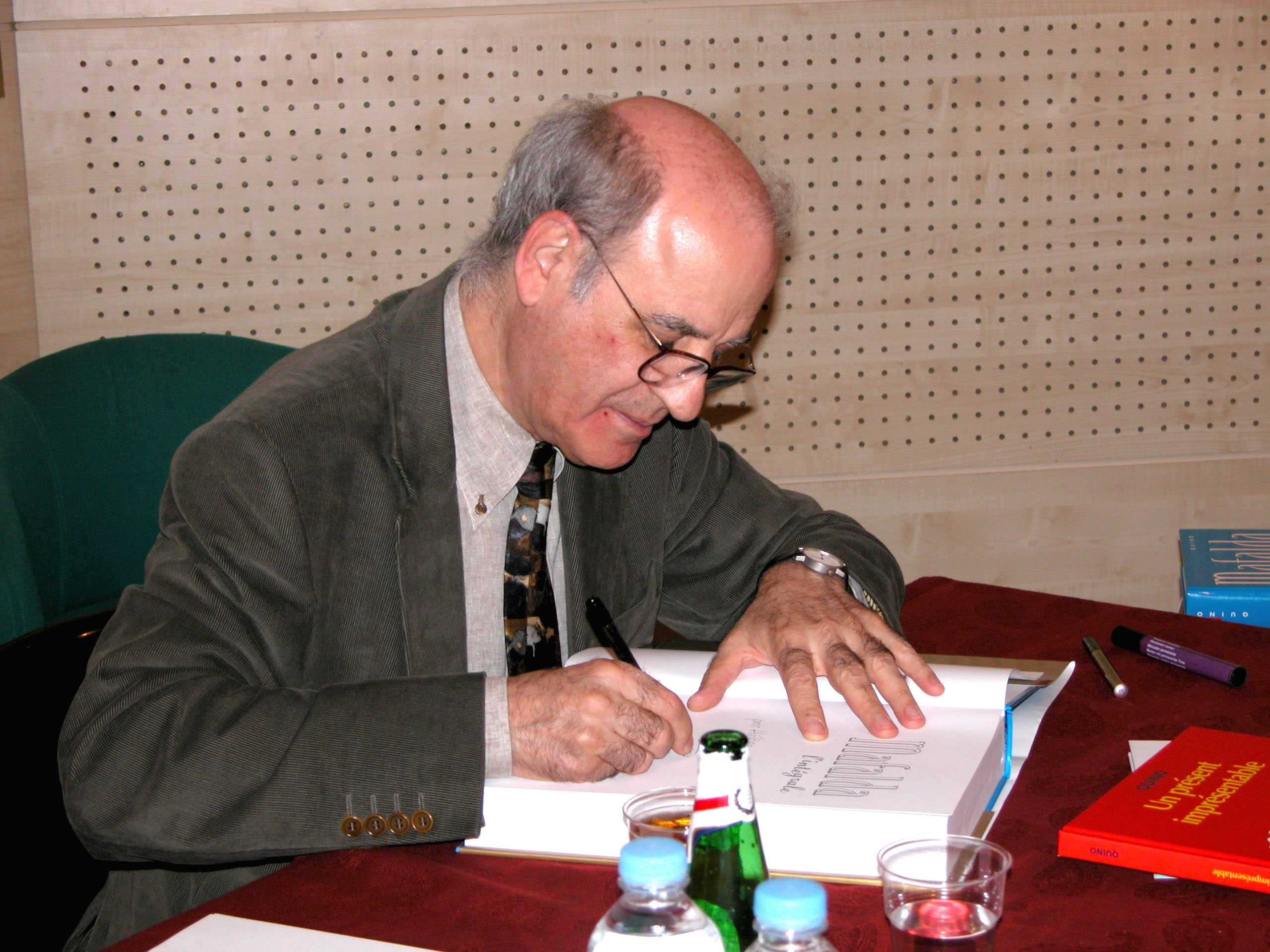
Quino in 2004

While Mafalda continued to be used for human rights campaigns in Argentina and abroad, Quino dedicated himself to writing other editorial-style comics. The comics were published in Argentina and abroad. Since 1982, the Argentine newspaper Clarín has published his cartoons weekly.

After a visit with Cuban cartoon director Juan Padrón, the two produced a series of cartoons. Between 1986 and 1988, they made six Quinoscopio cartoons through the Instituto Cubano del Arte e Industrias Cinematográficos, none of which were longer than six minutes. In addition, the pair worked on 104 short Mafalda cartoons in 1994. Quino eventually retired in 2006. While Mafalda concentrated on children and their innocent, realistic view of the world, his later comics featured ordinary people with ordinary feelings. The humor is characteristically cynical, often poking fun at real-life situations, such as marriage, technology, authority, and food. This cynical humor is attributed as one of the reasons for his success throughout Latin America and much of the world outside Latin America. His cartoons of aporteñado Argentine topic of the 1960s and 1970s have been edited and translated into 26 different languages apart from the original Rioplatense Spanish. Collected in numerous volumes by Argentine publisher Ediciones de la Flor, these comics are readily available.

== Personal life ==
Quino married Alicia Colombo in 1960. The couple never had children. He and his wife lived in exile in Milan starting in 1976, before returning to Argentina seven years later when the military dictatorship came to an end. He subsequently divided his time between Buenos Aires, Madrid, and Milan. He was an agnostic. In 2017, degenerative glaucoma left him nearly blind.

== Collections ==
A portion of Quino's work resides at Vanderbilt University's Special Collections Library, as part of their Eduardo Rosenzvaig collection.

== Awards and honors ==
The kind of ideas that he works with are of the most difficult, and I am amazed at their variety and depth. Also, he knows how to draw, and to draw in a funny way. I think that he is a giant.

— Charles M. Schulz

Quino won many international awards and honors throughout his career. In 1982, Quino was chosen Cartoonist of the Year by fellow cartoonists around the world, he won the Konex Platinum Award for Visual Arts in 1982 and 1992, the Konex Special Mention in 2012 and the Konex of Honour in 2022. In 1988, he was named an Illustrious Citizen of Mendoza. In 1997, he was given U Giancu's Prize at the International Cartoonists Exhibition in Rapallo, Italy. In 2000 he received the second Quevedos Ibero-American Prize for Graphic Humor. In March 2014 he was awarded the French Legion of Honour. Additionally, the Colegiales neighbourhood of Buenos Aires named their plaza Plaza Mafalda.

In May 2014 Quino was presented with the Senator Domingo Faustino Sarmiento cultural award by the Senate of Argentina.

In 2014, Quino was awarded the Prince of Asturias award in recognition of his work, 50 years after creating the character of Mafalda. He received the prize from King Felipe VI of Spain on 24 October 2014 at a ceremony in Oviedo, Spain.

An asteroid discovered in January 1999 was named 27178 Quino after him.

== Death ==
Quino died on 30 September 2020 from a stroke, at the age of 88.
