= Geppo =

Italian comic series

Publication information
- Publisher: Edizioni Bianconi
- Genre: Humor/comedy
- No. of issues: 399

Creative team
- Created by: Giovan Battista Carpi

Geppo is the title character of an Italian comic series created by Giovan Battista Carpi.

== The character ==
Geppo is a good-hearted devil, and his naive, shy, compassionate character creates the continuing problems with his "boss", Satan. Other recurring characters in the series are Satan's guard dog, Cerberus, and the anthropomorphic serpent Salvatore.

== History ==
Geppo officially debuted in 1955 in the comics magazine Volpetto, in the story "Vita nuova... all'inferno!" (trad. "A new life... in hell!"), but an early version of Geppo appeared in December 1954, in the comic book Trottolino e la "Enne" Dimensione (trad. Trottolino and the "N" Dimension), in the story "Geppo il buon diavolo" (trad. "Geppo the good devil"), with a different graphic design realized by Giulio Chierchini.

From 1961, Geppo became the leading character of an eponym comic book series, published for over thirty years by Edizioni Bianconi. Pierluigi Sangalli and later Sandro Dossi alternated as authors of the comic.
