= Flash Gordon: The Greatest Adventure of All =

1982 US animated science fiction-film

- Genre: Space opera; Superhero
- Based on: Characters by Alex Raymond
- Written by: Samuel A. Peeples
- Directed by: Gwen Wentzler
- Starring: Robert Ridgely; Diane Pershing; Bob Holt; Vic Perrin
- Music by: Ray Ellis; Norm Prescott
- Country of origin: United States
- Original language: English

Production
- Executive producers: Norm Prescott; Lou Scheimer
- Producer: Don Christensen
- Cinematography: R.W. Pope
- Editor: Jim Blodgett
- Running time: 95 minutes
- Production companies: Filmation; King Features Syndicate

Original release
- Network: NBC
- Release: August 21, 1982

Flash Gordon: The Greatest Adventure of All is a 1982 American animated television film produced by Filmation and written by Samuel A. Peeples. It was first broadcast in the UK on ITV on December 27, 1981 and in the US on NBC on August 21, 1982.

== Plot ==
During World War II, Flash Gordon is on a mission in Warsaw, which is suffering heavy bombing. He arrives too late and his contact, who is near death, says he has a message for Doctor Zarkov, but can utter only one word, "Mongo", before he dies.

Flash travels to find Zarkov and meets feisty 'girl reporter' Dale Arden, also on her way to interview him. They are bombarded by meteorites, which damage their plane and force them to bail out. On the ground they flee lava flows, and find a secret cave and a rocket ship. Doctor Zarkov, having no time for introductions, ushers them on board and they blast off. When safely in flight, he explains he is on a mission to the wandering planet Mongo to convince their leaders to call off their attack on Earth (by force if necessary, using a gravity weapon of his own invention). For their part, Flash and Dale agree to help him.

Before they can make contact, hostile ships shoot them down, and they make a crash landing. After barely surviving attack by two clashing dinosaurs, they are captured by animalistic savages and dragged to a giant idol to be sacrificed. They barely escape to the outside, where they meet the virtuous King Thun of the Lion Men and help him escape Amazonian hunters led by Princess Aura.

Flash and company are forced into war against Mongo's leader and Aura's father, the maniacal Emperor Ming, and his robotic army of metal men. To help their cause, the heroes lead an alliance formed from freedom fighters led by King Thun, as well as Prince Barin of Arboria; and King Vultan of the Hawkmen.

Thun explains Ming is too clever to conquer Earth by force alone, and that he would use the Mongo strategy of 'separate and attack' which Flash notes is the same as the Earth expression "divide and conquer". Ming reveals he has secretly given military technology to Hitler, leader of the Nazi Party.

Ming sends his Mole Men to attack the kingdom of Arboria by destroying the roots of the trees of the forested land which provides camouflage. Thanks to Zarkov warning Flash and friends, the attack is repulsed and Flash and his allies use the captured drilling machine to attack Ming's palace. They are overwhelmed by Ming's forces, but Prince Barin insists on his right to a trial by strength. With a flaming sword and ion blaster in hand, Ming duels against Flash in an epic fight. However, Ming turns out only to be a android imposter and the real Ming escapes.

With only seconds before Mongo collides with Earth, Flash damages the planet's drive mechanism on Zarkov's advice. With that move making Mongo safely go off course with no way to return to Earth, Flash tells Dale that they have nothing to regret since they are together on a new home of wondrous adventure.

== Cast ==
- Robert Ridgely as Flash Gordon
- Diane Pershing as Dale Arden
- Vic Perrin as Prince Vultan
- Bob Holt as Ming the Merciless
- David Opatoshu as Dr. Hans Zarkov
- Melendy Britt as Princess Aura
- Robert Douglas as Prince Barin
- Ted Cassidy as Prince Thun (final film role)

== Production ==
The original project was produced by Filmation as a made-for-television feature film, partly as a reaction to the mammoth success of Star Wars in 1977. When NBC saw the finished work, it was decided to turn the work into what became the 1979 Saturday-morning animated TV-series Flash Gordon.

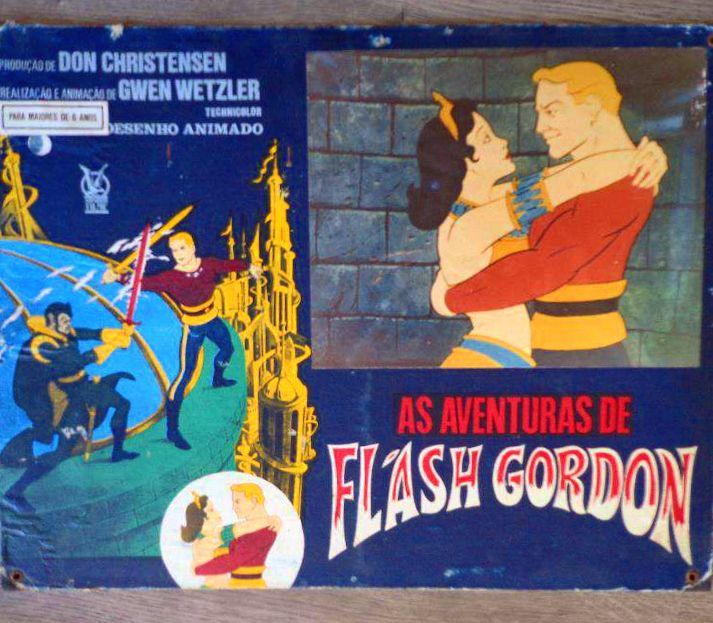
As Aventuras de Flash Gordon

Although the film was developed before the 1979 animated series began, it did not premiere on NBC until 1982. It was shown some months earlier in the UK on ITV on 27 December 1981 at 12.30pm. In fact, some scenes from the film were used in promotional spots for the coming series the summer before the series began in the fall of 1979. The only known commercial releases were by VAP Video in Japan (catalog #67019-128), c. 1983, in both laser disc and NTSC VHS videotape formats, and in Bulgaria, where it was released on VHS twice. The film also aired numerous times on various Bulgarian cable stations in the late 1990s. The Japanese release is presented uncut with the original English voice track, with Japanese subtitles. At the end of the movie is a trailer for the De Laurentiis live-action film, as well as trailers for other titles from the VAP Video library at the time. The covers for both versions feature comic-strip panels, using stills taken from the movie. Its last listing was in VAP Video's catalog for 1983. The Bulgarian releases and TV airings were dubbed. The film was also released theatrically in some European Countries, as evidenced by this portuguese lobby card.

Apart from the subplot involving Ming passing advanced weapons to Hitler, which is not touched upon in the later animated series, there are several other notable differences that seem to indicate that this animated film was intended for prime time, when parents presumably would be watching also. Those differences include:

- The departure of the trio from Earth to Mongo is depicted. In order to make Zarkov sympathetic from the start, the original story element of him forcing Flash and Dale to board his rocket is changed to him inviting them in when they flee into his hidden laboratory/launch site, threatened by flooding molten lava. In this case, Zarkov's rocket is their only chance of survival and they board without hesitation with Zarkov's apologies that he cannot drop them off before continuing to Mongo. For their part, Flash and Dale understand Zarkov's mission and quickly agree to help him.

- The use of 1939 terrestrial firearms by Flash and Zarkov upon arrival while battling a monster.

- A discussion between Flash and Thun indicating that Ming's Lizard Woman overseers eat human prisoners.

- Mongian firearms that look much more like their terrestrial counterparts than those used in the animated series.

- The clear destruction of the Hawkmen's sky city, whereas in the series it is only captured.

- More revealing costumes, as Flash and Dale Arden's terrestrial clothing gradually disintegrates as well as Zarkov's to a lesser extent upon Mongo. After they are captured by Ming's forces, Dale spends the majority of her time in a belly-dancer-like costume in Ming's harem while Flash does not receive his red and blue uniform until the last 20 minutes of the film.

- Clear reference to killing prior to the final fight between Ming and Flash, as Barin, Vultan and Thun claim their right under the laws of Mongo to trial by combat before they can be put to death.

- The final fight between Ming and Flash involves the use of both pistols and swords by both parties, whereas Flash does not use a pistol and loses his sword rapidly in the animated series.

- Ming's daughter Aura is a much less sympathetic character. The romance between her and Prince Barin is downplayed and, at the end, she refuses to swear allegiance to him as Regent, resulting in him ordering her imprisonment.

- It is made clear at the end that Flash, Dale and Zarkov will never be able to return to Earth, whereas in the animated series that door is left open.
