= Flash Gordon Classic =

- Directed by: Robb Pratt
- Written by: Robb Pratt; Emmet O'Brien
- Based on: Flash Gordon by Alex Raymond
- Produced by: Robb Pratt
- Starring: Eric Johnson; Joe Whyte; G.K. Bowes; John Newton; Jennifer Newton
- Music by: Clifford Vaughan; Heinz Roemheld
- Release date: May 11, 2015
- Running time: 4 minutes
- Language: English

Flash Gordon Classic is a 2015 animated fan film made by Robb Pratt. It is a remake of "The Tunnel of Terror", the second episode of the 1936 Flash Gordon serial.

== Plot ==
Star quarterback Flash Gordon and his girlfriend Dale Arden are kidnapped by scientist Hans Zarkov and forced to join him on an intergalactic voyage to the planet Mongo. There, the trio are quickly captured by the forces of Ming the Merciless. As Ming holds Dale captive, he sends Flash and Zarkov into the Tunnel of Terror, where they must engage in a gladiatorial battle against a giant monster. Flash uses a stone like a football to fend off the monster, but as it has him pinned to the ground with its claw, Princess Aura throws a ray gun, which Flash uses to kill the monster. Ming calmly reprimands his daughter for her actions, but she insists for him to keep Flash alive for her, as she eventually champions him to leading a rebellion against her father’s regime over Mongo.

== Cast ==
- Eric Johnson as Flash Gordon
- Joe Whyte as Hans Zarkov
- G. K. Bowes as Dale Arden
- John Newton as Ming the Merciless
- Jennifer Newton as Princess Aura

== Production ==
In creating Flash Gordon Classic, Robb Pratt drew inspiration from the 1930s Flash Gordon serial starring Buster Crabbe after learning of it as one of the major influences behind Star Wars. Realizing he could not replicate Alex Raymond's elaborate artwork from the comics, Pratt based his designs on 1940s science fiction pulp magazines. Like Pratt's previous works, Superman Classic and Bizarro Classic, Flash Gordon Classic uses hand-drawn animation with digital paint and effects. The soundtrack consists of Clifford Vaughan's score from the Flash Gordon serials and Heinz Roemheld's score from the 1934 film The Black Cat.

Eric Johnson, who played the title character in the 2007 Flash Gordon TV series, loosely reprises his role in this short film. This also marks Pratt's third consecutive collaboration with John Newton and wife Jennifer, who play Ming the Merciless and Princess Aura, respectively.
