= List of Flash Gordon comic strips =

Flash Gordon and Dale Arden meet Ming the Merciless for the first time in the Flash Gordon comic serial "On the Planet Mongo" (1934), art by Alex Raymond.

Flash Gordon is an American space adventure comic strip from King Features Syndicate, created and originally illustrated by Alex Raymond to compete with the already established Buck Rogers adventure strip. Flash Gordon ran as a Sunday comic from January 7, 1934, until March 16, 2003. A daily strip by Austin Briggs ran from 1941 to 1944, and another by Dan Barry ran from 1951 to 1990. From 2003 to 2023, the strip reprinted the work of Jim Keefe, who wrote and illustrated the comic from 1996 to 2003. Flash Gordon was relaunched as a daily strip by Dan Schkade on October 22, 2023.

The comic strip follows the adventures of Flash Gordon and his companions Dale Arden and Dr. Hans Zarkov, who travel to the planet Mongo and immediately come into conflict with Ming the Merciless, its evil ruler. Other characters include Prince Thun of the Lion Men, Flash's ally who opposes Ming; Princess Aura, Ming's selfish daughter who has an unrequited love for Flash; Prince Barin of the forest kingdom of Arboria, the rightful ruler of Mongo; and Prince Vultan of the Hawkmen, who inhabit a flying city.

== Sunday strips ==
Flash Gordon was created and originally illustrated by Alex Raymond to compete with the already established Buck Rogers adventure strip. Flash Gordon ran as a Sunday comic from January 7, 1934 until March 16, 2003. From 2003 to 2023, the strip went into reprints of the work of Jim Keefe, who had written and illustrated the comic from 1996 to 2003.

=== Alex Raymond (1934–1944) ===
No.	Serial title	Artist	Written by	Start date	End date	Ref.
S001	"On the Planet Mongo"	Alex Raymond	Alex Raymond / Don Moore	January 7, 1934	April 8, 1934	
Renowned polo player Flash Gordon and beautiful Dale Arden are abducted by Dr. Hans Zarkov, who is taking a rocket to the mysterious planet Mongo to stop its collision with Earth. The spacecraft crashes outside a sparkling city, and survivors Flash and Dale are taken captive by Ming the Merciless, the Emperor of the Universe. Ming plans to marry Dale, and intends to execute Flash, even though he has defeated Ming's Monkey Men in the gladiatorial arena. Ming's daughter, Princess Aura, has fallen in love with Flash and helps him escape. Flash makes a friend in Prince Thun of the Lion Men, who helps him rescue Dale. Flash and Dale are captured by the Shark Men, who intend to return Dale to Ming. Aura helps Flash to escape again. Thun frees Dale, but they are recaptured.
S002	"Monsters of Mongo"	Alex Raymond	Don Moore	April 15, 1934	November 18, 1934	
Flash and Aura are captured by the rebel Prince Barin. Flash and another captive are blindfolded and forced to fight each other with poisoned knives. Flash discovers that his opponent is Dr. Zarkov, who has overcome his madness. They befriend Barin and join his conspiracy against Ming, while Aura escapes. Flash, Barin and Zarkov are captured by Ming and sentenced to death. Flash defeats multiple monsters, and the men escape with Thun's help. They interrupt Ming's wedding to Dale, and Ming sends Flash, Barin, Dale, Thun and Zarkov to be imprisoned in the floating city of the Hawkmen. Flash rebuffs Aura's advances, and Dale agrees to marry King Vultan of the Hawkmen to save Flash's life. Flash, Barin, Thun and Zarkov are put to work in the Atom Furnace, but cause an explosion and escape. Before Flash can rescue Dale, the damaged city begins to fall. Zarkov invents a better way to keep the city afloat, and Vultan frees them all.
S003	"Tournaments of Mongo"	Alex Raymond	Don Moore	November 25, 1934	February 24, 1935	
S004	"The Caverns of Mongo"	Alex Raymond	Don Moore	March 3, 1935	April 14, 1935	
S005	"Witch Queen of Mongo"	Alex Raymond	Don Moore	April 21, 1935	October 13, 1935	
S006	"At War with Ming"	Alex Raymond	Don Moore	October 20, 1935	April 5, 1936	
S007	"Undersea Kingdom of Mongo"	Alex Raymond	Don Moore	April 12, 1936	October 11, 1936	
S008	"Forest Kingdom of Mongo"	Alex Raymond	Don Moore	October 18, 1936	January 31, 1937	
S009	"Tusk-Men of Mongo"	Alex Raymond	Don Moore	February 7, 1937	April 18, 1937	
S010	"Beast Men of Mongo"	Alex Raymond	Don Moore	April 25, 1937	August 8, 1937	
S011	"Outlaws of Mongo"	Alex Raymond	Don Moore	August 15, 1937	May 29, 1938	
S012	"The Tyrant of Mongo"	Alex Raymond	Don Moore	June 5, 1938	March 5, 1939	
S013	"Ice Kingdom of Mongo"	Alex Raymond	Don Moore	March 12, 1939	April 7, 1940	
S014	"Power Men of Mongo"	Alex Raymond	Don Moore	April 14, 1940	January 12, 1941	
S015	"Fall of Ming"	Alex Raymond	Don Moore	January 19, 1941	June 29, 1941	
S016	"Return to Earth"	Alex Raymond	Don Moore	July 6, 1941	December 28, 1941	
S017	"Queen Desira"	Alex Raymond	Don Moore	January 4, 1942	June 14, 1942	
S018	"Jungles of Mongo"	Alex Raymond	Don Moore	June 21, 1942	November 1, 1942	
S019	"Fiery Desert of Mongo"	Alex Raymond	Don Moore	November 8, 1942	July 11, 1943	
S020	"Battle for Tropica"	Alex Raymond	Don Moore	July 18, 1943	February 6, 1944	
S021	"Triumph in Tropica"	Alex Raymond / Austin Briggs	Don Moore	February 13, 1944	August 13, 1944	

=== Austin Briggs (1944–1948) ===
No.	Serial title	Artist	Written by	Start date	End date	Ref.
S022	"Marvela"	Austin Briggs	Don Moore	August 20, 1944	February 4, 1945	
S023	"Kang the Cruel"	Austin Briggs	Don Moore	February 11, 1945	May 20, 1945	
S024	"The Skymen"	Austin Briggs	Don Moore	May 27, 1945	September 30, 1945	
S025	"The Atomic Age"	Austin Briggs	Don Moore	October 7, 1945	March 17, 1946	
S026	"The Storm Queen of Valkir"	Austin Briggs	Don Moore	March 24, 1946	September 29, 1946	
S027	"Wizard King of the Fur Men"	Austin Briggs	Don Moore	October 6, 1946	January 26, 1947	
S028	"Land of the Bird Queen"	Austin Briggs	Don Moore	February 2, 1947	June 1, 1947	
S029	"Man-Hunt"	Austin Briggs	Don Moore	June 8, 1947	October 12, 1947	
S030	"Dangerous Woman"	Austin Briggs	Don Moore	October 19, 1947	March 7, 1948	
S031	"Lostland"	Austin Briggs	Don Moore	March 14, 1948	July 25, 1948	

=== Mac Raboy (1948–1967) ===
No.	Serial title	Artist	Written by	Start date	End date	Ref.
S032	"The Mystery Moon of Mongo"	Mac Raboy	Don Moore	August 1, 1948	September 19, 1948	TBA
S033	"On the Doom Comet"	Mac Raboy	Don Moore	September 26, 1948	June 12, 1949	TBA
S034	"Merma"	Mac Raboy	Don Moore	June 19, 1949	September 11, 1949	TBA
S035	"Polaria"	Mac Raboy	Don Moore	September 18, 1949	January 1, 1950	TBA
S036	"Tropix"	Mac Raboy	Don Moore	January 8, 1950	March 26, 1950	TBA
S037	"Exila"	Mac Raboy	Don Moore	April 2, 1950	November 5, 1950	TBA
S038	"World Without Metal"	Mac Raboy	Don Moore	November 12, 1950	March 25, 1951	TBA
S039	"Missiles from the Moon"	Mac Raboy	Don Moore	April 1, 1951	June 17, 1951	TBA
S040	"Space Platform"	Mac Raboy	Don Moore	June 24, 1951	October 14, 1951	TBA
S041	"Menta, Queen of Mars"	Mac Raboy	Don Moore	October 21, 1951	February 24, 1952	TBA
S042	"Rhea, Moon of Saturn"	Mac Raboy	Don Moore	March 2, 1952	July 6, 1952	TBA
S043	"Pyron, the Comet Master"	Mac Raboy	Don Moore	July 13, 1952	October 5, 1952	TBA
S044	"Venus"	Mac Raboy	Don Moore	October 12, 1952	February 22, 1953	TBA
S045	"Moon Pirates"	Mac Raboy	Don Moore	March 1, 1953	May 31, 1953	TBA
S046	"Titan"	Mac Raboy	TBA	June 7, 1953	September 13, 1953	TBA
S047	"The Mind"	Mac Raboy	TBA	September 20, 1953	January 17, 1954	TBA
S048	"Thanatos"	Mac Raboy	TBA	January 24, 1954	May 2, 1954	TBA
S049	"Bandit of the Asteroids"	Mac Raboy	TBA	May 9, 1954	July 25, 1954	TBA
S050	"The Star Tree"	Mac Raboy	TBA	August 1, 1954	October 17, 1954	TBA
S051	"Child Men and Giants"	Mac Raboy	TBA	October 24, 1954	January 9, 1955	TBA
S052	"The Altered Past"	Mac Raboy	TBA	January 16, 1955	March 27, 1955	TBA
S053	"The Mistiks of Venus"	Mac Raboy	TBA	April 3, 1955	June 19, 1955	TBA
S054	"Centra"	Mac Raboy	TBA	June 26, 1955	August 28, 1955	TBA
S055	"Dark Planet Prison"	Mac Raboy	TBA	September 4, 1955	November 6, 1955	TBA
S056	"Station Crossroads"	Mac Raboy	TBA	November 13, 1955	January 15, 1956	TBA
S057	"Sharks"	Mac Raboy	TBA	January 22, 1956	March 25, 1956	TBA
S058	"The Radioactive Man"	Mac Raboy	TBA	April 1, 1956	June 3, 1956	TBA
S059	"Axe of Mongo"	Mac Raboy	TBA	June 10, 1956	August 19, 1956	TBA
S060	"Journey South"	Mac Raboy	TBA	August 26, 1956	October 28, 1956	TBA
S061	"Paxora"	Mac Raboy	TBA	November 4, 1956	December 30, 1956	TBA
S062	"Rok"	Mac Raboy	TBA	January 6, 1957	March 10, 1957	TBA
S063	"Race to a Star"	Mac Raboy	TBA	March 17, 1957	May 19, 1957	TBA
S064	"The Gatherer"	Mac Raboy	TBA	May 26, 1957	July 14, 1957	TBA
S065	"The Black Box"	Mac Raboy	TBA	July 21, 1957	September 1, 1957	TBA
S066	"Weird World"	Mac Raboy	TBA	September 8, 1957	November 24, 1957	TBA
S067	"The Lonely Crowd"	Mac Raboy	TBA	December 1, 1957	January 12, 1958	TBA
S068	"Missiles from Neptune"	Mac Raboy	TBA	January 19, 1958	March 9, 1958	TBA
S069	"Robinson Crusoe in Space"	Mac Raboy	TBA	March 16, 1958	April 27, 1958	TBA
S070	"The Z-Bomb Cloud"	Mac Raboy	TBA	May 4, 1958	June 15, 1958	TBA
S071	"Stratosphere Beasts"	Mac Raboy	TBA	June 22, 1958	August 17, 1958	TBA
S072	"Rocket Derby"	Mac Raboy	TBA	August 24, 1958	October 12, 1958	TBA
S073	"Moon Wreck"	Mac Raboy	TBA	October 19, 1958	December 14, 1958	TBA
S074	"The Ship of Gold"	Mac Raboy	TBA	December 21, 1958	February 1, 1959	TBA
S075	"The Skorpi"	Mac Raboy	TBA	February 8, 1959	April 5, 1959	TBA
S076	"Flight for Help"	Mac Raboy	TBA	April 12, 1959	June 7, 1959	TBA
S077	"City of Glass"	Mac Raboy	TBA	June 14, 1959	August 23, 1959	TBA
S078	"Venus Mystery"	Mac Raboy	TBA	August 30, 1959	November 1, 1959	TBA
S079	"Robot Spaceship"	Mac Raboy	TBA	November 8, 1959	January 17, 1960	TBA
S080	"The Star Miners"	Mac Raboy	TBA	January 24, 1960	March 27, 1960	TBA
S081	"Deadly Cargo"	Mac Raboy	TBA	April 3, 1960	June 12, 1960	TBA
S082	"The Soil Divers"	Mac Raboy	TBA	June 19, 1960	August 28, 1960	TBA
S083	"Dead Worlds"	Mac Raboy	TBA	September 4, 1960	November 20, 1960	TBA
S084	"Game Warden on Saturn"	Mac Raboy	TBA	November 27, 1960	February 19, 1961	TBA
S085	"The Trail of Orpheus"	Mac Raboy	TBA	February 26, 1961	May 28, 1961	TBA
S086	"Death Farm in Space"	Mac Raboy	TBA	June 4, 1961	September 3, 1961	TBA
S087	"Desert Prince"	Mac Raboy	TBA	September 10, 1961	December 10, 1961	TBA
S088	"Spaceways Patrol"	Mac Raboy	TBA	December 17, 1961	April 1, 1962	TBA
S089	"Living Fossil"	Mac Raboy	TBA	April 8, 1962	July 15, 1962	TBA
S090	"Falling Moon"	Mac Raboy	TBA	July 22, 1962	October 14, 1962	TBA
S091	"Sons of Saturn"	Mac Raboy	TBA	October 21, 1962	January 20, 1963	TBA
S092	"The Force Dome"	Mac Raboy	TBA	January 27, 1963	April 14, 1963	TBA
S093	"Star Beacon"	Mac Raboy	TBA	April 21, 1963	July 14, 1963	TBA
S094	"Yeti"	Mac Raboy	TBA	July 21, 1963	November 17, 1963	TBA
S095	"Boy From Another World"	Mac Raboy	TBA	November 24, 1963	March 15, 1964	TBA
S096	"Dark Sun of Dragor"	Mac Raboy	TBA	March 22, 1964	July 19, 1964	TBA
S097	"The Chameleon"	Mac Raboy	TBA	July 26, 1964	November 8, 1964	TBA
S098	"Man-Made Weather"	Mac Raboy	TBA	November 15, 1964	February 14, 1965	TBA
S099	"Lost Tribe of the Andes"	Mac Raboy	TBA	February 21, 1965	June 13, 1965	TBA
S100	"The Greatest Art Theft"	Mac Raboy	TBA	June 20, 1965	October 10, 1965	TBA
S101	"Con Man in Space"	Mac Raboy	TBA	October 17, 1965	January 30, 1966	TBA
S102	"A Visit From Mercury"	Mac Raboy	TBA	February 6, 1966	June 5, 1966	TBA
S103	"Death World"	Mac Raboy	TBA	June 12, 1966	October 23, 1966	TBA
S104	"The Duke of Naples"	Mac Raboy	TBA	October 30, 1966	April 2, 1967	TBA
S105	"The Moon Launcher"	Mac Raboy	TBA	April 9, 1967	July 16, 1967	TBA
S106	"Captured on Pluto"	Mac Raboy / Dan Barry	TBA	July 23, 1967	January 7, 1968	

=== Dan Barry (1968–1990) ===
No.	Serial title	Artist	Written by	Start date	End date	Ref.
S107	"The Return of the Chameleon"	Dan Barry	TBA	January 14, 1968	August 11, 1968	
S108	"Colony on Pluto"	Dan Barry	TBA	August 18, 1968	December 29, 1968	
S109	"The Robot World"	Dan Barry	TBA	January 5, 1969	June 8, 1969	
S110	"Invasion!"	Dan Barry	TBA	June 15, 1969	November 9, 1969	
S111	"Assignment on Pluto"	Dan Barry	TBA	November 16, 1969	March 29, 1970	
S112	"The Matter Transmitter"	Dan Barry	TBA	April 5, 1970	July 12, 1970	
S113	"Trouble on Venus"	Dan Barry	TBA	July 19, 1970	October 25, 1970	
S114	"The Cosmic Tower"	Dan Barry	TBA	November 1, 1970	February 7, 1971	
S115	"The Death Planet"	Dan Barry	TBA	February 14, 1971	May 2, 1971	
S116	"Robot War"	Dan Barry	TBA	May 9, 1971	July 18, 1971	
S117	"The Planet Krogius"	Dan Barry	TBA	July 25, 1971	October 24, 1971	TBA
S118	"Radiation Giants"	Dan Barry	TBA	October 31, 1971	December 26, 1971	TBA
S119	"Swamp God of Venus"	Dan Barry	TBA	January 2, 1972	March 26, 1972	TBA
S120	"The Roamer Asteroid Survivor"	Dan Barry	TBA	April 2, 1972	June 25, 1972	TBA
S121	"Progress Comes to Venus"	Dan Barry	TBA	July 2, 1972	September 17, 1972	TBA
S122	"Mercury Station"	Dan Barry	TBA	September 24, 1972	December 3, 1972	TBA
S123	"Alien Women"	Dan Barry	TBA	December 10, 1972	March 4, 1973	TBA
S124	"Astro God"	Dan Barry	TBA	March 11, 1973	May 27, 1973	TBA
S125	"Ric Espada's Son"	Dan Barry	TBA	June 3, 1973	August 19, 1973	TBA
S126	"Ivo"	Dan Barry	TBA	August 26, 1973	November 11, 1973	TBA
S127	"Gudrun and the Gambling Satellite"	Dan Barry	TBA	November 18, 1973	February 3, 1974	TBA
Same storyline run in daily D2-092
S128	"Holograms"	Dan Barry	TBA	February 10, 1974	April 28, 1974	TBA
Same storyline run in daily D2-093
S129	"Solar Energy Station"	Dan Barry	TBA	May 5, 1974	July 14, 1974	TBA
Same storyline run in daily D2-094
S130	"Hideout in the 25th Century"	Dan Barry	TBA	July 21, 1974	September 15, 1974	TBA
Same storyline run in daily D2-095
S131	"Rome"	Dan Barry	TBA	September 22, 1974	November 10, 1974	TBA
Same storyline run in daily D2-096
S132	"Troy"	Dan Barry	TBA	November 17, 1974	February 16, 1975	TBA
Same storyline run in daily D2-097
S133	"Kidnapped"	Dan Barry	TBA	February 23, 1975	June 8, 1975	TBA
S134	"The Doll Master"	Dan Barry	TBA	June 15, 1975	September 14, 1975	TBA
S135	"Undina"	Dan Barry	TBA	September 21, 1975	December 7, 1975	TBA
S136	"Ming!"	Dan Barry	TBA	December 14, 1975	February 29, 1976	TBA
S137	"Pan Reborn"	Dan Barry	TBA	March 7, 1976	May 23, 1976	TBA
S138	"Lifeboat"	Dan Barry	TBA	May 30, 1976	August 15, 1976	TBA
S139	"Martian Ghost Ship"	Dan Barry	TBA	August 22, 1976	November 7, 1976	TBA
S140	"Monster!"	Dan Barry	TBA	November 14, 1976	January 30, 1977	TBA
S141	"Planet of Terror"	Dan Barry	TBA	February 6, 1977	May 8, 1977	TBA
S142	"Geb, the Earth God"	Dan Barry	TBA	May 15, 1977	August 28, 1977	TBA
S143	"The Slave Runners"	Dan Barry	TBA	September 4, 1977	December 4, 1977	TBA
S144	"Skorpi Hunters"	Dan Barry	TBA	December 11, 1977	February 26, 1978	TBA
S145	"The Dark Side of Xalisco!"	Dan Barry	TBA	March 5, 1978	May 21, 1978	TBA
S146	"Crash Landing"	Dan Barry	TBA	May 28, 1978	August 13, 1978	TBA
S147	"Dak-Tula's Revenge"	Dan Barry	TBA	August 20, 1978	November 5, 1978	TBA
S148	"Death Ship"	Dan Barry	TBA	November 12, 1978	March 11, 1979	TBA
S149	"Skorpi vs Baldur"	Dan Barry	TBA	March 18, 1979	June 3, 1979	TBA
S150	"Captain Roper"	Dan Barry	TBA	June 10, 1979	September 9, 1979	TBA
S151	"Power Mad Women"	Dan Barry	TBA	September 16, 1979	December 30, 1979	TBA
S152	"Hostages"	Dan Barry	TBA	January 6, 1980	April 6, 1980	TBA
S153	"Noah Two"	Dan Barry	TBA	April 13, 1980	August 17, 1980	TBA
S154	"Sea Dragons of Venus"	Dan Barry	TBA	August 24, 1980	December 28, 1980	TBA
S155	"Alien Intruder"	Dan Barry	TBA	January 4, 1981	April 12, 1981	TBA
S156	"Homestead on Laredo"	Dan Barry	TBA	April 19, 1981	July 5, 1981	TBA
S157	"Shark Boy of Mongo"	Dan Barry, Bob Fujitani	TBA	July 12, 1981	November 1, 1981	TBA
S158	"Sargasso of Space"	Dan Barry, Bob Fujitani	TBA	November 8, 1981	February 21, 1982	TBA
S159	"Dale on Mongo"	Dan Barry, Bob Fujitani	TBA	February 28, 1982	June 27, 1982	TBA
S160	"Lost Continent of Mongo"	Dan Barry, Bob Fujitani	TBA	July 4, 1982	October 31, 1982	TBA
S161	"Devil's Outpost"	Dan Barry, Bob Fujitani	TBA	November 7, 1982	March 13, 1983	TBA
S162	"Expedition to Kkorbu"	Dan Barry	TBA	March 20, 1983	October 7, 1984	TBA
S163	"The Monster Pit"	Dan Barry	TBA	October 14, 1984	February 17, 1985	TBA
S164	"Return to Kkorbu"	Dan Barry	TBA	February 24, 1985	July 7, 1985	TBA
S165	"Son of Vultan"	Dan Barry	TBA	July 14, 1985	November 3, 1985	TBA
S166	"Horsemen of Madya"	Dan Barry	TBA	November 10, 1985	February 16, 1986	TBA
S167	"The Annihilator"	Dan Barry	TBA	February 23, 1986	July 27, 1986	TBA
S168	"The Origin of Prince Barin"	Dan Barry	TBA	August 3, 1986	December 7, 1986	TBA
S169	"The Hunt"	Dan Barry, Frank Giacoia	TBA	December 14, 1986	May 3, 1987	TBA
S170	"Dimension of the Living Machines"	Dan Barry	TBA	May 10, 1987	October 25, 1987	TBA
S171	"Scavengers of Space"	Dan Barry	TBA	November 1, 1987	March 27, 1988	TBA
S172	"Kkorbu Revisited"	Dan Barry	TBA	April 3, 1988	March 26, 1989	TBA
S173	"The Cosmic Chess Game"	Dan Barry	TBA	April 2, 1989	July 2, 1989	TBA
S174	"The Wolfpack"	Dan Barry	TBA	July 9, 1989	October 29, 1989	TBA
S175	"Death on Kkorbu"	Dan Barry	TBA	November 5, 1989	May 6, 1990	TBA
S176	"The Mind"	Dan Barry	TBA	May 13, 1990	July 15, 1990	TBA
S177R	"Homestead on Laredo"	Dan Barry	TBA	July 22, 1990	October 7, 1990	TBA
Reprint of S156

=== Ralph Reese & Gray Morrow (1990–1991) ===
No.	Serial title	Artist	Written by	Start date	End date	Ref.
S178	"Princess Simila"	Ralph Reese, Gray Morrow	Bruce Jones	October 14, 1990	August 11, 1991	TBA

=== Andrés Klacik (1991–1996) ===
No.	Serial title	Artist	Written by	Start date	End date	Ref.
S179	"The Purple Death"	Andrés Klacik	Thomas Warkentin	August 18, 1991	April 12, 1992	TBA
S180	"Utopia"	Andrés Klacik	Richard Bruning	April 19, 1992	August 30, 1992	TBA
S181	"The Journey"	Andrés Klacik	Richard Bruning	September 6, 1992	December 27, 1992	TBA
S182	"Rygalia"	Andrés Klacik	Kevin VanHook	January 3, 1993	May 9, 1993	TBA
S183	"God Machine"	Andrés Klacik	Kevin VanHook	May 16, 1993	September 12, 1993	TBA
S184	"Under the Sea"	Andrés Klacik	Kevin VanHook	September 19, 1993	January 2, 1994	TBA
S185	"A Matter of Honor"	Andrés Klacik	Thomas Warkentin	January 9, 1994	May 1, 1994	TBA
S186	"Triangle in Eden"	Andrés Klacik	Thomas Warkentin	May 8, 1994	September 4, 1994	TBA
S187	"Edge of Doom"	Andrés Klacik	Thomas Warkentin	September 11, 1994	June 18, 1995	TBA
S188	"Ming's Circus"	Andrés Klacik	Thomas Warkentin	June 25, 1995	January 14, 1996	TBA

=== Jim Keefe (1996–2003) ===
No.	Serial title	Artist	Written by	Start date	End date	Ref.
S189	"Demon from the Dark Dimension"	Jim Keefe	Jim Keefe	January 21, 1996	April 21, 1996	
S190	"Nightfall on Mongo"	Jim Keefe, Mark McMurray, Brian Bilter	Jim Keefe	April 28, 1996	August 25, 1996	
S191	"The Way It Began"	Jim Keefe	Jim Keefe	September 1, 1996	September 29, 1996	
S192	"The Return of Ming"	Jim Keefe, Mark McMurray, Brian Bilter	Jim Keefe	October 6, 1996	December 22, 1996	
S193	"Durok's Revenge"	Jim Keefe	Jim Keefe	December 29, 1996	May 11, 1997	
S194	"Lair of the Damned"	Jim Keefe	Jim Keefe	May 18, 1997	July 13, 1997	
S195	"Wartog"	Jim Keefe	Jim Keefe	July 20, 1997	October 12, 1997	
S196	"Alania Under Siege"	Jim Keefe	Jim Keefe	October 19, 1997	May 3, 1998	
S197	"Traitor in Our Midst"	Jim Keefe	Jim Keefe	May 10, 1998	October 18, 1998	
S198	"The Way It Began [Re-Edit]"	Jim Keefe	Jim Keefe	October 25, 1998	November 1, 1998	
Partial reprint and re-edit of S191
S199	"Shadowland"	Jim Keefe	Jim Keefe	November 8, 1998	January 3, 1999	
S200	"Return to Syk"	Jim Keefe, Mark McMurray, Brian Bilter	Jim Keefe	January 10, 1999	March 28, 1999	
S201	"Back to Earth"	Jim Keefe	Jim Keefe	April 4, 1999	October 31, 1999	
In subsequent reprints of this serial, a panel featuring US President Bill Clinton from July 25, 1999, was edited to feature President Barack Obama in a December 4, 2011, reprint, and then edited to include President Donald Trump in a January 6, 2019 reprint.
S202	"Garden of Evil"	Jim Keefe, Al Williamson	Jim Keefe	November 7, 1999	December 19, 1999	
S203	"Artist Gallery"	Alex Raymond, Austin Briggs, Mac Raboy, Dan Barry, Al Williamson, Gray Morrow, Jim Keefe	Jim Keefe	December 26, 1999	December 26, 1999	
S204R	"The Way It Began [Re-Edit]"	Jim Keefe	Jim Keefe	January 2, 2000	January 9, 2000	
Reprint of S198
S205	"To Melt a Queen's Heart"	Jim Keefe	Jim Keefe	January 16, 2000	June 18, 2000	
S206	"Operation: Escape"	Jim Keefe	Jim Keefe	June 25, 2000	August 6, 2000	
S207	"Peace Offering"	Jim Keefe, Brian Bilter	Jim Keefe	August 13, 2000	November 5, 2000	
S208	"Secret Agent X-9"	Jim Keefe, Mark McMurray, George Evans, Brian Bilter	Jim Keefe	November 12, 2000	June 17, 2001	
S209	"Nesting Ground"	Jim Keefe, Mark McMurray, Al Williamson, Loston Wallace	Jim Keefe	June 24, 2001	August 12, 2001	
S210	"Flashback"	Jim Keefe	Jim Keefe	August 19, 2001	October 28, 2001	
Partial reprint of S191 with new art
S211	"Slithers"	Jim Keefe, Mark McMurray, Brian Bilter	Jim Keefe	November 4, 2001	May 12, 2002	
S212	"Crowning Glory"	Jim Keefe	Jim Keefe	May 19, 2002	August 18, 2002	
S213	"Hatchlings"	Jim Keefe, Michael T. Gilbert	Jim Keefe	August 25, 2002	September 22, 2002	
S214	"Tournament of Death"	Jim Keefe, Mark McMurray, Joe Kubert, John Romita Sr	Jim Keefe	September 29, 2002	March 16, 2003	

=== Reprint era (2003–2023) ===
No.	Serial title	Artist	Written by	Start date	End date	Ref.
S215R	"The Way It Began [Re-Edit]"	Jim Keefe	Jim Keefe	March 23, 2003	March 30, 2003	
Reprint of S198
S216R	"Wartog"	Jim Keefe	Jim Keefe	April 6, 2003	June 29, 2003	
Reprint of S195
S217R	"Demon From the Dark Dimension"	Jim Keefe	Jim Keefe	July 6, 2003	September 28, 2003	
Partial reprint of S189 [missing 1/21/96 strip]
S218R	"Traitor in Our Midst"	Jim Keefe	Jim Keefe	October 5, 2003	March 14, 2004	
Reprint of S197
S219R	"The Way It Began [Re-Edit]"	Jim Keefe	Jim Keefe	March 21, 2004	March 28, 2004	
Reprint of S198
S220R	"Return to Syk"	Jim Keefe	Jim Keefe	April 4, 2004	June 20, 2004	
Reprint of S200
S221R	"Back to Earth"	Jim Keefe	Jim Keefe	June 27, 2004	January 23, 2005	
Reprint of S201.
S222R	"Garden of Evil"	Jim Keefe	Jim Keefe	January 30, 2005	March 13, 2005	
Reprint of S202
S223R	"The Way It Began [Re-Edit]"	Jim Keefe	Jim Keefe	March 20, 2005	March 27, 2005	
Reprint of S198
S224R	"To Melt a Queen's Heart"	Jim Keefe	Jim Keefe	April 3, 2005	September 4, 2005	
Reprint of S205
S225R	"Operation: Escape"	Jim Keefe	Jim Keefe	September 11, 2005	October 23, 2005	
Reprint of S206
S226R	"Peace Offering"	Jim Keefe	Jim Keefe	October 30, 2005	January 22, 2006	
Reprint of S207
S227R	"Secret Agent X-9"	Jim Keefe	Jim Keefe	January 29, 2006	September 3, 2006	
Reprint of S208
S228R	"Nesting Ground"	Jim Keefe	Jim Keefe	September 10, 2006	October 29, 2006	
Reprint of S209
S229R	"Flashback"	Jim Keefe	Jim Keefe	November 5, 2006	January 14, 2007	
Reprint of S210
S230R	"Slithers"	Jim Keefe	Jim Keefe	January 21, 2007	July 29, 2007	
Reprint of S211
S231R	"Crowning Glory"	Jim Keefe	Jim Keefe	August 5, 2007	November 4, 2007	
Reprint of S212
S232R	"Hatchlings"	Jim Keefe	Jim Keefe	November 11, 2007	December 9, 2007	
Reprint of S213
S233R	"Tournament of Death"	Jim Keefe	Jim Keefe	December 16, 2007	June 1, 2008	
Reprint of S214
S234R	"Demon from the Dark Dimension"	Jim Keefe	Jim Keefe	June 8, 2008	August 31, 2008	
Partial reprint of S189 [missing 1/21/96 strip]
S235R	"Nightfall on Mongo"	Jim Keefe	Jim Keefe	September 7, 2008	January 4, 2009	
Reprint of S190
S236R	"The Way It Began"	Jim Keefe	Jim Keefe	January 11, 2009	February 8, 2009	
Reprint of S191
S237R	"The Return of Ming"	Jim Keefe	Jim Keefe	February 15, 2009	May 3, 2009	
Reprint of S192
S238R	"Durok's Revenge"	Jim Keefe	Jim Keefe	May 10, 2009	September 20, 2009	
Reprint of S193
S239R	"Lair of the Damned"	Jim Keefe	Jim Keefe	September 27, 2009	November 22, 2009	
Reprint of S194
S240R	"Wartog"	Jim Keefe	Jim Keefe	November 29, 2009	February 21, 2010	
Reprint of S195
S241R	"Alania Under Siege"	Jim Keefe	Jim Keefe	February 28, 2010	September 12, 2010	
Reprint of S196
S242R	"Traitor in Our Midst"	Jim Keefe	Jim Keefe	September 19, 2010	February 27, 2011	
Reprint of S197
S243R	"The Way it Began [Re-Edit]"	Jim Keefe	Jim Keefe	March 6, 2011	March 13, 2011	
Reprint of S198
S244R	"Shadowland"	Jim Keefe	Jim Keefe	March 20, 2011	May 15, 2011	
Reprint of S199
S245R	"Return To Syk"	Jim Keefe	Jim Keefe	May 22, 2011	August 7, 2011	
Reprint of S200
S246R	"Back to Earth"	Jim Keefe	Jim Keefe	August 14, 2011	March 11, 2012	
Reprint of S201. In reprints of this serial, a panel featuring US President Bill Clinton from July 25, 1999, was edited to feature President Barack Obama in the December 4, 2011, reprint, and then edited to include President Donald Trump in the January 6, 2019 reprint.
S247R	"Garden of Evil"	Jim Keefe	Jim Keefe	March 18, 2012	April 29, 2012	
Reprint of S202
S248R	"To Melt a Queen's Heart"	Jim Keefe	Jim Keefe	May 6, 2012	October 7, 2012	
Reprint of S205
S249R	"Operation Escape"	Jim Keefe	Jim Keefe	October 14, 2012	November 25, 2012	
Reprint of S206
S250R	"Peace Offering"	Jim Keefe	Jim Keefe	December 2, 2012	February 24, 2013	
Reprint of S207
S251R	"Secret Agent X-9"	Jim Keefe	Jim Keefe	March 3, 2013	October 6, 2013	
Reprint of S208
S252R	"Nesting Ground"	Jim Keefe	Jim Keefe	October 13, 2013	December 1, 2013	
Reprint of S209
S253R	"Flashback"	Jim Keefe	Jim Keefe	December 8, 2013	February 16, 2014	
Reprint of S210
S254R	"Slithers"	Jim Keefe	Jim Keefe	February 23, 2014	August 31, 2014	
Reprint of S211
S255R	"Crowning Glory"	Jim Keefe	Jim Keefe	September 7, 2014	December 7, 2014	
Reprint of S212
S256R	"Hatchlings"	Jim Keefe	Jim Keefe	December 14, 2014	January 11, 2015	
Reprint of S213
S257R	"Tournament of Death"	Jim Keefe	Jim Keefe	January 18, 2015	July 5, 2015	
Reprint of S214
S258R	"Demon from the Dark Dimension"	Jim Keefe	Jim Keefe	July 12, 2015	October 4, 2016	
Partial reprint of S189 [missing 1/21/96 strip]
S259R	"Nightfall on Mongo"	Jim Keefe	Jim Keefe	October 11, 2015	February 7, 2016	
Reprint of S190
S260R	"The Way it Began"	Jim Keefe	Jim Keefe	February 14, 2016	March 13, 2016	
Reprint of S191
S261R	"The Return of Ming"	Jim Keefe	Jim Keefe	March 20, 2016	June 5, 2016	
Reprint of S192
S262R	"Durok's Revenge"	Jim Keefe	Jim Keefe	June 12, 2016	October 23, 2016	
Reprint of S193
S263R	"Lair of the Damned"	Jim Keefe	Jim Keefe	October 30, 2016	December 25, 2016	
Reprint of S194
S264R	"Wartog"	Jim Keefe	Jim Keefe	January 1, 2017	March 16, 2017	
Reprint of S195
S265R	"Alania Under Siege"	Jim Keefe	Jim Keefe	April 2, 2017	October 15, 2017	
Reprint of S196
S266R	"Traitor in Our Midst"	Jim Keefe	Jim Keefe	October 22, 2017	April 1, 2018	
Reprint of S197
S267R	"The Way it Began [Re-Edit]"	Jim Keefe	Jim Keefe	April 8, 2018	April 15, 2018	
Reprint of S198
S268R	"Shadowland"	Jim Keefe	Jim Keefe	April 25, 2018	June 17, 2018	
Reprint of S199
S269R	"Return to Syk"	Jim Keefe	Jim Keefe	June 24, 2018	September 9, 2018	
Reprint of S200
S270R	"Back to Earth"	Jim Keefe	Jim Keefe	September 16, 2018	April 14, 2019	
Reprint of S201. In reprints of this serial, a panel featuring US President Bill Clinton from July 25, 1999, was edited to feature President Barack Obama in the December 4, 2011, reprint, and then edited to include President Donald Trump in the January 6, 2019 reprint.
S271R	"Garden of Evil"	Jim Keefe	Jim Keefe	April 21, 2019	June 2, 2019	TBA
Reprint of S202
S272R	"To Melt a Queen's Heart"	Jim Keefe	Jim Keefe	June 9, 2019	November 10, 2019	TBA
Reprint of S205
S273R	"Operation: Escape"	Jim Keefe	Jim Keefe	November 17, 2019	December 29, 2019	TBA
Reprint of S206
S274R	"Peace Offering"	Jim Keefe	Jim Keefe	January 5, 2020	March 29, 2020	TBA
Reprint of S207
S275R	"Secret Agent X-9"	Jim Keefe	Jim Keefe	April 5, 2020	November 8, 2020	TBA
Reprint of S208
S276R	"Nesting Ground"	Jim Keefe	Jim Keefe	November 15, 2020	January 3, 2021	TBA
Reprint of S209
S277R	"Flashback"	Jim Keefe	Jim Keefe	January 10, 2021	March 21, 2021	TBA
Reprint of S210
S278R	"Slithers"	Jim Keefe	Jim Keefe	March 28, 2021	October 3, 2021	TBA
Reprint of S211
S279R	"Crowning Glory"	Jim Keefe	Jim Keefe	October 10, 2021	January 9, 2022	TBA
Reprint of S212
S280R	"Hatchlings"	Jim Keefe	Jim Keefe	January 16, 2022	February 13, 2022	TBA
Reprint of S213
S281R	"Tournament of Death"	Jim Keefe	Jim Keefe	February 20, 2022	August 7, 2022	TBA
Reprint of S214
S282R	"Demon from the Dark Dimension"	Jim Keefe	Jim Keefe	August 14, 2022	November 6, 2022	TBA
Partial reprint of S189 [missing 1/21/96 strip]
S283R	"Nightfall on Mongo"	Jim Keefe	Jim Keefe	November 13, 2022	March 12, 2023	TBA
Reprint of S190
S284R	"The Way it Began"	Jim Keefe	Jim Keefe	March 19, 2023	April 16, 2023	TBA
Reprint of S191
S285R	"The Return of Ming"	Jim Keefe	Jim Keefe	April 23, 2023	July 9, 2023	TBA
Reprint of S192
S286R	"Durok's Revenge"	Jim Keefe	Jim Keefe	July 16, 2023	October 15, 2023	TBA
Partial reprint of S193 [missing last 6 strips]

== Daily strips ==
A daily strip by Austin Briggs ran from 1941 to 1944, and another by Dan Barry ran from 1951 to 1990. Barry was initially assisted by artist Harvey Kurtzman, and later by Al Williamson, Frank Frazetta, Fred Kida, Bob Fujitani, and Harry Harrison. After Barry's departure in 1990, the strip continued with Bruce Jones as the writer and Ralph Reese as the artist, later assisted by artist Gray Morrow. In 1991, the strip was written by Kevin VanHook and Thomas Warkentin on an alternating basis, with a Buenos Aires-based studio providing the art. The strip ended on July 3, 1993. The following are the serials for the Flash Gordon daily strip from 1941 to 1993.

=== Series 1 ===
No.	Serial title	Artist	Written by	Start date	End date	Ref.
D1–001	"Princess Lita"	Austin Briggs	TBA	May 27, 1940	February 22, 1941	
D1–002	"Freeland"	Austin Briggs	TBA	February 24, 1941	August 21, 1941	
D1–003	"War on Earth"	Austin Briggs	TBA	August 22, 1941	December 13, 1941	
D1–004	"Disaster in Space"	Austin Briggs	TBA	December 15, 1941	January 17, 1942	
D1–005	"Shipwrecked"	Austin Briggs	TBA	January 19, 1942	April 25, 1942	
D1–006	"Radium Mines of Electra"	Austin Briggs	TBA	April 27, 1942	July 11, 1942	
D1–007	"Queen Tigra of Forestia"	Austin Briggs	TBA	July 13, 1942	November 26, 1942	
D1–008	"Royal Hunt"	Austin Briggs	TBA	November 27, 1942	April 21, 1943	
D1–009	"Isle of the Elvins"	Austin Briggs	TBA	April 22, 1943	March 25, 1944	
D1–010	"The Menace of Mysta"	Austin Briggs	TBA	March 27, 1944	April 25, 1944	
D1–011	"Home"	Austin Briggs	TBA	April 26, 1944	June 3, 1944	

=== Series 2 ===
No.	Serial title	Artist	Written by	Start date	End date	Ref.
D2–001	"Space Prison"	Dan Barry	Dan Barry	November 19, 1951	February 16, 1952	TBA
D2–002	"The City of Ice"	Dan Barry	Dan Barry	February 18, 1952	June 14, 1952	TBA
D2–003	"The Butterfly Men"	Dan Barry	Dan Barry	June 16, 1952	August 9, 1952	TBA
D2–004	"Tartarus"	Dan Barry	Dan Barry	August 11, 1952	October 18, 1952	TBA
D2–005	"The Awful Forest"	Dan Barry	Dan Barry	October 20, 1952	December 30, 1952	TBA
D2–006	"Mr. Murlin"	Dan Barry	Dan Barry	December 31, 1952	April 20, 1953	TBA
D2–007	"The Space Kids on Zoran"	Dan Barry	Dan Barry	April 21, 1953	October 24, 1953	TBA
D2–008	"The Lost Continent"	Dan Barry	Dan Barry	October 26, 1953	March 20, 1954	TBA
D2–009	"Circea"	Dan Barry	Dan Barry	March 22, 1954	May 29, 1954	TBA
D2–010	"The Deadly Touch"	Dan Barry	Dan Barry	May 31, 1954	August 30, 1954	TBA
D2–011	"Peril Park"	Dan Barry	Dan Barry	August 31, 1954	November 13, 1954	TBA
D2–012	"The Martian Baby"	Dan Barry	Dan Barry	November 15, 1954	February 5, 1955	TBA
D2–013	"The Trail of the Vulke"	Dan Barry	Dan Barry	February 7, 1955	April 26, 1955	TBA
D2–014	"Tympani"	Dan Barry	Dan Barry	April 27, 1955	July 9, 1955	TBA
D2–015	"Starling"	Dan Barry	Dan Barry	July 11, 1955	September 3, 1955	TBA
D2–016	"Space Circus"	Dan Barry	Dan Barry	September 5, 1955	October 29, 1955	TBA
D2–017	"The Swamp-Girl"	Dan Barry	Dan Barry	October 31, 1955	December 31, 1955	TBA
D2–018	"Return to Mongo"	Dan Barry	Dan Barry	January 2, 1956	March 24, 1956	TBA
D2–019	"Kag the Conqueror"	Dan Barry	Dan Barry	March 26, 1956	June 9, 1956	TBA
D2–020	"Kozy and Skurvy's E-Z Island"	Dan Barry	Dan Barry	June 11, 1956	September 29, 1956	TBA
D2–021	"Robb and Bey's Wonders of Mongo"	Dan Barry	Dan Barry	October 1, 1956	December 25, 1956	TBA
D2–022	"Mezmo"	Dan Barry	Dan Barry	December 26, 1956	February 23, 1957	TBA
D2–023	"Dust Devil"	Dan Barry	Dan Barry	February 25, 1957	April 20, 1957	TBA
D2–024	"City of Azcar Women"	Dan Barry	Dan Barry	April 22, 1957	June 29, 1957	TBA
D2–025	"River Pirates"	Dan Barry	Dan Barry	July 1, 1957	August 17, 1957	TBA
D2–026	"Cybernia"	Dan Barry	Dan Barry	August 19, 1957	October 19, 1957	TBA
D2–027	"Radioactive Loot"	Dan Barry	Dan Barry	October 21, 1957	December 7, 1957	TBA
D2–028	"The Time Pendulum"	Dan Barry	Dan Barry	December 9, 1957	January 25, 1958	TBA
D2–029	"The Far Side of the Moon"	Dan Barry	Dan Barry	January 27, 1958	March 15, 1958	TBA
D2–030	"Behind the Flying Saucers"	Dan Barry	Dan Barry	March 17, 1958	May 3, 1958	TBA
D2–031	"Movie-Making on Pluto"	Dan Barry	Dan Barry	May 5, 1958	June 21, 1958	TBA
D2–032	"Solar Mirror"	Dan Barry	Dan Barry	June 23, 1958	July 26, 1958	TBA
D2–033	"Colony on Mars"	Dan Barry	Dan Barry	July 28, 1958	September 13, 1958	TBA
D2–034	"Disaster at Bigtree"	Dan Barry	Dan Barry	September 15, 1958	November 8, 1958	TBA
D2–035	"Derelict of the Skorpi War"	Dan Barry	Dan Barry	November 10, 1958	December 27, 1958	TBA
D2–036	"Runaway Weather Satellite"	Dan Barry	Dan Barry	December 29, 1958	February 14, 1959	TBA
D2–037	"Lost Legion"	Dan Barry	Dan Barry	February 16, 1959	May 2, 1959	TBA
D2–038	"The Matter Transmitter"	Dan Barry	TBA	May 4, 1959	June 27, 1959	TBA
D2–039	"Flash Without Dale"	Dan Barry	TBA	June 29, 1959	September 5, 1959	TBA
D2–040	"Space Construction Corps"	Dan Barry	TBA	September 7, 1959	October 24, 1959	TBA
D2–041	"H-Bomb Under the Mongo Sea"	Dan Barry	TBA	October 26, 1959	January 5, 1960	TBA
D2–042	"The Metallic Raiders"	Dan Barry	TBA	January 6, 1960	March 5, 1960	TBA
D2–043	"The Airborne Ark"	Dan Barry	TBA	March 7, 1960	April 23, 1960	TBA
D2–044	"The First Man on Mars"	Dan Barry	TBA	April 25, 1960	June 25, 1960	TBA
D2–045	"Quarantine Station"	Dan Barry	TBA	June 27, 1960	September 3, 1960	TBA
D2–046	"The Psi People"	Dan Barry	TBA	September 5, 1960	December 9, 1960	TBA
D2–047	"Deathfighters"	Dan Barry	TBA	December 10, 1960	March 11, 1961	TBA
D2–048	"Waldo Without Spacesuit"	Dan Barry	TBA	March 13, 1961	May 27, 1961	TBA
D2–049	"The Ambassadors"	Dan Barry	TBA	May 29, 1961	July 8, 1961	TBA
D2–050	"Titanic II"	Dan Barry	TBA	July 10, 1961	October 7, 1961	TBA
D2–051	"Horseparlor in the Sky"	Dan Barry	TBA	October 9, 1961	December 23, 1961	TBA
D2–052	"Robot Worker"	Dan Barry	TBA	December 25, 1961	March 17, 1962	TBA
D2–053	"Back in Time"	Dan Barry	TBA	March 19, 1962	May 5, 1962	TBA
D2–054	"Dolphins of Venus"	Dan Barry	TBA	May 7, 1962	July 28, 1962	TBA
D2–055	"Dimension X"	Dan Barry	TBA	July 30, 1962	September 15, 1962	TBA
D2–056	"Space Scouts and Skorpi"	Dan Barry	TBA	September 17, 1962	March 2, 1963	TBA
D2–057	"Death-Stone"	Dan Barry	TBA	March 4, 1963	May 25, 1963	TBA
D2–058	"The Hapless Alien"	Dan Barry	TBA	May 27, 1963	November 9, 1963	TBA
D2–059	"Martian Treasure"	Dan Barry	TBA	November 11, 1963	February 22, 1964	TBA
D2–060	"Solid-Gold Bomb"	Dan Barry	TBA	February 24, 1964	June 13, 1964	TBA
D2–061	"Space Race"	Dan Barry	TBA	June 15, 1964	October 10, 1964	TBA
D2–062	"Shipbuilding on Mars"	Dan Barry	TBA	October 12, 1964	January 16, 1965	TBA
D2–063	"The Robot War"	Dan Barry	TBA	January 18, 1965	April 28, 1965	TBA
D2–064	"The Maybe Machine"	Dan Barry	TBA	April 29, 1965	August 21, 1965	TBA
D2–065	"Space-Sweep"	Dan Barry	TBA	August 23, 1965	December 18, 1965	TBA
D2–066	"The Asteroid Miners"	Dan Barry	TBA	December 20, 1965	April 7, 1966	TBA
D2–067	"Ming IV"	Dan Barry	TBA	April 8, 1966	September 27, 1966	TBA
D2–068	"Food Ship"	Dan Barry	TBA	September 28, 1966	February 11, 1967	TBA
D2–069	"Radioactive Seas"	Dan Barry	TBA	February 13, 1967	July 12, 1967	TBA
D2–070	"Survival Test"	Dan Barry	TBA	July 13, 1967	January 13, 1968	TBA
D2–071	"Egon Blant Escapes"	Dan Barry	TBA	January 15, 1968	May 18, 1968	TBA
D2–072	"Living Statues"	Dan Barry	TBA	May 20, 1968	October 5, 1968	TBA
D2–073	"Flash Gordon and the Vikings"	Dan Barry	TBA	October 7, 1968	February 21, 1969	TBA
D2–074	"McFry's Vendetta"	Dan Barry	TBA	February 22, 1969	August 9, 1969	TBA
D2–075	"Manhunt"	Dan Barry	TBA	August 11, 1969	November 8, 1969	TBA
D2–076	"Flash Gordon vs. the Puppet Master"	Dan Barry	TBA	November 10, 1969	February 28, 1970	TBA
D2–077	"Tournaments of Free Mongo"	Dan Barry	TBA	March 2, 1970	June 17, 1970	TBA
D2–078	"Desert Tribes of Mongo"	Dan Barry	TBA	June 18, 1970	September 5, 1970	TBA
D2–079	"Pirates of Mongo"	Dan Barry	TBA	September 7, 1970	January 16, 1971	TBA
D2–080	"Dinosaur Valley of Mongo"	Dan Barry	TBA	January 18, 1971	April 24, 1971	TBA
D2–081	"Neptunia and Frigia"	Dan Barry	TBA	April 26, 1971	September 4, 1971	TBA
D2–082	"An Alien Stowaway"	Dan Barry	TBA	September 6, 1971	November 20, 1971	TBA
D2–083	"Convict Squad on Rog"	Dan Barry	TBA	November 22, 1971	February 5, 1972	TBA
D2–084	"Convict Squad and the Skraggs"	Dan Barry	TBA	February 7, 1972	April 1, 1972	TBA
D2–085	"Convict Squad and the Drug Trade"	Dan Barry	TBA	April 3, 1972	May 20, 1972	TBA
D2–086	"Operation Medusa"	Dan Barry	TBA	May 22, 1972	July 29, 1972	TBA
D2–087	"Kenoma and the Space-Jacker"	Dan Barry	TBA	July 31, 1972	October 28, 1972	TBA
D2–088	"Willy and the Martians"	Dan Barry	TBA	October 30, 1972	January 13, 1973	TBA
D2–089	"Jack Hammer"	Dan Barry	TBA	January 15, 1973	April 7, 1973	TBA
D2–090	"Dale's Mission"	Dan Barry	TBA	April 9, 1973	July 14, 1973	TBA
D2–091	"Twice in Time"	Dan Barry	TBA	July 16, 1973	November 24, 1973	TBA
D2–092	"Gudrun and the Gambling Satellite"	Dan Barry	TBA	November 26, 1973	February 8, 1974	TBA
Same storyline run in Sunday S127
D2–093	"Holograms"	Dan Barry	TBA	February 10, 1974	April 30, 1974	TBA
Same storyline run in Sunday S128
D2–094	"Solar Energy Station"	Dan Barry	TBA	May 1, 1974	July 13, 1974	TBA
Same storyline run in Sunday S129
D2–095	"Hideout in the 25th Century"	Dan Barry	TBA	July 15, 1974	September 18, 1974	TBA
Same storyline run in Sunday S130
D2–096	"Rome"	Dan Barry	TBA	September 19, 1974	November 16, 1974	TBA
Same storyline run in Sunday S131
D2–097	"Troy"	Dan Barry	TBA	November 18, 1974	February 19, 1975	TBA
Same storyline run in Sunday S132
D2–098	"The Making of a Legend"	Dan Barry	TBA	February 20, 1975	September 6, 1975	TBA
D2–099	"Nomads of Mongo"	Dan Barry	TBA	September 8, 1975	November 29, 1975	TBA
D2–100	"Amazons of Mongo"	Dan Barry	TBA	December 1, 1975	February 21, 1976	TBA
D2–101	"Kozy & Skurvey and the Desert Raiders"	Dan Barry	TBA	February 23, 1976	May 15, 1976	TBA
D2–102	"War Robots"	Dan Barry	TBA	May 17, 1976	August 7, 1976	TBA
D2–103	"Rebels on Venus"	Dan Barry	TBA	August 9, 1976	October 30, 1976	TBA
D2–104	"North Star Invaders"	Dan Barry	TBA	November 1, 1976	January 22, 1977	TBA
D2–105	"Planet of the Klet"	Dan Barry, Bob Fujitani	TBA	January 24, 1977	May 7, 1977	TBA
D2–106	"Atlantis"	Dan Barry, Bob Fujitani	TBA	May 9, 1977	September 1, 1977	TBA
D2–107	"Space School"	Dan Barry, Bob Fujitani	TBA	September 2, 1977	December 17, 1977	TBA
D2–108	"Skorpi on Mongo"	Dan Barry, Bob Fujitani	TBA	December 19, 1977	February 18, 1978	TBA
D2–109	"Ming Supreme"	Dan Barry, Bob Fujitani	TBA	February 20, 1978	June 10, 1978	TBA
D2–110	"Death"	Dan Barry, Bob Fujitani	TBA	June 12, 1978	August 12, 1978	TBA
D2–111	"Slaves"	Dan Barry, Bob Fujitani	TBA	August 14, 1978	November 18, 1978	TBA
D2–112	"Odyssey"	Dan Barry, Bob Fujitani	TBA	November 20, 1978	February 24, 1979	TBA
D2–113	"Ming's Women"	Dan Barry, Bob Fujitani	TBA	February 26, 1979	June 16, 1979	TBA
D2–114	"Black Out"	Dan Barry, Bob Fujitani	TBA	June 18, 1979	August 18, 1979	TBA
D2–115	"Ming's Children"	Dan Barry, Bob Fujitani	TBA	August 20, 1979	December 22, 1979	TBA
D2–116	"Shark Boy"	Dan Barry, Bob Fujitani	TBA	December 24, 1979	April 14, 1980	TBA
D2–117	"The Biggest Living Thing in the Universe"	Dan Barry, Bob Fujitani	TBA	April 15, 1980	August 9, 1980	TBA
D2–118	"Mind Trip"	Dan Barry, Bob Fujitani	TBA	August 11, 1980	October 18, 1980	TBA
D2–119	"Skorpi in Atlantis"	Dan Barry, Bob Fujitani	TBA	October 20, 1980	January 21, 1981	TBA
D2–120	"Prince Alan"	Dan Barry, Bob Fujitani	TBA	January 22, 1981	November 14, 1981	TBA
D2–121	"Captain Jodeen"	Dan Barry, Bob Fujitani	TBA	November 16, 1981	February 20, 1982	TBA
D2–122	"Knight of Mongo"	Dan Barry, Bob Fujitani	TBA	February 22, 1982	June 26, 1982	TBA
D2–123	"The Lure of the Xerees"	Dan Barry, Bob Fujitani	TBA	June 28, 1982	September 18, 1982	TBA
D2–124	"The Living Death of Ming the Merciless"	Dan Barry, Bob Fujitani	TBA	September 20, 1982	January 22, 1983	TBA
D2–125	"The Witch Queen's Magic"	Dan Barry, Bob Fujitani	TBA	January 24, 1983	May 7, 1983	TBA
D2–126	"The Treasure Hunt"	Dan Barry, Bob Fujitani	TBA	May 9, 1983	December 6, 1983	TBA
D2–127	"Rebellion in Frigia"	Dan Barry, Bob Fujitani	TBA	December 7, 1983	May 26, 1984	TBA
D2–128	"EMP"	Dan Barry, Bob Fujitani	TBA	May 28, 1984	September 29, 1984	TBA
D2–129	"Return to Atlantis"	Dan Barry, Bob Fujitani	TBA	October 1, 1984	January 26, 1985	TBA
D2–130	"The Mystic Isles of Mongo"	Dan Barry, Bob Fujitani	TBA	January 28, 1985	August 17, 1985	TBA
D2–131	"Gorilla Men of Mongo"	Dan Barry, Bob Fujitani	TBA	August 19, 1985	October 12, 1985	TBA
D2–132	"The Dark Seed"	Dan Barry, Bob Fujitani	TBA	October 14, 1985	February 22, 1986	TBA
D2–133	"Baldur Battles Skorpi"	Dan Barry, Bob Fujitani	TBA	February 24, 1986	May 10, 1986	TBA
D2–134	"The Bear"	Dan Barry, Andre LeBlanc, Frank Giacoia	TBA	May 12, 1986	August 21, 1986	TBA
D2–135	"Time Warp (The Origin of Flash Gordon Part 1)"	Dan Barry, Frank Giacoia, Dell Barras	TBA	August 22, 1986	June 6, 1987	TBA
D2–136	"The Cave World of Mongo (Origin Part 2)"	Dan Barry	TBA	June 8, 1987	August 15, 1987	TBA
D2–137	"The Ice Kingdom of Mongo (Origin Part 3)"	Dan Barry	TBA	August 17, 1987	December 26, 1987	TBA
D2–138	"The Water World of Mongo (Origin Part 4)"	Dan Barry	TBA	December 28, 1987	May 14, 1988	TBA
D2–139	"Forest Primeval (Origin Part 5)"	Dan Barry	TBA	May 16, 1988	October 1, 1988	TBA
D2–140	"Egon on Mongo"	Dan Barry	TBA	October 3, 1988	March 11, 1989	TBA
D2–141	"Dinosaurs!"	Dan Barry	TBA	March 13, 1989	May 26, 1989	TBA
D2–142	"Hari Hari"	Dan Barry	TBA	May 27, 1989	August 22, 1989	TBA
D2–143	"The High Ground"	Dan Barry	TBA	August 23, 1989	December 14, 1989	TBA
D2–144	"Mission to Mongo"	Dan Barry	TBA	December 15, 1989	February 10, 1990	TBA
D2–145	"In Search of Ming"	Dan Barry	TBA	February 12, 1990	July 14, 1990	TBA
D2–146R	"Skorpi in Atlantis"	Dan Barry	TBA	July 16, 1990	October 6, 1990	TBA
Partial reprint of D2-119
D2–147	"Tournament of Frigia"	Ralph Reese	Bruce Jones	October 8, 1990	January 5, 1991	TBA
D2–148	"Roughing It"	Ralph Reese, Gray Morrow	Bruce Jones	January 7, 1991	August 10, 1991	TBA
D2–149	"Bring Me the Head of Flash Gordon"	Andrés Klacik	Thomas Warkentin	August 12, 1991	November 23, 1991	TBA
D2–150	"The Big Jump"	Andrés Klacik	Thomas Warkentin	November 25, 1991	April 4, 1992	TBA
D2–151	"Return to Fear"	Andrés Klacik	Thomas Warkentin	April 6, 1992	October 3, 1992	TBA
D2–152	"Bean Men of Mumbo"	Andrés Klacik	Thomas Warkentin	October 5, 1992	July 3, 1993	TBA

== Daily and Sunday strips by Dan Schkade ==
Flash Gordon was relaunched as a combined daily and Sunday strip by Dan Schkade on October 22, 2023. The new series started with a Sunday page that established a new continuity adapted for a modern audience. The story arcs by Schkade have in general been published over a period of ten weeks, where each Sunday page has been a summary of the previous six daily strips from a specific character's perspective. The following are the story arcs by Schkade since October 23, 2023.

No.	Serial title	Artist	Written by	Start date	End date	Ref.
DS1	"Get Barin"	Dan Schkade	Dan Schkade	October 23, 2023	January 7, 2024	
Flash, Dale and Zarkov have been tasked by Aura to find Barin after the decisive battle between Ming and the allied Mongothic nations.
DS2	"Nineveh!"	Dan Schkade	Dan Schkade	January 8, 2024	March 17, 2024	
A murder case occurs during Barin's and Aura's wedding feast, and Flash is framed; Dale and Zarkov strive to uncover the real murderer.
DS3	"Snowsteel"	Dan Schkade	Dan Schkade	March 18, 2024	May 26, 2024	
Fria invites Flash, Dale, Bok and Zarkov to the frozen kingdom of Frigia that is threatened by the Screaming Storm.
DS4	"The High Life"	Dan Schkade	Dan Schkade	May 27, 2024	August 4, 2024	
Flash, Dale, Bok and Zarkov are brought to Sky City by Hawkmen to help Vultan recreate Ming’s planetary disruptor.
DS5	"Mongothic"	Dan Schkade	Dan Schkade	August 5, 2024	October 20, 2024	
Flash and Dale are stranded up in the Magnetic Mountains, close to Ming's crashed flagship, and later rejoin with the Power Men.
DS6	"Hard Sun"	Dan Schkade	Dan Schkade	October 21, 2024	February 9, 2025	
While Flash and Dale travel to the land of the Lion Men for a peace summit with the Shark Men, Bok and Zarkov escape from a flying ship and are rescued by Adrane.
DS7	"Lowland Station Tales"	J. Bone, Sandy Jarrell, Erica Henderson, Ted Naifeh, Jordan Gibson & Dan Schkade	Dan Schkade	February 10, 2025	March 30, 2025	
A group of strangers gather in a bar at Lowland Station, each sharing their unique encounters with Flash.
DS8	"The Caves Have Eyes"	Dan Schkade	Dan Schkade	March 31, 2025	June 8, 2025	
Flash, Dale, Bok and Zarkov enter the caves of Kira to get Frigian battle plans back from Azura in Castle Syk.
DS9	"Parts Unknown"	Dan Schkade	Dan Schkade	June 9, 2025	August 17, 2025	
Spatial disks from Castle Syk send Bok to the frozen kingdom of Frigia, Flash to unknown hallways populated by robots, Dale to the forest kingdom of Arboria, and Zarkov to an unknown place.
DS10	"The Thrones of Mongo"	Dan Schkade	Dan Schkade	August 18, 2025	October 19, 2025	
The classic Tournament of Mongo combines a blood and sand sports drama with a tense political thriller.
DS11	"Stand and Deliver"	Dan Schkade	Dan Schkade	October 20, 2025	January 4, 2026	
Ming is back vowing to forgive the people of Mongo if Flash, Barin and Aura are slain, but Flash and Aura escapes with Bones Malock while Dale, Zarkov, Barin, Thun, Dova and Velle flee the Tournament arena from the angry mob of people.
MINI–ARC	"So What’s Your Story?"	Dan Schkade	Dan Schkade	January 5, 2026	January 11, 2026	
A special one-week mini-arc celebrating the strips 92nd anniversary.
DS12	"Arm's Reach"	Dan Schkade	Dan Schkade	January 12, 2026	March 29, 2026	
Bok spies on Ming to discover about his evil plans to take over Mongo while Flash, Dale and Zarkov travel to the Power District to rejoin with the Power Men following a citywide blackout in the Capital City.
DS13	"Ex Libris"	Sandy Jarrell & Dan Schkade	Dan Schkade	March 30, 2026	June 7, 2026	
Guided by Inquisitor Aegia, Flash, Dale, Bok and Zarkov descend beneath the Capital City into the ancient library to uncover the hidden history of Mongo, the legacy of King Rolin, and the dark tale of how Ming rose to become the most evil ruler in Mongo.
DS14	"Fire In The Sky!"	Dan Schkade	Dan Schkade	June 8, 2026	August 9, 2026	
Ming grants Galo the chance to reclaim his place as a rocket fighter, while Flash and Bok journey to Sky City to aid the Frigians and Hawkmen in their mission and to persuade Fria and Vultan to join their side against Ming’s tyranny.
DS15	"The Dead Lands"	Dan Schkade	Dan Schkade	August 10, 2026	October 18, 2026	
Flash, Dale, Bok and Adrane journey to the land of Tropica, while in the aftermath of Sky City’s destruction by Ming and its fall from the skies, Fria is rescued in the Westlands by Airman Hollo, joined by Barin and Aura.
MINI–ARC	"Maps of Mongo"	Dan Schkade	Dan Schkade	October 19, 2026	October 25, 2026	
A special one-week mini-arc to review the world of Mongo.
DS16	"The Heat"	Dan Schkade	Dan Schkade	October 26, 2026	January 3, 2027 (expected)	
Zarkov travels to Frigia to join a conference of scientists that Fria assembled across Mongo while Princess Desira travels with Flash, Dale, Bok and Adrane to South Tropica.
