= Prince Thun =

Fictional character appearing in Flash Gordon

Publication information
- Publisher: King Features Syndicate
- First appearance: Flash Gordon comic strip; (February 11, 1934)
- Created by: Alex Raymond

In-story information
- Supporting character of: Flash Gordon

Prince Thun is a fictional character who appeared in various forms of the Flash Gordon comic strip and film productions. He is a Lion Man of Mongo and one of Flash's most trusted friends. His Father is King Jugrid, ruler of the Lion Men, and one of the three mightiest rulers of Mongo.

== In comics ==
Thun first appeared in the Alex Raymond comic strip of the 1930s and quickly became an ally of Flash, after meeting him during a Lion Men attack on Mingo City. Thun and the other Lion Men are depicted as human-like aliens, but with orange skin and leonine tails. The Lion Men are shown as living in tents and using "Space Gyro" aircraft, which are capable of defeating Ming's rocket ships in aerial combat. The Lion Men also have access to artillery, and are shown to own a mortar gun capable of destroying a small city. Thun helped Flash Gordon twice in stopping Ming from marrying Dale. Thun and the Lion Men appeared on a semi-regular basis in the later Flash Gordon comic strips. In the Dan Barry Flash Gordon stories, Thun and the Lion Men live in a region called Leonia, in caves resembling mine shafts.

Thun has regularly appeared in the various Flash Gordon comic books. The character has appeared in the 1988 DC Comics adaptation Flash Gordon by Dan Jurgens. Thun subsequently turned up in the Ardden Entertainment Flash Gordon comics. Thun was depicted in the Dynamite Entertainment Flash Gordon mini-series, where he closely resembled his depiction from the Filmation cartoon. Thun's homeland was named "Ardentia" here, after the 1980 film.

== In other media ==
In 1936, Thun was first played by James Pierce in the film serial entitled Flash Gordon. Thun appeared in the serial much as he did in the comic strip, a humanoid with a wild shock of long hair and a long beard, creating the overall effect of a lion's mane.

Flash, Dale and Zarkov encounter a "lion-man" in "The Forbidden Experiment", the 25th episode of the 1954 syndicated television series, although he is not identified on-screen as Thun. His body and face are covered with fur and he has fangs and mane-like hair. He has the power to command animals and is seeking to become fully human in appearance. The actor is not credited.

Thun next appeared in the 1979 Filmation series. In the feature-length pilot for the series, Thun was voiced by Ted Cassidy. However, Cassidy died before production of the series, so the role was recast with Allan Melvin (who also played Vultan) providing the voice. In this series, Thun appeared as a literal lion man, with a lion's head and claws on a human body. He was referred to as a king, rather than a prince. Thun is the first of Flash's allies on Mongo, and the most loyal and steadfast. It was heavily implied that there was an entire race of Lion Men on Mongo, but Thun was the only one who ever appeared onscreen.

In 1980, a character called Prince Thun was played by George Harris in the Dino De Laurentiis film version. He was referred to as the Prince of Ardentia, and appeared human and clean-shaven. When he offered his loyalty "without measure", Ming the Merciless commanded him to fall on his sword. Instead, he attacked Ming and was destroyed, paralyzed by Ming's probe and then stabbed with his sword by Ming, revealing him to have blue blood.

In the 1996 Flash Gordon cartoon, Prince Thun was replaced by Princess Thundar. Like the earlier animated Thun, she was a literal lion-person, somewhat resembling the Thundercats. Like the other main characters, she was a teenager and worked with Flash, Dale Arden and Prince Talon of the Hawk-People to overthrow Ming.

A character named Thun does not appear in the 2007 Flash Gordon live action series, in which the Lion Men are renamed Turin. In this version, they are led by Bolgar, played by Shawn Reis. Bolgar becomes an ally of Flash in the episode "Blame", when Flash saves his son Rivu (Sebastian Gacki) from poisoning and convinces him that the Deviates are not responsible. The Turin resemble the original Lion Men, humans with claws and mane-like hair. They also roar like lions when angry.
