= Prince Barin =

Character in the Flash Gordon stories

Publication information
- Publisher: King Features Syndicate
- First appearance: Flash Gordon (1936)
- Created by: Alex Raymond

In-story information
- Supporting character of: Flash Gordon

Prince Barin is a character in the Flash Gordon stories. He is king of a region of Mongo called Arboria. Barin becomes one of Flash's best friends, and is deeply in love with Princess Aura. In his appearance and characterisation, Barin resembles the character of Robin Hood. Like Robin Hood, Barin is depicted as an unjustly outlawed nobleman who wears green, uses a bow, and lives in a forest.

Barin appears regularly in the Flash Gordon comic strip, becoming the ruler of Mongo after Ming's overthrow.

== In other media ==
Prince Barin was first portrayed by Richard Alexander in the 1936 Flash Gordon film serial. He reprised the same role in the 1938 sequel Flash Gordon's Trip to Mars. In the 1940 sequel Flash Gordon Conquers the Universe, the role was portrayed by Roland Drew.

Alan Oppenheimer provided the voice of Prince Barin in the 1979 Filmation animated series. Here, Barin is depicted as a master archer, armed with arrows encasing any item they strike in ice. His fortress city in Arboria is highly advanced, and almost equal in technology to Mingo City. The city is protected by a defensive energy shield and by squadrons of formidable airships called Leaf Fighters. Barin also makes use of a gigantic tank-like drilling machine called the Mecha-Mole.

In 1980, Prince Barin was portrayed by Timothy Dalton in the film Flash Gordon produced by Dino De Laurentiis. The prince becomes the heir to the throne of Mongo, but evil Ming the Merciless steals the throne. Barin is banished to the forest moon of Arboria. He is in love with Ming's daughter, Princess Aura, and she decides to hide Flash there after saving him from execution. Jealous of Aura's love for Flash he tries to kill him, but they are captured by Hawkmen and forced to fight. After Flash saves Barin from falling to his death during the fight, the Prince becomes an ally. He is sentenced to execution by Ming with Zarkov, but Aura frees them. The prince eventually joins forces with Flash Gordon, Dale Arden, Dr. Hans Zarkov and Prince Vultan of the Hawkmen in order to overthrow Ming, and at the end he becomes Mongo's apparent ruler, and makes Vultan the leader of his armies.

Steve Bacic portrayed Prince Barin in the 2007 Flash Gordon television series. Although Ming plans a union between Barin and Aura at one point, the two despise each other and the wedding is called off following an assassination attempt by Barin on Ming. Barin is then saved from execution when Flash organizes a fake prophecy to imply that killing Barin would jeopardize Ming's rule.
