= Mongo (Flash Gordon) =

Primary setting of the Flash Gordon franchise

- Flash Gordon location
- Map of the planet Mongo
- Created by: Alex Raymond
- Genre: Various

In-universe information
- Type: Planet
- Races: Yellow People; Hawkmen; Lion Men; Gillmen; Lizard Men; Tusked Men; Ape Men; Shark Men; Blue Dragon Men; Brown Dwarves; Death Dwarfs; Panther Men; Wolfmen; Indigenous People of Arboria; Savages; Fire People; Magic Men
- Locations: Mingo City (Capital city); Arboria; Frigia; Coralia; Land of the Lion Men; Magnetic Mountains; Tropica; The Fire Lands; Sky City; Kira the Cavern Kingdom; Syk, capital of Kira
- Characters: Prince Barin; Princess Aura; Queen Fria; Queen Undina; Prince Thun; King Jugrid of The Lionmen; Tahl; Naquk the Ice King; King Orax of the Fire People; King Kala of the Shark Men; King Vultan; Ming the Merciless; Count Bulok; Doctor Bono; Prince Rolan; Prince Alan; Tahut; Queen Desira of Tropica; Gundar, the Desert Hawk; Brazor; Ergon of the Power Men; Queen Azura; Kang the Cruel; Storm Queen Valkir
- Moon(s): Lunita, Exila, Arkaylia, Surd
- Continents: Tropica, Unexplored continent
- Oceans: Sea of Mystery

Mongo is a fictional planet where the comic strip (and later movie serials) of Flash Gordon takes place. Mongo was created by the comics artist Alex Raymond in 1934, with the assistance of Raymond's ghostwriter Don W. Moore. Mongo is depicted as being ruled by a usurper named Ming the Merciless, who is shown as a harsh and oppressive dictator.

The planet is depicted as being inhabited by different cultures, and having a varied ecosystem. The technology of these cultures varies from groups at a Stone Age level, to highly technologically advanced peoples. At the beginning of the comic strip, almost all of these cultures are shown as being under the domination of the tyrant Ming. In all the versions of the Flash Gordon story, Flash Gordon is shown as unifying the peoples of Mongo against Ming, and eventually removing him from power. Later stories often depict Mongo under the rule of its rightful leader, Prince Barin.

== Overview ==
In the Flash Gordon comic strips and comic books, Mongo is usually depicted as Earth-like. Its atmosphere is compatible with Terran life, and the dominant species on Mongo are human-like, such as Ming's people and the Arborians. Other peoples of Mongo have evolved into different forms, such as the winged Hawkmen, the tailed Lion Men, and the underwater dwelling Coralians. Mongo is about half the diameter of Earth but is considerably denser, so its gravity is only slightly weaker than the Earth's, although it still allows Flash Gordon to put his gymnastics skills to good use. Mongo has a variety of climates, and is inhabited by enormous, dinosaur-like monsters.

In Alex Raymond's comic strip and the Flash Gordon movie serials, Mongo was shown as a rogue planet that had drifted into the Solar System. Later versions of the Flash Gordon story, such as the 1980 film, the 1996 cartoon series, and the Dynamite Entertainment comics, show Mongo as being in another planetary system or galaxy, and coming into contact with Earth's system through a wormhole-like portal.

The demonym of the planet's people vary according to different writers. Mongo's inhabitants have been referred to as "Mongonians", "Mongoans", and "Mongori".

== Alex Raymond's depiction ==
Mongo was first introduced in the comic strip as a "rogue planet", threatening to collide with Earth. After Hans Zarkov abducted Flash Gordon and Dale Arden, they crash-landed Zarkov's rocket ship on Mongo near Mingo City, Ming's capital. Mingo City is near the equator of the planet. Mingo City is an enormous metropolis from where Ming's government rules most of the planet. Mongo's political structure is portrayed as exclusively monarchical. Each realm Flash Gordon visits has its own king or queen. At the start of the strip, most of the kingdoms of Mongo are under Ming's suzerainty, and their rulers always follow Ming's commands. The exceptions are Prince Barin and Thun, ruler of the Lion Men. When Flash Gordon arrives on Mongo, he finds Prince Barin is leading a guerrilla war against Ming from Arboria. Thun, the Lion Man, is also Ming's active enemy.

Under Mingo City is a power station where the Power Men of Mongo, a group of electrical engineers led by Ergon, work. Also beneath Mingo City is an abandoned sewer system where a band of rebels against Ming's rule,"the Freeman" make their base. The Freeman are led by the eyepatch-wearing Count Bulok. To the west of Mingo City is the Land of the Lion Men, ruled by King Thun. The Lion Men's country is rendered by Raymond as a region of rocky hills dotted by bushes. The Lion Men are shown as living in large tents and flying "Space Gyro" aircraft. Bordering the Sea of Mystery is the city of the Shark Men, led by Ming supporter King Kala. Underneath the fog-shrouded Sea of Mystery, is the underwater kingdom of Coralia, ruled by Queen Undina. Northeast of Mingo City is the airborne Sky City of the Hawkmen, governed by Vultan. Sky City hovers above a region of grassland dotted with crags. Between Mingo City and Sky City is the land of the Brown Dwarves. East of Sky City is Flame World, a dusty region of scarps and ravines of basaltic rock. Flame World owes its name to the lava eruptions that regularly occur in the area. East of the Lion Men's kingdom are the Magnetic Mountains, which emanate magnetic forces that often interfere with the navigation of aircraft flying over them. Southwards from these Mountains is a "Tournament Arena" where the peoples of Mongo meet once a year for the "Tournament of Death", a combat to the death between Mongo's gladiators. Part of the planet is covered by the forest kingdom of Arboria, ruled by Prince Barin, leader of the Treemen who live there. Arboria has enormous trees resembling giant redwoods. Arboria is also inhabited by two primitive tribes hostile to the Treemen: the blue-skinned, fanged Tusk Men, a group of cannibals, and the warlike Horned Ape Men. To the far north, an area of mountains and caverns makes up the frozen kingdom of Frigia, ruled by Queen Fria. Frigia has enormous, ostrich-like "snowbirds" that the inhabitants ride. Frigia's inhabitants are shown as being technologically advanced, using rocket ships, electric heaters, and transparent "snowsuits" capable of protecting their inhabitants from the cold. The Frigians are often attacked by giants three times the size of a normal human. These giants are led by their chieftain, Brukka. A railroad, with rocket-powered passenger trains running on it, links Mingo City and Frigia's southern borderland.

Mongo also has extensive underground domains. One of these domains is Kira the Cave World. Kira's capital is Syk, ruled by the evil Queen Azura, ruler of the Blue Magic Men. Kira is also inhabited by Lizard Men who capture and eat the other inhabitants of Mongo. South of Kira is "Volcano World", a realm of mountains and lava flows. In this region dwell the Fire People, who wear suits of asbestos armour and use flamethrowers in combat. The Fire People are led by Ming's ally, King Orax, and are known for their ability to build devastating weapons. Westwards is a jungle, home of the Monkey Men. Further west is the Great Desert of Mongo, the largest such region on the planet. The Great Desert is the base for Ming's Desert Legion, as well as the home of pastoral nomads who oppose Ming's rule. At the planet's south pole is the Ice Kingdom of Naquk. Naquk is the ruler of a group of giants aligned with Ming's forces. These giants are more technologically advanced than the variety in Frigia, and travel in mechanical "tractor sleds" fitted with artillery guns.

Across the eastern ocean there are two island continents. One is the jungle continent of Tropica, ruled by Queen Desira. Tropica's north and western coasts have a warm, Mediterranean-like climate, rich in verdure. A dense jungle covers the middle of the continent, which contains deadly monsters called Tree Dragons. Beyond this region lies the Fiery Desert of Mongo, a torrid region prone to volcanism. The Fiery Desert is home of Gundar the Desert Hawk and his Bedouin-like tribe. In Tropica, the villain Brazor usurps the rightful ruler Queen Desira and becomes' the area's tyrannical despot. Flash leads a rebellion against Brazor (who briefly replaced Ming as the comic strip's main antagonist) and eventually defeats him. To the north-west of Tropica is an "Unexplored Continent".

== Later depictions ==
After Raymond left the Flash Gordon strip in 1944, his successors would add new characters and locations to Mongo. Austin Briggs created Kang the Cruel, the son of Ming. Kang would depose Barin and take over Mongo, resulting in Flash leading another rebellion. Mac Raboy created several new elements for the fictional planet's mythology, including giving Mongo two moons, Lunita and Exila, as well as the ice kingdom of Polaria, ruled by the tyrant Polon, (who has the power to shrink or enlarge living things). Jim Keefe made the Unexplored Continent the location where the villain Garakahn had his fortress. In some versions of the comic strip, Mingo City is renamed "Alania" after Ming's overthrow.

In the 2011 Dynamite Comics Flash Gordon:Zeitgeist, Ming opens a portal between dimensions to enable Mongo to attack Earth in the year 1934. This story also describes Mongo as the "Crossroads of the Known Universes". The prequel, Merciless:The Rise of Ming depicts Ming's ascent to power over Mongo. In this version Emperor Krang, wishes to unite Mongo's five warring realms (Arboria, Ardentia, Aerie, Aquaria, and Frigia). Krang's son, Ming, eventually does so by force. In the later Dynamite Flash Gordon series, Mongo is the base of Ming's empire. Mongo harbours a "Valley of Portals" which contains portals which lead to the other worlds Ming rules, including Arboria and Coralia.

== Cartography ==
Arlene Williamson (the first wife of Al Williamson) and Jim Keefe both drew maps of the planet Mongo, based closely on Raymond's stories. The game Flash Gordon & the Warriors of Mongo (see below), also featured Lin Carter's map of the planet, similar to the Arlene Williamson version.

== Mongo in other media ==
=== Radio ===
Starting April 22, 1935, the radio serial The Amazing Interplanetary Adventures of Flash Gordon, began airing. The series featured stories set on Mongo, closely following the plot of the comic strip.

=== Film ===
==== Flash Gordon (1936 serial) ====
The 1936 serial depicts Mongo as a rogue planet drifting towards Earth. The serial's Mongo is a wild, rocky planet filled with monsters.

==== Flash Gordon Conquers the Universe ====
The second Flash Gordon serial was set on Mars, but the third returned to Mongo. In Flash Gordon Conquers the Universe Flash and his friends travel to Mongo's land of Frigia to find a cure for the Purple Death, which is ravaging Earth.

==== Flash Gordon (1980 film) ====
In the Flash Gordon film from 1980, Mongo is depicted as a barren world covered with tall, very slender hills that look like spikes, but with a very colorful extended atmosphere that is capable of supporting the weight of various miles-wide chunks of rock that are called "moons", including Arboria and Frigia. The people of Mongo resemble humans but with slight differences, such as having blue or green blood, or having their bodies undergo rapid disintegration when killed. The novelization of the film by Arthur Byron Cover adds further information about this version of the planet. This Mongo is an enormous rocky plateau that sits at the still centre of "an ancient cosmic whirlpool", outside the normal flow of time and space. Mongo was settled in "the dim forgotten past" by Ming's people. Ming uses a portal called the "Imperial Vortex" to attack planets from Mongo; Dr. Zarkov's space capsule travels to Mongo after being sucked into this vortex. The whirlpool often sucks in meteors and makes them crash on the planet; Mongo's people often mine these meteors for their minerals.

=== Television ===
==== The New Adventures of Flash Gordon ====
This 1979 version depicted a planet Mongo similar to Raymond's original comic strips, featuring the kingdoms and peoples, and rulers who feature prominently in the 1930s stories. However, some minor changes were made (the Lion Men had the heads of lions in addition to tails, and Brazor was renamed "Braznor"). It also featured a storyline involving the caverns of the Witch Kingdom of Sykland. Queen Azura, the ruler, becomes convinced that Gordan is the reincarnation of Ghor-Dhan, the legendary founder of Syk.

==== Defenders of the Earth ====
The 1986 cartoon showed a frozen planet Mongo where all the natural resources had been exhausted, thus motivating Ming to move to Earth and attack the planet.

==== Flash Gordon (1996 TV series) ====
In this animated version, Flash, Dale and Zarkov arrive on Mongo through a dimensional portal. They are trapped on the planet after sealing the portal to stop Ming using it to invade Earth. This version renamed the Hawkmen "Birdmen" and the Lion Men "Leonids".

==== Flash Gordon (2007 TV series) ====
In the Scifi Channel series Flash Gordon, Mongo is a planet, "in another dimension" (i.e. parallel universe). It is explained that "the dimensional shift" is "quite small" and that there is an inherent connection between Earth and Mongo, where the quantum mechanics of Bell's theorem and EPR paradox are working on a planetary scale. That is why there are so many similarities between both worlds, including language and Homo Sapiens evolving on both planets. It is theorized that at some point in time and space, the two planets were much closer. Mongo's government is called the "United Peoples of Mongo", ruled by Emperor Ming.

In the episode Sorrow, it is revealed that Mongo was once a prosperous blue and green planet; it relied on a glowing red ore called zerilium that was mined on the moon. Mongo's inhabitants even built two small artificial moons named Arkaylia and Surd to process zerilium and shelter the miners. An accident on Mongo released poisonous zerilium gas into the air, which caused acid rain, killed wildlife, and contaminated Mongo's water. The planet became uninhabitable. A small portion of Mongo's people emigrated to Arkaylia. After three generations on the artificial moon, Mongo's environment partially repaired itself. As a result, the people returned to the planet. Clean water, known as "source water", still remained scarce and came from underground. Centuries later, Ming seized power and began his rule.

=== Role-playing games ===
The 1977 Fantasy Games Unlimited role-playing game Flash Gordon & the Warriors of Mongo used the planet Mongo as its setting. The game was designed by science fiction writer Lin Carter and game designer Scott Bizar. Players took the role of rebels attempting to recruit the various peoples of Mongo to rebel against Ming. The game had information describing the various realms of the planet.

In 2018, Pinnacle Entertainment Group (Pinnacle Games) published The Savage World of Flash Gordon RPG. The 192 page genre setting was written by Scott Woodard with artwork drawn by the original comic strip artist, Alex Raymond.

== Critical analysis ==
Comics historian Ron Goulart suggests that the plot of Mongo threatening to collide with Earth was inspired by the novel When Worlds Collide by Philip Wylie and Edwin Balmer, while the societies on the planet were informed by the works of popular science fiction writers Edgar Rice Burroughs and Abraham Merritt. Film historian Michael Benson describes Mongo as "a combination of the futuristic and the primitive. Though their technology is advanced, their Hollywood costumes resemble those of the Roman Empire. Mongonian soldiers, despite their superior arsenal, would prefer to draw swords for battle". Academic John Cheng identifies themes of yellow peril in depictions of Mongo's politics. Cheng calls these themes "different and more radical", as Ming's control of Mongo is absolute and openly acknowledged instead of a secret and shadowy conspiracy. Though they are the invaders, Flash Gordon and his friends are depicted as liberators of planet Mongo. Cheng states that their use of excorporation in order to weaken and ultimately unseat Ming reinforces his nature as "familiarly Asian".
