= Priscilla Lawson =

American actress (1914–1958)

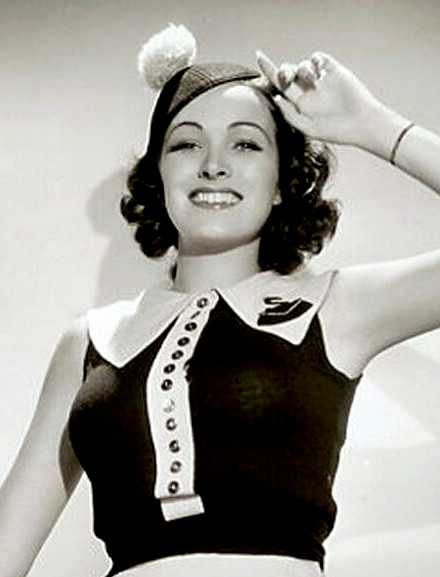
- Lawson in 1936
- Born: Priscilla Jones Shortridge; March 8, 1914; Indianapolis, Indiana, U.S.
- Died: August 27, 1958 (aged 44); Los Angeles, California, U.S.
- Occupation: Film actress
- Years active: 1935-1941
- Spouses: Gerald Lawson (m. 1932; died 1933) Alan Curtis (m. 1937; div. 1940)

Priscilla Jones Lawson (née Shortridge; March 8, 1914 – August 27, 1958), was an American actress best known for her role as Princess Aura in the original Flash Gordon serial (1936).

== Early years ==
Born in Indianapolis, Indiana, Lawson was the daughter of Elmer Shortridge, a railroad yard foreman and machinist, and his wife, Elizabeth (née Hess) Shortridge.

== Career ==
Lawson was a professional model by her early twenties and was named Miss Miami Beach in 1935, after which she was employed as an Earl Carroll chorus girl at the Miami Casino. This gained her a contract with Universal Studios, which used her in a variety of small roles. However, in 1936 she was cast in the serial Flash Gordon as the voluptuous daughter of the villain, Ming the Merciless. Princess Aura's rivalry with Dale Arden for Flash Gordon's affection was one of the centerpieces of the serial and gained Lawson cult figure status.

Roy Kinnard wrote in Science Fiction Serials that "Lawson's notable physical assets were responsible for incurring the wrath of censors" in the filming of Flash Gordon. Co-star Jean Rogers told him that censors ordered retakes of Chapter 1 of the serial with Lawson "wearing slightly less revealing garb." Her screen career ended in 1941.

== Personal life ==
Lawson was married to:

- Gerald A. Lawson (1906–1933), a furniture salesman, on March 8, 1932; he died the following year of croupous pneumonia.
- Alan Curtis (1909–1953), American actor, in November 1937. They divorced in 1940.

== Later life ==
After her second marriage ended, Lawson enlisted in the Women's Army Corps during World War II. An unverified rumor claims she lost a leg in an accident while serving in the Army. Another version is that she lost a leg in a 1937 car crash. However, her Flash Gordon co-star Jean Rogers denied that Lawson had lost a leg, and it was also rejected in a biographical review in an Indianapolis journal. In later life, she managed a stationery shop in Los Angeles, California, and worked for two pottery companies as a finisher.

== Death ==
On August 27, 1958, Lawson died at 44 in Monrovia, California, due to cirrhosis and upper gastrointestinal bleeding caused by a duodenal ulcer. She was interred at Live Oak Memorial Park in Monrovia.

== Filmography ==
Film
Year	Title	Role	Notes
1935	His Night Out	Hatcheck Girl	Uncredited
1935	The Great Impersonation	Maid	Uncredited
1936	Dangerous Waters	Valparaiso Bar Girl - Back to Wall	Uncredited
1936	Don't Get Personal	Bridesmaid	Uncredited
1936	Sutter's Gold	Native Girl	Uncredited
1936	Flash Gordon	Princess Aura	Serial
1936	The Phantom Rider	Dance-Hall Girl	Serial, Uncredited
1936	Yours for the Asking	Minor Role	Uncredited
1936	Straight from the Shoulder	Minor Role	Uncredited
1936	Wives Never Know	Laboratory Assistant	Uncredited
1936	The Big Broadcast of 1937	Minor Role	Uncredited
1936	Rose Bowl	Florence Taylor	
1936	The Accusing Finger	Hat Check Girl	Uncredited
1936	College Holiday	Student / Phone Operator	Uncredited
1937	Internes Can't Take Money	Nurse	Uncredited
1937	King of Gamblers	Grace	Uncredited
1937	Double Wedding	Felice	
1937	The Last Gangster	Girl in Dive	Uncredited
1938	Arsène Lupin Returns	Switchboard Operator	Uncredited
1938	The First Hundred Years	Mary Brown - Lynn's Secretary	Uncredited
1938	The Girl of the Golden West	Nina Martinez	
1938	Test Pilot	Mabel	
1938	Three Comrades	Frau Brunner - Sanatorium Clerk	Uncredited
1938	The Toy Wife	Dark Woman	Uncredited
1938	Heroes of the Hills	Madeline Reynolds	
1938	Three Loves Has Nancy	Gertie - at the Party	Uncredited
1939	The Women	Hairdresser #1	Uncredited
1941	Billy the Kid	Bessie - Barmaid	Uncredited, (final film role)
