= Tracey Hoyt =

Canadian voice actress

- Born: Chatham-Kent, Ontario, Canada
- Occupation: Actress
- Years active: 1990-present
- Known for: Original DIC voice of Chibiusa in Sailor Moon

Tracey Hoyt born in Chatham-Kent, Ontario, Canada is a Canadian voice actress and alumna of York University and the Second City National Touring Company (Toronto), possessing a Bachelor of Fine Arts in Theatre Performance. She played the first North American voice of Rini in the Sailor Moon R series and the three Sailor Moon movies. Hoyt played the voice of Me Bear in 2005's The Care Bears' Big Wish Movie. Currently, she appears as Ms. Deeds in Delilah & Julius (Family Channel Canada) and as Guinivere in Bob and Margaret. (YTV Canada). Tracey is a double Gemini nominee for her work on CBC TV's comedy series The Tournament. She has voiced hundreds of radio and TV commercials.

She was a guest of honour at Toronto's Pretty Heroes fan convention as part of its 10th anniversary celebration in July, 2025. In October of that year Hoyt was inducted into the Chatham-Kent Cultural Hall of Fame.

== Filmography ==
- Bob and Margaret – Guinivere
- Outcast – Lisa
- Street Legal – Immigration Officer #2
- Keroppi – Keroleen, Meroleen ("The Frog's Secret House") (English dub)
- Super Jem Duo – Jem
- Flash Gordon – Princess Aura
- Gotti – Woman On Camera 5
- Time to Say Goodbye? – Mary
- Supertown Challenge – Sue Vanditelli
- Sailor Moon – Rini (Season 2) (DiC dub)
- Sailor Moon R the Movie: Promise of the Rose – Rini (DiC/Pioneer dub)
- Sailor Moon S the Movie: Hearts in Ice – Rini/Sailor Mini Moon (DiC/Pioneer dub)
- Sailor Moon SuperS the Movie: Black Dream Hole – Rini/Super Sailor Mini Moon (DiC/Pioneer dub)
- Scandalous Me: The Jacqueline Susann Story – Harper Lee
- The Koala Brothers – Ned (voice only; all episodes)
- Pecola – Hilary
- Straight in the Face – Marilyn
- The World of Piwi — Lillie (1st voice), Emily (1st voice)
- Sue Thomas: F.B.Eye – Mrs. Whitcombe
- Godsend – Delivery Nurse
- Radio Free Roscoe – Miss Emily Mitchell
- Doc – Kathleen
- The Tournament – Aurora Farqueson
- Kevin Hill – Gwen Claypool
- This Is Wonderland – Business Woman
- The Prize Winner of Defiance, Ohio – Betty White
- The Care Bears' Big Wish Movie – Me Bear
- M.V.P. – Charge Nurse
- The Cat in the Hat Knows a Lot About That! - Nick's Mom/Sally's Mom
- Decoys
