= Anna Van Hooft =

Canadian actress

Anna Van Hooft is a Canadian actress. She is known for her role as Princess Aura in the 2007 TV adaptation of Flash Gordon.

She also had a recurring role as a voice actress in the animated series Trollz.

== Filmography ==
=== Film ===
Year	Title	Role	Notes
2006	The Wicker Man	Attendant #2	
2012	Halloweenies	Miss Malone	Short
2015	Asteroid: Final Impact	Sandra	
2016	Warcraft	Aloman	
2017	The Marine 5: Battleground	Zoe Williams	Video
2017	Crash Pad	Samantha	
2019	Noelle	Elf Mary	

=== Television ===
Year	Title	Role	Notes
2000	Caitlin's Way	Girl #1	"Playing Caitlin"
2003	The Incredible Mrs. Ritchie	Samantha	TV film
2003	Hollywood Wives: The Next Generation	Girlfriend #2	TV film
2005	Trollz	Onyx Von Trollenberg (voice)	Main role
2006	CSI: Crime Scene Investigation	Stephanie	"I Like to Watch"
2007–08	Flash Gordon	Princess Aura	Recurring role
2009–12	Fringe	Nina's Assistant	Recurring role
2010–11	True Justice	Cynthia Chase	"Deadly Crossing: Part 1", "From Russia with Drugs", "Street Wars: Part 2"
2011	Human Target	Andrea	"A Problem Like Maria"
2013	Emily Owens, M.D.	Sierra La Roche	"Emily and... The Car and the Cards"
2013	Supernatural	Artemis	"Remember the Titans"
2013	Arrow	Jenn	"Salvation"
2014	Witches of East End	Caroline	"Art of Darkness", "Sex, Lies, and Birthday Cake", "Smells Like King Spirit"
2014	Intruders	Young Rose	"There Is No End"
2015	Bridal Wave	Melissa	TV film
2015	Real Murders: An Aurora Teagarden Mystery	Melanie Clark	TV film
2015	Asteroid: Final Impact	Sandra	TV film
2015	Cedar Cove	Linnette Mcafee	Recurring role
2015	Tis the Season for Love	Nicole	TV film
2015	A Gift Wrapped Christmas	Victoria	TV film
2017	Love at First Bark	Sherry McRay	TV film
2017	The Perfect Bride	Janna Tate	TV film
2017	My Baby is Gone!	Kelly Conway	TV film
2018	Love, Once and Always	Hannah	TV film
2018	Life Sentence	Unknown	TV series
2018	Altered Carbon	Clarissa Severin	TV series
2019	The Murders	Isabel Townsend	TV series
2019	Riverdale	Mrs. Ronson	TV series: "Fear the Reaper"
2020	Supergirl	Jennifer Bates	"Reality Bytes"
2024	Superman & Lois	Producer	"Sharp Dressed Man"
