= Flash Gordon & the Warriors of Mongo =

1977 science-fiction role-playing game

Flash Gordon & the Warriors of Mongo is a science fiction role-playing game published by Fantasy Games Unlimited in 1977 that is based on the Flash Gordon franchise. It was the first role-playing game to be based on a pre-existing media property.

== Description ==
Flash Gordon & the Warriors of Mongo is a science-fantasy system based on the Flash Gordon comic series. The game uses a "schematic" rules system in which characters and play are defined in only the most general of terms. The game includes campaign setting material describing the realms of the planet Mongo.

To create a character, the players roll dice to determine four characteristics, and based on those, they choose one of three character classes: warrior, leader, or scientist. Unlike other role-playing games, the characters do not have hit points. Wounds are resolved on a case by case basis according to the situation.

The storyline and setting in Flash Gordon are both largely predetermined, since the game is dedicated to producing the "feel" of a Flash Gordon short story or film serial. Unlike the open-ended campaigns of Dungeons & Dragons that can go on for an indeterminate time, this game ends when a clear victory condition is achieved. As Jon Peterson noted in The Elusive Shift: How Role-Playing Games Forged Their Identity, "Just as it was possible for a premade setting to relieve a referee of the responsibility for inventing a world, so too could a design lift the burden of steering the narrative out of the referee's hand. The starkest example is Flash Gordon and the Warriors of Mongo (1977). Although the game takes place on the world of Mongo, the purpose of the system is no longer to simulate a world but instead to simulate a particular type of story."

== Publication history ==
Scott Bizar formed FGU in 1975 to publish wargames, but as Dungeons & Dragons suddenly rose in popularity, Bizar turned to role-playing games. One of his first publications was 1977's Flash Gordon & the Warriors of Mongo, a licensed role-playing game based on the Flash Gordon franchise that he designed with science-fiction/fantasy author Lin Carter. The end result was a 52-page book, with cardstock reference card, that featured interior art by Alex Raymond, and cover art by Gray Morrow. It was the first role-playing game that was based solely on a pre-existing media property.

== Reception ==
Ken St. Andre, the creator of Tunnels & Trolls, noted the "enormous potential" of this game, but added, "Unfortunately you will have to do most of the imaginative work yourself, as only the barest skeleton outline of various situations is described in the book."

Jon Peterson commented, "Not only is the Flash Gordon system built around a specific world, but the design itself scopes play to a specific type of story in the world: one where the characters aspire to defeat Ming. That is simply a premise for the game that all players must accept." Peterson went on to say, "Flash Gordon furnishes an early example in which the referee's creative contributions to a role-playing game is unrelated to building a world or even determining the flow of events."

== Other recognition ==
A copy of Flash Gordon & the Warriors of Mongo is held in the collection of the Strong National Museum of Play (object 110.2923).

== Other reviews and commentary ==
- Campaign #82
