= Prince Vultan =

Fictional character appearing in Flash Gordon

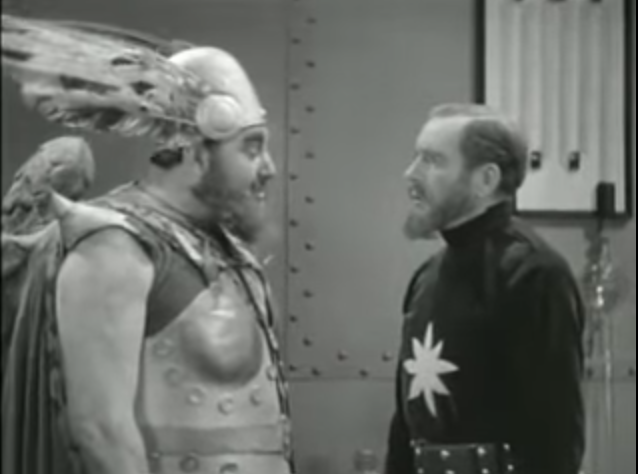
- Prince Vultan (Jack Lipson) confronts Dr. Zarkov (Frank Shannon) in Flash Gordon (1936)

Publication information
- Publisher: King Features Syndicate
- First appearance: Flash Gordon (1936)
- Created by: Alex Raymond

In-story information
- Supporting character of: Flash Gordon
- Abilities: Flight via artificial feather wings Enhanced strength and eyesight Temperature regulation Limited physical regeneration Serves as component of his artificial feather wings and archaic weaponry

Prince Vultan is a fictional character in the Flash Gordon comic strip and its adaptations. Vultan is the ruler of the Winged Bird-Men, a race of flying extraterrestrials who dwell in Sky City, a metropolis that floats in the sky. He fits the archetype of the Viking: strong, hearty, and with a great appetite for life, food, drink, and women (particularly Flash's girlfriend, Dale Arden).

== In the comics ==
Prince Vultan is introduced as a reluctant ally of main villain Ming the Merciless; he resents Ming's domination but does not oppose it out of fear of reprisal. However, after Flash and Dr. Zarkov save his city, he reforms into one of Flash Gordon's greatest allies. In the original comic, he has several wives, one of whom tries to kill Dale, as she is jealous of her. He claims to have become King of Sky City after winning one of the Tournaments of Mongo. When Ming tries to kidnap Flash, Vultan calls for a Tournament of Mongo. It is revealed that, along with Ming and King Jugrid of the Lion Men, he is one of the three most powerful rulers on Mongo. When Flash takes over the unconquered Kingdom of Caves, Vultan sends a party of Hawkmen under Captain Khan to help Flash conquer his Kingdom. The Hawkmen later come into conflict with Queen Azura and her Blue Magic Men. The image of the Hawkmen descending to attack Azura's army (from the June 16, 1935 storyline) is one of the most reproduced scenes from the Flash Gordon strip.

Vultan and the other Hawkmen provoked some controversy at the time of publication. Some Christian leaders regarded the characters as blasphemous because they resembled angels.

== In other media ==
In the 1936 film serial, he was portrayed by Jack Lipson (1901–1947).

Allan Melvin provided Vultan's voice in the 1979 Filmation animated series. He is referred to here as King Vultan, not Prince. His Sky City is a marvel of Mongo technology, as the massive construct is suspended miles above ground by beams of polarized anti-gravity light. Unlike Prince Barin's kingdom of Arboria, Vultan's Hawkmen do not make use of airships in battle. Instead, they fly under their own power or ride giant warbirds armed with harness-mounted energy cannons.

He was portrayed by Brian Blessed in the cult 1980 film Flash Gordon. For the film's soundtrack by the rock group Queen, Freddie Mercury composed a song called "Vultan's Theme". At the end, he is appointed the General of the Armies when Prince Barin is revealed as the rightful ruler of Mongo.

In the 1996 Flash Gordon animated series, Vultan is a somewhat conservative leader, and reluctant to act against Ming for fear of reprisals against his people. His role as Flash's ally is taken by his teenage son, Prince Talon.

In the 2007 television series, Vultan appears as one of the leaders of a group of nomadic mercenaries called Dactyls (a variation of the Hawkmen). In the episode, Ascension, Vultan travels to Earth, using Princess Aura's rift key. He kidnaps a teenage boy who he claims is his son. He is played by Ty Olsson.

In a 2008 episode of the animated sitcom Family Guy called "Road to Germany", Brian, Stewie and Mort enlist the help of Vultan's Hawkman Army in a dogfight over Europe against the Luftwaffe. Blessed returns to voice Vultan briefly during the episode.
