= Flash Gordon's Trip to Mars =

1938 film

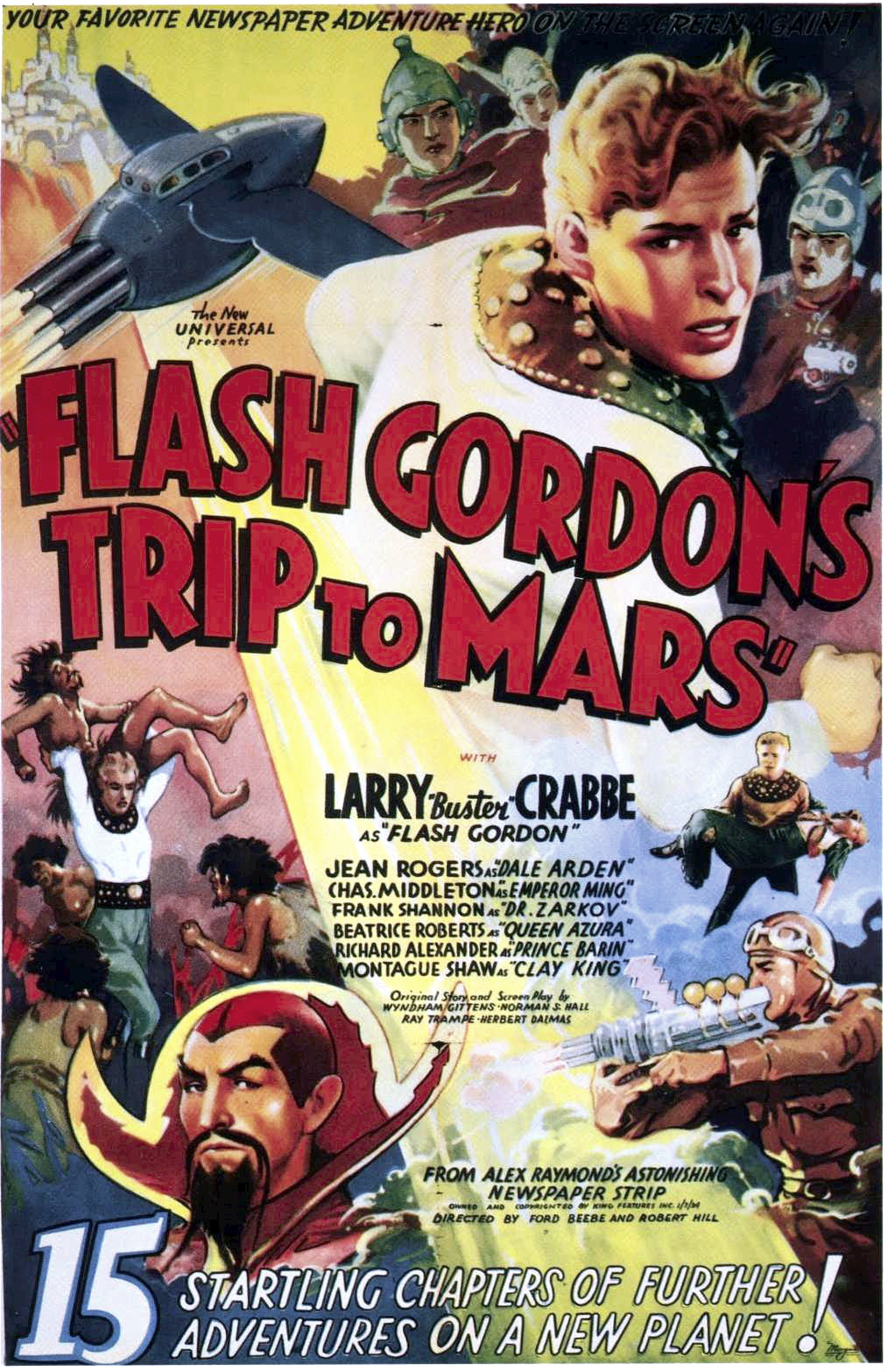
- Theatrical release poster
- Directed by: Ford Beebe; Robert F. Hill; Frederick Stephani (uncredited)
- Written by: Ray Trampe; Norman S. Hall; Wyndham Gittens; Herbert Dalmas
- Based on: Flash Gordon by Alex Raymond
- Starring: Buster Crabbe; Jean Rogers; Charles B. Middleton; Frank Shannon; Beatrice Roberts
- Cinematography: Jerome Ash
- Production company: Universal Pictures; King Features Syndicate
- Distributed by: Universal Pictures
- Release date: March 21, 1938
- Running time: 15 chapters (299 min)
- Country: United States
- Language: English

Flash Gordon's Trip to Mars is a 1938 Universal Pictures 15–chapter science-fiction movie serial based on the syndicated newspaper comic strip Flash Gordon. It is the second of the three Flash Gordon serials made by Universal between 1936 and 1940. The main cast from the first serial reprise their roles: Buster Crabbe as Flash Gordon, Jean Rogers as Dale Arden, Frank Shannon as Dr. Alexis Zarkov, Charles B. Middleton as Ming the Merciless, and Richard Alexander as Prince Barin. Also in the principal cast are Beatrice Roberts as Queen Azura, Donald Kerr as Happy Hapgood, Montague Shaw as the Clay King, and Wheeler Oakman as Tarnak. The serial was followed by Flash Gordon Conquers the Universe (1940).

== Plot ==
When a mysterious beam of light starts disrupting and destroying the Earth's atmosphere, Flash Gordon, Dr. Zarkov, and Dale Arden swing into action in Zarkov's rocketship, believing that it could be coming from the planet Mongo. Wisecracking reporter Happy Hapgood, having snuck aboard in hopes of a scoop, has no choice but to come along for the ride. Once in space, they discover that the ray originates from Mars.

Journeying to Mars, they discover their old enemy from Mongo, Ming the Merciless, is alive and allied with Azura, the Queen of Magic. Under her protection, he is operating a Nitron ray destroying Earth's atmosphere. Azura can transmute people into living clay, condemned to live and die in darkened caves, and she is hated and feared by most of the population. Conversely, the Clay People, led by their King, know how to eliminate Azura's power, but lack the means of escaping the caves to which their ruined bodies restrict them.

Flash and his party seem to hold the answer to their problem, so the Clay People hold Dale and Happy hostage against their kidnapping Azura and forcing her to undo the clay curse. The kidnapping attempt fails, and Flash and Zarkov are taken prisoner. As they fight to escape, they witness Ming walking through flames, and realize this is how he survived his seeming death on Mongo. Ultimately, the Earth visitors and the Clay People become allies in the tandem quest to defeat Azura and stop Ming from destroying the Earth. Flash, Dale, Zarkov, Happy, and Prince Barin do battle against Azura's magic and her Martian space force, the treacherous Forest People, and other dangers on Mars.

Ming orders a bombing of Flash's party, claiming that Azura will be protected by her magic, which in fact has been neutralized by the black sapphire. Azura is fatally injured by a bomb, and in a final act of mercy gives Flash instructions on how to remove the Clay People's curse. In gratitude for Flash freeing his brother from the curse, a Martian commander helps them infiltrate the palace, where Ming has arranged to be crowned ruler to replace Azura. Flash's party interrupts the ceremony and reveals Ming's role in Azura's death. Ming escapes the angered Martian people, and turns his Nitron ray on full intensity in order to destroy the Earth, ranting that he will next destroy Mars. Disturbed by this, Ming's assistant Tarnak betrays him, forcing Ming at gunpoint into the Disintegrating Room, a chamber of execution. Flash and Zarkov outwit and take down Tarnak, but find they are too late to save Ming. The Nitron ray is destroyed, and Flash, Dale, Zarkov, and Happy return to Earth in triumph, leaving the Clay King to rule Azura's people and Barin to rule the Forest People.

== Cast ==
- Buster Crabbe as Flash Gordon
- Jean Rogers as Dale Arden
- Charles B. Middleton as Ming the Merciless
- Frank Shannon as Dr. Alexis Zarkov
- Beatrice Roberts as Queen Azura
- Donald Kerr as Happy Hapgood
- Richard Alexander as Prince Barin
- C. Montague Shaw as Clay King
- Wheeler Oakman as Tarnak
- Kenne Duncan as Airdrome captain
- Warner Richmond as Zandar

Cast notes:

- Charles Middleton's portrayal of Ming is devilish in this serial, as opposed his Fu Manchu-like performance in the first serial.

== Production ==
This serial, the first sequel to the Flash Gordon serial, was based on the 1936 "Big Little Book" adaptation of the strip "Flash Gordon and the Witch Queen of Mongo". According to Harmon and Glut, the location was changed to Mars to capitalize on Orson Welles' famous War of the Worlds broadcast. According to Stedman, this serial preceded that broadcast, which made Universal hastily release a feature version of the serial as Mars Attacks the World to capitalize on the publicity. The film was a box-office success.

Flash Gordon's Trip to Mars was less expensive to make than the first Flash Gordon serial.

=== Mars Attacks the World ===
Universal Pictures also prepared a feature-length version of this serial, which was already ready for release in October 1938 when Orson Welles astounded the country with his Mercury Theatre on the Air radio production of H. G. Wells's The War of the Worlds. Universal then quickly had the feature's title changed to Mars Attacks the World, and a week after the Welles broadcast, opened it at a Broadway theater as a major premiere event. The original title for this feature had been Rocket Ship, which was subsequently used for reissues of the first Flash Gordon serial's feature version, which had been originally released under its source serial's title in 1936 in the United Kingdom.

== Critical reception ==
Time in 1938 declared the serial to be "a Grade A cinemedition of the famed King Features strip".

== Television broadcasting ==
In the 1950s, the three serials were broadcast on American television. To avoid confusion with a made-for-TV Flash Gordon series airing at the same time, they were retitled, becoming respectively Space Soldiers, Space Soldiers' Trip to Mars, and Space Soldiers Conquer the Universe. They were shown by PBS U.S. stations, and by ABC Weekend Television in the United Kingdom – where they aired as Flash Gordon serials, under their original titles.

== Chapters ==
- 01 "New Worlds to Conquer"
- 02 "The Living Dead"
- 03 "Queen of Magic"
- 04 "Ancient Enemies"
- 05 "The Boomerang"
- 06 "Tree-men of Mars"
- 07 "The Prisoner of Mongo"
- 08 "The Black Sapphire of Kalu"
- 09 "Symbol of Death"
- 10 "Incense of Forgetfulness"
- 11 "Human Bait"
- 12 "Ming the Merciless"
- 13 "The Miracle of Magic"
- 14 "A Beast at Bay"
- 15 "An Eye for an Eye"
