= Flash Gordon (1996 TV series) =

Animated superhero television series

- DVD cover of pilot movie
- Genre: Superhero
- Based on: Flash Gordon by Alex Raymond
- Developed by: David J. Corbett; Garfield Reeves-Stevens; Judith Reeves-Stevens
- Directed by: Norman Leblanc; Eric Berthier
- Voices of: Toby Proctor; Lexa Doig; Paul Shaffer
- Composer: Edmund Eagan
- Countries of origin: United States; France; Canada
- No. of episodes: 26

Production
- Executive producers: Carol Monroe; David J. Corbett; Michel L. Lemire; Sheldon Weisman; Claude Carrere; Leon Perahia
- Producer: Gerald Tripp
- Running time: 30 minutes
- Production companies: Lacewood Productions; Editions Dupuis France; Carrere Television; Mediatoon; Hearst Entertainment

Original release
- Network: Syndication (USA); YTV (Canada); France 3, Canal+ and Canal J (France)
- Release: September 1996 – 1997

Flash Gordon is a 1996 animated television series based on the sci-fi comic strip of the same name. The character, who had been around in the comics pages since Alex Raymond created him in 1934, had recently starred in several film serials, a 1980 feature film, and two earlier cartoon series — The New Adventures of Flash Gordon and Defenders of the Earth. 26 episodes were produced.

== Synopsis ==
In the series, the dashing blond hero was regressed to his teenage days, and he employed a hoverboard. As in previous versions, Flash teamed up with Dale Arden (also a teenager) and balding, bespectacled scientist Hans Zarkov. Both Flash and Dale are children of United States Air Force personnel. Flash's parents were American astronauts who were in space during Ming the Merciless’ initial assault on Earth, and barely escaped his dimensional wormhole and the "space torpedoes" used by Ming's forces.

The trans-dimensional portal was placed there by Ming the Merciless, the despotic emperor of the planet Mongo, who hoped to provide open access for his invading armies. In this series, Ming had reptilian humanoid characteristics, and seemed to have a human wife, who was long dead (it was implied in some episodes that she had gone to Earth).

When the Airforce escort sent to bring Flash and Dale to a secure location is knocked unconscious mid-flight, Dale and Flash manage to crash land the small aircraft they are on board in a marshy area with no one hurt in the crash. Flash and Dale set out to find help for the pilot and come across the laboratory of Dr. Zarkov. Zarkov mistakes them for two crew members that were supposed to bring him an important piece of his near completed inter dimensional rocket craft.

Flash and Dale unknowingly are brought along for the experiment and by the time anyone realizes the mistake it is too late. The three are brought aboard Ming's ship. Once there they become aware of Ming's plans, and Ming takes a dislike to Flash immediately. With help from Ming's daughter Princess Aura, the three earthlings manage to free a child prisoner of Ming's, escape and destroy his portal generator, closing the wormhole to Earth.

Without the part Zarkov was expecting, and with the portal closed, Flash and crew were stuck on the Mongo side. The rest of the show follows the earthlings adventures as they discover other nearby planets with anti-Ming factions and put together a loose coalition, determined to overthrow Mongo's evil emperor and return Princess Thundar, Flash, Dale, and Zarkov to their native planets and restore Mongo to independence and freedom from Ming's cruelty.

== Characters ==
- Alex "Flash" Gordon: The blond, teenage hero of the series. He is charismatic, daring, and always ready to impress Dale Arden (which doesn't always succeed). He met Dale during a skateboard contest, shortly before Ming's army attempted its first invasion on Earth. The name "Alex" is specific to this version.
- Dale Arden: Flash's dark-haired love interest, she is far removed from the original damsel in distress, being on the contrary courageous and sarcastic. She does have feelings for Flash, but also tends to refuse him just as much when things don't go her way. Like Flash, she is quite adept at skateboarding.
- Doctor Hans Zarkov: Flash and Dale's elderly, balding scientist ally. He met the pair during Ming's first invasion attempt of Earth and traveled with them to Mongo as part of his own experiments before being stuck after they destroyed the portal. Zarkov is brilliant, but extremely pessimistic and cowardly. He is normally unwilling to put himself in danger, no matter what. He is in direct rivalry with Sulpha, Ming's head scientist.
- Ming the Merciless: The militant ruler of Mongo, he supposedly has recently conquered many neighbor worlds, and now wants to invade Earth. Ming bears reptilian characteristics, just like the rest of his army, and whether or not his species was a native species to Mongo is unclear. His ruthless temper contrasts with his unconditional love for his daughter Aura. He once had a wife named Rosaura, supposedly dead since long ago.
- Princess Aura: Ming's teenage daughter who is a human hybrid. Unlike her father, Aura is more sympathetic to the people of Mongo's plight and goes out of her way to help Flash and his friends, but will not engage in any treason against Ming. Despite Ming's dissatisfaction in how Aura does not follow his example of being deceitful and manipulative, Aura is very good at playing people for her own needs.
- General Lynch: Ming's sniveling, incompetent second-in-command. Lynch doesn't have much to explain in Ming's decisions, and just carries out the orders, attempting to have the job done by brute force and failing most of the time. Still, he is no less evil than his Emperor, and if Ming was not here, his schemes would be just as bad, if not worse.
- Kobalt: Ming's top mercenary, Kobalt is a Pantheron. He has a sort of rivalry with Lynch.
- Sulpha: Ming's female Dragon head scientist, charged with designing his weapons and ships. She is fully brilliant due to a binary brain, and is in a fierce rivalry with Doctor Zarkov for being the greatest scientist on Mongo. Sulpha is the last of her species, which was more than likely exterminated by Ming. She has a soft side in spite of her grumpy demeanor, with arguable loyalties, serving Ming but all the same hating him, and often helping out Flash and his allies when they're in a pinch.
- Talon: Flash' most prominent and gung-ho ally and Prince of the Birdmen of Hawk City, a species of winged human-like beings. Talon is a brave and enthusiastic man.
- Thundar: Another one of Flash' loyal allies, Thundar is a female Lionid, coming from a species of felinoids. She is an impetuous and excellent fighter, expert at hand-to-hand combat. She is based on Prince Thun of the Lion People from previous versions.
- Prince Barin: Renegade Prince of Arboria, first hostile to Flash and his friends. He nonetheless ends up joining them in their battle against Ming.

== Production and series run ==
A multinational co-production, Flash Gordon came into weekly YTV, syndication and Channel 4 and TCC in Fall 1996.

== Cast ==
Voice talent:

- Lawrence Bayne as Prince Barin, General Arden, Chump
- Tyrone Benskin as Kobalt
- Dana Brooks as Sulpha
- Rob Cowan as Prince Harek
- Lexa Doig as Dale Arden
- Shirley Douglas as Queen Kayla
- Allegra Fulton as Queen Mardana
- Tracey Hoyt as Princess Aura
- Lorne Kennedy as Ming The Merciless, Ijad
- Ray Landry as General Lynch, Frank Gordon
- Julie Lemieux as Catherine Gordon
- Marjorie Malpass as Electra
- Andy Marshall as Prince Talon, King Vultan
- Toby Proctor as Flash Gordon
- Rino Romano as Jake
- Ron Rubin as Trog Queen
- Alison Sealy-Smith as Captain Valkyrie
- Paul Shaffer as Dr. Hans Zarkov
- Adrian Truss as Snurr
- Krista White as Thundar
- Lisa Yamanaka as Katie

== Episode list ==
No.	Title	Written by	Original release date	Prod. code
1	"Marooned on Mongo!"	Judith Reeves-Stevens & Garfield Reeves-Stevens	TBA	301
Earth teenagers Flash Gordon and Dale Arden, and their reluctant friend Dr. Zarkov, journey to the fantastic planet Mongo where they fight to defeat the evil planetary dictator, Ming the Merciless.
2	"Jaws of the Jungle!"	Judith Reeves-Stevens & Garfield Reeves-Stevens	TBA	302
Flash, Dale and Dr. Zarkov rescue the Lionid princess Thundar from Ming and the treacherous Vine People. This feat earns them the respect of Prince Talon and renews the rebellion against Ming.
3	"The Caves of Doom!"	Judith Reeves-Stevens & Garfield Reeves-Stevens	TBA	303
Flash races time to save Dale and Dr. Zarkov from being sacrificed to a volcano by the Trogs, a tribe of suspicious cave dwellers.
4	"Vandals from the Void!"	Alan Swayze, Judith Reeves-Stevens & Garfield Reeves-Stevens	TBA	304
When Mongo is attacked by a fleet of UFOs, only Flash questions Ming's attempts to form an alliance with the Rebel forces.
5	"Fangs of Fury!"	Alan Templeton and Mary Crawford	TBA	305
Thundar's mother falls fatally ill, and only Ming holds the antidote. His price for the cure is Flash Gordon and Thundar is forced to decide.
6	"Terror Beneath the Waves!"	Gerald Sanford	TBA	306
Queen Kayla and her Shark People hold Flash captive underwater while Ming prepares a sneak attack on the Rebel forces.
7	"Wings of Destruction!"	Story by: Alan Templeton, Mary Crawford, Judith Reeves-Stevens & Garfield Reeves-Stevens; Teleplay by: Judith Reeves-Stevens & Garfield Reeves-Stevens	TBA	307
Flash competes against Aura in the Mongonian Aerial Games. Although a truce is in effect during the games, Ming attacks.
8	"The Invisible Claw!"	Alan Templeton, Mary Crawford, Judith Reeves-Stevens & Garfield Reeves-Stevens	TBA	308
Sulpha, Ming's dragon scientist, creates an army of invisible Rock People to conquer a peaceful desert kingdom.
9	"The Pit of the Tigrons!"	Alison Lea Bingeman	TBA	309
While Ming is away, Aura takes command of Mongo. She offers a truce if Flash will agree to marry her and rule Mongo at her side.
10	"Cry of the Pantheron!"	Gerald Sanford	TBA	310
Kobalt the mercenary pretends to fall in love with Thundar, raising Flash's suspicions when he joins an attack on Ming's bomb factory.
11	"The Dragon Strikes!"	Mary Crawford & Alan Templeton	TBA	311
Flash, Dale and Dr. Zarkov discover Mongo's legendary lost Hall of the dragons. Surprisingly, Sulpha helps keep the secret from Ming.
12	"The Wrath of Ming!"	Hope Liebowitz	TBA	312
Believing that Ming has lost his mind, Aura and Kayla hatch separate plots to overthrow Ming and take the throne of Mongo.
13	"Rocket to Oblivion!"	Judith Reeves-Stevens & Garfield Reeves-Stevens	TBA	313
Flash, Dale and Dr. Zarkov set off for Earth in an experimental space ship, unaware that Sulpha has hidden a bomb in the ship.
14	"Ambush in Arboria!"	Judith Reeves-Stevens & Garfield Reeves-Stevens	TBA	314
Dale joins forces with one of Ming's loyal supporters, handsome Prince Barin of Arboria, supposedly betraying Flash and the rebel forces.
15	"Moon of Mystery!"	Mary Crawford & Alan Templeton	TBA	315
Flash and Aura form an uneasy alliance to protect the peaceful inhabitants of a previously undiscovered moon from Ming's wrath.
16	"Revenge of the Dragon!"	Gerald Sanford	TBA	316
Sulpha finds a cache of what seem to be dragon eggs, and asks Flash to stall Ming while she searches for the secret to her lost race.
17	"The Fiendish Experiment!"	Alan Swayze	TBA	317
Zarkov literally loses his mind in a dangerous Dynacrystal experiment, enabling Ming to lure Flash and Dale into a deadly trap.
18	"Dungeons of Despair!"	Alan Swayze	TBA	318
Ming throws Lynch in jail, but his replacement performs so well that Flash, Aura and Barin trick Ming getting Lynch back.
19	"Treasure of the Depths!"	Gerald Sanford	TBA	319
Talon discovers Ming's powerful energy source, a priceless hoard of Dynacrystals hidden deep in a mountain lake.
20	"The Fortress of Fear!"	Alan Templeton & Mary Crawford	TBA	320
Ming prepares to attack King Vultan of the Hawk People. It's up to Flash and Talon to keep Hawk City from being blown from the sky.
21	"Palace of Peril!"	Alan Swayze	TBA	321
Ming's Imperial Palace becomes a battleground when Flash reprograms a factory to turn out Rock Warriors with minds of their own.
22	"Shadow of the Shark!"	Alison Lea Bingeman	TBA	322
Ming's plan to invade Earth threatens Kayla's underwater kingdom. Flash must prevent a war between them before it destroys Mongo.
23	"Double Disaster!"	Hope Liebowitz	TBA	323
Flash shoots down Ming's Megaraptor with Ming himself aboard, but the mysterious double of Ming takes his throne.
24	"The Fur Flies!"	Alan Swayze	TBA	324
When Ming fires Kobalt, the Pantheron mercenary goes into business for himself, posing a threat to a secret Rebel mission.
25	"Enemy Ming!"	Alan Swayze	TBA	325
When Aura, Ming and Flash crash land on a barren moon, they must work together to against space squids.
26	"Escape to Earth!"	Judith Reeves-Stevens & Garfield Reeves-Stevens	TBA	326
Earth is placed in jeopardy when Flash and Dale's parents attempt to rescue their children by reopening the black hole doorway.
