= Austin Briggs =

American cartoonist

- Born: September 8, 1908 Humboldt, Minnesota
- Died: October 10, 1973 (aged 65) Paris, France
- Areas: Illustrator, Cartoonist

Austin Briggs (September 8, 1908 – October 10, 1973) was a cartoonist and illustrator. He was born in Humboldt, Minnesota, and grew up in Detroit, Michigan, before moving to New York City as a teenager. After working for a while at an advertising agency, he began providing illustrations for the "upmarket" pulp magazine Blue Book. Briggs later became an assistant to the cartoonist Alex Raymond on Flash Gordon and succeeded him on Secret Agent Corrigan. In 1940, he drew a Flash Gordon daily strip which he stayed on until about 1944; he moved on to creating illustrations for books and magazines such as Reader's Digest and The Saturday Evening Post. He was one of the founding faculty for the Famous Artists School.

In 1969, he was elected to the Society of Illustrators' Hall of Fame.

Briggs died from leukemia in Paris, where he had retired.
