= Princess Aura =

Fictional character appearing in Flash Gordon

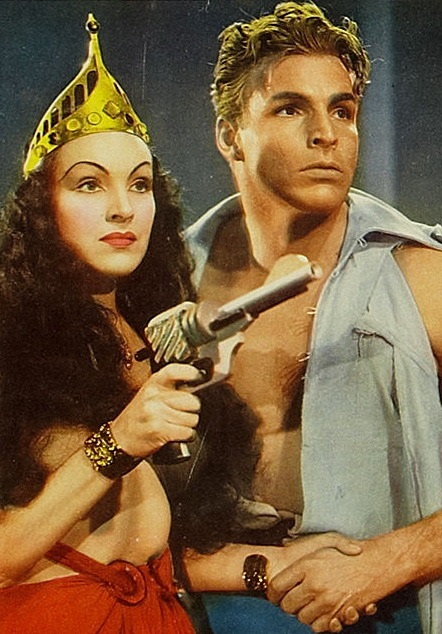
- Priscilla Lawson and Buster Crabbe as Princess Aura and Flash Gordon in Flash Gordon (1936)

Publication information
- Publisher: King Features Syndicate
- First appearance: Flash Gordon (1936)
- First comic appearance: Flash Gordon (1934) (installment 4)
- Created by: Alex Raymond

In-story information
- Place of origin: Mongo

Princess Aura is a fictional character in the Flash Gordon comic strips and serials. She is the selfish daughter of Ming the Merciless, the evil ruler of the planet Mongo and Emperor of the Universe. First appearing in the original 1934 Flash Gordon comic strip, Aura falls in love with Flash Gordon on sight, but is ultimately unable to seduce him away from Dale Arden. In various adaptations, her character ranges from villainous to sympathetic, often defying her father.

Aura has been portrayed by various actresses in the many Flash Gordon adaptations in film and television, including Priscilla Lawson in the 1936 serial film, Shirley Deane in the 1940 serial film Flash Gordon Conquers the Universe, Ornella Muti in the 1980 feature film adaptation, and Anna Van Hooft in the 2007 television series.

== Character overview ==
Aura is the daughter of the series' villain, Ming the Merciless, but saves Flash Gordon from execution by her father. She soon realizes that her love for Flash is unrequited, and later falls in love with Prince Barin, the rightful heir to the throne of Mongo. She and Barin are eventually banished to the forest world of Arboria.

Promotional material for the 1934 Flash Gordon comic strip described the character:

Beautiful but pitiless! Aura, exotic princess of a weird new planet! She had never seen a human being from our own Earth until Flash Gordon crashed in a giant rocket-plane on the strange new world where she lived. Now she has set her heart on winning Flash's love!

In the first serial, "On the Planet Mongo" (1934), Aura witnesses Flash's victory in the gladiatorial arena and immediately saves him from execution by her father by helping him escape. Though Ming explains to Dale Arden that his subjects on Mongo "possess none of the human traits of kindness, mercy or pity" and are "coldly scientific and ruthless", Aura claims to love Flash and refuses to tell Ming where she has hidden him.

== Appearances ==
=== Comic strips ===
Princess Aura first appears in the fourth installment of the 1934 Flash Gordon comic strip serial "On the Planet Mongo". On Mongo, the evil Emperor of the Universe is shocked when Flash defeats his Monkey Men in the gladiatorial arena, and sentences Flash to death. The Emperor's daughter, Princess Aura, promptly declares "Stop! Stop, I say! If you kill this man, you must also kill me!", and then helps Flash escape. She locks him in a spaceship against his will, hoping to keep him there until her father marries Dale by force, and Aura can have Flash for herself. Aura subsequently refuses to tell the Emperor where Flash is, insisting that she loves him. Aura later helps Flash escape the Shark Men, but knocks him unconscious so he cannot interfere with the Shark Men returning Dale to Ming.

Aura ultimately finds that she cannot seduce Flash away from Dale, and later falls in love with Barin and marries him.

=== Film ===
Max von Sydow as Ming the Merciless and Ornella Muti as Princess Aura in the 1980 film Flash Gordon.

In 1936, Aura was portrayed by Priscilla Lawson in the Flash Gordon film serial. In 1940, the role was portrayed by Shirley Deane in the third Flash Gordon serial, Flash Gordon Conquers the Universe.

Aura was portrayed by Ornella Muti in the 1980 film Flash Gordon, produced by Dino De Laurentiis, and has been described as seductive and scheming. Muti said of the character, "Aura redeems herself. She cries and admits her errors—a very 'human' woman, aside from being incredibly sensual." In the film, Aura saves Flash from death with the help of one of her lovers, a royal doctor who revives Flash after Ming tries executing him in a gas chamber. She withstands torture rather than reveal Flash's location, but eventually breaks. Furious that Ming allowed her to be tortured, Aura turns against him and helps Flash and his friends defeat him.

=== Television ===
Melendy Britt provided the voice of Princess Aura in the 1979 Filmation animated series. As Ming's daughter, she initially assists her father in battling Flash and his allies, but later turns against him and joins the rebel forces of Mongo. Aura also has an elite guard of female warriors under her command, known as the Witch-Women. Aura initially resents Dale Arden and rejects Prince Barin's affections, but would become the former's friend and the latter's love interest as the series progressed. Consequently, her attraction to Flash is downplayed and does not resurface after her desertion of her father.

In the 1996 Flash Gordon animated series, Aura is a sympathetic character, who often defies her father because of her attraction to Flash, or for the sake of her mother. In this version, Aura has green skin, but is otherwise perfectly human, even though her father Ming is reptilian. She is voiced by Tracey Hoyt.

Anna Van Hooft portrayed Aura in the 2007 Flash Gordon television series. She is once again portrayed as a sympathetic character. Unlike the comic, she has a brother and her mother is alive. She vainly seeks her father's approval, but Ming, like most other characters on the show, regards her with contempt. She also is in love with Flash, and has a rivalry with Dale, who looks down on her as a "little brat" and treats her like a child.
