= Dale Arden =

Fictional character appearing in Flash Gordon

- Melody Anderson as Dale Arden in the 1980 film Flash Gordon.

Publication information
- Publisher: King Features Syndicate
- First appearance: Flash Gordon comic strip; (January 7, 1934)
- Created by: Alex Raymond

In-story information
- Supporting character of: Flash Gordon

Dale Arden is a fictional character, the fellow adventurer and love interest of Flash Gordon. She was created by Alex Raymond and is a prototypical heroine for later female characters, including Princess Leia and Padmé Amidala in Star Wars. Flash, Dale and Dr. Hans Zarkov fight together against Ming the Merciless.

== Profile ==
Dale is Flash Gordon's constant companion in his adventures, as well as his one true love. The emperor Ming the Merciless is immediately attracted to her and the early strips were essentially based on Flash's heroic efforts to rescue Dale from Ming's many attempts to marry her.

Filmation's Flash Gordon's bible portrayed Dale Arden as follows:

All errant knights have their true love, and in Flash's case it's Dale – beautiful, independent and capable. In most circumstances, Dale is well able to take care of herself and is an ideal companion for the adventuring Flash. Which is not to say that she is unfeminine. Ming was only the first of Mongo's heroic – though, in his case, absolutely evil – rulers who have sought Dale Arden as their Queen. Dale is sensitive, warm and compassionate – traits which occasionally lead her to trust the wrong person. Where Flash would gladly lay down his life to save her, Dale would do likewise. And the two of them, united, can face any peril that Mongo has to offer.

== Alex Raymond's comic strip ==
Dale Arden is introduced in the first Flash Gordon story, July 7, 1934, as simply "a passenger" on the plane Flash is flying on. After the plane is hit by a meteor, Flash saves Dale by parachuting to the ground. The two are then abducted by Dr. Zarkov, who takes them on his rocket to the planet Mongo. In the 1930s comic strips, Dale often comes into conflict with other female characters who desire Flash romantically (such as Princess Aura and Queen Azura).

== Comic books ==
In the 2011 Dynamite Comics Flash Gordon: Zeitgeist, Dale Arden is a cartographer and researcher for the State Department in 1934. As in Raymond's original story, she and Flash are abducted by Zarkov and brought to Mongo. In the later Dynamite Comics Flash Gordon series, Dale Arden is a modern-day science journalist with a special interest in the space program, as well as a feminist. She travels with Zarkov and Flash on the former's Z-Plane to Mongo.

== In other media ==
- Dale's broadcast debut was in a Hearst Radio series that ran from April to October 1935. The actress who played her is unknown.
- Dale was first portrayed on film by Jean Rogers in the film serials Flash Gordon (1936) and Flash Gordon's Trip to Mars (1938).
- In the 1940 serial, Flash Gordon Conquers the Universe, Dale was portrayed by Carol Hughes.
- Irene Champlin took the role for the 1954 Flash Gordon television series. Champlin was praised for transforming Arden from the typical damsel in distress of the serials into a trained scientist and a "quick thinker who often saved [Flash and Zarkov] from perishing".
- Meltem Mete portrayed Dale in the 1967 Turkish film Flash Gordon's Battle in Space (AKA Baytekin – Fezada Çarpisanlar in Turkish). Here Dale is depicted as a spy who helps Flash.
- Diane Pershing provided the voice for the character in the 1979 Filmation series. Filmation's version of the character was a newspaper reporter.
- In 1980, Dale was portrayed by Melody Anderson in the film Flash Gordon, produced by Dino De Laurentiis. In this version of the story, Dale is a New York travel agent.
- During the course of the 1980s Marvel animated series Defenders of the Earth, Dale is captured and killed by Ming, but her consciousness is left trapped inside a crystal Flash uses to power the Defenders' base on Earth, Monitor. Dale is reborn as the heart of the base, Dynak. This version has blonde hair rather than black.
- Lexa Doig voiced Dale in the 1996 animated series Flash Gordon.
- Gina Holden portrayed Dale in the 2007 Flash Gordon television series.

== Parodies ==
- In the 1974 adult film spoof Flesh Gordon, the character is renamed Dale Ardor and is portrayed by Cindy Hopkins, a.k.a. Suzanne Fields.
