= Hans Zarkov =

Fictional character appearing in Flash Gordon

Publication information
- Publisher: King Features Syndicate
- First appearance: Flash Gordon comic strip; (January 7, 1934)
- Created by: Alex Raymond

In-story information
- Supporting character of: Flash Gordon

Dr. Hans Zarkov is a fictional character appearing in the Flash Gordon comic strip and the following serials, films, television shows and comic books. He was created by Alex Raymond.

Zarkov is a brilliant scientist who creates a rocket and forces Flash and Dale Arden to come with him to the planet Mongo, and fight against Ming the Merciless. In the original comic strip, he was first thought to have died when his ship crashed into the planet Mongo. It is later revealed that Ming's minions pulled him out of the wreckage. Zarkov's character in the 1980s DC comic was handled the same way.

== Alex Raymond's comic strip ==
In the first Flash Gordon storyline, Zarkov discovers the Earth is endangered by an impending collision with the planet Mongo. Discovering Flash and Dale near his laboratory, he abducts them at gunpoint and forces them into his spacecraft, which he then launches at the planet Mongo. By the second storyline in the strip, Zarkov becomes a more sympathetic character who works with the heroes to become a regular companion.

== Comic books ==
The 1996 Flash Gordon comic book published by King Features has Zarkov perform his traditional role of assisting Flash in his adventures. It also resolves the discrepancy in the serials about Zarkov's first name, by giving the character's full name as Hans Alexis Zarkov. In the 2011 Dynamite Comics comic Flash Gordon: Zeitgeist, Doctor Hans Zarkov is a Russian émigré, suffering from clinical paranoia, living in Switzerland. He abducts Flash and Dale and takes them to Mongo on board his rocket, here named Copernicus.

== In other media ==
Zarkov was first portrayed in the Flash Gordon film serials by Frank Shannon. He is identified as "Alexis Zarkov" in the 1938 serial Flash Gordon's Trip to Mars.

The character was portrayed by Joseph Nash in the 1954 Flash Gordon TV series.

In 1977, Zarkov appeared as a scientist bent on saving the Earth and introducing immense alien powers to the Earth in the Super Friends season 2 episode 11 titled "Forbidden Powers." In this episode, Flash Gordon and Dale Arden are replaced by Batman and Wonder Woman who journey to space in order to rescue Zarkov and his assistant. The assistant is kidnapped much like he attempted to do to Munson in the 1980 Flash Gordon film.

Alan Oppenheimer provided the voice for the character in the 1979 Filmation animated series. The issue of Zarkov forcing the heroes to accompany him to Mongo is avoided by changing the story by having Flash and Dale come to his underground laboratory during a dangerous meteor shower that sets off a deadly volcanic eruption that traps the visitors even as it threatens to kill them. Thus Zarkov's rocket is the only means to escape certain death and they board willingly. After which, Zarkov apologizes that he cannot drop the pair off before continuing to Mongo and they immediately agree to help him once he explains his mission.

In 1980, Chaim Topol (billed only as "Topol") portrayed the character in the film Flash Gordon produced by Dino De Laurentiis. This version of Zarkov is a former NASA scientist, who was fired and dismissed because of his "mad" theories about an alien attack on Earth. After capturing him, Ming reveals the only reason the Earth is being destroyed is because Zarkov recognised the catastrophes as a deliberate attack. The quick flashbacks during his memory wipe scene revealed some further information about his past. He is Jewish and was born in Eastern Europe. His family moved to the United States fleeing from the Holocaust. Zarkov worked in the United States space program (including the Apollo program), before being removed. Also, at one point in his life he had a wife, who died by drowning in a pool. He is able to nullify the memory wipe by remembering all he can (songs by the Beatles, texts by William Shakespeare, formulas by Albert Einstein, and his recitation of the Talmud) during the process, giving it too much to process and essentially "jamming" it.

Paul Shaffer is the voice of Dr. Hans Zarkov in the 1996 animated series.

Jody Racicot portrayed the character in the 2007 Flash Gordon television series. He assists Flash, Dale, and Baylin by monitoring rifts that open. He seems very nervous constantly and Baylin describes as a "strange, fidgety little man". His nervous attitude came from the fact that after Doctor Gordon disappeared in the rift experiment, he was hounded by FBI agents to cover up the truth.
