= 1935 in comics =

Notable events of 1935 in comics.

== Events and publications ==
=== January ===
- Famous Funnies #6 - Eastern Color

=== February ===
- February 17: Stephen Slesinger's King of the Royal Mounted makes its debut.
- February 23: First issue of the Italian comics magazine Intrepido is published. It will run until January 1998.
- February 23: Marjorie Henderson Buell's Little Lulu makes its debut.
- Famous Funnies #7 - Eastern Color
- New Fun Comics (1935 series) #1 - National Allied Publications - The first comic book with all original material rather than comic-strip reprints as well as the first comic book published by the company that would become DC.

=== March ===
- March 10: Bill Holman's Smokey Stover makes its debut. It will run until 1973.
- March 17: Clara Cluck debuts in comics in a Sunday table by Al Taliaferro.
- March 11: Stephen Dowling and Frank Dowling's Ruggles makes its debut. It will run until 3 August 1957.
- Famous Funnies #8 - Eastern Color
- New Fun Comics (1935 series) #2 - National Allied Publications

=== April ===
- April 7 - June 23: Dr. Seuss' Hejji is published as a newspaper comic.
- Famous Funnies #9 - Eastern Color
- New Fun Comics (1935 series) #3 - National Allied Publications

=== May ===
- Famous Funnies #10 - Eastern Color
- New Fun Comics (1935 series) #4 - National Allied Publications

=== June ===
- June 17: Ralph Fuller's Oaky Doaks makes its debut.
- June 28: Mary Tourtel retires from drawing Rupert Bear. The comics series is continued by Alfred Bestall until 1965.
- Famous Funnies #11 - Eastern Color

=== July ===
- July 7: The final episode of Les Mystères Surrealistes de New York, a comic by Spanish surreal painter Salvador Dalí, is printed in The American Weekly.
- Famous Funnies #12 - Eastern Color

=== August ===
- August 4: The first episode of Mal Eaton's Peter Piltdown appears in print. The series will run until the artist's death in 1974.
- August 11: The first episode of Hector Brault's Casimir is published in Le Petit Journal.
- Famous Funnies #13 - Eastern Color
- New Fun Comics (1935 series) #5 - National Allied Publications

=== September ===
- September 30: The first episode of the Mickey Mouse story The Pirate Submarine is published in newspapers. The story is created by Floyd Gottfredson and Ted Osborne and features the debut of Dr. Vulter.
- Famous Funnies #14 - Eastern Color

=== October ===
- Famous Funnies #15 - Eastern Color
- New Fun Comics (1935 series) #6 - National Allied Publications

=== November ===
- The first episode of Joe Easley's Along the Iron Pike is published. It will run until November 1971.
- Famous Funnies #16 - Eastern Color

=== December ===
- Famous Funnies #17 - Eastern Color
- New Comics (1935 series) #1 - National Allied Newspaper Syndicate - The second comic book title published by the future DC; later renamed New Adventure Comics, and then simply Adventure Comics.
- American comics artist Billy Cam first publishes his popular newspaper comic strip CAMouFLAGES in Indonesian papers.

=== Specific date unknown ===
- Sigurd Lybeck and Anders Bjørgaard' Jens von Bustenskjold makes its debut.
- Haaken Christensen creates Brumle, which will run until 1956.
- In Thailand, Wittamin creates the comics series LingGee, which plagiarizes both Mickey Mouse and Popeye.

== Births ==
=== February ===
- February 1: Keith Watson, British comics artist (Dan Dare, Roel Dijkstra), (d. 1994).

=== July ===
- July 5: Ploeg, Belgian cartoonist and comic artist (Prosper), (d. 2021).
- July 13: Kurt Westergaard, Danish cartoonist (Jyllands-Posten Muhammad cartoons controversy), (d. 2021).

=== December ===
- December 2: Dick Guindon, American cartoonist, (d. 2022).

== Deaths ==
=== January ===
- January 4: Daniël Hoeksema, Dutch comics artist and illustrator (De Neef van Prikkebeen), dies at age 65.

=== February ===
- February 1: Fernand Wicheler, Belgian playwright, actor, journalist and comics artist (Le Dernier Film), dies at age 60.

=== March ===
- March 26: Eugene Zimmerman, Swiss-American illustrator, comics artist and cartoonist, dies at age 72.

=== April ===
- April 2: Henri Avelot, French illustrator, caricaturist and comics artist (Philibert, continued Bécassine), dies at age 62.

=== June ===
- June 15: Gaar Williams, American political cartoonist and comic artist (Zipper, A Strain on the Family Tie, Mort Green and Wife), dies at age 54.

=== October ===
- October 15:
  - Paul Kroesen, American illustrator and comics artist (The Romance of America, The Life of Christ), dies at age 34 from bronchial pneumonia.
  - Georges Tiret-Bognet, French illustrator and comics artist, dies at age 80.
- October 20: Sidney Smith, American comics artist (The Gumps, Old Doc Yak, Ching Chow), dies at age 58 in a car accident.
- October 21: Joseph Charlebois, Canadian comics artist (Père Ladébauche), dies at age 63.

=== November ===
- November 27: Fred Leipziger, Swedish-American comics artist (Doings of the Van Loons), dies at age 55.

=== December ===
- December 25: Ed Mack, American comics artist (Sime the Simp, continued Mutt and Jeff), dies at age 64.

== First issues by title ==
- New Fun Comics (February, National Allied Publications)
- New Comics (December, National Allied Newspaper Syndicate)

== Initial appearances by character name ==
- Doctor Occult New Fun #6 - October, published by National Allied Newspaper Syndicate.
- Rose Psychic New Fun #6 - October, published by National Allied Newspaper Syndicate.
