= Zábranský =

Zábranský (feminine: Zábranská) is a Czech surname. Notable people with the surname include:

- Adolf Zábranský (1909–1981), Czech illustrator and painter
- David Zábranský (born 1977), Czech writer
- Jared Zabransky (born 1983), American football player
- Libor Zábranský (ice hockey, born 1973), Czech ice hockey player
- Libor Zábranský (ice hockey, born 2000), Czech ice hockey player
- Vlastimil Zábranský (1936–2021), Czech visual artist
