= 1936 in comics =

Notable events of 1936 in comics.

== Events and publications ==
=== January ===
- January 19: Hergé's The Adventures of Jo, Zette and Jocko (1936-1957) debuts in Cœurs Vaillants.
- Famous Funnies #18 - Eastern Color
- More Fun the Big Comic Magazine (previously New Fun Comics) (1935 series) #7 - National Periodical Publications
- New Comics (1935 series) #2 - National Periodical Publications
- The Mickey Mouse comic strip adventure Mickey’s rival by Floyd Gottfredson runs in newspapers (Sunday tables). It marks the debut of Mortimer Mouse, five months in advance on his first appearance on the big screen.

=== February ===
- 8 February: The first issue of Mickey Mouse Weekly (1936-1957) is published.
- 17 February: Lee Falk's The Phantom makes his debut.
- Famous Funnies #19 - Eastern Color
- More Fun the Big Comic Magazine (1935 series) #8 - National Periodical Publications
- New Comics (1935 series) #3 - National Periodical Publications
- Popular Comics #1 - Dell Comics

=== March ===
- March 8: Dudley D. Watkins' Oor Wullie and The Broons debut in The Sunday Post.
- March 16: In E.C. Segar's Thimble Theatre Eugene the Jeep makes its debut.
- March 31: Frans Piët signs his first Sjors comic strip. Originally a blatant copy of Martin Branner's Winnie Winkle it now becomes completely its own thing.
- Big Book of Fun Comics (1936 series) #1 - National Periodical Publications
- Famous Funnies #20 - Eastern Color
- More Fun Comics (previously More Fun the Big Comic Magazine) (1935 series) #9 - National Periodical Publications, cover dated "Mar-April"
- New Comics (1935 series) #4 - National Periodical Publications, cover dated "Mar-April".
- Popular Comics #2 - Dell Comics

=== April ===
- April 6: Lank Leonard's Mickey Finn (1936-1976) debuts.
- Famous Funnies #21 - Eastern Color
- King Comics #1 - David McKay Publications
- Popular Comics #3 - Dell Comics
- Tip Top Comics #1 - United Features: first comic book appearance of Tarzan

=== May ===
- May 2: In the first issue of the Turkish children's magazine Yavrutürk Çocuk Gazetesi Ercüment Kalmik's comics series Çetin Kaptan makes its debut.
- May 3: The first issue of the Flemish comics magazine Bravo ! is published. It will run until 17 April 1951. In its first issue, Frits Van den Berghe's gag comic Pikkel en Duim makes its debut.
- May 7: The first issue of the Dutch comics magazine Doe Mee is published. It will run until 15 December 1949.
- May 15: A longer narrative unfolds in the otherwise gag-a-day comic Krazy Kat by George Herriman, lasting nearly 10 months, until 17 March 1937. Fans will later name this storyline the Tiger Tea story.
- Famous Funnies #22 - Eastern Color
- King Comics #2 - David McKay Publications
- More Fun Comics (1935 series) #10 - National Periodical Publications
- Popular Comics #4 - Dell Comics
- The Comics Magazine (Funny Pages) (1936 series) #1 — Centaur Publications

=== June ===
- June 5: In the Flemish comic magazine Bravo!, Frits Van den Berghe starts illustrating the comic series Edmund Bell, scripted by John Flanders, A.K.A. Jean Ray.
- June 10: The final episode of the gag comic Van Boring, by future animation legend Frank Tashlin, is published.
- Famous Funnies #23 - Eastern Color
- King Comics #3 - David McKay Publications
- New Comics (1935 series) #5 - National Periodical Publications
- Popular Comics #5 - Dell Comics
- The Comics Magazine (Funny Pages) (1936 series) #2 - Centaur Publications
- Tip Top Comics #2 - United Features
- Phantom comic #1

=== July ===
- July 11: The final issue of the Dutch satirical magazine De Notenkraker is published.
- 14 July: The Italian humor magazine Bertoldo brings out its first issue, continuing its run until 10 September 1943.
- Famous Funnies #24 - Eastern Color
- King Comics #4 - David McKay Publications
- More Fun Comics (1935 series) #11 - National Periodical Publications
- New Comics (1935 series) #6 - National Periodical Publications
- Popular Comics #6 - Dell Comics - Debut of Sheldon Mayer's Scribbly the Boy Cartoonist.
- The Comics Magazine (Funny Pages) (1936 series) #3 — Centaur Publications
- Tip Top Comics #3 - United Features

=== August ===
- August 30: Al Taliaferro and Earl Duvall adapt Donald Duck into a weekly pantomime comic, as part of their Silly Symphony comic strip.
- August 31: William St. John Glenn creates Dorothea in The Daily Mail.
- Max Plaisted's Zarnak makes its debut. It will run until October 1937.
- Famous Funnies #25 - Eastern Color
- King Comics #5 - David McKay Publications
- More Fun Comics (1935 series) #12 - National Periodical Publications
- New Comics (1935 series) #7 - National Periodical Publications
- Popular Comics #7 - Dell Comics
- The Comics Magazine (Funny Pages) (1936 series) #4 — Centaur Publications
- Tip Top Comics #4 - United Features

=== September ===
- Famous Funnies #26 - Eastern Color
- King Comics #6 - David McKay Publications
- More Fun Comics (1935 series) #13 - National Periodical Publications
- New Comics (1935 series) #8 - National Periodical Publications
- Popular Comics #8 - Dell Comics
- The Comics Magazine (Funny Pages) (1936 series) #5 — Centaur Publications
- Tip Top Comics #5 - United Features

=== October ===
- October 25: The final episode of Rea Irvin's The Smythes is published in The New York Herald Tribune.
- The first episode of Fuku-Chan by Ryuichi Yokoyama is published and will run until 1971.
- Famous Funnies #27 - Eastern Color
- The Funnies #1 - Dell Comics
- King Comics #7 - David McKay Publications
- More Fun Comics (1935 series) #14 - National Periodical Publications
- New Comics (1935 series) #9 - National Periodical Publications
- Popular Comics #9 - Dell Comics
- Tip Top Comics #6 - United Features

=== November ===
- November 30: The first episode of the Mickey Mouse story Island in the sky, by Floyd Gottfredson and Ted Osborne is published, which marks the debut of Doctor Einmug.
- November: Centaur Publications changes the name of The Comics Magazine to Funny Pages starting with issue #6.
- Famous Funnies #28 - Eastern Color
- The Funnies #2 - Dell Comics
- Funny Pages (1936 series) #6 — Centaur Publications
- Funny Picture Stories (1936 series) #1 — Centaur Publications. This issue also marks the debut of The Clock by George Brenner.
- King Comics #8 - David McKay Publications
- More Fun Comics (1935 series) #15 - National Periodical Publications
- New Comics (1935 series) #10 - National Periodical Publications
- Popular Comics #10 - Dell Comics
- Elmer Woggon and Allen Saunders's Steve Roper and Mike Nomad (1936-2004) debuts.
- Tip Top Comics #7 - United Features

=== December ===
- December 14: The first episode of Harry S. Hall's News 'n' Nonsense (A.K.A. Sez Melinda) is published in The Toronto Telegram.
- Detective Picture Stories #1 — Centaur Publications
- Famous Funnies #29 - Eastern Color
- Flash Gordon Strange Adventure Magazine #1. It folds after only one issue.
- The Funnies #3 - Dell Comics
- Funny Pages (1936 series) #7 — Centaur Publications
- Funny Picture Stories (1936 series) #2 — Centaur Publications
- King Comics #9 - David McKay Publications
- More Fun Comics (1935 series) #16 - National Periodical Publications
- New Comics (1935 series) #11 - National Periodical Publications
- Popular Comics #11 - Dell Comics
- Tip Top Comics #8 - United Features

=== Specific date unknown ===
- Harry Paschall creates Bosco for Strength and Health magazine, where it will run until his death.
- Jerry Iger and Will Eisner establish the comics studio Eisner & Iger.
- Roberto Sgrilli's Formichino debuts.
- The final episode of Felix Hess' long-running comic series Uit Het Kladschrift van Jantje is published.

== Births ==
=== January ===
- January 5: Birago Balzano, Italian cartoonist (Zora), (d. 2022).

=== August ===
- August 11: Mitsutoshi Furuya, Japanese comic artist (Dame Oyaji, Bar Lemon Heart), (d. 2021).

=== September ===
- September 2: Vlastimil Zábranský, Czech painter, visual artist and comics artist, (d. 2021).

=== November ===
- November 3: Takao Saito, Japanese comics/manga artist (Golgo 13, Kage Gari, Barom-1), (d. 2021).

== Deaths ==
=== January ===
- January 31: Grace Drayton, American illustrator and comics artist (Dolly Dimples, The Pussycat Princess), dies at age 58.

=== March ===
- March 19: Ottilia Adelborg, Swedish illustrator and comics artist, dies at age 80.

=== April ===
- April 2: Bert Cobb, American comics artist (Jocko the Educated Monk, Some Monkey Fun From Jungle Jinks, Stumble-Toe Joe, Ambitious Teddy, Meddlesome Millie), dies at age 66 or 67.

=== May ===
- May 5: James Francis Sullivan, British illustrator and comics artist (The British Working Man, The Queer Side of Things), dies at age 83.
- May 9 : Stanislav Lolek, Czech illustrator and comics artist (The Cunning Little Vixen or Vixen Sharp Ears) dies at age 62.

=== July ===
- July 3: Charles Reese, American comics artist (made various short-lived newspaper comics), dies at age 74.
- July 19: Apeles Mestres, Spanish musician, novelist, illustrator and comics artist (made some sequential illustrations), dies at age 81.

=== Specific date unknown ===
- Ed Leffingwell, American comics artist (Little Joe), dies.
- Pál Spanyár, Hungarian painter, cartoonist and drawing teacher (13th District Secondary School), dies at age 61 or 62.

== First issues by title ==
- Big Book of Fun Comics (March, National Periodical Publications)
- The Comics Magazine (Funny Pages) (May, Centaur Publications)
- The Funnies (October, Dell Comics)
- Funny Picture Stories (November, Centaur Publications)
- King Comics (April, David McKay Publications)
- Popular Comics (February, Dell Comics)
- Tip Top Comics (April, United Features)

== Initial appearances by character name ==
- Clock, by George Brenner, in Funny Pages #6 and Funny Picture Stories #1 (November) - Centaur Publications

=== Comics debuts without a specific date ===
- Barney Baxter by Frank Miller.
- Belinda by Steve Dowling.
- Ben Bowyang by Alex Gurney.
- Biffen och Bananen by Rit-Ola
- Laff-a-Day debuts.
- Rebo by Cesare Zavattini (plot), Federico Pedrocchi (script) and Giovanni Scolari (art)
- Room and Board by Gene Ahern.
