= Linda Lamb =

American singer and musician

Linda Lamb is an American singer and musician of European descent, who has worked with Vitalic and Nina Hagen; she is known for her underground hit "Hot Room".

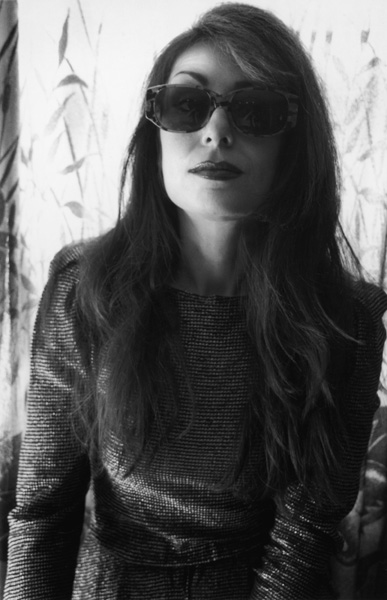
Lamb in 2002

== Career ==
Lamb was born in Woodstock, New York, United States. As a teenager, Lamb moved to Seattle and joined the punk scene and began singing in American bars and clubs while completing a B.A. in Animation. She also sang as a backup singer in a Motown group that was the opening act for artists such as Tina Turner, Etta James, Junior Walker, and James Brown. Lamb then travelled around Europe, gaining session work before finally settling in New York in the early 1990s, where she worked with her husband in his fashion company, Demob, and opened a boutique called Smylonylon in New York's Soho. They also made mixed compilation tapes with Alex Goor and sold them in the store, under the titles Smylonylon and Tynynyny. The tapes were a combination of two massive record collections; an eclectic mix of obscure easy listening, Italio-disco, electro and punk.

In 2001, Lamb’s song "Hot Room" was included on Gigolo Record’s Compilation No. 5 to enthusiastic reviews. "Hot Room" was released as a single with a Tiga remix and became a favourite in Europe being subsequently a permanent fixture on compilation albums throughout the world.

French recording artist Vitalic collaborated with Lamb on an extended play, entitled All You Can Eat, under the band name The Silures. The EP was a hit with DJs across Europe and America but to date has never been released fully. The track "Fishnets" became a dance floor anthem in clubs in 2003. Another track from the Silures EP, "21 Ghosts", was featured on Richard X’s Back to Mine. Lamb continued her creative partnership with Vitalic in 2006 with Bells and One Above One on Vitalic’s 2009 album Flashmob.

Lamb covered "She Died for Love" in 2004 with Trisomie 21 which was launched in Europe. Gigolo Records released Lamb's demo "King Meadowlands" on Gigolo Compilation No. 7. London-based Punx Soundcheck produced the track "Flowerpower" and it was released on their EP in 2007, together with original songs and remixes by Boy George and Marc Almond. Gigolo records released the demo of "Twins" in 2009, although it had been recorded in 2005.

During 2010, Lamb completed recording with Nina Hagen, singing a duet and also the backup vocals on Hagen's gospel album, Personal Jesus.

As of November 2011, Lamb was working on a collection of songs based on the poems of Margaret Sandbach of Hafodunos which was to be released as an album in 2012.

== Selected discography ==
=== Singles and EPs ===
- "Hot Room" (2 versions) (2002)
- "Hot Room"(12") (2002)
- All You Can Eat E.P (EP) (2 versions)(2003) with The Silures
- All You Can Eat E.P (12", EP) (2003) with The Silures
- "Bells" (2006) with Vitalic
- The Legends E.P. (EP) (2008) with Punx Soundcheck
- "Simplex" with Gipsy Family on Timid Records (2013)
- "Night Control" with Gipsy Family on Colina Records (2015)
- "Ground - Punkrocked" (EP) - Police Records with Gipsy Family, remixes David Caretta, Workerpoor, Museum, Gedeon, Skylab
- "West of Lily" (2016) with Gipsy Family - Colina Records

=== Appeared on ===
- International DeeJay Gigolos CD Seven (Comp) (2003)
- The Man Is A Mix Trisomie 21 (three-disc limited edition) (2004) Cover of She Died for Love
- OK Cowboy With Vitalic (two-disc collector's edition) (2006)
- International DeeJay Gigolos CD Nine (Comp) (2006)
- Flashmob with Vitalic (2009)
- Personal Jesus with Nina Hagen (2010)

=== Associated projects ===
- The Silures, with Vitalic and Mount Sims
- Margaret Sandbach, with Mark Baker

=== Covers ===
- Siobhan Fahey "Hot Room" (2002)
- Shakespears Sister "Hot Room" (2009)
