= Flash Gordon (1954 TV series) =

1954 TV series

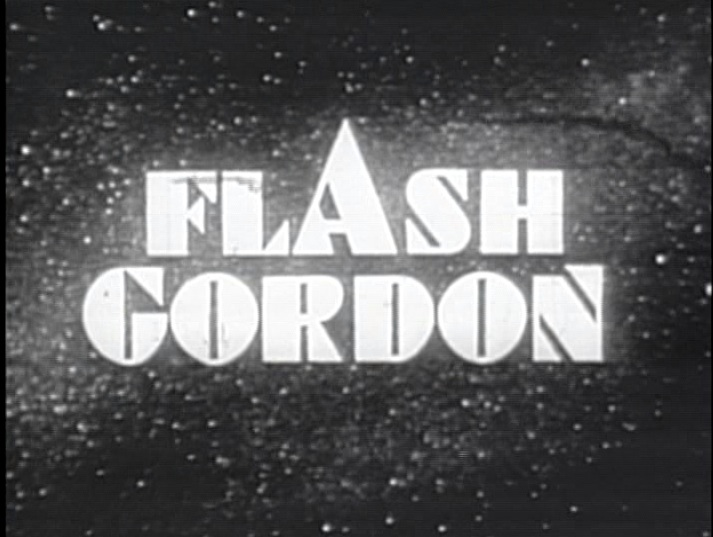
- Title card from episode "Akim the Terrible"
- Starring: Steve Holland; Irene Champlin; Joseph Nash
- Countries of origin: United States; West Germany; France
- No. of seasons: 1
- No. of episodes: 39

Production
- Running time: 0:25

Original release
- Network: DuMont Television Network; Syndicated
- Release: October 1, 1954 – July 15, 1955

Flash Gordon is a science-fiction television series based on the King Features characters of the Alex Raymond-created comic strip of the same name. The black and white television series was a West German, French, and American international co-production by Intercontinental Television Films and Telediffusion. The show aired from October 1, 1954, to July 15, 1955, on the DuMont Television Network.

== Plot ==
As agents of the Galactic Bureau of Investigation, the team travels the galaxy in their starship, the Sky Flash, battling cosmic villains under the order of Commander Paul Richards.

The series proved popular with American audiences and critical response, though sparse, was positive. Flash Gordon has garnered little modern critical attention. What little remains generally dismisses the series, although some critical thought has been devoted to its presentation of Cold War and capitalist themes.

== Cast ==
- Steve Holland as Flash Gordon
- Irene Champlin as Dale Arden
- Joseph Nash as Hans Zarkov
- Henry Beckman as Commander Richards

== Production ==
=== Development ===
Universal Studios had held the production rights to Flash Gordon, but allowed them to lapse. Former Universal executives Edward Gruskin and Matty Fox struck a deal with Flash Gordon owners King Features Syndicate to produce the first 26 episodes of the series. The series was produced by Gruskin and Wenzel Lüdecke. Writers for Flash Gordon included Gruskin, Bruce Geller and Earl Markham. Episodes were directed by Wallace Worsley Jr. and Gunther von Fritsch. Composers Kurt Heuser and Roger Roger provided much of the original music.

=== Filming ===
Shooting began in May 1953, with an abandoned beer hall in Spandau serving as the principal shooting location. Among the cast and crew, only the lead actors and director Worsley spoke English. Worsley recalled the production difficulties this caused:

No matter what galaxy we explored, everyone spoke with a German accent. The use of German actors who could not speak English required us to use a lot of close-ups. I would stand behind the camera, correctly positioned for the actor's look, and read his or her line; the actor would then repeat the line, mimicking my pronunciation and emphasis.

The series was budgeted at US$15,000 per episode on a three-day-per-episode shooting schedule. Citing salary disputes, Worsley withdrew from the project after completing the first 26 episodes. Production was moved to Marseille under the direction of Gunther von Fritsch for the 13 final episodes. At that time, producer Luedecke was replaced by American producer Edward Gruskin.

=== Locations ===
The series was filmed in West Berlin and Marseille as a West German, French, and American co-production by Intercontinental Television Films and Telediffusion.

=== Broadcast ===
The series aired in syndication throughout most of the US, but also aired on the East Coast on the DuMont Television Network.

== Episodes ==
No.	Title	Original release date
1	"The Planet of Death"	October 1, 1954
Flash, Dale and Zarkov travel to the planet Tarset to investigate an ancient curse. They must overcome a traitorous scientist and thwart an invasion from the evil planet Ebon.
2	"Escape into Time"	October 8, 1954
Flash and Zarkov must rescue Dale from a mad criminal who seeks to kidnap her with his time machine.
3	"The Electro Man"	October 15, 1954
Flash and company square off against the Electro Man, a mysterious deity who reigns over a planet where all life is made of metal.
4	"The Vengeance of Rabeed"	October 22, 1954
The mad Rabeed returns after 100 years in exile with plans to destroy the galaxy. It is up to Flash, Dale, and Zarkov to stop his evil scheme.
5	"Akim the Terrible"	November 5, 1954
The evil King Akim rules Charon, where the only law is lawlessness. After Akim brainwashes Flash's best friend into attempting to assassinate Flash, Dale and he travel to Charon to thwart Akim's nefarious schemes.
6	"The Claim Jumpers"	November 12, 1954
An old prospector who hits his claim and his daughter are threatened by claim jumpers, and it is up to Flash and friends to protect them.
7	"The Dancing Death"	November 19, 1954
The GBI team is held captive in a vibrational device that leads people to commit suicide.
8	"The Breath of Death"	November 26, 1954
Flash's greatest enemy escapes from prison and seizes control of the Sky Flash.
9	"The Great Secret"	December 3, 1954
Zarkov's experiments to return life to dead worlds are endangered.
10	"The Return of the Androids"	December 10, 1954
Flash, Dale, and Zarkov battle against an invading army of ancient androids.
11	"The Frightened King"	December 17, 1954
Flash and his GBI colleagues protect the king of the planet Xerxes, who is being plagued by terrible phantoms.
12	"The Deadly Deception"	December 24, 1954
A robot loaded with atomic bombs is launched into space. Flash must retrieve it before it is too late.
13	"Duel Against Darkness"	December 31, 1954
A planet whose culture resembles the Middle Ages is ruled by a despotic magician. Flash, Dale, and Zarkov are in a mission to end his evil reign.
14	"The Sound Gun"	January 14, 1955
The Sky Flash falls under attack by a powerful sonic weapon.
15	"The Weapon that Walked"	January 31, 1955
The GBI crew faces a woman who can turn humans to stone with a single look.
16	"Mission to Masca"	February 4, 1955
Flash and company travel to Masca, a silent planet.
17	"The Lure of Light"	February 11, 1955
Prudentia, evil queen of the planet Diana, kidnaps Dale Arden to force her to reveal the secret of faster-than-light travel. Flash and Zarkov must use that secret themselves to travel back in time to save Dale's life.
18	"The Rains of Death"	February 18, 1955
The galaxy is threatened by torrential rains and flooding. Zarkov suspects the rains are a plot and the crew sets out to foil it.
19	"The Race Against Time"	February 25, 1955
Half of the planets are lined up to strip the GBI of its authority and distribute its secrets amongst them. Earth casts the deciding vote in favor of keeping the GBI in control and selects Commander Richards to deliver the vote to the Galaxy Council on Mars. Krybian, the evil representative of Pluto, conspires with a master criminal to prevent Richards from voting, thus ensuring that GBI will lose its power. Flash foils the conspiracy and delivers Richards on time.
20	"The Witch of Neptune"	March 4, 1955
Part 1 of 3. Zydereen, the "Witch of Neptune", plots to take over the planet. To that end she brainwashes Zarkov and Commander Richards to destroy the planet's atmospheric converters.
21	"The Brain Machine"	March 11, 1955
Part 2 of 3. Flash and Dale race to Saturn to clear the names of the captive Zarkov and Commander Richards, accused of sabotaging Neptune's atmospheric converters. They battle the evil Zydereen, "Witch of Neptune", who brainwashed the captives and has stolen their knowledge of galactic defense.
22	"Struggle to the End"	March 18, 1955
Part 3 of 3. Using her stolen knowledge, Zydereen, Witch of Neptune, builds a solar ray and threatens to destroy all life if she is not declared Queen of the Galaxy. Flash and Dale race to Neptune to thwart her evil plot.
23	"The Water World Menace"	March 25, 1955
Underwater creatures wish to live out of the water, so they plot to steal a device to allow them to live on land.
24	"Saboteurs from Space"	April 1, 1955
As the Sky Flash is pulled off-course to an uncharted planet, every machine on Earth is seized by a mysterious "mechanical paralysis". Flash, Dale, and Zarkov must stop Ziering, ruler of Planet X, before he can kidnap the 100 leading scientists from Earth in his bid to take over the galaxy.
25	"The Forbidden Experiment"	April 8, 1955
From the near-lifeless planetoid Theta N-1, Dr. Fabian Prendis puts out a desperate call to Dr. Zarkov, at the command of his mysterious master. Upon arrival, Zarkov is taken captive and learns that Prendis is dead. His captor is a "lion-man", who demands that Zarkov continue Prendis' "transmutation" experiment to make him fully human in appearance. Flash and Dale discover where Zarkov has gone and race to his rescue.
26	"Heat Wave"	April 15, 1955
Increases in the Earth's temperature are traced to the planet Caloria. Flash and his crew must thwart the invasion.
27	"The Hunger Invasion"	April 22, 1955
Flash, Dale, and Zarkov must stave off a galactic invasion by a plague of devouring insects.
28	"Encounter with Evil"	April 29, 1955
A man called Evil confronts Flash, turning all of Flash's friends against him.
29	"The Matter Duplicator"	May 6, 1955
The GBI investigates a case of jewels mysteriously disappearing and reappearing.
30	"The Micro-Man Menace"	May 13, 1955
Flash and company work to stop a villain who is able to shrink people and entire planets.
31	"The Space Smugglers"	May 20, 1955
Flash and the GBI must stop smugglers who are transporting a drug that causes a hypnotic trance.
32	"The Mystery of Phoros"	May 27, 1955
The rulers of a disease-ridden planet prevent Flash, Dale, and Zarkov from trying to stop the epidemic.
33	"The Shadowy Death"	June 3, 1955
The planet Saturn seeks to join the Galaxy Council, but the son of the king acts to oppose it.
34	"Death in the Negative"	June 10, 1955
Queen Cygnil has the power to kill with a machine that turns people into photographic negatives, and it is up to Flash and friends to stop her.
35	"The Earth's Core"	June 17, 1955
A series of unexplained earthquakes prompts Flash to travel to the center of the planet to discover the cause. There, Dale, Zarkov, and he encounter Zaldu, despotic ruler of the underground kingdom, and must halt his plans to burn his way through to the surface world to invade.
36	"Deadline at Noon"	June 24, 1955
Planets are being destroyed and Earth is next. Flash, Dale, and Zarkov must time-travel to 1950s Berlin to defuse a bomb planted 1,250 years in the past.
37	"The Law of Velorum"	July 1, 1955
Dale goes missing and a desperate Flash must find her.
38	"The Skyjackers"	July 8, 1955
Flash, Dale, and Zarkov investigate the mysterious disappearances of a number of spaceships.
39	"The Subworld Revenge"	July 15, 1955
Strange tremors again threaten Earth, and Zarkov discovers that the evil Zaldu has survived his previous encounter with Flash and company and rebuilt his kingdom. The GBI team must once more journey deep underground in the Earth-borer Earthworm to thwart Zaldu once and for all.

== Critical response and themes ==
Variety noted that the series was, from a technical standpoint, "up to the demands of the script and the average viewer probably won't notice the differences in quality between this and home-grown produce". Flash Gordon was immediately popular in the United States and continued to run in syndication into the early 1960s.

Modern critical reaction to the series has been light, but largely negative. The production values have been derided frequently, with the series described as "bargain-basement". The televised series suffered in comparison to the earlier film serials, with the TV incarnation labeled "vastly inferior", lacking "good concepts and scripts", and "most of all, [lacking] Buster Crabbe, who was Flash Gordon". One positive comment noted Champlin's portrayal of Dale Arden, who was transformed from the typical damsel in distress of the serials into a trained scientist and a "quick thinker who often saved [Flash and Zarkov] from perishing".

Film theorist Wheeler Winston Dixon, far from decrying the series for its production values, found that "the copious stock footage and the numerous exterior sequences shot in the ruins of the bombed-out metropolis give Flash Gordon a distinctly ravaged look". He wrote that its international origins gave the series "an interesting new cultural dimension, even a perceptible air of a split cultural identity". Dixon quoted German cultural historian Mark Baker, who wrote of a particular scene from the episode "The Brain Machine" as emblematic of this cultural split. The scene used stock footage of a June 17, 1953, demonstration by East Berlin workers against the East German government. Soviet tanks opened fire on both demonstrators and bystanders, thus confirming East Germany's status as a Soviet puppet state in the minds of West Germans. American viewers, Baker speculated, were probably unaware of the iconic power in West Germany of the images of fleeing East Berliners, which were used to illustrate a panic on Neptune.

Dixon, noting the similarities between the ideals espoused by "space operas" – like Flash Gordon, Captain Video, and Rocky Jones, Space Ranger – and American Cold War values, argued that such series were designed to instill those values into their young viewers. Flash Gordon, he wrote, along with its fellow space operas, "have a common, unifying theme: peace in the universe can be achieved only by dangerous efforts and the unilateral dominance of the Western powers". This echoed the earlier critique of Soviet writer G. Avarin, who in the Soviet film journal Art of the Cinema had accused Gordon and other space-faring characters of being "the vanguard of a new and greater 'American imperialism'". The "ravaged look" of the series, Dixon wrote, "underscores the real-world stage on which the action of the space operas played".

== Preservation status ==
Physical copies of two episodes, "Escape into Time" (October 8, 1954) and "The Witch of Neptune" (March 4, 1955), are held in the J. Fred MacDonald collection at the Library of Congress. Twenty-four episodes are publicly available on various DVD releases and on websites such as the Internet Archive.

== See also ==
- List of programs broadcast by the DuMont Television Network
- List of surviving DuMont Television Network broadcasts
