= Flash Gordon =

Comic strip character created 1934

- Artwork for the cover of King: Flash Gordon #1 (January 2015, Dynamite Entertainment). Art by Ron Salas.

Publication information
- Publisher: King Features Syndicate
- First appearance: Flash Gordon comic strip; (January 7, 1934; 92 years ago)
- Created by: Alex Raymond

In-story information
- Team affiliations: Dale Arden; Dr. Hans Zarkov; Defenders of the Earth

Flash Gordon is the protagonist of an American space adventure comic strip created and originally drawn by Alex Raymond. First published January 7, 1934, the strip was inspired by, and created to compete with, the already established Buck Rogers adventure strip.

== Creation ==
The Buck Rogers comic strip had been commercially very successful, spawning novelizations and children's toys; King Features Syndicate decided to create its own science-fiction comic strip to compete with it. At first, King Features tried to purchase the rights to the John Carter of Mars stories by Edgar Rice Burroughs, but the syndicate was unable to reach an agreement with Burroughs. King Features then turned to Alex Raymond, one of their staff artists, to create the story.

One source for Flash Gordon was the Philip Wylie novel When Worlds Collide (1933). The book's themes of an approaching planet threatening the Earth, and an athletic hero, his girlfriend, and a scientist traveling to the new planet by rocket, were adapted by Raymond for the comic strip's initial storyline. Raymond's first samples were dismissed for not containing enough action sequences. Raymond reworked the story and sent it back to the syndicate, which accepted it. Raymond was partnered with ghostwriter Don W. Moore, an experienced editor and writer. Raymond's first Flash Gordon story appeared in January 1934, alongside Jungle Jim. The Flash Gordon strip was well received by newspaper readers, becoming one of the most popular American comic strips of the 1930s.

As with Buck Rogers, the success of Flash Gordon resulted in numerous licensed products being sold, including pop-up books, coloring books, and toy spaceships and rayguns.

== Comic strip characters and story ==
Flash Gordon and Dale Arden meet Ming the Merciless for the first time in the comic serial "On the Planet Mongo" (1934), art by Alex Raymond.

The Flash Gordon comic strip ran as a Sunday strip from 1934 until 2003, and daily strip from 1940 to 1944 and 1951 to 1992. Reprints of the Sunday strip were syndicated by King Features Syndicate from 2003 until 2023, when Flash Gordon was relaunched with a new daily and Sunday strip.

The comic strip follows the adventures of Flash Gordon, a handsome polo player and Yale University graduate, and his companions Dale Arden and Dr. Hans Zarkov. The story begins with Earth threatened by a collision with the planet Mongo. Dr. Zarkov invents a rocket ship to fly into space in an attempt to stop the disaster. Half mad, he kidnaps Flash and Dale. Landing on the planet, and halting the collision, they come into conflict with Ming the Merciless, Mongo's evil ruler.

For many years, the three companions have adventures on Mongo, traveling to the forest kingdom of Arboria, ruled by Prince Barin; the ice kingdom of Frigia, ruled by Queen Fria; the jungle kingdom of Tropica, ruled by Queen Desira; the undersea kingdom of the Shark Men, ruled by King Kala; and the flying city of the Hawkmen, ruled by Prince Vultan. They are joined in several early adventures by Prince Thun of the Lion Men. Eventually, Ming is overthrown, and Mongo is ruled by a council of leaders led by Barin.

Flash and friends visit Earth for a series of adventures before returning to Mongo and crashing in the kingdom of Tropica, later reuniting with Barin and others. Flash and his friends then travel to other worlds before returning once again to Mongo, where Barin, now married to Ming's daughter Princess Aura, has established a peaceful rule (except for frequent revolts led by Ming or by one of his many descendants).

In the 1950s, Flash became an astronaut who traveled to other planets besides Mongo. The long story of the Skorpi War takes Flash to other star systems, using starships that are faster than light.

In addition to Ming and his allies, Flash and his friends also fought several other villains, including Azura, the Witch Queen; Brukka, chieftain of the giants of Frigia; the fascistic Red Sword organisation on Earth; and Brazor, the tyrannical usurper of Tropica. After Raymond's tenure, later writers created new enemies for Flash to combat. Austin Briggs created Kang the Cruel, Ming's callous son. Prince Polon, who had the power to shrink or enlarge living creatures, the unscrupulous Queen Rubia, and Pyron the Comet Master were among the antagonists introduced during Mac Raboy's run. The Skorpi, a race of alien shape shifters who desired to conquer the galaxy, were recurring villains in both the Mac Raboy and Dan Barry stories. The Skorpi space-fighter ace Baron Dak-Tula became a periodic nemesis of Flash in the late 1970s stories.

== International versions of the comic strip ==
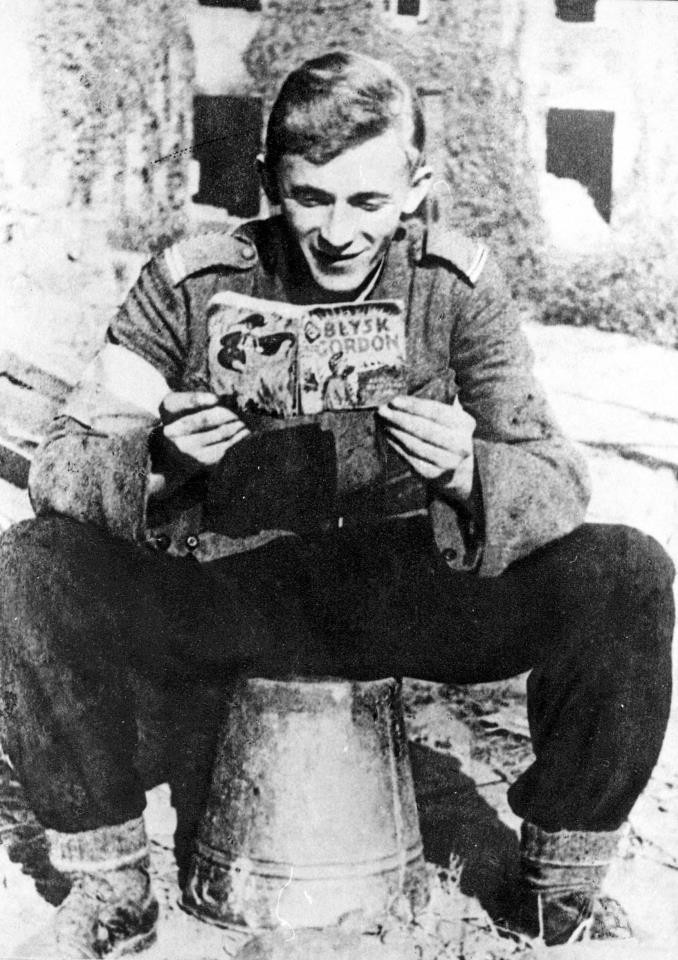
A young corporal of the Home Army reading a Polish edition of one of the Flash Gordon Big Little Books ("Błysk Gordon - Królowa Błękitnej Magii") during the Warsaw Uprising of 1944

King Features sold the Flash Gordon strip to newspapers across the world, and by the late 1930s, the strip was published in 130 newspapers, translated into eight foreign languages, and was read by 50 million people. In the 1930s and 1940s, several newspapers in Britain carried Flash Gordon, including the Scottish Sunday Mail. In France, his adventures were published in the magazine Robinson, under the name "Guy l'Éclair". Dale Arden was named Camille in the French translation. In Australia, the character and strip were renamed Speed Gordon to avoid a negative connotation of the word "Flash" (at the time, the predominant meaning of "flashy" was "showy", connoting dishonesty).

However, events in the 1930s affected the strip's distribution. Newspapers in Nazi Germany were forbidden to carry the Flash Gordon strip, while in Fascist Italy it was restricted to two newspapers. In 1938, the Spanish magazine Aventurero, the only publication in the country to carry Flash Gordon, ceased publication because of the Spanish Civil War. The outbreak of World War II resulted in Flash Gordon being discontinued in many countries. In Belgium, artist Edgar P. Jacobs was therefore asked to bring the current Flash Gordon story to a satisfactory conclusion, which he did.

After the war's end, the strip enjoyed a resurgence in international popularity. Flash Gordon reappeared in Italy, Spain, and West Germany, and it was also syndicated to new markets such as Portugal and the Republic of Ireland. From the 1950s onward, countries including Spain, Italy, and Denmark also reprinted Flash Gordon newspaper strips in comic-book or paperback-novel form. In India, Flash Gordon comics were published by Indrajal Comics.

== Later years ==
The popularity of Raymond's Flash Gordon Sunday strip meant a daily strip was also introduced. This strip, drawn by Austin Briggs, ran from 1941 to 1944. After Raymond left Flash Gordon in 1944 to join the US Marines, the daily strip was cancelled and Briggs took over the Sunday strip. Although Raymond wanted to return to drawing Flash Gordon after the war's end, King Features did not want to remove Briggs from his position. To conciliate Raymond, King Features allowed him to create a new strip, Rip Kirby. After Briggs left the Sunday strip in 1948, he was succeeded by former comic-book artist Mac Raboy, who drew the strip until his death in 1967. In 1951, King Features created a new daily Flash Gordon strip, drawn by Dan Barry, who was assisted during his tenure by Harvey Kurtzman and Harry Harrison, who both wrote scripts for the strip. Barry also had several artists who aided him with Flash Gordon's illustrations, including Frank Frazetta, Al Williamson, Bob Fujitani, Jack Davis, Sy Barry, Fred Kida, and Emil Gershwin. When Barry left the strip in 1990, various artists and writers worked on Flash Gordon. The daily strip was ended in 1993. The final artist to work on the Flash Gordon Sunday strip was Jim Keefe, who was occasionally assisted on the strip by other artists, including Williamson, John Romita Sr., and Joe Kubert. King Features ended the Flash Gordon newspaper strip in 2003, although reruns of Keefe's strip still appear in a few US newspapers.

On October 20, 2023, King Features Syndicate announced it would relaunch Flash Gordon on October 22 under cartoonist Dan Schkade, and would be released daily, with the Sunday strip being an overview of the week's strips.

== Strip bibliography ==
Alex Raymond's Flash Gordon (March 4, 1934): Flash and Thun rush to stop the wedding of Ming and Dale.

Artists
Years	Sundays	Dailies
1934−1940	Alex Raymond	N/A
1940−1944	Alex Raymond	Austin Briggs
1944−1948	Austin Briggs	N/A
1948−1950	Mac Raboy	N/A
1951−1967	Mac Raboy	Dan Barry
1967−1990	Dan Barry	
1990−1991	Ralph Reese & Gray Morrow	
1991−1993	Andrés Klacik	
1993−1996	Andrés Klacik	N/A
1996−2003	Jim Keefe	N/A
2003−2023	Jim Keefe (reruns)	N/A
2023−	Dan Schkade	

Don W. Moore wrote the strip during Raymond's tenure. Writers involved with Barry's daily run include Harvey Kurtzman from 1952 to 1953 and Harry Harrison from 1958 to 1964. Bruce Jones wrote during Reese and Morrow's tenure. Under Kalcik, writers included Richard Bruning, Kevin VanHook, and Thomas Warkentin.

Guido Fantoni drew an unofficial Flash Gordon comic strip in Italy's L'Avventuroso in 1938. Edgar P. Jacobs published a similarly unofficial strip in Belgium's Bravo in 1941.

== Critical reception and influence ==
Flash Gordon is regarded as one of the best illustrated and most influential of American adventure comic strips. Historian of science-fiction art Jane Frank asserted that because of his work on Flash Gordon, "Raymond is one of the most famous science-fiction artists of all time, although he never contributed an illustration to any science-fiction magazine or book". Comic-book artist Jerry Robinson has said, "What made Flash Gordon a classic strip was Raymond's artistry and the rich imagination he brought to his conceptions of the future", and described the final years of Raymond's tenure on the strip as being characterized by "sleek, brilliantly polished brush work." Science-fiction historian John Clute has stated, "The comics version of Flash Gordon was graceful, imaginative, and soaring", and included it on a list of the most important American science-fiction comics. In an article about Raymond for The Comics Journal, R.C. Harvey declared that Raymond's Flash Gordon displayed "a technical virtuosity matched on the comics pages only by Harold Foster in Prince Valiant". The Encyclopedia of Science Fiction stated that Flash Gordon's "elaborately shaded style and exotic storyline" made it one of the most influential comics, and that its art emphasized a "romantic baroque".

Flash Gordon (along with Buck Rogers) was a big influence on later science-fiction comic strips, such as the American Don Dixon and the Hidden Empire (1935 to 1941) by Carl Pfeufer and Bob Moore. In Italy, Guido Fantoni drew Flash Gordon in 1938, after the prohibition by the fascist regime. In Belgium, Edgar P. Jacobs was commissioned to produce a science-fiction comic strip in the style of Flash Gordon. Jacobs' new strip, Le Rayon U ("The U-Ray") began serial publication in Bravo in 1943. This version had text boxes that described the action and the dialogue, in the style of many Belgian comics of the time, similar to Hal Foster's version of Tarzan and Prince Valiant. In 1974, Jacobs reformatted Le Rayon U to include speech bubbles. This version was published in Tintin magazine and in book form by Dargaud-Le Lombard. The British comic The Trigan Empire, by Mike Butterworth and Don Lawrence, also drew on Flash Gordon for its artistic style. In Thailand Flash Gordon was a big influence for classic thai comics character Chaochaiphomthong (เจ้าชายผมทอง) (meaning "prince golden hair") a sword and magic hero created by Jullasak Amornvej in 1958.

Flash Gordon was also an influence on early superhero comics characters. Jerry Siegel and Joe Shuster based Superman's uniform of tights and a cape on costumes worn by Flash Gordon. Bob Kane's drawing of Batman on the cover of Detective Comics No. 27 (the first appearance of the character) was based on a 1937 Alex Raymond drawing of Flash Gordon. Dennis Neville modeled the comics hero Hawkman's costume on the "Hawkmen" characters in Raymond's Flash Gordon comic strip. In Avengers: Infinity War, Iron Man mockingly refers to Star-Lord as Flash Gordon due to their similar appearance and both being space heroes.

Scientist and track-and-field olympian Meredith C. Gourdine's nickname, "Flash" Gourdine, was based on Flash Gordon.

== Films ==
Most of the Flash Gordon film and television adaptations retell the early adventures on the planet Mongo.

=== Film serials ===
Flash Gordon was featured in three serial films starring Buster Crabbe: Flash Gordon (1936), Flash Gordon's Trip to Mars (1938), and Flash Gordon Conquers the Universe (1940). The 1936 Flash Gordon serial was condensed into a feature-length film titled Flash Gordon or Rocket Ship or Space Soldiers or Flash Gordon: Spaceship to the Unknown; the 1938 serial into a feature-length film entitled Flash Gordon: The Deadly Ray from Mars; and the 1940 serial into a feature-length film entitled The Purple Death from Outer Space.

The first Flash Gordon serial remains copyrighted, but the compilation made of the second serial, and the complete third serial are in the public domain.

=== Flash Gordon 1980 film ===
In the 1970s, several noted directors attempted to make a film of the story. Federico Fellini optioned the Flash Gordon rights from Dino De Laurentiis, but never made the film. George Lucas also attempted to make a Flash Gordon film in the 1970s, but was unable to acquire the rights from De Laurentiis, so he decided to create Star Wars, instead. De Laurentiis then hired Nicolas Roeg to make a Flash Gordon film, but was unhappy with Roeg's ideas, and Roeg left the project. De Laurentiis also discussed hiring Sergio Leone to helm the Flash Gordon film; Leone declined because he believed the script was not faithful to the original Raymond comic strips. Finally, De Laurentiis hired Mike Hodges to direct the Flash Gordon film.

Hodges' 1980 Flash Gordon film stars former Playgirl-centerfold Sam J. Jones in the title role. Its plot is based loosely on the first few years of the comic strip, revising Flash's backstory by making him the quarterback of the New York Jets instead of a polo player. Raymond's drawings feature heavily in the opening credits, as does the signature theme-song "Flash" by rock band Queen, who composed and performed the entire musical score.

Riding the coattails of Star Wars, Superman, and Star Trek: The Motion Picture, Flash Gordon was not a critical success on release. Melody Anderson co-starred with Jones as Dale Arden, alongside Chaim Topol as Dr. Hans Zarkov, Max von Sydow as Ming, Timothy Dalton as Prince Barin, Brian Blessed as Prince Vultan, Peter Wyngarde as Klytus, and Ornella Muti as Princess Aura. Produced by Dino De Laurentiis, with ornate production designs and costumes by Danilo Donati, the bright colors and retro effects were inspired directly by the comic strip and 1930s serials.

Brian Blessed's performance as the Hawkman leader Prince Vultan lodged the veteran stage and screen actor into the collective consciousness for the utterance of a single line – "GORDON'S ALIVE?!" – which, more than 30 years later, remained the most repeated, reused, and recycled quotation from both the film and Blessed's career.

The film's cult status led it to feature heavily in the comedy films Ted (2012) and Ted 2 (2015), causing a resurgence in interest in the film.

=== Unofficial films ===
In 1967, a low-budget Turkish adaptation of the comic was made, called Flash Gordon's Battle in Space (Baytekin – Fezada Çarpisanlar in Turkish). Hasan Demirtag played Flash Gordon.

Robb Pratt, director of the popular fan film Superman Classic, made Flash Gordon Classic, released in May 2015. The traditionally animated short features the characters Flash Gordon, girlfriend Dale Arden, sidekick Dr. Hans Zarkov, antagonist Ming the Merciless, and Princess Aura.

=== Possible future films ===
In 2010, Breck Eisner expressed interest to direct a three-dimensional film version of Flash Gordon. Since April 2014, 20th Century Fox was developing the Flash Gordon reboot with J. D. Payne and Patrick McKay writing the film's script. Matthew Vaughn was in talks to direct the film. Mark Protosevich was hired to rewrite the film's script. Julius Avery was later signed to write and direct the film, with Vaughn as producer alongside John Davis. An animated film was under development at Disney/Fox with Taika Waititi writing and directing. In August 2019, the animated film was believed to be cancelled, but in July 2021, producers John Davis and John Fox revealed that Waititi was still working on the film, though it would now be live action instead of animation.

== Television ==
=== Flash Gordon (1954–1955 live-action) ===
Steve Holland starred in a 1954–55 live-action television series which ran for 39 episodes. The first 26 episodes had the distinction of being filmed in West Berlin, Germany, less than a decade after the end of World War II. This is notable, given that some episodes show the real-life destruction still evident in Germany several years after the war. The final 13 episodes were filmed in Marseille, France.

In this series, Flash, Dale (Irene Champlin) and Dr. Zarkov (Joseph Nash) worked for the Galactic Bureau of Investigation. The actual timeline was established in one episode, "Deadline at Noon", in which Flash, Dale and Dr. Zarkov went back in time to Berlin in the year 1953. The GBI agents traveled in the Skyflash and Skyflash II spaceships.

The series was syndicated, appearing on stations affiliated with the long-defunct DuMont Network, and many other independent stations in the United States. It was recut into a movie in 1957.

=== Flash Gordon animated (1979–1982) ===
In 1979, Filmation produced an animated series, often referred to as The New Adventures of Flash Gordon, though it is actually titled Flash Gordon. The expanded title was used to distinguish it from previous versions. The project was originally designed as a television film but NBC decided to change it into an animated series.

=== Flash Gordon: The Greatest Adventure of All (1981) ===
Filmation produced this successful animated television movie, written by Star Trek writer Samuel A. Peeples, before they began their Saturday morning series, but the television movie did not actually air until the early 1980s (December 1981 in the UK, and August 1982 in the US).

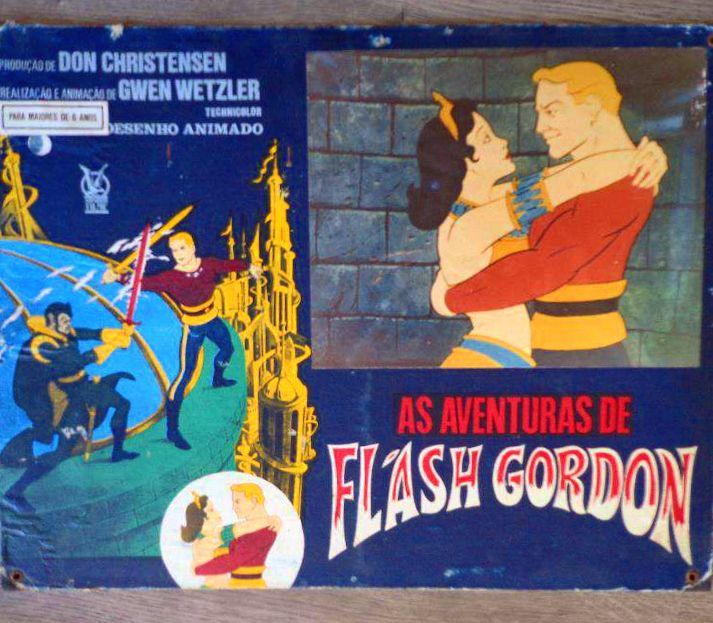
As Aventuras de Flash Gordon

This movie has yet to be commercially released in the United States, although some sources indicate that off-air bootlegs are prevalent. The only known commercial releases were by VAP Video in Japan (catalog #67019-128), in 1983, in both laserdisc and NTSC VHS videotape formats; and in Bulgaria, where it was released on VHS "Van Chris" and "Drakar". The movie also aired numerous times on "Diema" Channel in the late 1990s. In the Japanese release, it is presented uncut with the original English voice track, with Japanese subtitles added for its intended audience. At the movie's ending is a trailer for the De Laurentiis live-action movie, as well as trailers for other titles from the VAP Video library at the time. The covers for both versions feature comic-strip panels, using stills taken from the movie.

The movie was also released theatrically in some European Countries, as evidenced by this portuguese lobby card.

=== Defenders of the Earth (1986) ===
In the 1986 cartoon Defenders of the Earth, Flash teamed up with fellow King Features heroes The Phantom and Mandrake the Magician in 65 episodes. This series took extreme liberties with all the characters, revealing that Flash and Dale Arden had conceived a son, Rick Gordon, who is in his mid-teens when the series begins. Dale has her mind torn from her body by Ming in the first episode and is preserved in a crystal, which Rick is able to recover and give to his father. Dale is reborn on Earth as Dynak-X, the strategic super-computer based in the Defenders' Headquarters.

=== Flash Gordon (1996) ===
In 1996, Hearst Entertainment premiered an animated Flash Gordon television series. In this version, Alex "Flash" Gordon and Dale Arden are hoverboarding teenagers, who become trapped on Mongo after stopping Ming's attempt to invade Earth.

=== Flash Gordon (2007–2008 live-action) ===
A live-action series, comprising 22 one-hour episodes, was produced in Canada in early 2007. Under an agreement with King Features Syndicate, the series was produced by Reunion Pictures of Vancouver with Robert Halmi Sr. and Robert Halmi Jr. of RHI Entertainment serving as Executive Producers.

Sci-Fi Channel premiered its new Flash Gordon series in the United States on August 10, 2007.

The traditional primary supporting characters of Ming, Dale Arden, and Dr. Hans Zarkov were drastically altered. Eric Johnson, best known for his earlier work on the WB's Smallville, played the title character of Steven "Flash" Gordon. Gina Holden played Dale Arden, Jody Racicot played Dr. Hans Zarkov, and John Ralston portrayed the arch-villain, Ming.

== Radio serials and audio-dramas ==
Starting April 22, 1935, the strip was adapted into The Amazing Interplanetary Adventures of Flash Gordon, a 26-episode weekly radio serial. The series followed the strip very closely, amounting to a week-by-week adaptation of the Sunday strip for most of its run.

Flash Gordon was played by Gale Gordon, later famous for his television roles in Our Miss Brooks, Dennis the Menace, The Lucy Show, and Here's Lucy (the latter two with Lucille Ball). The cast also included Maurice Franklin as Dr. Zarkov and Bruno Wick as Ming the Merciless.

The radio series broke with the strip continuity in the last two episodes, when Flash, Dale, and Zarkov returned to Earth. They make a crash landing in Malaysia, where they meet Jungle Jim, the star of another of Alex Raymond's comic strips.

The series ended on October 26, 1935, with Flash and Dale's marriage. The next week, The Adventures of Jungle Jim picked up in that Saturday timeslot.

Two days later, on October 28, The Further Interplanetary Adventures of Flash Gordon debuted as a daily show, running four days a week. This series strayed further from Raymond's strip, involving Flash, Dale, and Zarkov in an adventure in Atlantis. The series aired 60 episodes, ending on February 6, 1936.

Twenty-six years after he had played Flash Gordon in the last of the three Universal film serials (1940), Buster Crabbe again played Flash for two newly recorded audio-dramas released as the 1966 LP, The Official Adventures Of Flash Gordon (MGM/Leo The Lion Records CH-1028).

== Stage ==
In 1989, Lee Ahlin and Gary Gordon wrote a musical for children, Flash Gordon, based on the comic. The musical premiered in 1989 in Oak Hall Performing Arts Theater in Gainesville, Florida. Flash Gordon starred Brian LeDuc as Flash, Kim Ehrich as Dale Arden, John Pelkey as Ming, and Julie Hamric as Princess Aura.

== Comic books ==
Over the years, several publishers have produced Flash Gordon comics, either reprints or original stories:

- David McKay Publications King Comics #1–155 (1936–1949) [strip reprints]
- Dell Comics Four Color Comics #10, 84, 173, 190, 204, 247, 424, 512; Flash Gordon #2 (1945–1953) [first 2 strip reprints]
- Harvey Comics #1–5 (1950) [strip reprints]
- Gold Key Comics #1 (1965) [reprints FC #173]
- King Comics #1–11 (1966–1967) (also in Phantom #18–20)
- Charlton Comics #12–18 (1969–1970)
- Gold Key Comics #19–27 (1978–1979); under their "Whitman Comics" #28–37 (1980–1982)

Several issues of the King Comics series were drawn by Al Williamson, who won the 1966 National Cartoonists Society Award for Best Comic Book for his work on the series. Williamson later said: "I was paying homage to Alex [Raymond], you know. I tried to treat his creation with respect and dignity and tried to do it to the best of my ability. I find that other artists who have done Flash Gordon just don't seem to get the feeling of the strip, you know. Flash is a noble guy and it's kind of nice to have that kind of a hero". King also released a comic version as a part of their Comics Reading Library in the 1970s.

Williamson provided artwork for a Western Publishing adaptation of Dino De Laurentiis' Flash Gordon film, written by Bruce Jones. It was released by Western Publishing in both hardcover and softcover formats to coincide with the film's release, and was also serialized in three issues of Whitman's Flash Gordon comic book, #31-33, March–May 1981.

In 1988, Dan Jurgens wrote a modernized version of the comic strip as a nine-issue DC Comics miniseries. It features Flash as a washed-up basketball player who finds new purpose in life on Mongo, Dale as an adventurous reporter who is just as capable as Flash, and a gray-skinned Ming who is less of an Asian stereotype. The series ran for the planned nine issues and was left with an open-ended conclusion. Though Mongo is not a threat to Earth in this series, Ming had every intention of conquering Earth once he coerced Dr. Zarkov into designing the needed ships.

In 1995, Marvel Comics published a new two-issue series, written by Mark Schultz with art by Al Williamson, in the style of the Flash comics Williamson had produced for King and others.

A new comic-book series was released by Ardden Entertainment in August 2008, though with inconsistent release dates for subsequent issues. The series, written by Brendan Deneen and Paul Green, debuted in 2008, with the first arc entitled "The Mercy Wars". The initial story arc concluded in mid-2009. These were followed by further storylines. Ardden also published a Flash Gordon anthology entitled The Secret History of Mongo. Ardden's second Flash Gordon arc is titled Invasion of the Red Sword (2010). Two other arcs were completed.

A reprint of all of Al Williamson's Flash Gordon comic books in black and white was printed by Flesk in 2009.

In 2010, Dark Horse Comics began an archive reprint series in hardback, starting with the original comics published by Dell. The second volume covers the comics published by King Comics, the third covers the comics published by Charlton Comics, the fourth covers the comics published by Gold Key, and the fifth covers the comics published by Whitman.

In 2011, Dynamite Entertainment began a new series called Flash Gordon: Zeitgeist. The series is written by Eric Trautmann (Vampirella, Red Sonja), from a story and designs by Alex Ross (Kingdom Come, Marvels, Project: Superpowers) and illustrated by Daniel Lindro. The company also produced a spin-off miniseries, Merciless: The Rise of Ming, in 2012, with story and art by Scott Beatty and Ron Adrian. Following a crossover miniseries called King's Watch (where, much like Defenders of the Earth, Flash Gordon teamed up with Mandrake and the Phantom; albeit, set in the 21st century), Dynamite launched a new Flash Gordon ongoing series in 2014, with story and art by Jeff Parker and Evan "Doc" Shaner. In 2015, Dynamite followed this run with another Flash Gordon miniseries as part of their "King: Dynamite" series. This series was written by Ben Acker and Ben Blacker and illustrated by Lee Ferguson.

In July 2023, Mad Cave Studios announced that it had obtained the license to publish new stories, graphic novels, and reprints. In 2024, Mad Cave Studios published a new Flash Gordon comic book, a trade paperback of Marvel's Defenders of the Earth series and launched a new series of the team.

== Flash Gordon Strange Adventure Magazine ==
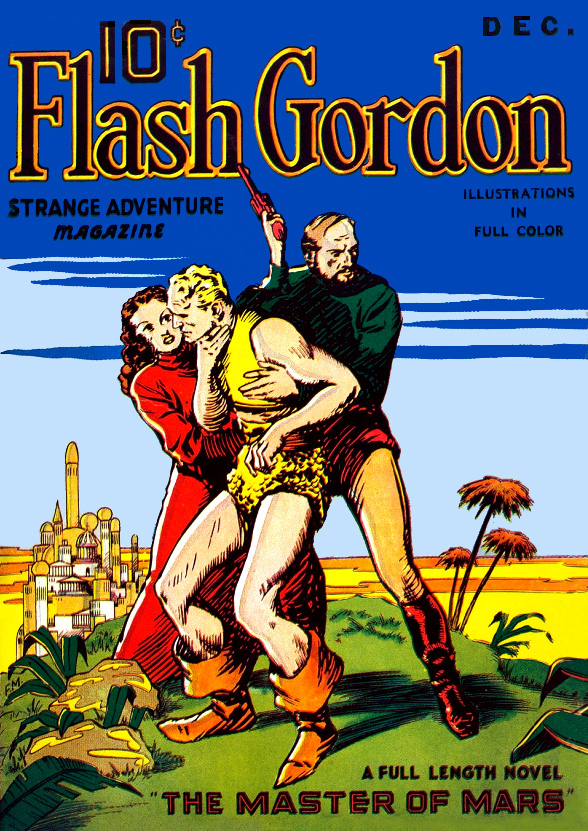
Cover of the December 1936 issue of Flash Gordon Strange Adventures.

In 1936, one issue of Flash Gordon Strange Adventure Magazine was published by Harold Hersey, featuring a novel about Flash Gordon, entitled The Master of Mars. It was written by little-known author James Edison Northford. The saddle-stitched novel was based (more or less) on the comic strip story lines, and included color illustrations reminiscent of Alex Raymond's artwork. On the back pages a second installment, The Sun Men of Saturn, was promised, but it never saw print. Even though the series did not gain in popularity, the lone issue of Flash Gordon Strange Adventure Magazine has become a much sought-after item for pulp magazine collectors.

== Novels ==
=== Big Little Books ===
The Flash Gordon strip was adapted for the Big Little Books series by the Whitman Publishing Company in 1934; the books follow the strip stories very closely and were designed with a captioned illustration opposite each page of text. The series ran for 14 installments from 1934 until 1948. The books were:

- "Flash Gordon on the Planet Mongo" (1934)
- "Flash Gordon and the Monsters of Mongo" (1935)
- "Flash Gordon and the Tournaments of Mongo" (1935)
- "Flash Gordon and the Witch Queen of Mongo" (1936)
- "Flash Gordon vs. the Emperor of Mongo" (1936)
- "Flash Gordon in the Water World of Mongo" (1937)
- "Flash Gordon in the Forest Kingdom of Mongo" (1938)
- "Flash Gordon and the Perils of Mongo" (1940)
- "Flash Gordon and the Tyrant of Mongo" (1941)
- "Flash Gordon and the Ice World of Mongo" (1942)
- "Flash Gordon and the Ape Men of Mor" (1942)
- "Flash Gordon and the Power Men of Mongo" (1943)
- "Flash Gordon and the Red Sword Invaders" (1945)
- "Flash Gordon in the Jungles of Mongo" (1947)
- "Flash Gordon and the Fiery Desert of Mongo" (1948)

=== Flash Gordon in the Caverns of Mongo (1936) ===
The first novel based on the strip, Flash Gordon in the Caverns of Mongo, was published in 1936 by Grosset & Dunlap. The credited author was Alex Raymond, but Doug Murray claims the novel "was almost certainly ghost-written". Like the pulp magazine of the same year, it failed to launch a series.

=== Avon Books ===
In 1973, Avon Books launched a six-book series of adult-oriented Flash Gordon novels:

- The Lion Men of Mongo
- The Plague of Sound
- The Space Circus
- The Time Trap of Ming XIII
- The Witch Queen of Mongo
- The War of the Cybernauts

Although the books were credited to Alex Raymond, the first three were written by SF writer Ron Goulart (under the house name "Con Steffanson") and the other three novels were by Bruce Cassiday (the first under the "Steffanson" name, and the latter two under the pseudonym "Carson Bingham").

=== 1980 film novelization ===
A novelization of the 1980 film was written by Arthur Byron Cover, and published in the United States by Jove Publications and in the United Kingdom by New English Library.

=== Tempo Books ===
In 1980, Tempo Books released a series by David Hagberg:

- Book One: Massacre in the 22nd Century (1980)
- Book Two: War of the Citadels (1980)
- Book Three: Crisis on Citadel II (1980)
- Book Four: Forces from the Federation (1981)
- Book Five: Citadels under Attack (1981)
- Book Six: Citadels on Earth (1981)

Except for the names of the hero and his co-stars of Dale Arden and Dr. Hans Zarkov, this series had little to do with any other version of Flash Gordon.

== 1939 World's Fair ==
The name "Flash Gordon" was emblazoned on the proscenium of a ride at the 1939 New York World's Fair. An article in Popular Science (March 1939) described how 150 people could enter a ride designed to resemble a rocket ship with a motion picture screen and vibrating seats for a simulated trip to another planet. The ride was located "at the opposite end of the amusement zone from the parachute tower". Fairgoers walked around a simulation of Venus as a jungle planet, inhabited by mechanical dinosaurs to enter a "Martian Headquarters", where "weirdly costumed Martians and mechanically animated models of giant beasts enact[ed] episodes from the adventures of Flash Gordon". The ride's Martians did not look like those in the 1938 serial, nor did the rocket ship.

== Reprints ==
Raymond's work, particularly his Sunday strips, has been reprinted many times over the years by many different publishers.

Some of the Austin Briggs dailies were reprinted by Kitchen Sink Press. The King Comics run of Flash Gordon reprinted one Alex Raymond story and two Mac Raboy ones in 1967. The Mac Raboy Sundays have been reprinted by Dark Horse Comics in black and white, while Kitchen Sink began to collect both the Dan Barry and Austin Briggs daily strips. The Dan Barry dailies have never been entirely reprinted, but the Barry stories written by noted author Harry Harrison were reprinted in Comics Revue magazine, published by Manuscript Press. Tempo Books published six mass-market paperbacks reprinting Dan Barry strips from the 1970s in the 1980s. Two stories from the Dan Barry dailies, D2-133 "Baldur Battles Skorpi" (February 24 to May 10, 1986) and D2-134 "The Bear" (May 12 to August 21, 1986), were reprinted in an oblong format, 6.5 by 10.5 paperback edition with two strips per page by Budget Books PTY of Melbourne, Australia in 1987 under the title The New Adventures of Flash Gordon, ISBN 0-86801-795-7. A reprint of all of Al Williamson's Flash Gordon comic strip and comic book work was released in 2009. All of the reprints from Mad Cave Studios listed below have previously appeared in excellent editions from IDW Publishing or Titan Publishing Group.

Title	Collects	Publisher	Publication date	IBSN	Notes
Flash Gordon on the Planet Mongo	1934–35	Nostalgia			
Flash Gordon into the Water World	1935–37	Nostalgia			
Flash Gordon Escapes to Arboria	1937–39	Nostalgia			
Flash Gordon vs Frozen Horrors	1939–40	Nostalgia			
Flash Gordon Joins the Power Men	1940–41	Nostalgia			
Flash Gordon: A New Kingdom	1939	Pacific Comics Club/Club Anni Trenta	1977		(limited edition for collectors)
Flash Gordon: The End of Ming	1940	Pacific Comics Club/Club Anni Trenta	1977		(limited edition for collectors)
Flash Gordon: Return to Earth	1941	Pacific Comics Club/Club Anni Trenta	1977		(limited edition for collectors)
Flash Gordon: A New War	1941	Pacific Comics Club/Club Anni Trenta	1977		(limited edition for collectors)
Flash Gordon: The Usurper	1942	Pacific Comics Club/Club Anni Trenta	1977		(limited edition for collectors)
Flash Gordon: Gundar the Hawk of Tropica	1942–43	Pacific Comics Club/Club Anni Trenta	1977		(limited edition for collectors)
Flash Gordon: The End of Brazor	1944	Pacific Comics Club/Club Anni Trenta	1977		(limited edition for collectors)
Mongo, Planet of Doom	1934–35	Kitchen Sink Press		978-0-87816-114-0	
Three Against Ming	1935–37	Kitchen Sink Press		978-0-87816-120-1	
The Tides of Battle	1937–39	Kitchen Sink Press		978-0-87816-162-1	
The Fall of Ming	1939–41	Kitchen Sink Press		978-0-87816-168-3	
Between Worlds at War	1941–43	Kitchen Sink Press		978-0-87816-177-5	
Triumph in Tropica	1943–44	Kitchen Sink Press		978-0-87816-199-7	
Flash Gordon, Dead or Alive!: Daily Strips 5/27/40 to 8/26/40 by Austin Briggs		Pacific Comics Club	1981		(limited edition for collectors)
Prisoner of Ming : Daily Strips 8/27/40 to 11/13/40 by Austin Briggs		Pacific Comics Club	1981		(limited edition for collectors)
Flight to Freeland: Daily Strips 11/14/40 to 2/28/41 by Austin Briggs		Pacific Comics Club	1981		(limited edition for collectors)
Adora of the Forest People: Daily Strips 3/1/41 to 8/23/41 by Austin Briggs		Pacific Comics Club	1981		(limited edition for collectors)
Flash Gordon: The Dailies by Austin Briggs 1940–1942 Volume 1	strips from 1940	Kitchen Sink Press		978-0-87816-172-0	
Flash Gordon: The Dailies by Austin Briggs 1940–1942 Volume 2	strips from 1941	Kitchen Sink Press		978-0-87816-187-4	
Flash Gordon The Complete Daily Strips 1951–1953		Kitchen Sink Press		978-0-87816-035-8	
Flash Gordon - Star Over Atlantis	dailies 1953–1954.	Manuscript Press	2007	978-0-936414-16-4	
Flash Gordon: Volume 1 (1934–35)		Checker Book Publishing Group		978-0-9741664-3-8	
Flash Gordon: Volume 2 (1935–36)		Checker Book Publishing Group		978-0-9741664-6-9	
Flash Gordon: Volume 3 (1936–37)		Checker Book Publishing Group		978-1-933160-25-2	
Flash Gordon: Volume 4 (1938–40)		Checker Book Publishing Group		978-1-933160-26-9	
Flash Gordon: Volume 5 (1940–41)		Checker Book Publishing Group		978-1-933160-27-6	
Flash Gordon: Volume 6 (1941–43)		Checker Book Publishing Group		978-1-933160-28-3	
Flash Gordon: Volume 7 (1943–45)		Checker Book Publishing Group		978-1-933160-20-7	
Mac Raboy's Flash Gordon, Volume 1	Sundays 1948–1953 S32-S45	Dark Horse Comics		978-1-56971-882-7	
Mac Raboy's Flash Gordon, Volume 2	Sundays 1953–1958 S45-S68	Dark Horse Comics			
Mac Raboy's Flash Gordon, Volume 3	Sundays 1958–1962	Dark Horse Comics		978-1-56971-978-7	
Mac Raboy's Flash Gordon, Volume 4	Sundays 1962–1967	Dark Horse Comics			
The Amazing Adventures of Flash Gordon, Volume 1	S132/D2-097 - S135	Tempo Books		978-0-448-17349-8	
The Amazing Adventures of Flash Gordon, Volume 2	D2-081, D2-082	Tempo Books		978-0-448-17348-1	
The Amazing Adventures of Flash Gordon, Volume 3	S114-S118	Tempo Books		978-0-448-17347-4	
The Amazing Adventures of Flash Gordon, Volume 4	D2-105, D2-107	Tempo Books		978-0-448-17155-5	
The Amazing Adventures of Flash Gordon, Volume 5	D2-098	Tempo Books		978-0-448-17208-8	
The Amazing Adventures of Flash Gordon, Volume 6	D2-102, D2-109	Tempo Books		978-0-448-17245-3	
Al Williamson's Flash Gordon: A Lifelong Vision of the Heroic		Flesk		978-1-933865-13-3	
Flash Gordon: On the Planet Mongo: The Complete Flash Gordon Library 1934–37		Titan Books		978-0-85768-154-6	
Flash Gordon: The Tyrant of Mongo: The Complete Flash Gordon Library 1937–41		Titan Books		978-0-85768-379-3	
Flash Gordon: The Fall of Ming: The Complete Flash Gordon Library 1941–44		Titan Books		978-0-85768-688-6	
Flash Gordon: The Storm Queen of Valkir: The Complete Flash Gordon Library 1944-48	Sundays from Aug 20, 1944 to Jul 25, 1948	Titan Books		978-1-78276-286-7	
Flash Gordon Dailies: The City of Ice: The Complete Flash Gordon Library 1951-1953	Dailies from Nov 11, 1951 to Oct 10, 1953	Titan Books		978-1-78276-683-4	
Flash Gordon Dailies: The Lost Continent: The Complete Flash Gordon Library 1953-1956	Dailies from Oct 26, 1953 to Jul 9 1956	Titan Books		978-1-78276-684-1	
Flash Gordon Sundays: The Death Planet: The Complete Flash Gordon Library 1967-1971	Sundays from Jul 20, 1967 to Jul 18, 1971	Titan Books		978-1-78586-136-9	
Flash Gordon Dailies: Radium Mines of Electra: The Complete Flash Gordon Library 1940-42	Dailies from May 1940 to Sep 1942	Titan Books		978-1-78586-137-6	
Definitive Flash Gordon and Jungle Jim Volume 1: 1934-1936		IDW Publishing		978-1-61377-015-3	
Definitive Flash Gordon and Jungle Jim Volume 2: 1936-1939		IDW Publishing		978-1-61377-220-1	
Definitive Flash Gordon and Jungle Jim Volume 3: 1939-1941		IDW Publishing		978-1-61377-580-6	
Definitive Flash Gordon and Jungle Jim Volume 4: 1942-1944		IDW Publishing		978-1-61377-917-0	
Flash Gordon: Classic Collection Vol. 1	Sundays from Jan 1, 1934 to Apr 18, 1937	Mad Cave Studios	Aug 13, 2024	978-1-5458-1320-1	
Flash Gordon: Classic Collection Vol. 2	Sundays from Apr 25, 1937 to Jan 12, 1941	Mad Cave Studios	Nov 12, 2024	978-1-5458-1204-4	
Flash Gordon: Classic Collection Vol. 3	Sundays from Jan 19, 1941 to Aug 13, 1944	Mad Cave Studios	Mar 25, 2025	978-1-5458-1614-1	
Flash Gordon: Classic Collection Vol. 4	Sundays from Aug 20, 1944 to Jul 25, 1948.	Mad Cave Studios	Jun 24, 2025	978-1-5458-1775-9	
Flash Gordon: Classic Collection Vol. 5	Dailies from Nov 19, 1951 to Oct 24, 1953	Mad Cave Studios	Oct 28, 2025	978-1-5458-2062-9	
Flash Gordon: Classic Collection Vol. 6	Dailies from Oct 26, 1953 to Jul 9, 1956	Mad Cave Studios	Feb 24, 2026	978-1-5458-2341-5	
Flash Gordon: Classic Collection Vol. 7	Sundays from Jul 30, 1967 to Jul 18, 1971	Mad Cave Studios	Jun 23, 2026	978-1-5458-2705-5	

== Games ==
- The Flash Gordon & the Warriors of Mongo role-playing game was released by Fantasy Games Unlimited in 1977.
- A Flash Gordon video game was released for the Atari 2600 by Fox Video Games in 1983, based loosely on the 1980 film.
- A different Flash Gordon video game was released by Mastertronic for home computers in 1986 also based on the film.
- The Savage World of Flash Gordon Roleplaying Game written by Scott Alan Woodard was released by Pinnacle Entertainment Group in 2018.
- Flash Gordon (pinball)

== DVD releases ==
Flash Gordon has been released to DVD under a variety of titles and in both edited and non-edited versions. Conquers The Universe and 1950s television series have no shortage of public domain DVD releases.

=== Film serials (1936–1940) ===
==== Flash Gordon (1936) ====
- Flash Gordon: Space Soldiers (245 minutes)
- Flash Gordon: Spaceship to the Unknown. Hearst Entertainment, Inc., 2002. (edited to 98 minutes)

==== Flash Gordon's Trip to Mars (1938) ====
- Flash Gordon's Trip to Mars (2 discs) (299 minutes)
- Flash Gordon: O raio mortal de Marte. Hearst Entertainment, Inc., 2002. (97 minutes)

==== Flash Gordon Conquers the Universe (1940) ====
- Flash Gordon Conquers the Universe (234 minutes)
- Flash Gordon: The Peril from Planet Mongo. Hearst Entertainment, Inc., 2002. (edited to 91 minutes)

=== Flash Gordon (1954–1955) ===
- Flash Gordon (three volumes). Alpha Home Entertainment (only thirteen of the episodes have been released thus far).

=== The New Adventures of Flash Gordon (1979) ===
US – BCI Eclipse

- The New Adventures of Flash Gordon: The Complete Series (4–Discs). 600 minutes

UK – Hollywood DVD LTD

- The Adventures of Flash Gordon – Castaways in Tropica
- The Adventures of Flash Gordon – Blue Magic

=== Flash Gordon (1980) ===
On May 6, 1998, Image Entertainment released the 1980 film on DVD in North America for DVD Region 1 territories through a contract with Universal, but it quickly went out of print.

Momentum Pictures later released it in the United Kingdom for DVD Region 2 territories on October 10, 2005. This edition of the film, the "Silver Anniversary Edition", features an anamorphic widescreen transfer at the film's 2.4:1 aspect ratio, both Dolby Digital and DTS 5.1 audio, the original Queen theatrical trailer, an audio commentary by director Mike Hodges, a second audio commentary from actor Brian Blessed, an interview with Mike Hodges, a photo slideshow and an original 1940s Serial, episode one of Flash Gordon Conquers the Universe.

Universal released the film on August 7, 2007, in North America and Region 1 territories once again. The new disc, entitled the "Savior of the Universe Edition", features a 2.35:1 anamorphic widescreen transfer and an English Dolby Digital 5.1 Surround track. Extras include an "Alex Ross on Flash Gordon" featurette in which world-renowned comic artist Alex Ross talks about the film and how it has inspired him in his life and work, a "Writing a Classic" featurette with screenwriter Lorenzo Semple Jr. and a Flash Gordon 1936 serial episode (chapter one of "The Planet of Peril").

=== Defenders of the Earth ===
US – BCI Eclipse LLC

- Defenders of the Earth – The Complete Series, Volume 1 (5 Discs) 33 Episodes
- Defenders of the Earth – The Complete Series, Volume 2 (5 Discs) 32 Episodes (Spring 2007)

UK – Hollywood DVD LTD

- Defenders of The Earth – The Story Begins

UK – Delta Music PLC

- Defenders of the Earth Movie (3 Discs)
- Defenders of the Earth Vol 1
- Defenders of the Earth Vol 2
- Defenders of the Earth Vol 3
- Defenders of the Earth Movie – Prince of Kro-Tan
- Defenders of the Earth Movie – Necklace of Oros
- Defenders of the Earth Movie – The Book of Mysteries

UK – Fabulous Films Ltd.

- Defenders of the Earth – The Complete Series

=== Flash Gordon (1996) ===
Lionsgate on September 21, 2004, released three 4-episode DVDs of Flash Gordon (1996) and Phantom 2040.

- Flash Gordon: Marooned on Mongo – The Animated Movie (97 minutes)

== Parodies ==
Flesh Gordon (1974) is an American erotic science fiction adventure comedy film. It is an erotic spoof of the Universal Pictures Flash Gordon serials from the 1930s. The screenplay was written by Michael Benveniste, who also co-directed the film with Howard Ziehm. The cast includes Jason Williams, Suzanne Fields, and William Dennis Hunt. The film had an MPAA rating of X, but was also re-edited for a reduced rating of R. It has an original runtime of 78 minutes, and the unrated "collector's edition" release runs 90 minutes.

Several episodes of Star Trek: Voyager featured a holodeck program called The Adventures of Captain Proton, which features many elements lifted straight from the Flash Gordon serials of the 1930s.

The comedy film A Christmas Story (1983) featured a deleted scene with Ralphie and his Red Ryder BB gun saving Flash (played by Paul Hubbard) from Ming (played by Colin Fox). None of the footage from the scene survived.

In the comedy film Ted (2012), Sam Jones appears in character both as himself and as Flash Gordon. Jones reprised his role for the sequel Ted 2 (2015).
