= V Live (album) =

Live album by Vitalic
- Released: September 25, 2007
- Recorded: 2007
- Genres: Electronic, dance, electro house
- Length: 59:06
- Label: Different/Pias
- Producer: Vitalic (Pascal Arbez-Nicolas)

Vitalic chronology
| OK Cowboy (2005) | V Live (2007) | Flashmob (2009) |

Professional ratings
Review scores
| Source | Rating |
|---|---|
| Pitchfork | 3.0/10 |

V Live is a live album by Vitalic released in 2007. The album is an exact recording of Vitalic's live performance in Ancienne Belgique, Brussels.

== Track listing ==
1. "Polkamatic" – 2:05
2. "Disco Nouveau (Live Intro)" – 2:15
3. "Bambalec" – 1:57
4. "Anatoles" – 4:37
5. "Follow the Car" – 4:08
6. "Bells" – 5:19
7. "The 30000 Feet Club" – 5:35
8. "Rhythm in a Box 1 & 2" – 4:44
9. "La Rock 01" – 7:43
10. Filth n' Dirt - "Go Ahead (Vitalic Garage Remix)" – 4:04
11. "My Friend Dario" – 3:58
12. "No Fun (Play the Guitar Johnny)" – 5:57
13. "Fast Lane" – 2:33
14. "Valletta Fanfares (Live Version Outro)" – 4:18
