= Bustenskjold =

1958 film

- Directed by: Helge Lunde
- Written by: Anders Bjørgaard; Sigurd Lybeck
- Starring: Leif Juster
- Release date: 26 December 1958
- Running time: 96 minutes
- Country: Norway
- Language: Norwegian

Bustenskjold is a 1958 Norwegian comedy film directed by Helge Lunde, starring Leif Juster. It is based on the cartoon Jens von Bustenskjold by Anders Bjørgaard and Sigurd Lybeck.
