= James Bama =

American painter (1926–2022)

James Barma
- Born: April 28, 1926; Washington Heights, New York, USA
- Died: April 24, 2022 (aged 95)

James Elliott Bama (April 28, 1926 – April 24, 2022) was an American artist known for his realistic paintings and etchings of Western subjects. Life in Wyoming led to his comment, "Here an artist can trace the beginnings of Western history, see the first buildings, the oldest wagons, saddles and guns, and be up close to the remnants of Indian culture ... And you can stand surrounded by nature's wonders."

== Biography ==
Born in Washington Heights, New York, in 1926, he grew up copying Alex Raymond's Flash Gordon comic strip. He had his first professional sale when he was 15, a drawing of Yankee Stadium in the New York Journal-American. He graduated from New York's High School of Music and Art and entered the Army Air Forces, working as a mechanic, mural painter, and physical training instructor.

When discharged from the service, and back in New York City, he studied drawing and anatomy at the Art Students League. Beginning in 1951, he was an illustrator at New York's Charles E. Cooper Studios for 15 years. His first paperback cover was Nelson Nye's A Bullet for Billy the Kid (1950). Bama had a 22-year career as a successful commercial artist, producing paperback book covers, movie posters and illustrations for such publications as Argosy, The Saturday Evening Post and Reader's Digest, and his numerous clients included the New York Giants football team, the Baseball and Football Halls of Fame and the U.S. Air Force. Beginning with The Man of Bronze (1964), he did a powerful set of 62 covers for the Doc Savage Bantam Books paperbacks, often using as a model actor Steve Holland, star of TV's Flash Gordon (1954–55). He also painted the box cover art for Aurora's monster model kits, including King Kong, Frankenstein, Dracula and The Mummy.

In 1964 he married Lynne Klepfer, a New York University graduate with an art history major. Two years later, in June 1966, the couple headed west as guests of artist Bob Meyers at his Circle M ranch near Cody, Wyoming. Meyers had walked out on his career as a successful Manhattan illustrator with such magazines as True and The Saturday Evening Post to run his ranch and paint. After return visits in 1967, the Bamas left New York and moved, in September 1968, into a cabin on Meyers' ranch. Bama began to paint contemporary Western subjects during the daytime while doing his freelance illustrations in the evenings. He recalled, "I never came out here with the idea to be a Western artist. It just happened, and that’s the way it should be."

In 1970 Bob Meyers was murdered, and his widow Helen moved from the ranch. The Bamas moved to a house on Dunn Creek, Wapiti, 20 miles outside Cody, in 1971. In May 1971, Bama connected with a New York dealer, prompting his decision to abandon illustration and put his total concentration into the creation of easel paintings. In Wapiti, James and Lynne Bama built a home and studio, moving into it when their son Ben was born in 1977.

His work is collected in The Western Art of James Bama (Bantam Books, 1975) and The Art of James Bama (1993). Brian M. Kane's James Bama: American Realist (Flesk, 2006) has an introduction by Harlan Ellison.

Bama died on April 24, 2022, four days before his 96th birthday.

== Style ==
Bama's art is realistic. He sometimes took advantage of his medium to use lighting techniques—such as butterfly lighting — that would not be practical in a photograph taken under ambient light. Thousands of photographs he took as studies for his paintings are held by the McCracken Research Library at the Buffalo Bill Center of the West.

== Awards ==
Bama was presented with the Spectrum Grand Master Award in 1998 and was inducted into the Illustrator’s Hall of Fame on June 28, 2000. At the Buffalo Bill Historical Center, when he was the first Honored Artist at the Buffalo Bill Art Show in 2003, Bama commented, "Everything I’ve done — the rodeo, the trappers, the mountain men — has been done around here. The fact that I’m from Cody makes this very significant to me. They’re really honoring Cody and the Buffalo Bill Historical Center."

He was inducted into the Monster Kid Hall Of Fame at the Rondo Hatton Classic Horror Awards.
