= V Live (disambiguation) =

V Live may refer to:

- V Live (album), by Vitalic (2007)
- V Live, a South Korean live video streaming service
- V-live, another term for virtual concert

== See also ==
- V (Live album), 2001
