= Vitalic =

French electronic music producer (born 1976)

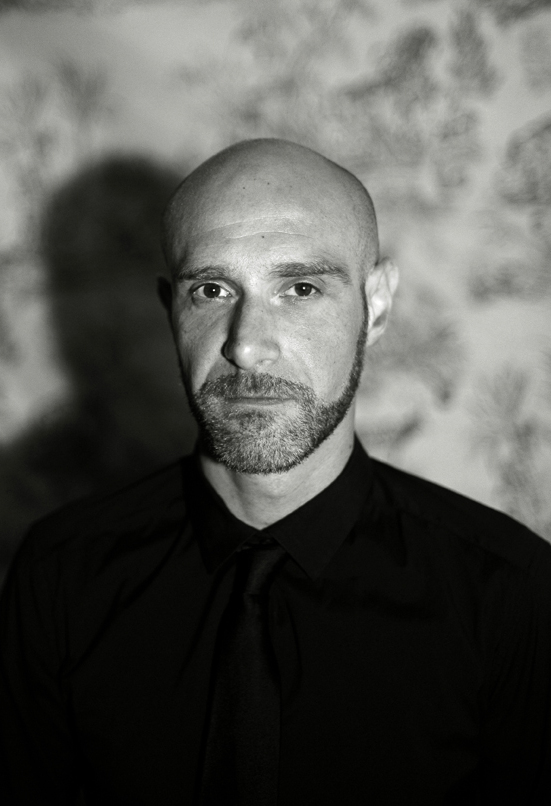
- Vitalic, 2013

Background information
- Also known as: DIMA
- Born: Pascal Arbez-Nicolas; 18 May 1976 (age 50)
- Origin: Dijon, France
- Genres: Electro house; electroclash; techno
- Occupations: Musician; songwriter; remixer; disc jockey
- Years active: 1996–present
- Labels: Citizen; PIAS
- Website: vitalic.org

Pascal Arbez-Nicolas (French pronunciation: [paskal aʁbɛz nikɔla]; born 18 May 1976), better known by his stage name Vitalic (/ˈvɪtəlɪk/), is a French electronic music producer.

== History ==
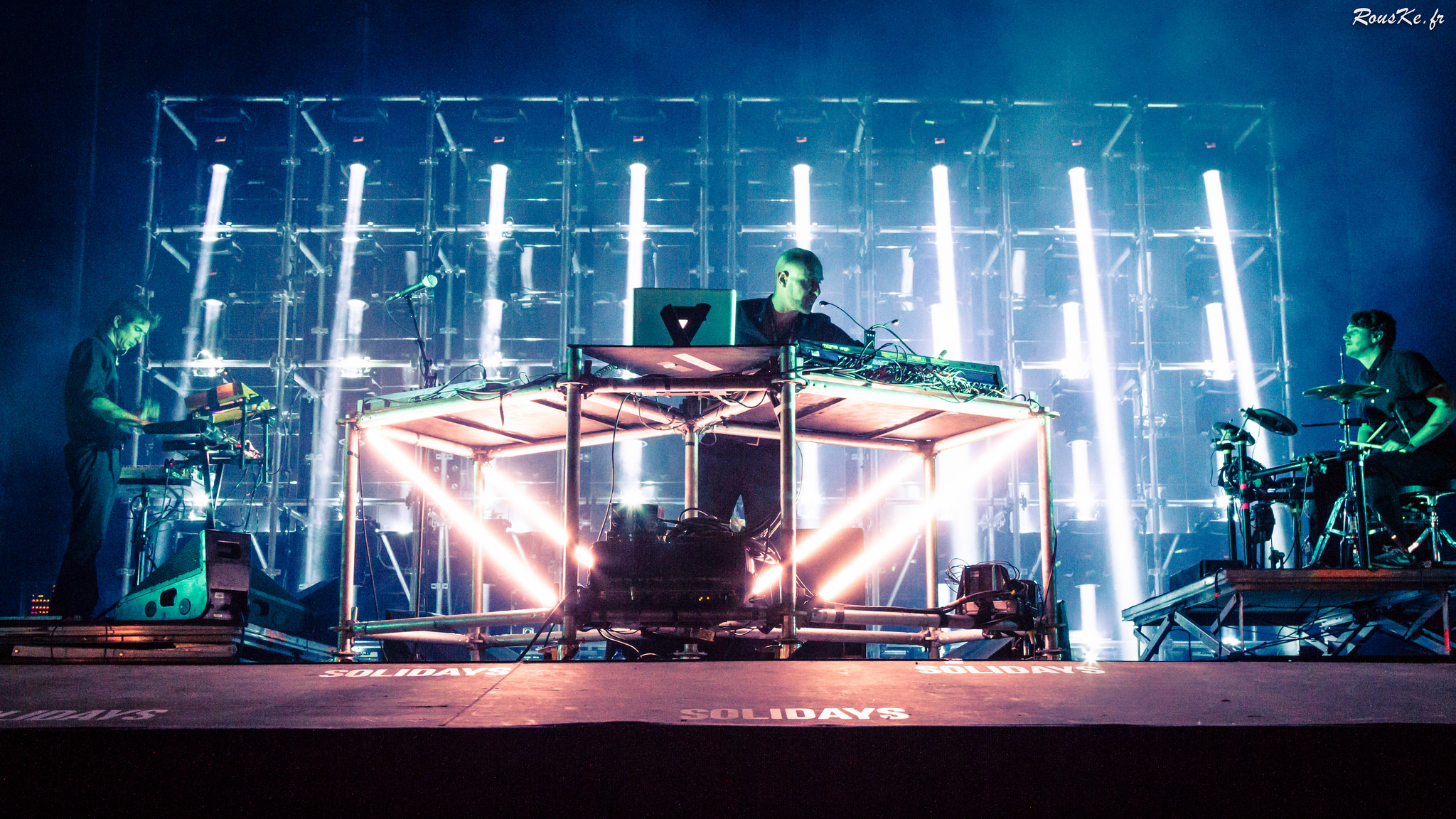
Vitalic performing in Paris in 2014

His first singles were released in 1996 and 1997, but were confined to the underground electronic music scene. However, he became good friends with techno producer The Hacker, whom he met in Le Rex Club, the "techno temple" of Laurent Garnier. The Hacker suggested that he should send his new tracks to DJ Hell, head of International DeeJay Gigolo Records in Munich. Pascal did so, and International DeeJay Gigolo Records released the well known Poney EP in 2001, which was a huge success shortly after its release. With the track "La Rock 01", Vitalic created a club anthem which was a hit in the summer of 2001. The track was also included on many compilation albums, even rock compilations. Miss Kittin included "La Rock 01" on her DJ mix album On the Road.

In 2005, Vitalic released his debut album, OK Cowboy, on Different/PIAS Recordings. Pascal states that all of the instruments used in the album are synthesized. His official website states that "the only thing he can't fake is the emotion that galvanizes his music."

His song "Trahison" from OK Cowboy was used in the trailer for the 2007 French film Naissance des Pieuvres. His song "Poney Part 1" was featured in the Pleix film Birds. It was announced by Festival Republic that Vitalic would be playing both the Reading and Leeds Festivals in the UK in August 2009.

Vitalic's second studio album Flashmob was released on 28 September 2009. The first single, "Your Disco Song" was available for streaming at Vitalic's MySpace page. He has spoken a great deal about the new disco influence on Flashmob. The song "Poison Lips" from Flashmob was used in the 2012 film Dredd, and for a 2016 TV advertisement for Amazon. Flashmob also provided the soundtrack for the film La leggenda di Kaspar Hauser.

Vitalic's third studio album, Rave Age, was released on 5 November 2012, to generally positive reviews.

In late 2016, Vitalic began a new live tour across Europe ahead of the release of his fourth studio album, Voyager, which was released on 20 January 2017, to positive reviews.

In 2021, he released a new album Dissidaence Episode 1: it was also issued on vinyl via Vitalic's official website. He also did a one-off collaboration with singer Emel Mathlouthi for a concert in Paris at Théâtre du Châtelet : they created together a new music around the poetry of Ghada Al-Samman for an event called Variations. The show was filmed for Culturebox channel and uploaded on YouTube. Vitalic has started a worldwide tour to support Dissidaence Episode 1.

In 2024, he received the Lumière Award for Best Music for his soundtrack to Disco Boy (2023).

== Discography ==
=== Albums ===
==== Studio albums ====
- OK Cowboy (2005)
- Flashmob (2009)
- Rave Age (2012)
- Voyager (2017)
- Dissidænce Episode 1 (2021)
- Dissidænce Episode 2 (2022)
- Disco Boy Original Soundtrack (2023)

==== Live albums ====
- V Live (2007)

=== Singles / EPs ===
- Poney EP (2001)
- "To L'An-fer From Chicago" (2003)
- "Fanfares" (2004)
- "My Friend Dario" (2005)
- "No Fun" (2005)
- "Poney" (2006)
- "Bells EP" (2006) with Linda Lamb
- "Disco Terminateur EP" (2009)
- "Poison Lips" (2009)
- "Second Lives" (2010)
- "Remix del Blankito from Turiaso" (2011)
- "Stamina" (2013)
- "Fade Away" (2013)
- "Film Noir" (2016)
- "Waiting For The Stars" (2017)
- "Use It or Lose It" (2017)
- "Tu Conmigo" (2017)
- "Carbonized" (2021)
- "14 AM" (2021)
- "Rave Against the System" feat. Kiddy Smile (2021)
- "The Light Is a Train" (2022)
- "Boomer OK - Radio Edit" (2022)
- "And It Goes Like" (2022)
- "Disco Boy, The Rising" (2023)
- "Confess EP" (2023)
- "Cœur Noir" feat. NTO (2024)

=== Remixes ===
Year	Artist	Title
2002	Lady B	"Swany"
2002	Slam feat. Dot Allison	"Visions"
2002	A Number Of Names	"Shari Vari" (The Hacker & Vitalic Remix)
2002	Miss Kittin & The Hacker	"1982"
2002	Demon vs. Heartbreaker	"You Are My High"
2002	Manu le Malin	"Ghost Train"
2003	Giorgio Moroder	"The Chase"
2004	Basement Jaxx	"Cish Cash"
2005	Daft Punk	"Technologic"
2005	Björk	"Who Is It"
2005	Röyksopp	"What Else Is There?"
2006	Moby	"Go"
2006	Detroit Grand Pubahs & Dave the Hustler	"Go Ahead" (Vitalic Garage Mix)
2007	Teenage Bad Girl	"Hands Of A Stranger" (Vitalic Re-edit)
2007	Crash Course In Science	"Cardboard Lamb"
2008	Heartsrevolution	"Ultraviolence"
2009	Birdy Nam Nam	"The Parachute Ending"
2009	Heartbreak	"We're Back"
2010	Jean Michel Jarre	"La Cage"
2010	Jean Michel Jarre	"Erosmachine"
2010	Amadou & Mariam	"Sabali"
2011	The Dø	"Slippery Slope"
2011	Sexy Sushi	"Oublie Moi"
2013	Vitalic	"Fade Away" ("Vitalic Formentera Remix")
2018	Steve Angello	"Rejoice" (feat. T.D. Jakes)
2019	PauloR	"Spaceship" (Vitalic Remix)
2021	Louisahhh	"Love Is a Punk"
2022	Mylène Farmer	"A tout jamais" ("D Remix - Distortion Remix by Vitalic")
2022	Mylène Farmer	"Rayon vert" ("Green Ray's Remix by Vitalic")

Under the alias DIMA:

- "Fuckeristic EP" Poetry, Soaked and Mobile Square 1999
- "Take A Walk", Bolz Bolz
- "Fadin' Away", The Hacker
- "The Realm", C'hantal
- "You Know", Hustler Pornstar
- "The Essence Of It", Elegia
- "U Know What U Did Last Summer", Hustler Pornstar
- "Ice Breaker", Scratch Massive
- "My Friend Dario", Vitalic (2005)
- "Red X", Useless

=== Associated projects ===
- Dima
- Hustler Pornstar
- The Silures, with Linda Lamb and Mount Sims
- Vital Ferox, with Al Ferox
- KOMPROMAT, with Rebeka Warrior
