= OK Cowboy =

Studio album by Vitalic
- Released: April 4, 2005
- Recorded: 2003–2004 in Dijon, France
- Genre: Electro house
- Length: 52:43 (first disc only)
- Label: Citizen Records, PIAS
- Producer: Vitalic (Pascal Arbez-Nicolas)

Vitalic chronology
OK Cowboy (2005)	V Live (2007)

OK Cowboy is the debut album of Vitalic, first released in 2005. In 2006, a collector’s edition was issued featuring a second enhanced CD with additional tracks

In 2012 it was awarded a gold certification from the Independent Music Companies Association which indicated sales of at least 75,000 copies throughout Europe.

== Inspiration and production ==
Pascal Arbez said in an interview with MusicRadar that "I was only using a very basic and punk studio setup" for this album. "Polkamatic" was composed as a lullaby for his first son, born during the making of the album. For the track "Repair Machines", he was trying to emulate the style of Chris Korda's vocal sampling. "The Past" was inspired by Jean-Michel Jarre.

== Reception ==
Professional ratings
Aggregate scores
Source	Rating
Metacritic	82/100
Review scores
Source	Rating
AllMusic	4/5 stars
Entertainment Weekly	B
The Guardian	4/5 stars
The Irish Times	4/5 stars
NME	9/10
Pitchfork	8.6/10
Q	2/5 stars
Spin	B+
Uncut	4/5 stars
URB	4/5 stars

Critical reception to the album was generally positive, with the album receiving a score of 82 at Metacritic. The music review online magazine Pitchfork placed OK Cowboy at number 184 on their list of top 200 albums of the 2000s.

== Track listing ==
1. "One Billion Dollar Studio" (hidden track, requires manual rewind) – 1:23
  "Polkamatic" – 1:52
2. "Poney Part 1" – 5:22
3. "My Friend Dario" – 3:37
4. "Wooo" – 3:52
5. "La Rock 01" – 5:25
6. "The Past" – 4:27
7. "No Fun" – 3:36
8. "Poney Part 2" – 5:12
9. "Repair Machines" – 3:45
10. "Newman" – 4:50
11. "Trahison" – 4:31
12. "U and I" – 3:39
13. "Valletta Fanfares" – 2:24

=== 2006 re-release bonus disc ===
1. "Repair Machine" (discomix)
2. "You Are My Sun"
3. "Suicide Commando"
4. "Juliet India"
5. "Bells" (featuring Linda Lamb)
6. "Warm Leatherette" (live)
7. "My Friend Dario" (Dima prefers newbeat mix)
8. "Fanfares"
9. "Candy"
10. "One Billion Dollar Studio"
