= Steve Holland (actor) =

American actor

- Born: Thomas Philip Hollands; January 8, 1925; Seattle, Washington, US
- Died: May 10, 1997 (aged 72); Arcata, California, US
- Occupations: Model; Actor
- Spouse: Betty Dalores Miller(aka Gina Holland) (m. 1945)

Steve Holland (born Thomas Philip Hollands; January 8, 1925 – May 10, 1997) was an American actor and male paperback, magazine, and fashion model.

== Early life ==
Steve was born Thomas Philip Hollands on January 8, 1925, in Seattle, Washington, the third child born to Louise Teeda (née Carlson; 1904–1985) and Wilbur John Hollands (1903–1957). Holland had two older brothers, Theodore (1921–1995) and Wilbur (1923–?), and one younger brother Kenneth (1926–1985). His father worked as a rivet heater in the ship yards of Seattle as a teenager before becoming a cook with the railroads at which time the family had moved to Covina, California. By the time Holland turned 15 his father was committed to a state mental hospital in Steilacoom, Washington where he would live out the remainder of his life.

== Career ==
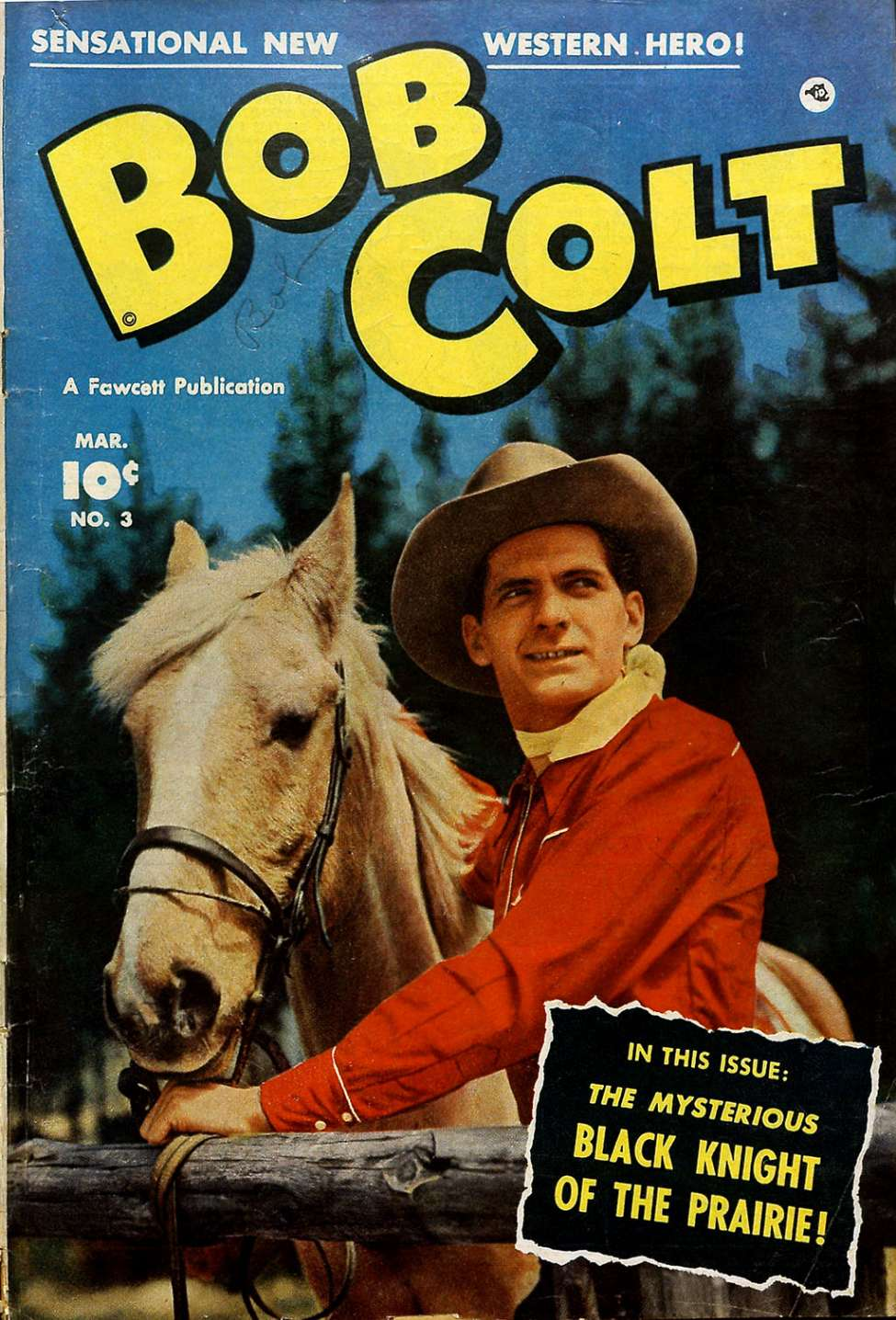
Bob Colt #3 (March 1951)

Before his acting credits, Holland was the model for Fawcett Comics' fictitious B-Western comics cowboy Bob Colt, which ran for ten issues in the early 1950s.

Holland played Flash Gordon in the 1954 television series of the same name. The television show ran 39 episodes. He had a cameo appearance in the 1953 movie The Court-Martial of Billy Mitchell.

His best-known model role was for artist James Bama's illustrations of the character Doc Savage used on the covers of the paperback reprints of the 1960s. Bama called him "the world's greatest male model." His facial features were also used in the 1970s reprint of the original pulp Avenger novels. Holland was also the model for Mack Bolan of The Executioner novels.
