= Margaret Sandbach =

English poet and novelist

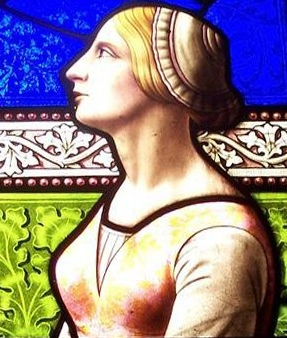
Stained glass window depicting Margaret Sandbach

Margaret Sandbach (28 April 1812 – 23 June 1852) was an English poet and novelist.

== Life ==
Born Margaret Roscoe in Liverpool on 28 April 1812, her parents were the merchant Edward Roscoe and his wife and second cousin, Margaret Lace, who was a botanical illustrator and author. She had two brothers, one of whom died in infancy, and the other of whom was Edward Henry Roscoe, with whom she was very close. Their paternal grandfather was the historian William Roscoe and her family were prominent members of Unitarian society in Liverpool.

Margaret married Henry Robertson Sandbach on 4 May 1832. He was then living at Hafodunos, an estate in Denbighshire, North Wales, that had been bought two years previously by his father, the slave-owner, merchant and Mayor of Liverpool, Samuel Sandbach. In time, her husband became a Justice of the Peace for Caernarvonshire and, in 1855, like his father, High Sheriff of Denbighshire.

Margaret's mother's book Floral Illustrations of the Seasons had been published in 1829. Her own first book was Poems, written in 1840 and dedicated to her brother Edward. Her primary literary theme throughout her career was that of the brother-sister relationship, although one of her best efforts - "The Appeal of the Wounded Amazon", contained in Poems - was inspired by the Welsh sculptor John Gibson, who had been assisted in his early career by William Roscoe and whom she and Henry had befriended in Rome in the 1830s. Gibson was the dedicatee of a later collection, Aurora and Other Poems, that was published in 1850, and in 1851 she commenced writing his autobiography, based on his dictation, while he was staying as a guest at Hafodunos. This last project came to nothing because Gibson had to return to Rome upon the death of his brother and Margaret was increasingly unwell with breast cancer.

Although she did write some fiction, notably Hearts in Mortmain (1850), it was in poetry that Sandbach excelled. Her novel Spiritual Alchemy, published in 1851, caused Elizabeth Gaskell to comment in a review on "the folly exhibited by many an author of a moderately successful novel who hurries forward the second on the reputation of the first".

Sandbach died at home on 23 June 1852 and was buried at nearby Llangernyw.

== Recognition ==
Sandbach's initial documentation of Gibson's life, together with letters between them as friends, formed a significant part of Elizabeth Eastlake's Life of John Gibson, R. A., Sculptor, published in 1870.

The historian Mark Baker and the singer Linda Lamb collaborated on a collection of songs based on the poems of Sandbach, and Lamb released an album title The Daughter of Fire and Water. Baker and Dewi Gregory also co-authored a book based on her life, published in 2013 as Margaret Sandbach: A Tragedy in Marble and Ink.
