= Hafodunos =

House in Llangernyw, Conwy, Wales

Hafodunos Hall
- Plasty Hafodunos
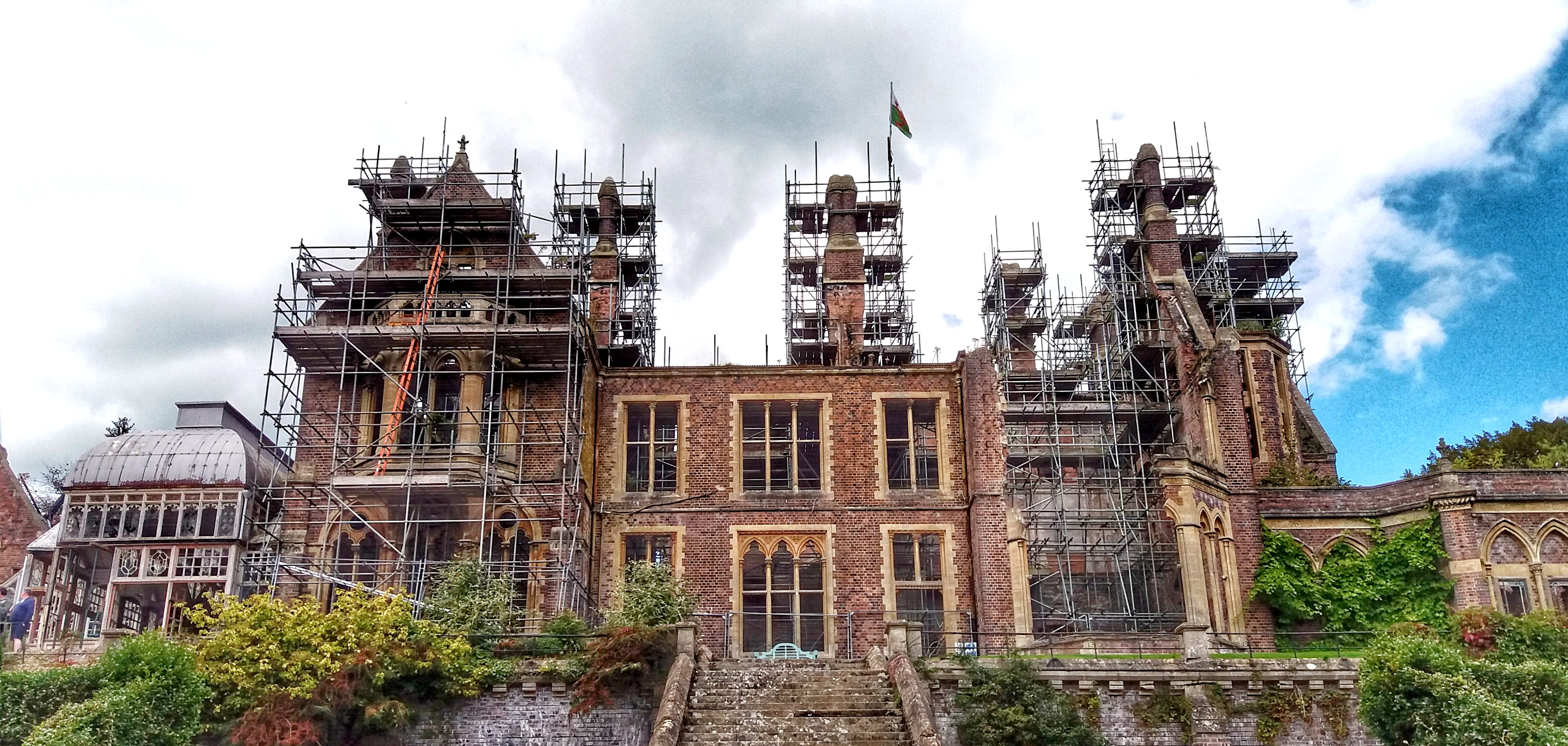
- Hafodunos undergoing restoration in 2017

- Location within Wales

General information
- Type: Private house
- Architectural style: Venetian Gothic Revival
- Location: Llangernyw, Conwy County Borough, Wales
- Coordinates: 53.1883°N 3.6964°W
- Construction started: 1861
- Completed: 1866
- Destroyed: Partial damage: 13 October 2004
- Owner: Private owner

Technical details
- Structural system: Brick and stone

Design and construction
- Architect: Sir George Gilbert Scott

Hafodunos Hall (Welsh: Plasty Hafodunos) is a Gothic Revival house located near the village of Llangernyw in Conwy County Borough, Wales. Designed by Sir George Gilbert Scott, it was built between 1861 and 1866 for Henry Robertson Sandbach, replacing a house that had been built in 1674.

The house, of Venetian Gothic design, is considered Scott's second most important country house after Kelham Hall, Nottinghamshire, and arguably his most important Welsh building. Subject to a devastating fire in 2004, the ruins are currently being restored by a private owner. Hafodunos is a Grade I listed building. The grounds are a Registered Park and Garden with many of the buildings and structures in the grounds having their own listings.

== History ==
The site has been occupied since at least 1530 and a hall was built there in 1674, but the remains of houses prior to the present buildings are untraceable. The present Hafodunos Hall was designed in a Gothic Revival style by Sir Gilbert Scott, and built between 1861 and 1866 for Henry Robertson Sandbach, whose father, the slave-owner and merchant Samuel Sandbach, had bought the estate in 1830. Hafodunos is the only example of Scott's country house style in Wales and was the second domestic structure that was built by him, the first being Kelham Hall in Nottinghamshire. One of his sons, John Oldrid Scott, who was also an architect, was later employed in 1883 to design the elaborate conservatories. Major-General Arthur Edmund Sandbach CB DSO (1859–1928), a British Army general officer was born at the Hall.

The Sandbach family sold the house in the early 1930s but still farm part of the estate. The former politician Antoinette Sandbach lived in the area while serving in the National Assembly for Wales.

Following the sale by the Sandbach family, Hafodunos subsequently housed Kent House School for Girls, which was based in Sale but acquired Hafodunos as a site for evacuation during World War II. The gymnasium/theatre and games pavilion were added to the grounds during the years of school ownership, which ended with its closure in 1969. Hafodunos became an accountancy college in the 1970s and was subsequently owned by Caer Rhun Hall. It was then used as a residential home for the elderly, which saw the addition of a lift to the main corridor of the house. The residential home was shut down in 1993 and the unused building then fell victim to dry rot which had spread rapidly through the servants' quarters into the main house.

In 1994 two businessmen attempted to open a gay hotel and private country club in the building, entitled Saville Park. They claimed it would be "5-star haven for wealthy homosexuals" and sold £5000 advance lifetime memberships to the club in order to raise the funds needed to secure the project. The memberships were advertised through teletext and adverts in gay magazines. The adverts promised à la carte dining, private gardens, 24-hour surveillance, a sauna, a massage parlour and a health and fitness suite.

The club was due to open in April 1995, but was delayed until 30 June the same year. The planning permission for the building expired in July 1994, and was not renewed. The owners blamed bad publicity for the delays.

In 1998 Conwy County Council were contemplating serving an Urgent Works Notice but the owner had died and left the estate in debt. Hafodunos was put up for sale again and was eventually bought in 2001 by a property developer from Colwyn Bay. During the late spring of 2004 he unveiled plans for a hotel and adjoining caravan park.

=== Fire ===
On the night of 13 October 2004, Hafodunos Hall was the subject of a devastating fire which gutted the main block of the house, although the conservatories and service wing were virtually untouched. Along with 40 other historic sites in Wales, the hall was featured on the ITV Wales television channel, and identified as at risk from vandalism, damage and neglect. Two men from North Wales were sentenced for the arson attack.

After the fire, Hafodunos and its gardens fell into neglect. A book, entitled Hafodunos: Triumph of the Martyr was published by Mark Baker in 2005, detailing the history of the estate. Those remaining sculptures from the house were removed in 2005 and the property was put up for sale in April 2008 with a guide price of £500,000 – £750,000. At that time, the surviving features included a gate lodge (listed Grade II), a carriage drive, the ruins of the hall (listed Grade I), a keeper's cottage (listed Grade II), a games pavilion, a gymnasium/theatre, approximately 60 acres (24 ha) of fields, formal gardens (listed Grade II), woodland and a walled garden (listed Grade II). The property was eventually sold in January 2010 for £390,000, with the new owners expressing a desire to restore the hall for use as a single dwelling.

== Design ==
Hafodunos is a Venetian-inspired house in the Gothic style, "arguably, (Scott's) most important work in Wales". The house is of two storeys, with attics and an entrance tower. The materials used to build the house are a soft red brick with a diaper, flushwork design and extensive stone dressings to windows and doors. The south east elevation known as the garden front is the most impressive side of the house, with the octagonal sculpture gallery to the north east, the entrance front tower also on the north east elevation and the conservatories and service quarters to the south west. The Hall is a Grade I listed building, with many of the structures in the grounds having their own listings, mainly Grade II. The gardens and grounds are listed at Grade II on the Cadw/ICOMOS Register of Parks and Gardens of Special Historic Interest in Wales.

The interior of the hall was as lavish as the exterior. The most notable features are a series of plaster bas-reliefs designed by John Gibson, an international sculptor from Conwy who trained in Rome, and Bertel Thorvaldsen. Gibson was a close friend of the Sandbach family. There are also five more marble reliefs by Gibson from the house, and a statue of a Nymph by R. J. Wyatt, which are now at the Walker Art Gallery in Liverpool.

== See also ==
- Margaret Sandbach
