= Hejji =

Short-lived 1935 comic strip

Dr. Seuss' Hejji (April 7, 1935)

Hejji is an American comic strip, an early work and the only comic strip by children's author Dr. Seuss (pseudonym of Theodor Geisel). Hejji was produced by Geisel during the Great Depression, two years before the publication of his first book.

Distributed by William Randolph Hearst's King Features Syndicate, Hejji began publication on April 7, 1935, as a Sunday strip. The comic strip was canceled after only three months, with the final comic published on June 23, 1935.

== Characters and story ==
The title character was a traveler who, in the first strip, entered the strange land of Baako, which had whales swimming in water-filled volcano craters, a flower broadcasting music and twin goats sharing a single beard. Hejji inadvertently plucks the sacred Trumpet Flower and is promptly arrested. He is taken to the palace of the Mighty One, who has Hejji thrown to the Seven Deadly Wombats. After Hejji escapes, the Mighty One apologizes and gives him a guided tour of Baako. They encounter various creatures and eventually arrive at the mysterious castle of the Evil One.

== Recycling characters ==
Characters and situations from Hejji reappeared in Geisel's later work. For example, the two goats with the single beard reappeared in the musical fantasy film The 5,000 Fingers of Dr. T., scripted by Geisel.
