= David Zábranský =

Czech writer (born 1977)

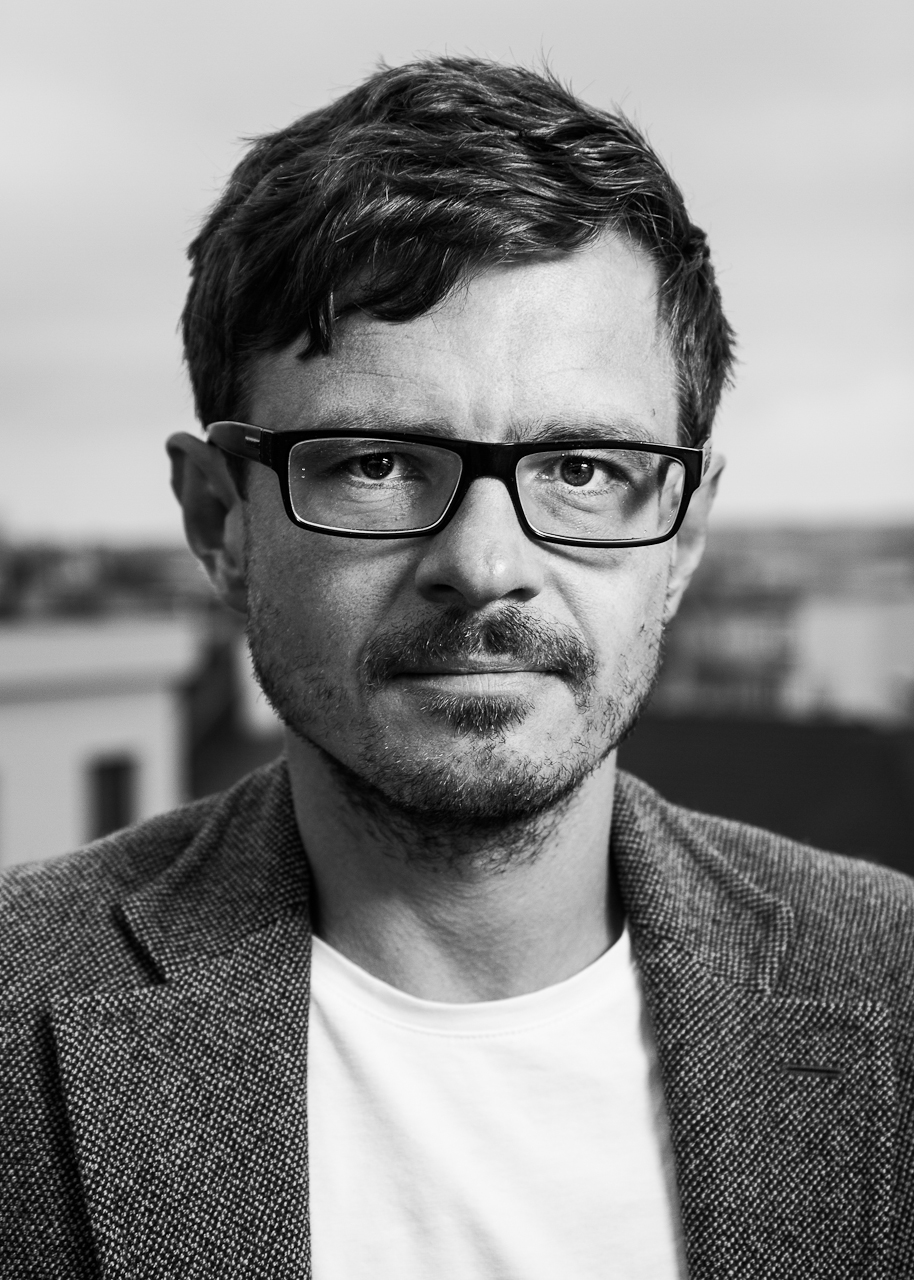
- David Zábranský (2015)
- Born: 3 March 1977 (age 49); Prague, Czechoslovakia
- Education: Charles University
- Occupation: Writer
- Writing career
- Notable work: Slabost pro každou jinou pláž (Any Beach But This)
- Notable awards: Magnesia Litera (Newcomer of the Year)

David Zábranský (born 3 March 1977, in Prague) is a Czech writer.

== Education and career ==
Zábranský finished Media studies and Law at Charles University in Prague. He practiced law, but only in the NGO sector. He worked for The Counselling Centre For Citizenship/Civil and Human Rights, for Organization for Aid to Refugees or for The League of Human Rights.

The author's first book Slabost pro každou jinou pláž (Any Beach But This) was awarded the Magnesia Litera in the Newcomer of the year category.

He is a volunteer with the Berg Orchestra. Between 2015 and 2017, Zábranský worked as an editor-in-chief at CzechLit, Czech Literature Online. His texts were translated into Spanish, German, Hungarian and other languages.

== Works in Czech ==
(Translations of titles for informational purposes only.)

- Slabost pro každou jinou pláž, 2006 - Any Beach But This - (novel)
- Šternův pokus milovat, 2008 - Stern's Attempt to Love - (novel)
- Kus umělce, 2010 - Piece of an Artist - (novella)
- Hudba! Konečně!, 2011 - Music! Finally! - (radio play)
- Declassé (Lekce pro učitele), 2011 short story - Declessé - (short story)
- Edita Farkaš, 2011 - Edita Farkas - (novella)
- Edita Farkaš*, 2012 - Edita Farkas*- (novella)
- Martin Juhás čili Československo, 2015 - Martin Juhas or Czechoslovakia - (novel)
- Herec a truhlář Majer mluví o stavu své domoviny, 2016 - Actor and Carpenter Majer speaks about the State of his Homeland - (stage play)
- Za Alpami, 2017 - Beyond the Alps - (novel)
- Logoz, 2019 - (novel)
