= Sigurd Lybeck =

Norwegian writer (1895–1975)

Sigurd Lybeck (25 September 1895 – 5 November 1975) was a Norwegian writer. He is most commonly associated with his writing featuring the popular literary figure, Jens von Bustenskjold.

== Biography ==
Lybeck was born in Etnedal Municipality in Christians amt (county), Norway. He was the youngest of four brothers raised on the Lybekk farm. He received training in Kristiania (now called Oslo) and was employed as a forest worker.

He also wrote several popular novels and stories, mostly published as feuilletons in newspapers and magazines. He wrote in a popular humorous sequel style. His breakthrough was the series De giftegalne kaller i Oladalen, published in Arbeidermagasinet in 1928. He is particularly remembered as the creator of the fictional character Jens von Bustenskjold from the rural valley of Oladalen. Lybeck was the author of the series which was illustrated by Anders Bjørgaard (1891–1967) and appeared in Arbeidermagasinet from 1935. Bustenskjold also was the main character in a comic book series published between 1934 and 1970. The 1958 comedy film Bustenskjold by director Helge Lunde (1900–1987) was based on this series and had comic actor Leif Juster (1910–1995) playing the title character.

== Selected works ==
- Ragnhild Skaalien. Et sagn fra Valdres, 1922
- Rydningsmand, 1924
- Folk nord i grenda, 1944
- På villstrå, 1945
- Trollhegg, 1946
- Den ensomme striden. Fortelling fra en fjellbygd, 1947
- Marte fra Hulderhaugen, 1950
- Matja. Fortellingen om en mor, 1967
- Tore Navarhaugens store kjærlighet. 1989
- Gull-Dora og de to knarkene i Åsbygda, 1992

== Other sources ==
- Lybeck, Torodd (1995). Minneskrift for Sigurd Lybeck: 1895-1995 (in Norwegian).
- Haganæs, Jul (1989). En folkets forteller : Sigurd Lybeck, etnedølen som skapte Bustenskjold (in Norwegian). Oslo: Grøndahl og Dreyer. ISBN 8250417127.
