= Mark Baker (author) =

British writer

- Education: Rydal Penrhos; Bangor University (BA); Cardiff University (MA, PhD)
- Occupations: Architectural historian and author
- Years active: 1997–present

Mark Baker is an architectural historian and author of several books on country houses, estates, and their families. Baker has contributed to several television series and programmes. He became a Welsh Conservative Party councillor for Gele in May 2017.

== Early years and education ==
Baker was educated at Rydal Penrhos School, Colwyn Bay. He later attended the University of Wales, Bangor, graduating in 2006 with a BA in history and archaeology. Baker's MA from Cardiff University focused on the Gothic Revival in Wales.

Baker then undertook PhD studies researching the development of Welsh Country Houses, during which he discovered the earliest known image of Hafod Uchtryd, Devil's Bridge. Baker was made a member of the National Trust Committee for Wales in 2009 (later renamed the Wales Advisory Board). In 2011, Baker curated "Welsh Architecture from the Salisbury Collection: A Selection of Original Artworks" from Cardiff University archives.

== Gwrych Castle Preservation Trust ==
In 1997, Baker founded ASFOG (A Society For the Friends of Gwrych). The organization changed its name in 2001 to Gwrych Castle Preservation Trust and became a registered charity. The Trust aims to raise awareness of Gwrych's plight and also to establish a solution for the conservation and preservation of the castle. Baker spearheaded a campaign for the building's restoration that proved fruitful when the Trust precipitated the sale of the castle by pursuing compulsory purchase action. He was subsequently made the youngest honorary life member of SAVE Britain's Heritage.

== Historical research ==
Baker's first book was published at the age of 13 in 1999 on the rise and fall of Gwrych Castle, Abergele by Gwasg Helygain. Baker went on to publish further books on Gwrych Castle in 2000, 2003 and 2006. Through research at the Royal Institute of British Architects it was discovered that the marble staircase at Gwrych Castle had been designed by Detmar Blow as part of a major refurbishment of the castle in 1914. This research was presented as a lecture at the National Museum of Wales, Cathays Park, Cardiff, as part of their St. David's Day celebrations in 2012.

In 2005 Baker published a history of Hafodunos, Llangernyw, a Victorian gothic building and the only example of domestic architecture to be built in Wales by George Gilbert Scott.

Baker published a detailed study of Plas Teg, near Mold, in 2006.

Baker's A Royal Home in Wales: Llwynywermod was the first book to explore the history of The Prince of Wales’ home in Wales, which he had purchased in 2006. It details the history of the Llwynywermod estate and was commissioned by the Welsh Historic Gardens Trust.

In March 2013, Baker was appointed historical researcher for S4C living history television series, Y Plas. The research was based on Baker's PhD thesis and featured houses such as Llanerchaeron, Gwrych Castle, Hafodunos, Plas Teg and Brynkir. In November 2013, to coincide with the broadcast of the television series, a book titled Y Plas: The Story of the Welsh Country House was published, co-authored by Baker, Dewi Gregory and Sian Price.

Baker worked with Linda Lamb on a collection of songs based on the poems of Margaret Sandbach of Hafodunos which was released as an album in 2012. Sandbach was a prolific author and playwright who died of breast cancer in 1852. With the aid of an Arts Council of Wales grant, Baker and Gregory wrote a book based on her life, published in 2013.

== Brynkir, Dolbenmaen ==
In 2012, Baker led a Cardiff University archaeological dig at Plas Brynkir, Dolbenmaen, in order to record the historic fabric of the two mansion houses. Again, in 2013, Baker excavated Brynkir and discovered that the site had originated as a deer park, possibly created by Llywelyn the Great as part of a wider hunting landscape associated with the royal court at Dolbenmaen. The project featured collaborations with a variety of groups and organizations.

After a third season of excavation in 2014, a collection of academic essays was published by historic buildings charity, Love My Wales, with Baker acting as editor.

The artwork of J. Walter Richards, which had been discovered by Baker in 2013, was featured in displays throughout Llandudno for the duration of the LLAWN02 festival.

== Heritage campaigning ==
On 1 September 2008, Forgotten Welsh Houses was published, sponsored by the Georgian Group and SAVE Britain's Heritage. To coincide with this release, the Georgian Group commissioned Baker to research and write Welsh Country Houses Illustrated. Baker is a regular commentator on Welsh architectural and heritage matters. He has presented at the Hay Festival.

=== Television ===
Forgotten Welsh Houses formed the basis for BBC One's 'Hidden Homes of Wales', broadcast in 2010, and ITV Wales's Grand Declines, broadcast in 2012.

== Published works ==
- 1999 The rise and fall of Gwrych Castle. Prestatyn: Mark Baker.
- 2000 Gwrych Castle, Abergele and Llanddulas – A pictorial history. Prestatyn: Mark Baker.
- 2003 The rise and fall of Gwrych Castle, including Winifred, Countess of Dundonald – a biography. Prestatyn: Mark Baker.
- 2005 Hafodunos Hall, Llangernyw – Triumph of the Martyr. Prestatyn: Mark Baker.
- 2006 The Myths and Legends of the Gwrych Castle Estate. Prestatyn: Brampton House Publishing.
- 2006 Plas Teg – A Jacobean Country House. Hope: Brampton House Publishing. (Revised Second Edition released 2007)
- 2007 Abergele & District – A Pictorial Past. Cardiff: Brampton House Publishing. (With Michael Roberts)
- 2008 Forgotten Welsh Houses. Llanrwst: Hendre House Publishing.
- 2008 A Royal Home in Wales: Llwynywermod. Cardiff: Accent Press.
- 2008 Welsh Country Houses Illustrated. London: Georgian Group.
- 2013 Y Plas: Story of the Welsh Country House. Cardiff: Truth Department.(With Dewi Gregory and Sian Price)
- 2013 Margaret Sandbach: A Tragedy in Marble and Ink. Abergele: Gwrych Castle Preservation Trust (With Dewi Gregory)
- 2014 Plas Brynkir, Dolbenmaen. Cardiff: Love My Wales. (Editor)
- 2015 Fifty Buildings that Built Wales. Cardiff: Graffeg. (With David Wilson and Greg Stevenson)
