= My Friend Dario =

Single by Vitalic

from the album OK Cowboy
- Released: March 29, 2005
- Genre: Electronica, electroclash
- Label: Different/Pias
- Songwriter(s): Pascal Arbez-Nicolas

Music video
- "Vitalic - My friend Dario" at YouTube

"My Friend Dario" is the first single from Vitalic's debut album, OK Cowboy. It is the first single from Vitalic to use "Brigitte", a vocal synthesis program. "No Fun", which is another track on OK Cowboy, also uses Brigitte.

The music video for "My Friend Dario" features a band mimicking instrumentation; the guitarists play air guitar and the drummer air drums. The lack of band instruments in the video reflect a statement made on Vitalic's website; that the instruments on his album OK Cowboy are entirely synthesized and that "the only thing he can't fake is the emotion that galvanizes his music."

The maxi-CD version of the single includes a live cover of Daniel Miller's "Warm Leatherette", performed on BBC Radio 1. The cover was later included in a collector's edition of OK Cowboy.

In an interview with Pascal Arbez in CMJ New Music Monthly, Arbez dialogued:

[Interviewer:] What can your alterego "Dario" do that you haven't been able to do?
[Interviewee:] When he finally has a crash, because he drives like a brainless kid, he dies. But it is not real because it is just a song. It has no impact. As far as I am concerned, I try to make my own excesses, which are real, not leading to a sad end.
[Interviewer:] But you've gotten a few speeding tickets lately. So are you and Dario becoming the same person?
[Interviewee:] Sometime we are. Dario is just the concept name of a part of myself. It is convenient to have these names to point out in an easy way how I feel or how my behavior is at a precise moment. Instead of saying, "Oh, you are acting like a stupid drunk and please don't take the car," my friends would say, "Arrête de faire ton Dario!" ["Stop acting like Dario!"]

The song appears in the EA video games FIFA 06 and Need for Speed: Carbon (plays only when driving a tuner car). It also features in Riders Republic, developed by Ubisoft Annecy.

It was also used as a catwalk soundtrack for both Versace and Chanel’s Fall/Winter 2005 show.

== Single track listing ==
12"

1. "My Friend Dario" (extended mix) – 4:38
2. "My Friend Dario" (Dima prefers new beat mix) – 5:30

CD

1. "My Friend Dario" – 3:37
2. "My Friend Dario" (extended mix) – 4:38
3. "My Friend Dario" (Dima prefers new beat mix) – 5:30
4. "Warm Leatherette" (as heard on Radio 1)
