= Harry Paschall =

American weightlifter and cartoonist (1896–1957)

Harry Barton Paschall
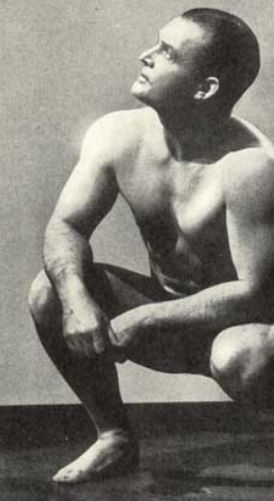
- Born: 27 November 1897 or 1896
- Died: 24 September 1957
- Resting place: Columbus, Ohio, U.S.
- Occupation(s): Weightlifter, magazine editor, cartoonist, author
- Spouse: Myrtle Paschall

Harry Paschall (27 November 1897 or 1896 – 24 September 1957) was an American weightlifter, magazine editor, cartoonist and the author of books. He was a cartoonist for Strength & Health and eventually its managing editor.

== Life ==
As a boy, Paschall was impressed by seeing the strongman Arthur Saxon. He attended Marion High School in Marion, Ohio, graduating in 1915.

Paschall began his career as a cartoonist for the Pyramid Film Company in Dayton, and worked as a commercial artist for Jay H. Maish in Marion, Ohio, and for the New York Times. By the 1920s, he became a weightlifting instructor in Marion, where he founded the Weight Lifters' Club.

Paschall was hired by Strength & Health, initially as a cartoonist; his cartoon, "Bosco," was the namesake of a strongman. In a 1949 article, he criticized Joe Weider for promoting bodybuilding, arguing that bodybuilders were not "real strength athletes." From 1955 to his death in 1957, Paschall was the managing editor of the magazine.

Paschall married Pearl V. Middleton in Marion in 1917. With his wife Myrtle, he resided in York, Pennsylvania. He died of a heart attack in September 1957, at age 59, and he was buried in Columbus, Ohio.

== Selected works ==
- Paschall, Harry B. (1950). Muscle Moulding: A Bosco Book for Advanced Bodybuilders. OCLC 877686311.
- Paschall, Harry B. (1951). Development of Strength: A Bosco Book. OCLC 18283691.
