= Flashmob (album) =

Studio album by Vitalic
- Released: 25 September 2009
- Genre: Electro house; electroclash
- Label: Different; PIAS
- Producer: Pascal Arbez-Nicolas

Vitalic chronology
OK Cowboy (2005)	Flashmob (2009)	Rave Age (2012)

Singles from Flashmob
- 1. "Disco Terminateur" Released: 17 August 2009; 2. "Poison Lips" Released: 10 November 2009; 3. "Second Lives" Released: 16 March 2010

Professional ratings
Aggregate scores
Source	Rating
Metacritic	81/100
Review scores
Source	Rating
AllMusic	4/5 stars
Drowned in Sound	8/10
The Fly	3.5/5 stars
musicOMH	4/5 stars
NME	6/10
Pitchfork	7.9/10
Q	3/5 stars
The Times	4/5 stars
Uncut	5/5 stars
XLR8R	6.5/10

Flashmob is the second studio album by French Electronic music artist Vitalic. The album was released on 25 September 2009 through PIAS Recordings. In 2012 it was awarded a double silver certification from the Independent Music Companies Association which indicated sales of at least 40,000 copies throughout Europe.

== Track listing ==
All tracks are written by Pascal Arbez-Nicolas except where noted.

No.	Title	Writer(s)	Length
1.	"See the Sea (Red)"		4:05
2.	"Poison Lips"		3:54
3.	"Flashmob"		4:28
4.	"One Above One"	Pascal Arbez-Nicolas; Judith Brick	3:41
5.	"Still"		5:24
6.	"Terminateur Benelux"		3:51
7.	"Second Lives"		4:25
8.	"Allan Dellon"		3:11
9.	"See the Sea (Blue)"		4:05
10.	"Chicken Lady"		3:27
11.	"Your Disco Song"		3:38
12.	"Station Mir 2099"		4:29
13.	"Chez Septime"		0:31

Japan bonus tracks
No.	Title	Length
14.	"Bluesy Tuesday"	4:35
15.	"Nobody Listens to Techno"	4:47

== Personnel ==
Credits adapted from liner notes.

- Pascal Arbez-Nicolas - composer, writing, performance, production
- Judeth Brick - composer, writing (4)
- Erik Schaeffer - mixing
- //DIY - artwork
