= Jens von Bustenskjold =

Norwegian comic strip

Jens von Bustenskjold is the title of a Norwegian comic strip, which appeared in Arbeidermagasinet (later renamed Magasinet For Alle) from 1934 to 1970. It's a humoristic comic about a nobleman. The series was created by Sigurd Lybeck, and illustrated by Anders Bjørgaard. It was adapted into the 1958 comedy film Bustenskjold.
