= Irene Champlin =

American actress

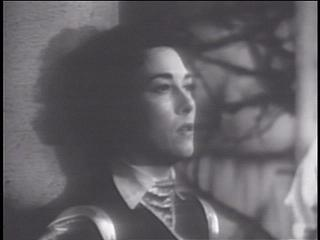
Irene Champlin as Dale Arden

Irene Champlin (born Irene Parsons; March 16, 1931 – July 10, 1990) was an American actress.

== Biography ==
She was born in Waurika, Oklahoma. Her most prominent role was as Dale Arden in the 1954–1955 syndicated television series Flash Gordon. Her portrayal of Arden has been praised for breaking from the typical damsel in distress of the earlier comic strip and film serials to present the character as a trained scientist and a "quick thinker who often saved [Flash and Dr. Zarkov] from perishing." In addition to her role as Arden, Champlin had lead roles in the stage productions Calculated Risk and For Crying Out Loud and played the female lead in the motion picture Resistance. Her other television appearances included The Perry Como Show, The United States Steel Hour, and The Guiding Light.

== Personal life ==
Champlin was married to Paul L. Field, once chairman and chief executive of Essex Communications Corp., a cable-television company in Greenwich, Connecticut. They had two daughters, Alicia Field Taylor and Christiane Field.

She died in Greenwich, Connecticut, in 1990 following an extended illness.
