= Anders Bjørgaard =

Norwegian illustrator

- Born: 18 March 1891; Holtaalen Municipality, Norway
- Died: 20 March 1967 (aged 76)
- Occupation: Illustrator

Anders Bjørgaard (18 March 1891 – 20 March 1967) was a Norwegian illustrator.

He is particularly known for drawing the comic series Jens von Bustenskjold (with text by Sigurd Lybeck), which appeared in Arbeidermagasinet from 1934 to 1970. A memorial of Bjørgaard was raised in 1970.

== Personal life ==
Bjørgaard was born in Holtaalen Municipality to Johanna Bjørgaard and Anders Bjørgaard. He was married to Johanne Sofie Olsen. He worked as a miner until 1919, when he started studying at the Norwegian National Academy of Craft and Art Industry in Kristiania.
