= Vlastimil Zábranský =

Czech artist (1936–2021)

- Born: 2 September 1936; Vráž, First Czechoslovak Republic
- Died: 4 February 2021 (aged 84); Brno, Czech Republic
- Occupation: Artist

Vlastimil Zábranský (2 September 1936 – 4 February 2021) was a Czech visual artist.

== Biography ==
Zábranský began studying at the Secondary school of Civil Engineering in Prague in 1953. He then studied at Masaryk University in Brno and the Higher Pedagogical School, where he majored in arts and Czech. He graduated in 1961 after studying under Professor Bohdan Lacina. He briefly worked as a teacher before devoting himself fully to art in 1963. He designed a set for the City Theater Zlín in 1970, collaborating with Alois Hajda and Zdeněk Hradilák. He opened his own studio on Stojanová Street in Brno, which served as a meeting place for influential people in the city. He often donated funds from auctions to charities, particularly ecological foundations. In 1970, he became a member of the Société Protectrice de l'Humour in France. In 2006, he was awarded the City of Brno Award for Fine Arts.

Zábranský's works had a subtle, dreamy technical design and he often created figural motifs. He also often included social and political criticisms such as cartoons, as seen in his naked portrayal of former President of the Czech Republic Václav Klaus. He has exhibited in Brno and across Europe on several occasions and many of his works can be found at the Prague City Gallery, the Moravian Gallery in Brno, and the World Gallery of Cartoons in Skopje.

Vlastimil Zábranský died of pneumonia and COVID-19 in Brno on 4 February 2021 at the age of 84.
