= The Spirit (animated film) =

- Directed by: Brad Bird
- Screenplay by: Brad Bird; Jerry Rees
- Produced by: Gary Kurtz
- Production company: Kinetographics
- Country: United States
- Language: English

The Spirit is an unproduced American animated neo-noir superhero film project based on the comic book character The Spirit by Will Eisner. The film was developed over the course of four and years between 1980 and 1985 by Brad Bird and Jerry Rees with Bird attached to direct the film. Producer Gary Kurtz attempted to shop the film to various Hollywood studios who praised the screenplay, but couldn't understand why the team wanted to do the project as an animated feature as it lacked many of the tropes of animation (talking animals, fairy tale settings, musical numbers, etc.) with all prospective financiers passing on the project. Despite the majority of pre-production on the film having been completed, the team ultimately decided to abandon the film to move on to other endeavors.

== Cast ==
- Denny Colt/The Spirit
- Ellen Dolan
- Ebony White
- Commissioner Dolan
- Sand Saref

== Development ==
In the 1980s, animator Brad Bird was working at Walt Disney Animation Studios and disillusioned with the current state of animation as he and other CalArts alums working at the studio felt nothing worthwhile had been done with character animation for the past two decades. Bird had become a fan of The Spirit due to its cinematic style as well as creator Will Eisner's more cartoonish character designs in comparison to other superhero works, and with the help of what few CalArts alums he could entice, including Glen Keane and Jerry Rees, Bird and his crew established an ad hoc studio called Visions Animation + Filmworks and produced a pitch trailer over the course of five months in their off hours from Disney for the purpose of showcasing it to potential producers. The Spirit pitch trailer would later be incorporated into Bird's sample film reel he called A Portfolio of Projects which included other projects such as Family Dog. Freelance publicist Steven Paul Leiva, who specialized in animators and had represented clients such as Chuck Jones, Bill Melendez, and Richard Williams, had also grown frustrated with the current state of American animation and was looking to move from publicity to producing. While attending Filmex at the Cinerama Dome in 1980, Leiva was shown the pencil test trailer Bird and his team had produced by a colleague and was impressed not only with how efficiently it told The Spirit's origin and tone of the story, but also said it had the finest human animation he'd ever seen and joined the project as a producer.

Bird sent letters and copies of the trailer to several high profile figures to pitch the project including Steven Spielberg, George Lucas, and Francis Ford Coppola, but ultimately it was producer Gary Kurtz who decided to back the project, as he was a comic book fan, and was impressed by the pitch Bird's team had produced, and was well acquainted with Leiva through their mutual association with Chuck Jones. Kurtz secured the option and took Bird and Leiva to pitch the project to Will Eisner in New York, and while Eisner was initially hesitant as he never considered having his character adapted to animation Leiva and Bird won him over with their pitch trailer and finalized the deal with Kurtz not longtherafter. While Kurtz had a high profile in the industry, following his split from Lucasfilm he no longer had any significant financial backing. Bird eventually began developing the screenplay along with Jerry Rees who had just finished work on Tron. Development on The Spirit took place over the course of several years with Bird moving his office to Kurtz' Kinetographics in Marin County, California to work on the project. Leiva joined as well as Kinetographics' Director of Animation Development overseeing not only The Spirit but also Nemo an adaptation of Winsor McCay's comic strip Little Nemo which was being co-produced with Tokyo Movie Shinsha. Bird and Rees created a full screenplay, full storyboard, as well as several individual pieces of concept art. Eisner himself was heavily involved with development attending story conferences with Bird and Rees (as the screenplay was inspired by some of Eisner's original The Spirit stories), provided model sheets, and even had veto power over the artwork prior to principal photography. Eisner even stated that the majority of pre-production on the film had been completed. During development, the presentation package put together by Bird and Rees for showcasing to potential financiers was stolen with Rees theorizing the thieves probably thought it was a musical instrument and most likely tossed it in the trash once they realized what was taken.

== Cancellation ==
Despite the clout the project had thanks to Kurtz' role in producing blockbusters like American Graffiti and the first two Star Wars films, the project ultimately didn't come to fruition as the only animated projects at the time making money were soft toy based projects like The Care Bears Movie while rumors swirled about the possible demise of Walt Disney Animation in the wake of The Black Cauldron's failure, and investors believed that even in the most ideal circumstances no animated film would ever make more than $50 million and only Disney could ever hope to approach such a benchmark which ultimately led to the project's demise. Many executives who read the script praised it but couldn't understand why they wanted to make it an animated film as it wasn't a fairy tale and didn't have any talking animals. One executive offered to buy the screenplay and make it as a live action film, but Bird refused as the whole purpose of the project was to create something to revolutionize animation.

== Legacy ==
While the film ultimately was not made, Bird would incorporate some of the stylistic techniques for this project into The Incredibles. Bird would also base much of the characterization of the titular character of Ray Gunn on The Spirit. In April 2015, Steven Paul Leiva, the producer of the film, posted the original pencil test trailer to YouTube which was sourced from an old VHS he had in storage after many curious fans and animation historians had inquired about it. In July 2026, Bird commented on the apparent similarities between The Spirit and Ray Gunn stating:

It wasn’t until later that I figured out, 'Oh, it's because you didn’t get to make The Spirit.' It's different from The Spirit in a lot of ways, but there was something about noir. Eisner was probably the most cinematic person to ever do a graphic novel. I found out about it because I loved movies: William Friedkin at one point wanted to do The Spirit and he said it’s the Citizen Kane of comic books, so that immediately hooked me. I was like, 'I gotta read The Spirit.' They started reprinting them, so I read all the reprints, and that’s how I got involved in The Spirit… but I never got to scratch that itch until now.

== Subsequent attempts ==
Paul Aratow, producer of the failed 1987 The Spirit TV pilot, said that he would like to take a second attempt at adapting The Spirit, possibly as an animated film, but that it would be dependent on Warner Bros. as they had purchased rights to The Spirit but had them in a "hold back" situation where even if they had no intention of doing anything with the property they could also choose to not let anyone else do anything until the rights expire.

In 1994, producer Michael Uslan and executive producers Benjamin Melniker and Steven Maier subsequently obtained the rights with Uslan having initially developed a pitch for an animated The Spirit feature along with a painted proof of concept poster designed by the Brothers Hildebrandt. Ultimately, Uslan's animated The Spirit adaptation was abandoned in favor of the Frank Miller directed 2008 live-action adaptation.

In January 2026, it was reported that Will Eisner's estate, run by his widow's nephew Carl Gropper and his wife Nancy, was looking to sell the entirety of Will Eisner's intellectual property including The Spirit with the sale also including a complete unpublished 72 page graphic novel Eisner had finished titled The Spirit Returns featuring The Spirit squaring off against a ruthless vigilante who has no qualms about killing. The Groppers voiced hope to find a buyer that could keep The Spirit in the public eye and voiced hope for either a live-action feature film or animated film noting that the 2008 attempt didn't make a lot of sense.

== See also ==
- The Spirit (1987 film)
- The Spirit (2008 film)
