= Life After Flash =

Documentary film by Lisa Downs

- Film poster
- Directed by: Lisa Downs
- Produced by: Ashley Pugh; Lisa Downs
- Starring: Sam J. Jones; Melody Anderson; Topol; Brian Blessed; Peter Wyngarde
- Edited by: Lisa Downs
- Music by: Toby Dunham
- Production companies: Spare Change Films; Strict Machine
- Distributed by: AMP International
- Release dates: 2 October 2017 (London); 9 April 2018 (Chattanooga)
- Running time: 94 minutes
- Country: United Kingdom
- Language: English

Life After Flash is a 2017 British documentary film directed, produced and edited by Lisa Downs.

It chronicles the making of the 1980 film version of Flash Gordon and its eventual cult following, with particular focus placed on how the life and career of the film's lead, Sam J. Jones (who also served as an executive producer on this film), was affected by his falling-out with producer Dino De Laurentiis. Aside from Jones, the film features interviews with cast members Melody Anderson, Brian Blessed, Topol, Peter Wyngarde, Richard O'Brien, Deep Roy and Peter Duncan, composers Brian May and Howard Blake, De Laurentiis' widow Martha, comic book creators Stan Lee, Alex Ross and Mark Millar, filmmaker Robert Rodriguez, and actor Patrick St. Esprit.

Life After Flash had its world premiere at Chattanooga Film Festival, followed by the European Premiere at the 72nd Edinburgh International Film Festival.

== Reception ==
On the review aggregator website Rotten Tomatoes, 88% of eight critics' reviews are positive, with an average rating of 6.8/10.

Writing for Forbes, Kristen Lopez said "Lisa Downs presents a film that says there is life after Flash Gordon and it's a pretty good life, all things considered!" Mark Millar described the film as "hilarious, moving and just maybe the best doc about Hollywood I've ever seen". C. Robert Cargill commented the documentary is "essential film geek viewing", noting that it's "touching, sweet, hilarious, and just plain cool".
