= The Spirit (1987 film) =

- Genre: Action; Adventure; Crime; Thriller
- Written by: Steven E. de Souza
- Directed by: Michael Schultz
- Starring: Sam J. Jones
- Music by: Barry Goldberg
- Country of origin: United States
- Original language: English

Production
- Producer: Paul Aratow
- Cinematography: Frank Thackery
- Editors: Tod Feuerman; Gregory Prange
- Running time: 74 minutes
- Production company: Warner Bros. Television
- Budget: $2.5 million

Original release
- Network: ABC
- Release: July 31, 1987

The Spirit is a 1987 American made-for-television action-adventure film based on the comic book character The Spirit by Will Eisner. The film went through a 10 year development cycle when producer Paul Aratow acquired the rights to the character in the mid 70s and began development on a TV movie adaptation to be produced and directed by William Friedkin for NBC as a pilot for an ongoing television series until development stalled in 1980. After an attempt at an animated film version produced by Gary Kurtz and directed by Brad Bird also failed to emerge from development, Aratow reacquired the rights and set up the pilot at ABC with director Michael Schultz and writer Steven E. de Souza. While initially intended as pilot for an ongoing television series for ABC's 1986 Fall Schedule, a change in management saw the pilot shelved until the producers managed to circulate a petition at the 1986 San Diego Comic-Con with several prominent signatories convincing ABC to air the pilot albeit with muted promotion and no chance of a series pickup.

== Plot ==
In rural East Armfit, Oregon, police officer Denny Colt rushes to the aid of his friend and mentor William Sevrin, who has been attacked and had his manuscript, The Roxton Connection: Art Crime of the Century, burned by an unknown assailant. Upon arrival, he is told by a fatally wounded Sevrin that the only one who knew about his manuscript besides Denny was Simon Teasdale. Traveling to Central City, Denny seeks out Commissioner Dolan at a fundraising event, and after meeting with Dolan's daughter, Ellen, and widowed wealthy philanthropist P'Gell Roxton during his chase of a purse snatcher, Denny approaches Commissioner Dolan about his questions regarding Teasdale. Commissioner Dolan dismisses Denny's inquiries due to Teasdale's standing in the community, with Denny stating he intends to continue his investigation undeterred. Upon departure, he confronts a young street-smart child named Eubie who is hocking stolen tape decks to crippled children at the event, with Denny letting Eubie off with a stern warning.

Denny's investigation takes him to the Roxton Museum to confront Teasdale, who is the curator of the museum. When Denny inquires about the art crime, Sevrin's manuscript, Teasdale denies any knowledge of it and has museum security forcefully eject Denny from the museum. Outside the museum, Denny is approached by a teamster named Bruno, who claims to have knowledge of Teasdale's illegal activities and arranges a rendezvous with Denny later that night at Pier 10. Denny comes to Pier 10, and upon Bruno's arrival, Denny is shot by Bruno and left for dead, falling into the ocean.

Denny's bloodstained badge is found by the city's police later that night, with Commissioner Dolan confirming Denny's identity and lamenting his inaction during their meeting earlier that day. Later at Wildwood Cemetery, Eubie confronts his business partner Stevie over the tape decks that Eubie thought were factory seconds when they were, in fact, stolen. The two are startled by groaning sounds and a shambling figure, which causes Stevie to flee, but Eubie soon discovers it's Denny, who is still alive despite his gunshot. As a storm gathers, Eubie takes Denny inside a mausoleum and administers first aid to Denny. Eubie tells Denny he needs a hospital, but Denny rejects the notion and tells Eubie to instead bring a doctor to him that he can trust to not let anyone know he's alive.

Sometime later, Denny and Eubie observe Denny's funeral service, which is attended by the commissioner and Ellen Dolan. After the service breaks, Denny tells Eubie of his plan to use his presumed death to confront criminals when they least expect it and dons a domino mask to emphasize his point. Denny begins taking down criminals in his new guise as a masked crimefighter, with the newspapers now referring to him as The Spirit. After establishing himself, Denny visits Commissioner Dolan in the guise of The Spirit and reveals his true identity to Commissioner Dolan's shock. Denny informs Commissioner Dolan that he intends to continue his investigation into Teasdale. Commissioner Dolan tells Denny that he looked into Teasdale after Denny supposedly died and was unable to find any evidence of wrongdoing, but Denny suggests that if Teasdale hasn't been detected, he may be involved in forgeries. The meeting is interrupted by the arrival of Ellen, who is startled by Denny's appearance as The Spirit briefly knocks him unconscious, but is soon informed of the situation by the Commissioner and Denny before Denny departs with his secret intact from Ellen.

The next day, as Ellen and P'Gell socialize while a radio report of The Spirit's latest escapade is recounted, Ellen lets slip details that lead P'Gell to believe she's met The Spirit. Later that night, The Spirit breaks into a plating firm to investigate, and following a misunderstanding with Ellen in which The Spirit tells her to contact her father, The Spirit witnesses Teasdale's forgery operations, and a fight ensues between The Spirit and the henchmen led by Bruno. The Spirit is knocked unconscious after the fight and is placed on a platform that slowly descends into an acid vat as the henchmen depart. As Ellen prepares to leave, she notices all the lights in the building go dark and rushes back to investigate, rescuing The Spirit and enlisting the help of a sympathetic cabbie. The two regroup at Commissioner Dolan's residence to discuss what The Spirit witnessed,d including Denny Colt's murderer working at the firm. Ellen is disbelieving of The Spirit's accusations against Teasdale.

The following day, The Spirit disguises himself as an elderly scholar and meets with P'Gell and Teasdale, and lets slip that he has a copy of Sevrin's Manuscript. Upon The Spirit's departure, P'Gell sees Teasdale out, and it's revealed that P'Gell is actually the forger and is Bruno's Girlfriend. The Spirit returns to Wildwood Cemetery and sends Eubie to deliver a note to the commissioner at the museum party while he deals with Bruno and two of P'Gell's henchmen. The fight is interrupted with the arrival of P'Gell, who reveals herself as the mastermind, shoots The Spirit with a tranquilizer gun, and takes him to the museum basement to have him interrogated over the manuscripts' location. The interrogation renders The Spirit unconscious, and P'Gell berates Bruno for killing Sevrin when he was only supposed to steal the Manuscript. The Spirit unconsciously lets the word "Ellen" slip, prompting P'Gell to confront Ellen at the party.

P'Gell captures Ellen and places her in an iron maiden, which prompts The Spirit to reveal that the manuscript was a ruse. Self-assured, P'Gell directs her men to set up a bomb that will cover up her forgery efforts by destroying the entire museum and the duplicates within. The Spirit manages to escape his bonds, jams the iron maiden, and sets out to stop P'Gell and her men's plan. The Spirit deactivates the first two bombs and subdues P'Gell's henchmen, leading to a skirmish between The Spirit and Bruno to get to the final bomb, with The Spirit ultimately prevailing. The police arrive at P'Gell's estate, unaware that she has already fled with the help of her butler, Ricardo. At The Spirit's cemetery hideout, Ellen and The Spirit enjoy a drink, optimistically discussing how the joint efforts of Lloyd's of London and Interpol will see the stolen artifacts recovered, with The Spirit confident that he and P'Gell will cross paths again.

== Cast ==
Sam J. Jones as Denny Colt/The Spirit

- Sam J. Jones as Denny Colt/The Spirit
- Nana Visitor as Ellen Dolan
- Bumper Robinson as Eubie
- Garry Walberg as Commissioner Dolan
- Daniel Davis as Simon Teasdale
- Laura M. Robinson as P'Gell Roxton
- Philip Baker Hall as William Sevrin

== Production ==
=== Development at NBC ===
Producer Paul Aratow, a professed fan of the character, first acquired an option on Will Eisner's The Spirit in 1975 and not long thereafter began development with NBC on a TV movie adaptation of the property with William Friedkin slated to produce and direct the film that would serve as a pilot for a proposed series. For Friedkin's incarnation of the project Burt Reynolds and Flip Wilson were in negotiations to play the characters of Denny Colt/The Spirit and Ebony White respectively. Friendkin and NBC's iteration of the project ultimately never came to fruition with Friedkin attempting to develop treatments with writers such as Pete Hamill, Jules Feiffer, Harlan Ellison, and Eisner himself with Friedkin unable to find a treatment he liked and eventually leaving the project while Aratow would release The Spirit rights to Columbia Pictures in 1980. According to Einser's publisher, Denis Kitchen of Kitchen Sink Press, Eisner never had any serious desire to see The Spirit adapted and was just content to collect checks for the options. According to Ellison, Friedkin may have become soured on the project when Ellison praised his film Sorcerer which had become a massive Box-office failure that derailed Friedkin's career and cost him several jobs and during their conversation Friedkin referred to the film as "a piece of shit". When Ellison countered Friedkin's stance by calling the film the best film Friedkin ever made this led to an argument between the two that got so heated that it emptied the restaurant in which they were seated and shortly thereafter Friedkin abandoned the project.

=== Attempt at animated feature film ===
Concept art for the cancelled The Spirit animated film Jerry Rees. Top: Denny Colt/The Spirit and his side kick Ebony White flying through the air during an action sequence. Bottom: Denny Colt/The Spirit's late night rendezvous with femme fatale Sand Saref.

In the 1980s, animator Brad Bird was working at Walt Disney Animation Studios and disillusioned with the current state of animation as he and other CalArts alums working at the studio felt nothing worthwhile had been done with character animation for the past two decades. Bird had become a fan of The Spirit due to its cinematic style as well as Eisner's more cartoonish character designs in comparison to other superhero works, and with the help of what few CalArts alums he could entice, including Glen Keane and Jerry Rees, Bird and his crew established an ad hoc studio called Visions Animation + Filmworks and produced a pitch trailer over the course of five months in their off hours from Disney for the purpose of showcasing it to potential producers. The Spirit pitch trailer would later be incorporated into Bird's sample film reel he called A Portfolio of Projects which included other projects such as Family Dog. Freelance publicist Steven Paul Leiva, who specialized in animators and had represented clients such as Chuck Jones, Bill Melendez, and Richard Williams, had also grown frustrated with the current state of American animation and was looking to move from publicity to producing. While attending Filmex at the Cinerama Dome in 1980, Leiva was shown the pencil test trailer Bird and his team had produced by a colleague and was impressed not only with how efficiently it told The Spirit's origin and tone of the story, but also said it had the finest human animation he'd ever seen and joined the project as a producer.

Bird sent letters and copies of the trailer to several high-profile figures to pitch the project including Steven Spielberg, George Lucas, and Francis Ford Coppola, but ultimately it was producer Gary Kurtz who decided to back the project, as he was a comic book fan, and was impressed by the pitch Bird's team had produced, and was well acquainted with Leiva through their mutual association with Chuck Jones. Kurtz secured the option and took Bird and Leiva to pitch the project to Will Eisner in New York, and while Eisner was initially hesitant as he never considered having his character adapted to animation Leiva and Bird won him over with their pitch trailer and finalized the deal with Kurtz not longtherafter. While Kurtz had a high profile in the industry, following his split from Lucasfilm he no longer had any significant financial backing. Bird eventually began developing the screenplay along with Jerry Rees who had just finished work on Tron. Development on The Spirit took place over the course of several years with Bird moving his office to Kurtz' Kinetographics in Marin County, California to work on the project. Leiva joined as well as Kinetographics' Director of Animation Development overseeing not only The Spirit but also Nemo an adaptation of Winsor McCay's comic strip Little Nemo which was being co-produced with Tokyo Movie Shinsha. Bird and Rees created a full screenplay, full storyboard, as well as several individual pieces of concept art. Eisner himself was heavily involved with development attending story conferences with Bird and Rees (as the screenplay was inspired by some of Eisner's original The Spirit stories), provided model sheets, and even had veto power over the artwork prior to principal photography. Eisner even stated that the majority of pre-production on the film had been completed. During development, the presentation package put together by Bird and Rees for showcasing to potential financiers was stolen with Rees theorizing the thieves probably thought it was a musical instrument and most likely tossed it in the trash once they realized what was taken.

Despite the clout the project had thanks to Kurtz' role in producing blockbusters like American Graffiti and the first two Star Wars films, the project ultimately didn't come to fruition as the only animated projects at the time making money were soft toy based projects like The Care Bears Movie while rumors swirled about the possible demise of Walt Disney Animation in the wake of The Black Cauldron's failure, and investors believed that even in the most ideal circumstances no animated film would ever make more than $50 million and only Disney could ever hope to approach such a benchmark which ultimately led to the project's demise. Many executives who read the script praised it but couldn't understand why they wanted to make it an animated film as it wasn't a fairy tale and didn't have any talking animals. One executive offered to buy the screenplay and make it as a live action film, but Bird refused as the whole purpose of the project was to create something to revolutionize animation. While the film ultimately was not made, Bird would incorporate some of the stylistic techniques for this project into The Incredibles. Bird would also base much of the characterization of the titular character of Ray Gunn on The Spirit.

=== Revival at ABC ===
Aratow had become acquainted with Eisner while working on an adaptation of another Eisner creation, Sheena, and the two worked together in reviving the project in the mid-80s. In 1986, Aratow and Eisner's attorney met with Warner Bros. Television Studios to secure the rights for Aratow from producer Gary Kurtz. Aratow had the executives at Warner Bros. interested within four days after showing them The Spirit reprints. While Aratow was busy negotiating, Eisner had been approached by another producer interested in the property, but as Eisner had a handshake agreement with Aratow, he turned him down with Aratow shocked to learn after the fact the producer was Steven Spielberg.

The Spirit television film was then set up at ABC as a pilot for a potential series. Director Michael Schultz, producer Paul Aratow, and writer Steven E. de Souza had initially intended to play the material as a straight forward adaptation of the source material, but after Sam J. Jones was cast as the titular character as part of a non-negotiable mandate from ABC, the team collectively decided a serious performance wasn't working and opted to play the material like Flash Gordon or the 1960s Batman series. The creative team used Kitchen Sink Press reprints of The Spirit for visual and thematic references with de Souza incorporating Eisner's writing style into his own and Schultz staging the lighting and framing like the comics. Due to the problematic nature of the character of Ebony White, the team reworked the character in massively toned down fashion as Eubie played by Bumper Robinson. According to de Souza, the team had to fight for Eubie's inclusion in the pilot as ABC's Broadcast Standards and Practices said The Spirit's sidekick could not be black. When the team inquired as to why, they were told that a black subordinate would be perpetuating a negative stereotype. The production had wanted to set the film in the 1940s, but due to budget constraints this wasn't possible and instead it was decided to make the film a "no period" piece with the setting featuring a mixture of archaic and modern aesthetics, a stylistic choice the art department would bring to the 1989 Batman which included many who'd worked on The Spirit.

=== Filming ===
The Spirit was shot over the course of 21 days. According to Aratow, Eisner himself gave some input into the script, but during the actual shooting, Eisner was living in Florida and was still ironing out legal matters with Warner Bros. regarding the character rights as shooting was taking place. This meant that Eisner couldn't provide input during the actual production, to which Aratow expressed disappointment as he'd hoped to have Eisner provide a cameo in the film.

=== Planned storylines ===
In addition to writing the pilot, de Souza also crafted outlines for future story lines for The Spirit such as The Spirit taking on an impostor framing The Spirit for his crimes or the Spirit taking on an illegal animal experimentation ring. Additionally, Laura M. Robinson's P'Gell Roxton was meant to be a recurring antagonist.

== Release ==
While the film was shot as a pilot for a potential The Spirit TV series for ABC's 1986 Fall Schedule, during production ABC experienced a change in ownership, with the network having been bought by Capital Cities Communications in January of 1986, with many of the executives who'd shepherded the project now gone from the company and new management found the pilot "too offbeat and morbid" and shelved the pilot without even setting up any test screenings. The creative team tried to rescue the pilot by holding a screening at the 1986 San Diego Comic-Con as well as circulating a "Save the Spirit" petition whose signatories included Paul Dini, Peter David, and Len Wein. ABC eventually aired the pilot on July 31, 1987 where it was followed by an airing of National Lampoon's Class Reunion, but did so with little fanfare and well past the point where series pickup was a possibility. The film was, was however, broadcast in various European markets where it performed significantly better.

The Spirit was released on DVD on October 15, 2013, as part of the Warner Archive Collection.

== Reception ==
In a review for The New York Times, John Corry wrote "The Spirit wants very much to be good-humored. Mostly, though, it's just sappy."

In a slightly more positive review for Cinefantastique, Dan Scapperotti wrote "Liberties have been taken with the hero but this unsold pilot adds up to a mildly enjoyable TV experience".

Will Eisner expressed dissatisfaction with the result of The Spirit calling it "Awful" and "Cardboard" and saying the experience watching it "made my toes curl". Paul Aratow spoke of The Spirit with frustration having spent a decade trying to get the film made and complimented Steven E. de Souza's script, Michael Schultz' direction, and the film's production and costume design as high points while lamenting the fact ABC forced them to use Sam J. Jones as the lead and that had a different actor played The Spirit it would've resulted in a much stronger result. After the pilot failed to be picked up, Aratow said that he would like to take a second attempt at adapting The Spirit, possibly as an animated film, but that it would be dependent on Warner Bros. as they had purchased rights to The Spirit but had them in a "hold back" situation where even if they had no intention of doing anything with the property they could also choose to not let anyone else do anything until the rights expire.

== Reboot ==
In 1994, producer Michael Uslan and executive producers Benjamin Melniker and Steven Maier subsequently obtained the rights for a live-action film adaptation. The producer promised Eisner that he would not permit anyone who "didn't get it" to work on the project. Two ideas pitched to Uslan were to put the Spirit in a costume and to have the Spirit be a resurrected dead man who possessed supernatural powers. Screenwriter John Turman, a comic book fan, expressed interest in writing the script.

In July 2006, the film trade press reported Miller would write and direct the film adaptation for The Spirit; Miller and the producers publicly announced this at the 2006 Comic-Con International in San Diego, California. Miller said that he was putting together a film treatment that included large parts of The Spirit strip panels. As Miller described the project, "I intend to be extremely faithful to the heart and soul of the material, but it won't be nostalgic. It will be much scarier than people expect". Miller filmed The Spirit using the same digital background technology that was used for Sin City and 300. The film would also copy specific shots from the comic, similar to Sin City.

The film premiered on December 17, 2008, at Grauman's Chinese Theatre. The Spirit was released in theaters in the United States on Christmas Day the following week.

In January 2026, it was reported that Will Eisner's estate, run by his widow's nephew Carl Gropper and his wife Nancy, was looking to sell the entirety of Will Eisner's intellectual property including The Spirit with the sale also including a complete unpublished 72 page graphic novel Eisner had finished titled The Spirit Returns featuring The Spirit squaring off against a ruthless vigilante who has no qualms about killing. The Groppers voiced hope to find a buyer that could keep The Spirit in the public eye and voiced hope for either a live-action feature film or animated film noting that the 2008 attempt didn't make a lot of sense.
