= Sam J. Jones =

American actor

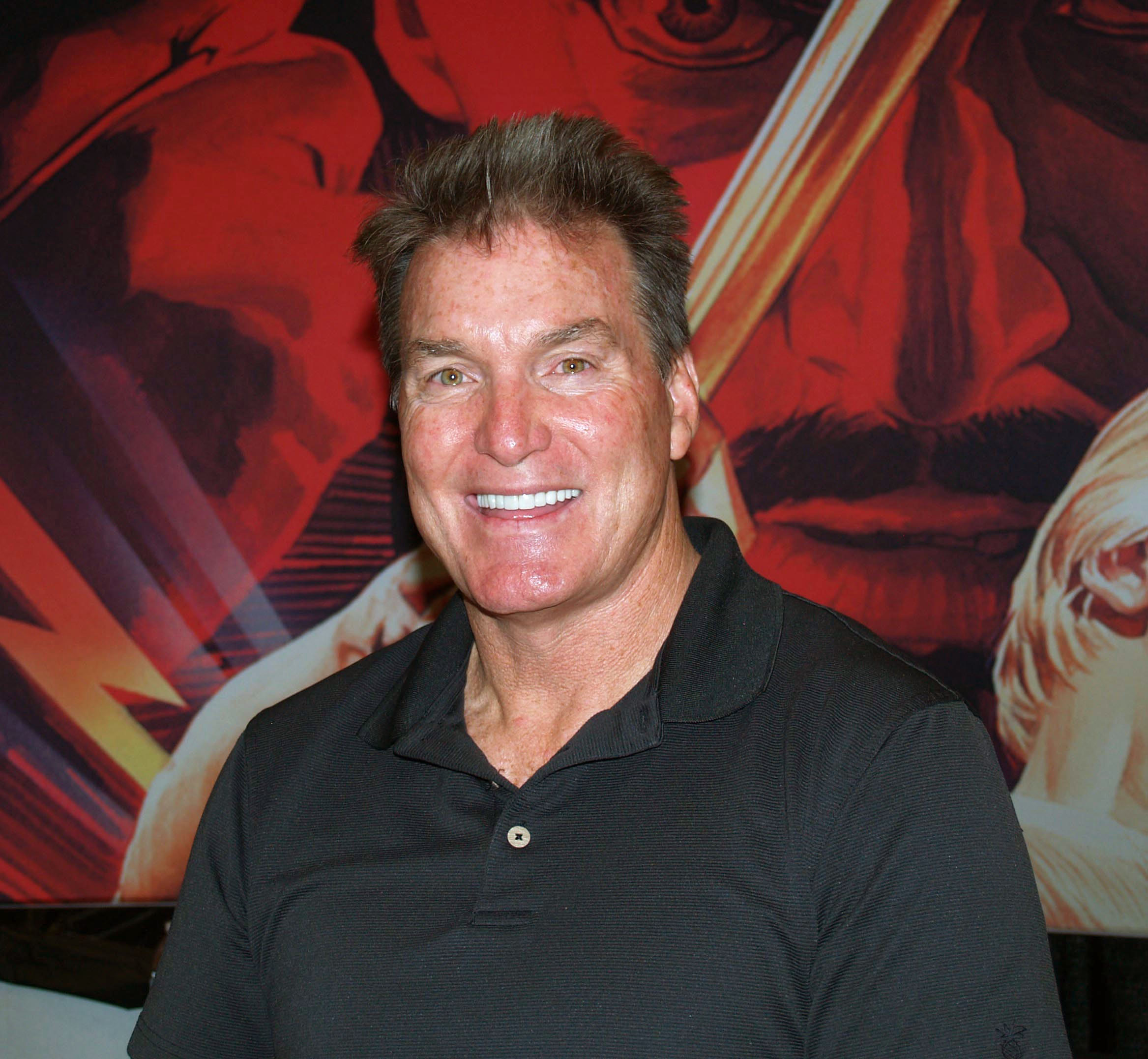
- Jones in April 2016
- Born: Samuel Gerald Jones; Chicago, Illinois, U.S.
- Occupations: Actor; football player
- Years active: 1975–present
- Spouses: Lynn Eriks (m. 1982; div. 1987) Myrtille Blervaque (m. 1987; div. 1990) Ramona Lynn (m. 1992)
- Children: 5
- Military service
- Allegiance: United States
- Branch: United States Marine Corps
- Years: 1972–1974
- Rank: Private First Class (PFC)

Samuel Gerald Jones, known professionally as Sam J. Jones, is an American actor and former football player. He is known for playing the title character in the 1980 film Flash Gordon and for starring in the short-lived TV series The Highwayman (1987–1988).

== Early life ==
Samuel Gerald Jones was born in Chicago, Illinois, and grew up in Sacramento, California. In 1972, after high school, Jones enlisted in the United States Marine Corps where he played American football. With service in the Corps completed, he moved to Seattle with the ambition of joining the Seahawks but was turned down. Instead, in 1976, he played for their practice team, the Flyers, as a semi-professional.

To supplement his income, Jones also began modeling. Starting in 1975, he appeared full-frontal nude under the alias Andrew Cooper III as the centerfold for a photo-spread in the June issue of Playgirl magazine. He also starred in television commercials for a sporting goods store in Seattle before finally moving to Los Angeles in 1977.

== Career ==
Jones made his first film appearance in the 1979 romantic comedy film 10. His appearance in 10 allowed him to beat Kurt Russell and Arnold Schwarzenegger for his most famous role, that of Flash Gordon in the 1980 film of the same name. Jones' hair was dyed blonde for this role. The film was moderately successful at the box office grossing $27.1 million in North America, and $22 million in the UK, double its $20 million budget. However, a falling-out between Jones and producer Dino De Laurentiis led to the scrapping of a planned film trilogy.

After the release of Flash Gordon, Playgirl reprinted his 1975 nude photo spread in its January 1981 issue, this time using his real name. He went on to play Chris Rorchek in the TV series Code Red (1981–1982). He had guest roles in other TV shows including The A-Team, Hunter, and Riptide. In 1987, he played the lead role in a TV movie adaptation of Will Eisner's comics character The Spirit. He also played the title character in the short-lived NBC sci-fi series The Highwayman. In the late 1980s and early 1990s he portrayed Johnny Valentine on the HBO series 1st & Ten.

Jones starred in the 1986 theatrical release My Chauffeur and the straight-to-video movies Jungle Heat (1985), Jane and the Lost City (1987), Under the Gun (1988), Silent Assassins (1988), Whiteforce (1988), Driving Force (1989) and One Man Force (1989). In the 1990s, Jones had roles in films including In Gold We Trust (1990), Maximum Force (1992), Fist of Honor (1993), Hard Vice (1994), Enter the Shootfighter (1995), Texas Payback (1995), The Killer Inside (1996), Earth Minus Zero (1996), Baja Run (1996) and American Tigers (1996), and guest roles in the TV shows Baywatch, Diagnosis Murder and Walker: Texas Ranger.

In 2001, Jones was cast in Animal Planet's family series Hollywood Safari as park ranger Troy Johnson. He appeared in "Deadman Switch", an episode of the television series Stargate SG-1. In 2002, Jones retrained and when he is not acting or working autograph booths on the ComicCon circuit, he is a high-end security professional in San Diego, protecting executives traveling to Mexico. In his words "I became a security professional 15 years ago. My wife looked at me and said, 'You've been waiting for the phone to ring. The phone isn't ringing. We have kids. There's the door. Don’t come back until you're providing.' That's why I walked away from labels years ago. Actor? I'm a working man. Whatever it takes to provide, I'm a working man".

In 2007, Jones played the prisoner Krebb in the Sci Fi Channel original television series Flash Gordon. He also had extended cameos (as himself, with his blond Flash Gordon hairstyle) in both the 2012 comedy film Ted and its 2015 sequel Ted 2. Jones then starred in, and served as an executive producer of, Life After Flash, a crowdfunded feature-length documentary about Flash Gordon. The documentary, which chronicles the original film's production and cult following through interviews with fans and members of its cast and crew, including Melody Anderson, Brian Blessed, Peter Wyngarde, Mark Millar, Robert Rodriguez, Stan Lee and Brian May, also explores how Jones' falling-out with De Laurentiis impacted his life and career.

== Personal life ==
Jones married Lynn Eriks in 1982; they had two children and divorced in 1987. Following the divorce from Eriks, he married Myrtille Blervaque, a French actress he met when he was filming Jane and the Lost City in Mauritius. They were married in Nevada on August 15, 1987, and divorced three years later. He married Ramona Lynn Jones on June 26, 1992; they have three children.

== Filmography ==
=== Film ===
Year	Title	Role	Notes
1979	10	David Hanley	
1980	Flash Gordon	Flash Gordon	
1985	Jungle Heat	Gordon	
1986	My Chauffeur	"Battle" Witherspoon	
1987	Jane and the Lost City	Jack "Jungle Jack" Buck	
1988	Under the Gun	Mike Braxton	
1988	Silent Assassins	Sam Kettle	
1988	Whiteforce	Johnny Quinn	
1989	Driving Force	Steve O'Neill	
1989	One Man Force	Pete	
1989	Trigon Fire	James Ford	
1990	In Gold We Trust	Jeff Slater	
1992	Maximum Force	Michael Crews	
1992	The Other Woman	Mike Florian	Direct-to-video
1992	Night Rhythms	Jackson	Direct-to-video
1993	DaVinci's War	Jim Holbrook	
1993	Fist of Honor	"Fist"	
1993	Lady Dragon 2	Reb	
1993	South Beach	Billy	
1993	Thunder in Paradise	David Kilmer	Direct-to-video
1993	Expert Weapon	Janson	
1994	Hard Vice	Joe	
1995	Ballistic	Braden	
1995	Karate Tiger 8: Fists of Iron	Tyler Green	
1995	Texas Payback	Louis Gentry	
1996	Where Truth Lies	James	
1996	American Strays	The Exterminator	
1996	The Killer Inside	Steve Davis	
1996	R.I.O.T.: The Movie	Jimmy O'Brien	Direct-to-video
1996	Earth Minus Zero	Marshal Heller	
1996	Baja Run	Carl Brubaker	
1996	American Tigers	Sergeant Major Ransom	
1997	T.N.T.	Greel	
1998	Evasive Action	Convict	
2000	Down 'n Dirty	Stanton James	
2001	Dead Sexy	Rackles	Direct-to-video
2001	Gangland	Sergeant Richards	
2001	Van Hook	Uncle Dwayne	
2002	Cold Sweat	"Mondo"	Direct-to-video
2002	Psychotic	Donald Westlake	
2002	Redemption	"The Brick"	Direct-to-video
2007	Revamped	Jake Hardcastle	Direct-to-video
2012	Ted	Himself	
2015	Ted 2	Himself	
2017	Head Games	Spokesman	Short film
2018	Fury of the Fist and the Golden Fleece	Flash / Man With The Golden Fleece	
2019	One of the Good Ones	Billy	
2019	Axcellerator	Brink	
2019	The Silent Natural	Jacob Hoy	
2021	Edgar Allan Poe's Decapitarium	Dean Usher	
2022	An Unlikely Angel	Buck	

=== Television ===
Year	Title	Role	Notes
1980	Stunts Unlimited	Bo Carlson	TV movie
1981–1982	Code Red	Chris Rorchek	17 episodes
1984	The A-Team	Eric	Episode: "Semi-Friendly Persuasion"
1984	No Man's Land	Eli Howe	TV movie
1984	Hunter	Lance Lane	Episode: "The Hot Grounder"
1984	Riptide	Rick Beeber	Episode: "Be True to Your School"
1985	Hardcastle and McCormick	Grant Miller	Episode: "Too Rich and Too Thin"
1985	This Wife for Hire	Tommy Sellers	TV movie
1986	1st & Ten	Johnny Valentine	6 episodes
1987	The Spirit	Spirit / Denny Colt	TV movie
1987–1988	The Highwayman	The Highwayman	10 episodes
1989	L.A. Takedown	Jimmy	TV movie
1991	Shades of L.A.	B.J. Makowski	2 episodes
1991	P.S. I Luv U	Luke	Episode: "I'd Kill to Direct"
1992	The Hat Squad	Victory Smith	Episode: "Pilot"
1993	Key West	Commander Beauregard Richards	Episode: "The Greening"
1993	Cobra	Sergeant Clay Miller / Royce	2 episodes
1993	Baywatch	Ken Jordan	2 episodes
1993–1995	Renegade	Haggerty / Nicky Griffin / Earl Lyons	3 episodes
1993–1997	Walker, Texas Ranger	Mick Stanley / Tommy Williams / Samuel J. Bodine	2 episodes
1994	Thunder in Paradise	David Kilmer	2 episodes
1995	Diagnosis: Murder	Lieutenant "Buck" Denton	Episode: "Sea No Evil"
1995	Ray Alexander: A Menu for Murder	Bobby Deval	TV movie
1996	Pacific Blue	Rolf	Episode: "Burnout"
1997	Conan the Adventurer	General Knorr	Episode: "The Ruby Fruit Forest"
1998–2001	Hollywood Safari	Troy Johnson	23 episodes
1999	L.A. Heat	Randy Harden / Sullivan	2 episodes
1999	Silk Stalkings	Sidney	2 episodes
1999	Stargate SG-1	Aris Boch	Episode: "Deadman Switch"
2001	Black Scorpion	"Space Case"	Episode: "Photo Finish"
2007	Flash Gordon	Krebb	Episode: "Revelations"

=== Video games ===
Year	Title	Role	Notes
1993	Return to Zork	Blind Bowman	
