= Midnight Cop =

1988 film

Midnight Cop (German: Killing Blue) is a 1988 drama film directed by Peter Patzak, made in Germany.

== Plot ==
The film, which has many humorous moments, is set in Berlin, and concerns a burnt-out (and somewhat corrupt) police detective (Note: IMDb and other sites give him the title "Police Commissioner". The German kommissar is better rendered as "Inspector", as in Inspector Rex (Kommissar Rex).) Alex Glass (Armin Mueller-Stahl), and his glamorous new assistant, Shirley May (Julia Kent), who are on the trail of a drug ring, the leader of which, Miskowski (Frank Stallone), is suspected of several murders. First is a 16-year old ballet dancer Ines Berger (Constanze Rahn) who has been killed with a heroin overdose. The second is Monica (Allegra Curtis), stepdaughter of his old friend, police prosecutor Michael Carstens (Michael York). Each victim has been smeared with Vaseline, leading Glass to assume a common culprit. He drops his attitude of detached disinterest.

During a clandestine meeting, Carstens stabs Miskowski, who has been blackmailing him. Glass, unaware of his friend's involvement, spreads the misinformation that Miskowski is recovering in hospital. Carstens falls for the ploy, but has a plausible explanation for being at the hospital. Glass and Miskowski's assistant, prostitute Lisa Osterman (Morgan Fairchild), develop a loving relationship, and he gets her to tell Carstens she has the original negatives of Miskowski's blackmail photographs. A rendezvous is arranged and this time Carstens is trapped by Glass's men.

== Home media ==
The 3:2 film, with its German dialogue dubbed into English, was distributed in Australia by Showtime DVD as a two-for-one PAL disc entitled "Action", along with Slipstream starring Bill Paxton and Mark Hamill.

== See also ==
de:Killing Blue in German Wikipedia
