= Kitty Aldridge =

British actress and writer (born 1962)

- Born: 9 May 1962 (age 64); Bahrain
- Occupations: Novelist, actress
- Spouse: Mark Knopfler (m. 1997)
- Children: 2

Kitty Aldridge (born 9 May 1962) is a British actress and writer.

== Life and career ==
Aldridge was born in Bahrain. After training as an actress at the Drama Centre London, Aldridge went on to work in film, theatre and television as an actress for 15 years. In her thirties she began to write fiction. Her first novel, Pop, published in 2001, was longlisted for the Orange Prize for Fiction 2002 and shortlisted for the Pendleton May First Novel Award 2002. Her second novel, Cryers Hill, was published in March 2007.

Aldridge's short story, Arrivederci Les, won the Bridport Short Story Prize 2011.

Her third novel, A Trick I Learned from Dead Men, was published in 2012. It was longlisted for the 2013 Baileys Women's Prize for Fiction and The Guardian newspaper's Not The Booker Prize 2012.

Aldridge’s most recent novel, The Wisdom of Bones, was published in May 2019.

Aldridge married Mark Knopfler, the former guitarist and frontman of Dire Straits, on Valentine's Day 1997 in Barbados. They have two daughters.

== Filmography ==
=== Film ===
Year	Title	Role	Notes
1985	A Room with a View	New Lucy	
1986	Gathering Stones	Anna	Short
1987	Maurice	Kitty Hall	
1987	An African Dream	Katherine Hastings	
1988	American Roulette	Kate Webber	
1988	Tyger Tyger Burning Bright	Tasmin	
1989	Slipstream	Belitski	
1998	Divorcing Jack	Agnes Brinn	

=== Television ===
Year	Title	Role	Notes
1987	Porterhouse Blue	Serena	"1.4"
1988	The Management	Kitty	"The Wedding"
1989	The Paradise Club	DI Rosy Campbell	Main role (series 1)
1990	A Little Piece of Sunshine	Sabrina	TV film
1990	The World of Eddie Weary	Barbara Daniels	TV film
1992	Downtown Lagos	Alice Hughes	TV miniseries
1993	Heartbeat	Sarah Collins	"Baby Blues"
1993	To Play the King	Sarah Harding	TV miniseries
1996	Cadfael	Judith Perle	"The Rose Rent"
1997	The Ice House	Anne Cattrell	TV miniseries

== Bibliography ==
- Pop, Cape (Vintage); (2001) ISBN 0099428326
- Cryers Hill, Cape (Vintage); (1 March 2007) ISBN 0099506181
- Arrivederci Les; (2011)
- A Trick I Learned from Dead Men, Cape (Vintage); (5 July 2012) ISBN 0224096435
- The Wisdom of Bones, Corsair (Little, Brown); (May 2, 2019) ISBN 9781472154392

== Awards ==
- Bridport Short Story Prize 2011
