= Whiteforce =

- Directed by: Eddie Romero
- Written by: Henry Tefay
- Produced by: Antony I. Ginnane; Lope V. Juban Jr.; Marilyn Ong
- Starring: Sam Jones; Kimberley Pastone
- Cinematography: Joe Batac
- Edited by: Gervacio Santos
- Music by: Ryan Cayabyab
- Production companies: Eastern Film Management Corporation; FGH; International Film Management Limited
- Release date: November 22, 1988
- Running time: 86 mins
- Countries: Australia; Philippines
- Language: English

Whiteforce is a 1988 film directed by Eddie Romero starring Sam Jones and Kimberley Pastone. The screenplay concerns an undercover agent accused of murdering his partner.

== Cast ==
- Sam Jones
- Kimberley Pastone
