= Slipstream (1989 film) =

- UK Theatrical release cinema poster
- Directed by: Steven Lisberger
- Screenplay by: Tony Kayden
- Story by: Bill Bauer
- Produced by: Gary Kurtz
- Starring: Mark Hamill; Bob Peck; Bill Paxton; Kitty Aldridge; Ben Kingsley; F. Murray Abraham
- Cinematography: Frank Tidy
- Edited by: Terry Rawlings
- Music by: Elmer Bernstein
- Production company: Entertainment Film
- Distributed by: Entertainment Film Distributors
- Release dates: February 10, 1989 (Premiere); February 11, 1989 (London)
- Running time: 102 minutes
- Country: United Kingdom
- Language: English
- Budget: $15 million
- Box office: £0.6 million (UK/Australia)

Slipstream is a 1989 science fiction film directed by Steven Lisberger, who had previously directed the cult classic 1982 science fiction film Tron. It was produced by Gary Kurtz, best known for his collaboration with George Lucas on the first two Star Wars films and American Graffiti. Slipstream reunited Kurtz with his Star Wars lead Mark Hamill, who stars alongside Bill Paxton, Bob Peck and Kitty Aldridge, with cameo appearances from Robbie Coltrane, Ben Kingsley, Roshan Seth and F. Murray Abraham.

== Plot ==
A voiceover sets the scene: the time is after the Harmonic Convergence, when drastic climate change has swept away civilization as we know it. A vast wind current, the Slipstream, encircles the globe, and a few scattered settlements of survivors attempt to keep human life going.

An aeroplane pursues a man running down a canyon, cornering him at a precipice. The plane lands, and its occupants, bounty hunters Will Tasker and Belitski, chase the man and shoot him with a grappling hook. The fugitive looks at his arm, but seems intrigued rather than distressed. Tasker pulls on the rope, and the man tumbles down the side of the canyon, but he is not harmed. Immediately after his fall, the fugitive quotes from the aviator and poet John Gillespie Magee, Jr.: "I have slipped the surly bonds of Earth, put out my hand and touched the Face of God."

The bounty hunters take their prisoner to a busy airstrip, where he stands beside them, handcuffed, as they eat in the diner. Matt Owens, a small-time arms dealer, nearly gets his arm broken when he makes a pass at Belitski, then tries to sell contraband to Tasker. It is then revealed that Tasker and Belitski are part of the remnants of a law enforcement agency, trying to keep the peace in a post-apocalyptic society. Tasker seizes some of Owens' goods. However, as the pair are leaving, Owens abducts their prisoner so that he can claim the large reward. Tasker shoots Owens with a dart, telling him that it is poisoned, but it also implants a tracking device in Owens' body, enabling Belitski and Tasker to follow them.

Owens first flies to his home, Hell's Kitchen. On the way, the prisoner quotes from the poetry of Byron, and misunderstanding, Owens begins to call him Byron. After their arrival at Hell's Kitchen, Byron heals a boy blinded by cataracts, and Owens begins to wonder if Byron is more than he appears. After getting lost, they land at the home of a cult of cave-dwellers who worship the Slipstream and have recently been attacked by bandits. Byron attempts to help, lifting a heavy milling stone off Avatar, the cult's leader. In his dying words, Avatar curses Byron as being part of the out-of-control technological advancements that led to the apocalyptic Convergence. The cultists let the wind decide what to do with Byron and tie him to a massive kite in the wind.

The bounty hunters arrive midway through a windstorm, and Owens bargains with them to work together to get Byron down. Tasker reveals to Owens that Byron is an android. After a rough landing from the destroyed kite, Belitski allows Byron and Owens to escape. Another visitor to the valley, Ariel, helps them escape and convinces them to take her to her former home. Ariel introduces them to her people, who inhabit a fortified underground museum. Byron's knowledge and appreciation of the museum's ancient contents make Ariel emotionally attached to him. Byron and Ariel spend the night together, while Owens gets drunk and hooks up with a girl in the community. The girl helps Owens decide to free Byron, who has become his friend. Later, Byron reveals that he was hunted for murder, and the man he killed was his master, he was designed as the man's companion, and when the man asked him to end his life, he obeyed, even though he was programmed not to harm. Byron also excitedly tells Owens that he has slept with someone for the first time and dreamt of a land at the end of the Slipstream, inhabited by other androids. After this, Owens tells Byron he will not take him in, although the two quibble about what Byron can do with Ariel and his instincts.

Having tracked the trio to the museum, Tasker and Belitski force entry, killing guards and some inhabitants. After beating the Curator, Tasker forces the rest to find the fugitives. Byron is captured while Belitski shoots Owens in the chest with a dart. Owens retaliates by knocking her out and handcuffing her to a bed. She wakes and explains that the dart is the antidote to the poison. Owens engages in a shootout with Tasker in which Ariel is killed. Enraged at her death, Byron pursues Tasker to his plane. Tasker shoots Byron, to no effect, then tries to run him down with the plane as he takes off. However, Byron manages to climb and smash his way into the cockpit. As Byron is on the verge of killing him, Tasker quotes the Magee poem, and he relents. He then attempts to regain control of the damaged aircraft by using the control wires, but it crashes. Tasker is killed, but Byron survives because he is indestructible. He returns to the museum to find that Belitski has consented to become Owens' partner, they fly off together while Byron leaves to seek his promised land.

== Cast ==
- Mark Hamill as Will Tasker
- Kitty Aldridge as Belitski
- Bill Paxton as Matt Owens
- Bob Peck as Byron
- Eleanor David as Ariel
- Robbie Coltrane as Montclaire
- Ben Kingsley as Avatar
- F. Murray Abraham as Cornelius
- Roshan Seth as George Nyman

== Production ==
The original script for Slipstream was written by Charles Edward Pogue shortly after the success of Mad Max and was heavily inspired by that film's stylistic and thematic approaches. Producer Gary Kurtz came across the script through a friend and while he was intrigued by the core premise, Kurtz was more uncertain about the violent and exploitative elements. Structurally, the film was inspired by Adventures of Huckleberry Finn by Mark Twain with the original premise involving a 14 year old boy traversing the wasteland with a runaway android. Slipstream marked Kurtz' first production in four years after his investments in The Dark Crystal and Return to Oz under-performed and forced him to declare bankruptcy in 1985. It was the first film for Entertainment Film Productions.

In 1987, Kurtz hired Steven Lisberger to direct and rework the script with Lisberger accepting the role as he wanted to work on something more character based in contrast to effects heavy productions like Tron. Kurtz offered the role of Will Tasker to Mark Hamill as Kurtz had always wanted to see him in an antagonistic role, which Hamill accepted as he liked the idea of playing against type with this being Hamill's first part in a film since Return of the Jedi. Tony Kayden was brought in to do re-writes and wound up receiving credit for the screenplay, with Pogue apparently refusing credit, while Bill Bauer was given credit for "Based on Story Material".

The distinctive and futuristic aircraft piloted by Tasker is the Edgley Optica (also known as the Brooklands Optica Scout), a low volume British light aircraft designed as an alternative to helicopters for law enforcement and low-speed observation work.

Slipstream began ten weeks of principal photography in March 1988, at Pinewood Studios as well as locations in Yorkshire and Turkey.

== Release ==
Slipstream had its world premiere on 10 February 1989 at the Odeon Leicester Square in London in the presence of the Duke and Duchess of York on behalf of the Winchester Cathedral Trust. It opened to the general public at the cinema on 11 February 1989 and grossed £22,189 in its first two days. By the time of its general release around the country on 17 March 1989 it had grossed £99,370. Its general release was on 185 screens and it grossed £349,470 for the week but reduced to 84 screens with limited performances the following weekend. It had a short cinema run in the UK, where it was considered a flop, and Australia, where the film grossed just $66,836 during its entire theatrical run.

The film was released direct-to-video in North America by M.C.E.G. Virgin Home Entertainment in 1990. Several budget DVD copies of Slipstream have been released. Fans awaiting a director's cut have been disappointed after producer Gary Kurtz said in an interview that the script was originally much more violent, but that these violent scenes, which would have made the plot more coherent, were never filmed.

It has also been released as a DVD double feature by Payless, the other feature being 1967's In the Year 2889; it was also distributed in Australia by Showtime DVD as a double feature entitled "Action", along with Midnight Cop.

== Reception ==
As of August 2024 the film has an aggregate score on Rotten Tomatoes of 43% based on seven reviews.
