= Fist of Honor =

1993 film

- Promotional poster
- Directed by: Richard Pepin
- Screenplay by: Charles T. Kanganis
- Produced by: Joseph Merhi; Richard Pepin
- Starring: Sam J. Jones
- Cinematography: Ken Blakey
- Music by: Louis Febre
- Release date: 1993
- Language: English

Fist of Honor is a 1993 direct-to-video American action film co-produced and directed by Richard Pepin and starring Sam J. Jones.

== Plot ==
The Malucci and Diamond families are rival organised crime families in Los Angeles. Their leaders, Victor Malucci and Dino Diamond, have established a truce and divided control of the city's criminal activities between them.

The truce is threatened when Tommy Bones, a member of the Diamond organisation, discovers Johnny Malucci with his wife and kills him. To prevent the incident from starting another war between the families, Dino has Tommy killed and presents his death to Victor as an act of atonement. Victor accepts the gesture and the truce remains in place.

Dino later arranges a contest between the two families' fighters. His representative is Fist Sullivan, a former Golden Gloves boxer who works for him as a debt collector and underground fighter. Fist wins the contest and continues working for Dino, collecting debts from people who owe the organisation. Outside of his criminal activities, Fist is engaged to Gina, a singer who performs at Dino's club. The two are saving money to buy a home together, and Gina hopes Fist will eventually leave the criminal life behind.

Fist also befriends Alex, a young girl who lives in his apartment complex. Alex regards Fist as a mentor and spends much of her time away from her abusive stepfather.

Meanwhile, two members of the Malucci organisation, Frankie Pop and Eddie the Zipper, approach Dino with a plan to eliminate Victor and seize control of the city's criminal operations. Dino agrees to the conspiracy. Victor is subsequently murdered, but Dino has Frankie and Eddie killed as well, intending to eliminate everyone involved in the scheme.

Dino decides to frame Fist for the murders. He sends his associate Tucchi to Fist's apartment to plant the gun used to kill Victor. Gina unexpectedly returns home and catches Tucchi in the act. Tucchi attacks her and beats her to death with brass knuckles.

Unknown to Tucchi, Alex witnesses Gina's murder from the fire escape of the apartment complex. She is therefore able to identify Tucchi as the man responsible.

Fist returns home to find the police waiting for him. Detective Johnson arrests him and Fist is accused of murdering Victor, Frankie, Eddie and Gina. Dino intends to use the murders to remove Fist from the picture while also taking Gina for himself.

Tucchi later tells Dino what happened to Gina. Dino angrily strikes him, breaking his jaw. Meanwhile, Victor's son Sammy Malucci refuses to believe that Fist murdered his father. Sammy arranges for Fist to be released on bail.

After his release, Fist learns the truth about Gina's murder and sets out to avenge her death. With Alex able to identify Tucchi, Fist is able to track down those responsible. He confronts Tucchi and ultimately takes revenge on him for killing Gina.

Fist then turns his attention to Dino, the man who orchestrated the conspiracy and framed him for the murders. The conflict culminates in a final confrontation in which Fist defeats Dino and leaves him tied to a chair. Fist then sets Dino on fire, killing him and bringing the mob war to an end.

With Dino and Tucchi dead and the men responsible for Gina's murder eliminated, Fist finally settles the score and is free to leave the criminal world behind.

== Cast ==
- Sam J. Jones as Fist
- Joey House as Gina
- Abe Vigoda as Victor Malucci
- Harry Guardino as Dino Diamond
- Nicholas Worth as Tucchi
- Frank Sivero as Frankie Pop
- Bubba Smith as Detective Johnson
- Ali Humiston as Alex
- Nick Dimitri as Nick Glowacki
