= Policewoman Centerfold =

1983 television film directed by Reza Badiyi

- Promotional advertising for the movie
- Genre: Drama
- Written by: Jan Worthington
- Directed by: Reza Badiyi
- Starring: Melody Anderson; Ed Marinaro
- Music by: Fred Karlin
- Country of origin: United States
- Original language: English

Production
- Executive producer: Frank von Zerneck
- Producer: Robert M. Sertner
- Production location: Albuquerque, New Mexico
- Cinematography: Woody Omens
- Editor: Robert Florio
- Running time: 100 minutes
- Production company: Moonlight Productions

Original release
- Network: NBC
- Release: October 17, 1983

Policewoman Centerfold is a 1983 television movie starring Melody Anderson and Ed Marinaro, loosely based on the story of police officer Barbara Schantz who posed for Playboy magazine in 1982.

== Cast ==
- Melody Anderson as Jennifer Oaks
- Ed Marinaro as Nick Velano
- Donna Pescow as Sissy Owens
- Greg Monaghan as Chris Sands
- Bert Remsen as Captain David Buckman
- David Spielberg as Steve Jones
- Michael LeClair as Skip Oaks
- Andrea Howard as Margo Syms
- David Haskell as Todd Walker
- Jerry Supiran as Tommy Oaks

== Reception ==
It first aired on Monday, October 17, 1983, and was the seventh most-watched prime time program in the United States for the week, out-drawing Monday Night Football. It was rebroadcast in early July 1985, during the American summer TV season, when it was the most-viewed program of the week.

Upon its release, one review noted that the lead role "is not one offering much opportunity for an acting tour de force, but Anderson does manage to make the woman an understandable, sympathetic figure." It was also noted that the subject matter of the movie was a plain attempt at "exploitation and titillation" to get ratings (which plainly worked), although the title and hype did not reflect that that movie actually "downplays the sensational aspects of the matter to concentrate on the motivation of the woman and the aftermath of the photos publication."

== Release ==
The film was released on VHS in 1986.
