= Firewalker (film) =

1986 film by J. Lee Thompson

- Theatrical release poster
- Directed by: J. Lee Thompson
- Written by: Robert Gosnell
- Based on: story by Robert Gosnell and Jeffrey M. Rosenbaum and Norman Aladjem
- Produced by: Menahem Golan; Yoram Globus
- Starring: Chuck Norris; Lou Gossett; Melody Anderson; Will Sampson; Sonny Landham; John Rhys-Davies
- Cinematography: Álex Phillips Jr.
- Edited by: Richard Marks; Carlos Puente; Charles Simmons
- Music by: Gary Chang
- Distributed by: The Cannon Group
- Release date: November 21, 1986 (U.S.)
- Running time: 104 minutes
- Country: United States
- Language: English
- Box office: $11,834,302

Firewalker is a 1986 American action-adventure comedy film starring Chuck Norris, Louis Gossett Jr., Will Sampson in his final feature film role, and Melody Anderson. It was directed by J. Lee Thompson and written by Norman Aladjem, Robert Gosnell and Jeffrey M. Rosenbaum.

Max Donigan (Norris) and Leo Porter (Gossett), down-on-their-luck treasure hunters, team up with Patricia Goodwin (Anderson), a psychic with a map to an Aztec treasure. Their journey takes them through a perilous trek through Central America.

The film came about when Norris set out to create a comedy but pivoted to Firewalker, which blend action-adventure and humor, after connecting with writer Robert Gosnell. Despite initial skepticism from producers, Norris leveraged his box office draw and took the risk. Co-star Louis Gossett Jr. praised his dedication to expanding his range. Filming took place in Mexico in June 1986.

Firewalker received mixed to negative reviews, some critics compared it unfavorably to his contemporary adventure films, while other felt it was an acceptable film with a lighthearted tone. The film was one of Cannon's top box-office performers in 1986, but it fell short compared to other Norris films, earning just over $10 million domestically.

== Plot ==
Max Donigan and Leo Porter are two seasoned treasure hunters whose adventures rarely result in any notable success. After their latest stint gone wrong, they are recruited by a seemingly psychic woman, Patricia Goodwin, who has a treasure map. She convinces them that the map leads to a huge stockpile of gold belonging to the "Firewalker." She then says that someone, or thing, else is searching for the map: a red cyclops.

The map leads them to a cave on a local Native American Reservation. Patricia warns them that the cave filled with skeletons. They find a Spanish Conquistador helmet and mural depicting Aztec and Mayan art, with an anachronistic date of 1527. As Leo studies the mural, Max finds a ruby-pommeled dagger hidden inside a skull. They are ambushed inside the cave by a small group of men and Patricia is taken. After killing their attackers, Max and Leo confront the kidnapper; upon seeing the dagger, he screams and throws himself into a pit.

While discussing the nature of the dagger at a local bar, Max, Leo and Patricia hear from the barkeep about El Coyote: a local that believes himself descended from the Aztecs —who also happens to be a one-eyed man with an eye patch. The barkeep also directs them to Tall Eagle, a local Native American. He tells them that the Firewalker was a powerful being that flew away to walk in the fires of the sun and gives Patricia a small bag of "magic" to protect her. While trying to figure out where to go next, Patricia stabs the dagger into a map, then faints, giving them a location of San Miguel. Max is later drugged by a woman; El Coyote chants while holding a snake as the woman attempts to murder Max. A chanting Tall Eagle causes Patricia to suddenly wake and rush to Max's defense; she and Leo stop the woman from succeeding. They capture her, but she disappears overnight and a snake appears in her cell.

They travel to San Miguel and barter for information. A man named Boggs directs them to a contact in a village named Chajal; Boggs is later seen to have been working for, and is killed by, El Coyote. Dressed as priests and a nun to avoid detection, the trio make it to Chajal and find it completely deserted. Local militia chase them into the jungle on foot; they escape and make camp for the night. They are found in the morning by a friend of Max's: Corky Taylor, leader of a small group of Central American freedom fighters, who provides them with a vehicle to finish their journey. When they stop that night, Leo disappears; Patricia and Max believe him dead when they find blood and his glasses by the alligator-infested river.

The next morning, Patricia and Max find the temple they have been searching for. Inside, they find Leo alive and dangling from a rope, along with El Coyote. He offers Leo in exchange for the dagger, claiming he has no use for the three of them. After suggesting that Patricia can go free, she leaves and is sealed in a passageway. El Coyote laughs and explains that he will kill them and sacrifice Patricia to appease the gods and become the Firewalker. Max throws the dagger at El Coyote to kill him, but he catches it and leaves the chamber. Max rescues Leo as El Coyote prepares to kill Patricia. They reach her just in time; Max shoots El Coyote in the chest, seemingly killing him. Patricia finds the gold by placing the dagger in a slot on the altar, opening a chamber below it. After gathering the gold, El Coyote attacks them. Patricia stabs him in the back with the dagger just as he prepares to kill Max. With El Coyote stunned, Max is able to fight back, kicking him onto the altar. Patricia then sprinkles the magic bag on El Coyote's body; he bursts into flame as they leave the temple with the gold and the trio reap the rewards of their successful journey.

== Cast ==
- Chuck Norris as Max Donigan
- Louis Gossett Jr. as Leo Porter
- Melody Anderson as Patricia Goodwin
- Will Sampson as Tall Eagle
- Sonny Landham as "El Coyote"
- John Rhys-Davies as "Corky" Taylor
- Ian Abercrombie as Boggs
- Richard Lee-Sung as The General
- Zaide Silvia Gutiérrez as Indian Girl
- Álvaro Carcaño as Willie
- John Hazelwood as Tubbs
- Dale Payne as Pilot
- José Escandón as Co-Pilot
- Mário Arévalo as Guerilla Leader
- Miguel Ángel Fuentes as Big Man (Credited as Miguel Fuentes)

== Production ==
Chuck Norris was writing a comedy film to star in and was recommended writer Robert Gosnell to help. Gosnell had already written Firewalker and showed it to Norris, who decided to make it instead of the original project.

The film was Norris' first comedy, even though it was still an action film. It was described as "two guys, a girl and a Jeep on the road to a fortune in lost Aztec treasure."

"It's a detour," said Norris. "Max Donegan is really the lighter side of Chuck Norris." He added, "It's just an open, friendly, warm film with a lot of humor. It has the adventure of a Romancing the Stone and Raiders of the Lost Ark, the humor of the movie Crocodile Dundee -- where the situations cause the humor -- and the companionship between the two guys like Butch Cassidy and the Sundance Kid."

Norris says that Cannon's chairman, Menahem Golan, showed "a little skepticism" when Norris first took the film to him to develop. "It's not the type of film I'm known for doing," said Norris. But Norris had a seven-year deal with Cannon and was their leading box office star along with Charles Bronson. "Whether I do more lighter-type films beyond this one will be determined by how Firewalker does," said Norris. "The audience tells you what you'll be doing or not doing. Like Stallone - - he'll never do Rhinestone again."

Norris knew he was taking a risk. He said, "When I got crucified in my first film, Good Guys Wear Black, I went to Steve McQueen. He said the bottom line is if you get the best reviews in the world and the movie bombs, you're not going to get work. But if it's a huge success, whether the criticism is good or bad, you'll work. The key thing is -- does the public accept you?"

Gossett appreciated Norris efforts to do comedy and said "I have great respect for what actors call stretch. Chuck had to open up first to allow this atmosphere. It has to do with his desire to stretch. Someone else could have been quite insecure. He chose to open up. He's studying hard and he's serious."

Filming took place in Mexico in June 1986.

"I learned to speak Spanish and had a splendid time," said Anderson. "Chuck was incredible to work with, such a nice man... J. Lee was a character. Some days the heat got to him worse than others. He would get tired and cranky, but we got along great. At the time, I had no idea the director in The Exorcist was based on him. And even though it was a Cannon film, I got all my money!”

== Release ==
Firewalker was released theatrically in the United States on November 21, 1986.

=== Home media ===
Firewalker was released on DVD by MGM Home Video March 22, 2005.

== Reception ==
=== Box office ===
The film was one of Cannon's strongest performing movies at the box office in 1986. However, it was a relative disappointment compared to other Norris films, earning a little over $10 million. It was ultimately considered a flop. Cannon went into financial receivership soon afterwards.

=== Critical response ===
On At the Movies, Gene Siskel and Roger Ebert gave the picture "two thumbs down". Siskel said Firewalker was "one of the most derivative films in years, splicing elements of Raiders of the Lost Ark with Romancing the Stone." He went on saying he believed "the movie was probably signed as a deal one month after the grosses started coming in for Romancing, and that was where the creativity stopped". Ebert said that he "would have tried to make a picture that didn't look like a cheap, watered-down, pale, and uninteresting version of all those other adventure movies". In his print review, Ebert gave Firewalker 1 star out of 4 wrote "the movie is a free-form anthology of familiar images from the works of Steven Spielberg, subjected to a new process that we could call discolorization...(the film) lacked the style, witty dialogue and magic of the current adventure movies, as it borrowed its closing images from the Indiana Jones films, but its press notes optimistically claim the picture is "in the tradition" of Romancing the Stone. In literature, it's called plagiarism. In the movies, it's homage.

Kevin Thomas of the Los Angeles Times, enjoyed it he explained "Firewalker isn't as elaborate or sophisticated as the Spielberg-Lucas hit, it is fun, and Norris is loosened up and laid back." Of the cast he said "really get into the light-hearted spirit of the occasion." His final thought was that it is "handsomely filmed in Mexico by Alex Phillips, Firewalker seems to have brought out the best in everyone on either side of the camera."

Vincent Canby of The New York Times called the film "a bargain-basement imitation of such movies as Indiana Jones and the Temple of Doom, Romancing the Stone, et al". Canby also noted Norris's lack of comedic timing as he "stomped on the film's facetious dialogue". TV Guide published a largely negative review, criticizing Norris's "usual wooden" performance, the "appalling" production values and the "flat, uninteresting" writing. The publication also noted Firewalker heavily "borrowing" elements from other, more successful adventure movies, calling it "a retooling of Raiders of the Lost Ark as a buddy picture".

Rick Bentley of The Town Talk liked it. He felt it had "proper blend of adventure and comedy" and wrote "the production is a lighthearted take off on adventure films with just enough action to keep the film moving at a good pace and enough gags to make certain no one takes the film too seriously." He enjoyed the acting by Norris, Gossett, and Anderson. He felt Norris handled comedy well in his first attempt at it. His final thought were it "is not great, but it never pretends to be. It is a light film which is entertaining to watchtend in the process provides a few laughs. You won't be burned by going to see Firewalker."

A review in Variety said, "Chuck Norris' latest outing for Cannon suffers from boilerplate scripting which sabotages what should have been a compelling buddy pic; not even the estimable Lou Gossett can save this one. Duo moves predictably through a search-for-the-gold yarn that is devoid of suspense."

Ed Severson of the Arizona Star called it "an entertaining turkey" and if you were after "a light weight action flick you'll get your money worth." He thought the two leads did a good job. He said that during his screening the audience responded very well to Norris doing comedy. He think that "Norris doesn't actually create humor. What he does is lighten up a little, which gets him laughs." His final thoughts were "Firewalker is a perfectly entertaining picture, as long as you don't expect everything you see to make sense."

Film historian Leonard Maltin seemed to agree, citing the picture as a "BOMB" and noting that "If Melody Anderson's hair (which remains perfectly intact throughout) and Sonny Landham's eyepatch (which keeps switching eyes) aren't a sign of anything, the movie's own press release described Chuck Norris's character as 'a soldier of outrageous misfortune'. Moreover, on the comedy-relief front, Norris brings to mind a now-famous description of Yogi Berra playing third base: 'Like a man pitching a pup-tent during a hurricane.' Arguably Chuck at his worst; but who wants to argue?"

In a review written by Rita Kempley of The Washington Post, Norris was described as pleasant galoot that lacked Arnold Schwarzenegger's (a more popular and successful action star) sense of self parody and comic timing. Kempley felt "the fight scenes were fine, but they only emphasize the plodding pace and the moldy plot; a blend of Poltergeist II, Temple of Doom and Romancing the Stone".

On Rotten Tomatoes the film has an approval rating of 8% based on reviews from 13 critics. On Metacritic the movie has a weighted average score of 37 out of 100, based on 8 critics, indicating "generally unfavorable" reviews.

== See also ==
- List of American films of 1986
- Chuck Norris filmography
