= Beverly Hills Madam =

- Also known as: Ladies of the Night
- Genre: Drama
- Written by: Nancy Sackett
- Directed by: Harvey Hart
- Starring: Faye Dunaway; Melody Anderson; Donna Dixon; Robin Givens
- Music by: Lalo Schifrin
- Country of origin: United States
- Original language: English

Production
- Executive producer: Nancy Sackett
- Producer: Everett Chambers
- Production locations: Los Angeles; Beverly Hills
- Cinematography: Isidore Mankofsky
- Running time: 96 minutes
- Production companies: Orion Pictures; NLS Productions

Original release
- Network: NBC
- Release: April 6, 1986

Beverly Hills Madam (also known as Ladies of the Night) is a 1986 American made-for-television drama film directed by Harvey Hart and starring Faye Dunaway, Melody Anderson, Donna Dixon and Robin Givens. It was originally broadcast on NBC on April 6, 1986.

== Plot ==
An escort agency caters to wealthy clients in Beverly Hills, California and is run by the elegant Lil Hutton. She has high standards, providing her girls with designer wardrobes and rigorous reading lists so they can easily socialize with high society. Lil has four young women in her employ: Wendy Benton, Claudia Winston, Julie Tyler, and April Baxter. Douglas Corbin is her loyal butler.

Claudia tries to escape the business when her wealthy boyfriend, Steven, proposes. However, a former client exposes Claudia's past. Enraged, Steven breaks off the engagement and a distraught Claudia tries to numb her heartbreak with alcohol. She wants to go back to work, but her drinking and general bad behavior aggravate Lil.

Julie is a naïve teenager who has just arrived from Nebraska. When all her possessions are stolen and the police wrongly arrest her for prostitution, Lil lets Julie stay in her mansion. Enchanted by the luxurious lifestyle of a high-class call girl, she becomes one of Lil's employees. Julie is hired by a father to take the virginity of his son, Justin, as an 18th birthday gift during a yacht trip. She and Justin declare their love for one another, and Julie is devastated when the family won't have anything to do with her after the trip. She tells Lil that she can't handle the emotional coldness of sex work and quits.

Wendy is a law student who struggles to balance school with work. She visits demanding client Len Culver in New York City just before her mid-terms. Unable to study enough, she flunks the test. Wendy then discovers that she's pregnant. When she informs Culver that he's the father, he tries to bribe her to go away. Wendy resists, and Lil tells her to take the payment for the baby if Wendy intends to keep it.

April is a dancer who half-heartedly works for Lil. Her lack of work ethic causes friction between the two women. One night, when Claudia isn't feeling well, April agrees to meet a new client. However, Lil fails to do a proper background check on the client and, as a result, April is murdered. Lil has a breakdown and leaves the business. Claudia, now cold-hearted and numbed by alcoholism, takes over the operation.

== Cast ==
- Faye Dunaway as Lil Hutton
- Melody Anderson as Claudia Winston
- Donna Dixon as Wendy Benton
- Terry Farrell as Julie Tyler
- Robin Givens as April Baxter
- Louis Jourdan as Douglas Corbin
- Marshall Colt as Steven Beck
- William Jordan as Len Culver
- Gary Hershberger as Justin
- Nicolas Coster as Uncle Edgar
- William Traylor as Taylor
- Seymour Cassel as Tony
- John Ingle as Law Professor
