= Flash Gordon (film) =

1980 film by Mike Hodges

- Theatrical release poster by Richard Amsel
- Directed by: Mike Hodges
- Screenplay by: Lorenzo Semple Jr.
- Based on: Characters by Alex Raymond
- Produced by: Dino De Laurentiis
- Starring: Sam J. Jones; Melody Anderson; Ornella Muti; Max von Sydow; Topol; Timothy Dalton; Mariangela Melato; Brian Blessed; Peter Wyngarde
- Cinematography: Gilbert Taylor
- Edited by: Malcolm Cooke
- Music by: Queen; Howard Blake
- Production companies: Starling Productions; Famous Films
- Distributed by: Columbia–EMI–Warner Distributors (United Kingdom); Universal Pictures (United States)
- Release dates: 5 December 1980 (United States); 11 December 1980 (United Kingdom)
- Running time: 114 minutes
- Countries: United Kingdom; United States
- Language: English
- Budget: $20–27 million
- Box office: $27.1 million (UK & US)

Flash Gordon is a 1980 space opera superhero film directed by Mike Hodges, based on the King Features comic strip of the same name created by Alex Raymond. The film stars Sam J. Jones in the title role, Melody Anderson, Ornella Muti, Max von Sydow and Topol, with Timothy Dalton, Mariangela Melato, Brian Blessed and Peter Wyngarde in supporting roles. The film follows star football quarterback Flash Gordon (Jones) and his allies Dale Arden (Anderson) and Hans Zarkov (Topol) as they unite the warring factions of the planet Mongo against the oppression of Ming the Merciless (von Sydow), who is intent on destroying Earth.

Producer Dino De Laurentiis, who had previously overseen two other comic book adaptations, Danger: Diabolik and Barbarella (both 1968), had held an interest in making a Flash Gordon film since the 1960s. After a directorial offer from George Lucas was declined (resulting in the creation of Star Wars) and a version that was to be directed by Federico Fellini did not enter production, De Laurentiis hired director Nicolas Roeg and Enter the Dragon writer Michael Allin to lead development on the film in 1977, but replaced them with Hodges and Lorenzo Semple Jr., who had scripted De Laurentiis' remake of King Kong, due to his dissatisfaction with Roeg's vision for the film.

Flash Gordon was primarily filmed in Britain, including on several soundstages at Elstree and Shepperton Studios, and uses a camp style similar to the 1960s TV series Batman (which Semple developed). Due to a dispute with De Laurentiis, Jones left the film prior to the end of principal photography, resulting in much of his dialogue being dubbed by actor Peter Marinker; the circumstances of Jones' departure from the project and his career in the aftermath of its release serve as the key subjects of the documentary Life After Flash. The musical score is by the rock band Queen, featuring orchestral sections by Howard Blake.

Although a box office success in both the United Kingdom and Italy, Flash Gordon performed poorly in other markets. Critical reception during and since the film's initial release has been generally favourable, and it has since gained a significant cult following.

== Plot ==
To relieve his boredom, Emperor Ming the Merciless of the planet Mongo begins Earth's destruction by remotely causing natural disasters. On Earth, football star Gregory "Flash" Gordon boards a small plane and meets travel agent Dale Arden. Mid-flight, the cockpit is hit by a meteor and the pilots die. Flash takes control and manages to crash land into a greenhouse owned by former NASA scientist, Dr. Hans Zarkov. Zarkov believes that the disasters are being caused by extraterrestrials pushing the Moon towards Earth. He has secretly constructed a spacecraft to investigate the attacks. Unable to do it alone, Zarkov lures Flash and Dale aboard. He flies with them to Mongo, where they are captured by Ming's troops.

After looking at the trio, Ming is smitten with Dale and orders Flash executed. At the last minute, Ming's daughter, Princess Aura, saves Flash, with whom she fell in love at first sight. While they escape, Zarkov is brainwashed by Klytus, the head of the secret police. Aura and Flash flee to Arboria, kingdom of Prince Barin. Locked in Ming's bedchamber, Dale escapes, and Zarkov is sent to intercept her. However, Zarkov reveals he resisted the brainwashing, and escapes Mingo City with Dale. They are quickly captured by Prince Vultan's hawkmen and taken to Sky City.

Aura and Flash arrive at Arboria. Aura asks the Prince to keep Flash safe. A distrustful Barin, in love with Aura, agrees not to kill Flash, but then forces him to play a deadly game of chance. With the odds stacked against him, Flash uses a trick to escape. Barin follows him, and they are both captured by the hawkmen.

Aura returns and is taken prisoner and tortured by Klytus and General Kala for her treason. Meanwhile, Ming prepares his wedding to Dale. Flash and Barin are taken to Sky City, where Flash and Dale are briefly reunited. Flash is forced to fight Barin in a death match. However, Flash instead saves Barin's life, causing Barin to join him. Klytus arrives, and Flash and Barin kill him. Knowing this will bring retribution, Vultan and the hawkmen evacuate, leaving Barin, Flash, Dale and Zarkov behind. Ming's ship arrives and captures Barin, Zarkov and Dale. Impressed with Flash, Ming offers him lordship over Earth in exchange for loyalty. Flash refuses and Ming gives the order to destroy Vultan's kingdom along with Flash. Finding a rocket cycle, Flash escapes before Sky City is destroyed.

Flash contacts Vultan, and they plot an attack on Mingo City. To defend the city, General Kala dispatches the war rocket Ajax, which is quickly seized by the hawkmen. Meanwhile, Princess Aura overpowers her guard and frees Barin and Zarkov from the execution chamber. Flash and the hawkmen attack Mingo City in Ajax and Kala activates the defenses as Ming's and Dale's wedding begins. Mingo City's lightning field can only be penetrated by flying Ajax into it at a suicidal speed. Flash volunteers to stay at the helm to ensure success and enable the hawkmen to invade the city.

Barin and Zarkov enter the control room and confront Kala. In the ensuing fight, Barin shoots and kills her.

After fighting through Ming's guards, Barin also manages to deactivate the lightning field before Ajax hits it. Flash flies the rocket ship into the city's wedding hall and impales Ming. Flash offers to spare his life if he stops the attack on Earth. Ming refuses and attempts to use his power ring on Flash, but it falters and nothing happens. He then aims the ring at himself and is seemingly vaporized by its remaining power. A victory celebration ensues.

Barin and Aura become the new leaders in Ming's place. Barin names Vultan the general of their armies. Flash, Dale and Zarkov discuss returning to Earth. Zarkov says he does not know how they will get back, but they will try.

Meanwhile, Ming's ring is picked up by an unseen person. Ming's evil laugh is heard closely after.

== Cast ==
- Sam J. Jones as Flash Gordon
  - Peter Marinker as Flash Gordon (some overdubbed lines)
- Melody Anderson as Dale Arden
- Max von Sydow as Emperor Ming the Merciless
- Topol as Dr. Hans Zarkov
- Ornella Muti as Princess Aura
- Timothy Dalton as Prince Barin
- Brian Blessed as Prince Vultan
- Peter Wyngarde as General Klytus
- Mariangela Melato as General Kala
- Richard O'Brien as Fico
- John Osborne as Arborian Priest
- Philip Stone as Zogi the High Priest
- John Hallam as General Luro
- Suzanne Danielle as Serving Girl
- John Morton as Airline pilot
- William Hootkins as Munson, Dr. Zarkov's assistant
- Robbie Coltrane as Man at Airfield
- Peter Duncan as Young Treeman
- John Hollis as Klytus Observer No. 2
- Leon Greene as Colonel of Battle Control Room
- Tony Scannell as Ming's officer
- Bogdan Kominowski as a lieutenant of Ming's Air Force
- George Harris as Prince Thun
- Deep Roy as Fellini, Princess Aura's pet
- Bob Goody as Azurian Man
- Kenny Baker as Dwarf
- Malcolm Dixon as Dwarf

== Production ==
=== Development ===
Since the 1960s, producer Dino De Laurentiis, having produced Danger: Diabolik and Barbarella, became interested in making a film based on Flash Gordon. Initially, De Laurentiis wanted Italian director Federico Fellini to direct the picture; although Fellini optioned the Flash Gordon rights from De Laurentiis, he never made the film. A character named Fellini (Deep Roy) was included in the film as a nod to the director, and the film featured lavish sets and costumes designed by his usual production designer Danilo Donati.

George Lucas attempted to make a Flash Gordon film in the 1970s; unable to acquire the rights from De Laurentiis, Lucas decided to create Star Wars instead. De Laurentiis then hired Nicolas Roeg to make the film, with Ferdinando Scarfiotti as production designer. Roeg, an admirer of the original Alex Raymond comic strips, spent a year in pre-production work. However, De Laurentiis was unhappy with Roeg's treatment of Flash Gordon, and Roeg left the project. De Laurentiis also considered hiring Sergio Leone to direct the Flash Gordon film; Leone refused, because he believed the script was not faithful to the original Raymond comic strips. De Laurentiis then hired Mike Hodges to direct, and Danilo Donati as production designer.

Lorenzo Semple Jr. wrote the script. He later recalled:

Dino wanted to make Flash Gordon humorous. At the time, I thought that was a possible way to go, but, in hindsight, I realize it was a terrible mistake. We kept fiddling around with the script, trying to decide whether to be funny or realistic. That was a catastrophic thing to do, with so much money involved... I never thought the character of Flash in the script was particularly good. But there was no pressure to make it any better. Dino had a vision of a comic-strip character treated in a comic style. That was silly, because Flash Gordon was never intended to be funny. The entire film got way out of control.

=== Casting ===
Newcomer Sam J. Jones was cast by De Laurentiis, after his mother-in-law Ivy Webb saw the actor on an episode of The Dating Game. At the time, Jones' only prior acting appearance was a supporting role in the romantic comedy 10 (1979). Jones bested both Kurt Russell and Arnold Schwarzenegger for the part. In preparation for the part, Jones would run for six-miles in London's Hyde Park twice a week, and studied Taekwondo.

Canadian model Dayle Haddon was originally cast as Dale Arden, but De Laurentiis replaced her with Melody Anderson after she showed-up to set looking "emaciated".

=== Filming ===
Principal photography took place entirely in the United Kingdom, mainly at Shepperton and Elstree Studios, and at a repurposed aircraft hangar in Weybridge. The airfield scene at the beginning of the film, although set in the U.S., was shot at the Broadford Airfield in Skye, Scotland.

For the Hawkmen scene, a sixty feet high and 100 feet wide blue-screen was built. To light the screen the team used clusters of quartz-halogen lights which required a million watts of power.

The production used a new optical compositing process created by visual effects expert Frank Van der Veer, which he claimed would cut the cost of the film's visual effects in half.

The film was promoted as having a budget of $35 million however, Variety noted more reliable sources suggested it was around $20 million, which they said was still a large outlay of money for such frivolity.

=== Post-production ===
According to a 2012 interview in Maxim, Sam J. Jones had disagreements with De Laurentiis of some kind and departed prior to post-production, which resulted in a substantial portion of his dialogue being dubbed by Canadian actor Peter Marinker; whose identity was long considered unknown, even to Jones. In 2020 interview in Yahoo! Movies, Mike Hodges stated Marinker only dubbed "five or ten minutes of dialogue." A sequel was proposed, but the departure of Jones effectively ended any such prospects.

== Soundtrack ==
The film's soundtrack was composed and performed by the rock band Queen. Flash Gordon was one of the earliest high-budget feature films to use a score primarily composed and performed by a rock band (an earlier example is The Who's Tommy, 1975). Additional orchestral score pieces were composed by Howard Blake. Blake's pieces from the film have been released on CD, alongside his score from Amityville 3-D.

== Release ==
The film was originally released in North America via Universal Studios. Universal has retained the domestic theatrical and home video rights, while the international rights passed on through different distributors, eventually residing with StudioCanal. However, the film's UK distributor, Thorn EMI, controlled U.S. TV rights. Although StudioCanal currently holds those rights due to ownership of the EMI film library, they licensed them to MGM for U.S. syndication.

== Reception ==
=== Box office ===
Flash Gordon opened on 825 screens in the United States and Canada and grossed $3,934,030 in its opening weekend, finishing top of the US box office. The following weekend, the film did less well, with a drop of 50% in grosses. In its third weekend, its average grosses fell a further 20% but grossed $2,394,000 from 1,400 screens. By the fourth weekend it was being pulled from major markets and had grossed $14.3 million in its first 24 days. It went on to gross $27,107,960 in the United States and Canada. It had a very strong showing in the United Kingdom, grossing nearly £14 million. Additionally, the film performed well in Italy, due to the two Italian actresses prominent in the credits.

=== Critical reception ===
The film received overall positive reviews, holding an 83% approval rating at the film review aggregator Rotten Tomatoes, based on 52 reviews. The film ranked No. 88 on the Rotten Tomatoes Journey Through Sci-Fi List (100 Best-Reviewed Sci-Fi Movies). Metacritic, which uses a weighted average, assigned the film a score of 58 out of 100, based on 13 critics, indicating "mixed or average" reviews.

The film found appreciation with some film critics, such as The New Yorker's Pauline Kael. Kael described Flash Gordon as having "some of the knowing, pleasurable giddiness of the fast-moving Bonds... The director, Mike Hodges, gets right into comic-strip sensibility and pacing". Todd McCarthy of Variety called it a "pretty but dumb sci-fi pic" which "lacks the wit and verve of Superman" however, thought it would be a good holiday moneymaker and that audiences might find the badness of Jones' performance part of the fun of the film. Roger Ebert also praised Flash Gordon, stating "Flash Gordon is played for laughs, and wisely so... This is space opera, a genre invented by Edgar Rice Burroughs and Hugo Gernsback and other men of unlimited imagination harnessed to definitely limited skills. It's fun to see it done with energy and love and without the pseudo-meaningful apparatus of the Force and Trekkie Power... Is it fun? Yeah, sort of, it is".

In contrast, Leslie Halliwell wrote in 1981 that the film was "another addition to the increasing numbers of such things being restaged at enormous expense fifty years after their prime". Richard Combs in the Monthly Film Bulletin called it "an expensively irrelevant gloss on its sources". Godfrey Fitzsimmons of The Irish Times said "Flash Gordon is a hodge-podge...the humour is not very funny and much of the "serious" element is hilarious, which makes for an unsatisfying film". Max von Sydow (Ming the Merciless) received a good deal of praise for his performance, but Jones (Gordon) was nominated for a Golden Raspberry Award for Worst Actor at the 1st Golden Raspberry Awards. Before the film's run in theaters, a sequel was considered and according to Brian Blessed on the Region 2 DVD commentary for Flash Gordon – Silver Anniversary Edition, the sequel was going to be set on Mars, as a possible update of the very successful Universal Pictures Flash Gordon serials starring Buster Crabbe.

Christopher John reviewed Flash Gordon in Ares magazine #6, commenting that "Flash Gordon could have been a good film, but the cheap shots, uneven acting, and too familiar story have destroyed what could have been a new classic".

Reviewing the film for The Encyclopedia of Fantasy, John Grant stated the film was "rather heavy-handed in its attempts at Parody" and that it used "stark garishness to compensate for appalling spfx"; he concluded that Flash Gordon "is a gaudy cliché whose charm should not be underestimated". John Clute gave Flash Gordon a mixed review, saying "the special effects are great" and praising the action sequences, but expressed dislike for Flash Gordon's humorous, self-aware tone, adding the actors "are all just playing, and we know it". Peter Nicholls in The Encyclopedia of Science Fiction gave a negative verdict on Flash Gordon: "Apart from the fetishistic costumes...there is little of interest in this tongue-in-cheek, lurid fantasy, which tries to make a comic-strip virtue of wooden acting". The Aurum Film Encyclopedia also gave the film an adverse review, claiming it was impossible to suspend disbelief in the film: "Hodges puts a knowingness and literalness that works completely against the sense of pulp poetry so essential if we are to believe in Flash". It also described Semple's script as "similarly bland, its occasional witticisms notwithstanding". Reviewing Flash Gordon for The Dissolve website, Keith Phipps stated: "Flash Gordon is, like Batman, entertaining for kids and a different sort of entertaining for grown-ups, who pick up on the goofiness... But there's more than a whiff of condescension to it, too, as if it's ridiculous to even consider Raymond's vision of clashing heroes and villains as anything but comedy fodder".

== Cult following ==
Flash Gordon has since become a cult classic. Edgar Wright used the film as one of the visual influences for Scott Pilgrim vs. the World. Comic book artist Alex Ross names the film as his all-time favourite. He painted the cover of the film's 2007 "Saviour of the Universe Edition" DVD release, and starred in a featurette to talk extensively about his affection for the film.

In 1987, Dalton beat Irish actors Pierce Brosnan and Sam Neill to become the fourth James Bond in The Living Daylights.

In Seth MacFarlane's 2012 comedy Ted, the characters of Ted (MacFarlane) and John Bennett (Mark Wahlberg) are fans of Flash Gordon, and is referenced several times throughout the film. Jones (playing himself) also appears in the film during a manic party sequence and in the film's conclusion. He also appears in the 2015 sequel Ted 2. Horror punk musician Wednesday 13 based the song "Hail Ming" on his album The Dixie Dead (2013) on the film.

Blessed's performance as Prince Vultan lodged the stage and screen actor into the United Kingdom's collective consciousness for the utterance of a single line – "Gordon's alive?!" – which, 40 years later, remains the most repeated, reused, and recycled quotation from both the film and Blessed's career.

The Dynamite Entertainment comic book series Flash Gordon: Zeitgeist drew on several elements of the 1980 film, including the reappearance of the villain Klytus (who does not appear in the original comic strips). In this adaptation, Klytus again serves as Ming's main henchman. The 2014 Dynamite Flash Gordon comic also contained several allusions to the film, including having Vultan speak the line "Gordon's alive?!".

In 2018, Life After Flash, a feature-length documentary directed by Lisa Downs and produced by Ashley Pugh, had its world premiere at Chattanooga Film Festival, followed by the European Premiere at the 72nd Edinburgh International Film Festival. Life After Flash not only celebrates the 1980 classic featuring interviews with cast, crew and fans including Melody Anderson, Brian Blessed, Peter Wyngarde, Mark Millar, Robert Rodriguez, Stan Lee and Brian May, but also explores the aftermath of when star Sam J. Jones went up against one of the most powerful producers in Hollywood: Dino De Laurentiis. It was released worldwide in 2019.

== In other media ==
A comic book adaptation, written by Bruce Jones and illustrated by classic Flash Gordon artist Al Williamson (himself not a fan of the film due to its overall campy nature, numerous script changes and resulting alterations to his artwork), was released by Western Publishing to coincide with the film's release. It was serialised in three issues of the Flash Gordon comic book (#31–33) and released in a single large format softcover and hardcover editions.

A novelization of the film by Arthur Byron Cover was published in 1980.

To coincide with and promote the film, Bally Manufacturing produced and released a Flash Gordon pinball machine in early 1981.

Flash Gordon, a video game adaptation for the Atari 2600 was developed by Sirius Software and published by Fox Video Games in 1983.

== Home media ==
The film was released in 1981 on VHS, Betamax and MCA DiscoVision, and re-released in 1998 on both Laserdisc and Region 1 DVD via Universal. It was released in Region 2 in 2001 (Japan) and again in 2005 (UK/Europe), with the 2005 release including commentary by Brian Blessed winning the "Commentary of the Year" award from Hotdog Magazine for his humor and enthusiasm. Universal Pictures released a "Saviour of the Universe Edition" DVD in North America in November 2007 to coincide with The Sci Fi Channel's new television series. This special edition does not include the cast and crew interviews of the Region 2 release.

In October 2007, a high definition transfer of the film premiered on the MGM HD cable/satellite channel.

In November 2007, Sam J. Jones and Melody Anderson together created a new commentary track for the StudioCanal DVD edition of the film. Flash Gordon was released on Blu-ray on 15 June 2010.

In 2012, Universal released Flash Gordon in a four-feature DVD set along with Battlestar Galactica: Saga of a Star World, The Last Starfighter and Dune.

Ted vs. Flash Gordon: The Ultimate Collection was released on Blu-ray plus Digital HD in May 2016, featuring this film and the unrated versions of Ted and Ted 2.

StudioCanal re-released the film on Blu-ray and 4K Blu-ray on 3 August 2020, sourced from a new 4K restoration of the original camera negative, which was approved by director Mike Hodges.

== Awards ==
- Saturn Awards

Nominated: Best Costumes (Danilo Donati)
Nominated: Best Science Fiction Film
Nominated: Best Supporting Actor (Max von Sydow)

- British Academy Film Awards

Nominated: Best Costumes Design (Danilo Donati)
Nominated: Best Original Film Music (Queen and Howard Blake)
Nominated: Best Art Design (Danilo Donati)

- Golden Raspberry Awards

Nominated: Worst Actor (Sam J. Jones)

- Hugo Awards

Nominated: Best Dramatic Presentation

- British Society of Cinematographers Awards

Nominated: Best Cinematography (Gil Taylor)

- Jupiter Awards

Nominated: Best Film
Nominated: Best Actress (Ornella Muti)

- Stinkers Bad Movie Awards

Nominated: Worst Actor (Sam J. Jones)
Winner: Worst On-Screen Couple (Sam J. Jones and Melody Anderson)

== Reboot ==
Since 2014, a new Flash Gordon film has been in the works. 20th Century Fox hired JD Payne and Patrick McKay as screenwriters, while Matthew Vaughn was in talks to direct. Mark Protosevich was hired to rewrite the film's script in January 2016. In October 2018, Overlord director Julius Avery was reportedly recruited as director.

An animated film was under development at Disney/Fox with Thor: Ragnarok director Taika Waititi writing and directing. In August 2019, the animated film was cancelled, but in July 2021, the film was revived with the plan to make it live-action.

== See also ==
- Flash Gordon
- Flesh Gordon (erotic parody)
