= Ebony White =

- The Spirit with Ebony White. The Spirit #10 (Fall, 1947), Quality Comics. Art by Reed Crandall.

Publication information
- First appearance: "The Origin of The Spirit" (June 2, 1940)
- Created by: Will Eisner

Ebony White is a fictional character from the 1940s syndicated newspaper comics series The Spirit, created by Will Eisner. He first appeared in the June 2, 1940 debut instalment of The Spirit and became one of the three major characters in the first nine years of The Spirit's twelve-year run, until being phased out in late 1949. He is a black sidekick to Denny Colt, the title character. His age is ambiguous: throughout most of his nine-year run he's portrayed as a resourceful young boy around twelve years of age, while at the beginning of the strip he is clearly an adult who drives a taxi. He frequently helps The Spirit out of tough situations.

== Racial connotations ==
The character is cited as an example of racial stereotyping in mainstream 20th century United States culture. His name is a racial pun and his short stature and exaggerated facial features – which include large white eyes and thick pinkish lips – are typical of the era's darkie interpretation of black people. He is routinely depicted as being less than five feet tall and resembles a stereotypical pickaninny. As a loyal assistant to the hero, he has been compared by a few critics to the classic/infamous Uncle Tom stereotype. However, the storyline refers to the character as The Spirit's unofficial ward/work partner, with the two sharing a home life in their Wildwood Cemetery headquarters, located beneath Denny Colt's tombstone. Despite his exaggerated, caricatured appearance & speech patterns, Ebony is always treated with respect by his fellow cast members and he develops beyond his comic-relief minstrel stereotype as the series progresses. Eisner later introduced other non-caricature African-American characters, such as the no-nonsense Detective Grey, who defied the media stereotypes of the day. Some of the later Ebony-era installments show The Spirit and the Dolan family sponsoring Ebony's formal education (the closeness of their relationship is illustrated by the crimefighter reading letters from his protégé to the Commissioner and other friends).

Eisner reported receiving letters of both praise and criticism for the character at the time. In a 1966 New York Herald Tribune feature by his former office manager-turned-journalist, Marilyn Mercer, Mercer stated that "Ebony never drew criticism from Negro groups (in fact, Eisner was commended by some for using him), perhaps because, although his speech pattern was early Minstrel Show, he himself derived from another literary tradition: he was a combination of Tom Sawyer and Penrod, with a touch of Horatio Alger hero, and color didn't really come into it."

When episodes of The Spirit were reprinted by Warren Publishing in the mid-1970s, a debate erupted in the letters pages about Ebony White's portrayal, with African-American readers weighing in on both sides about whether Ebony's portrayal felt hurtful, along with comments from the editors and other readers.

Eisner later expressed mixed feelings about his portrayal of Ebony White. He acknowledged that he was conscious at the time that he was using a racial stereotype but remained unapologetic about it, stating that "at the time humor consisted in our society of bad English and physical difference in identity." In reference to his graphic novel Fagin the Jew, Eisner acknowledged parallels between Charles Dickens' use of racial stereotyping for the Fagin character (which Eisner criticized) and Eisner's own portrayal of Ebony White but asserted that his own work had not "capitalized on" the stereotype.

== Strengths and personality ==
Appearances aside, Ebony was a well-heeled performer in The Spirit's efforts. Many are the occasions where Ebony disarms a villain and finds minutiae evidence The Spirit himself has overlooked. Although appearing to be about twelve years of age, Ebony is able to drive a car and occasionally works as a taxi driver; his occupation has given him an encyclopedic comprehension of Central City. In many stories, Ebony exhibited above average knowledge of science; for example, in one installment he constructed a Morse Code transmitter using a standard light bulb socket and an electric alarm. Ebony and The Spirit develop a son/father bond very early in the life of the strip and this is maintained through to Ebony's final appearance. The Spirit, Commissioner Dolan, Ellen Dolan and the Central City police force in general all hold Ebony noteworthy for his skill at field research and his instinctive understanding of human nature. Ellen and the police all consider Ebony as much their personal charge as he is The Spirit's, providing him with a loving family unit and appreciating his participation in crime-solving.

== Appearances ==
Ebony debuted (as a resourceful taxi-driver) in the first-ever Spirit Section, published Sunday June 2, 1940 and distributed in the Sunday editions of Register and Tribune Syndicate newspapers. He became a mainstay of the strip and the principal member of The Spirit's supporting cast, alongside Commissioner Eustace P. Dolan, until Eisner phased him out of the narrative in late 1949 and replaced him with another assistant, the Caucasian and blond-haired but far-less-capable Sammy. Ebony's last "starring" role in a Spirit story (a semi-regular event where he was the focus of the story rather than The Spirit himself, usually with a comic twist) was "Young Dr Ebony" published on Sunday May 29, 1949. Sammy first appeared in "The Ballgame" published on Sunday July 31, 1949 (as part of a six-episode story arc set in the South Seas, in which Ebony does not appear). Sammy returns to Central City with The Spirit (and is welcomed into the cast by Ebony, Commissioner Dolan and Ellen Dolan) in "The Return" published Sunday August 14, 1949. Ebony makes two wordless one-panel appearances over the next two weeks, in "The Candidate" published Sunday August 21, 1949 and "White Cloud" published August 28, 1949, before making his final appearance in five panels of "Lurid Love" (a humorous tale focused on Sammy's love life, similar in tone to earlier tales of Ebony's romantic exploits) published Sunday September 18, 1949. After one mention of his name in the text-based splash page of "The Inner Voice" published Sunday November 6, 1949, Eisner phased Ebony out of The Spirit Section (without fanfare or explanation) and Sammy functioned as The Spirit's assistant for nearly all of the strip's final three years. Ebony made one comeback solo appearance in "School is Out", published on June 24, 1951 and then disappeared again from the series until a few mostly-wordless earthbound appearances with Sammy during the "Outer Space Spirit" storyline that ended The Spirit in late 1952.

== Ev'ry Little Bug ==
Ebony is credited as the composer of the song "Ev'ry Little Bug" — which appeared regularly in the background of The Spirit Section between 1946 and 1950. The initial lines of the song were first uttered during the story "Poole's Toadstool Facial Cream" on June 9, 1946's Spirit Section and, by the end of 1946, all of the song's lyrics had appeared, sung by various characters in Central City. During 1947, Will Eisner collaborated with his World War II service buddy Bill Harr, who composed a melody for Eisner's lyrics. The completed song appeared in the April 27, 1947, Spirit Section, entitled "Ev'ry Li'l Bug" — a tale in which Ebony composes the song and the sheet music appears on the final page of the story. A couple of months later, in the June 29, 1947, section (entitled "Wiffenpoof"), Ebony persuades real-life operatic singer Robert Merrill to sing the tune. Shortly after this section appeared, "Ev'ry Little Bug" was published by the Robbins Music Corporation of New York as sheet music (with an image of Ebony on its cover page).

After three more appearances in the strip, "Ev'ry Little Bug" remained dormant until 1987, when music producer John Christensen assembled a recording featuring five versions of the tune, released by Kitchen Sink as a picture disc with an exclusive Spirit/Ebony image illustrated by Eisner. The record featured Bill Mumy (of Lost In Space fame) playing guitar on some of the tracks.

In total, "Ev'ry Little Bug" featured in twelve Spirit Sections:

- June 9, 1946 – "Poole's Toadstool Facial Cream"
- July 7, 1946 – "Dulcet Tone"
- October 13, 1946 – "The Heart of Rosie Lee"
- December 15, 1946 – "The Van Gaul Diamonds"
- December 29, 1946 – "Hubert The Duck"
- February 2, 1947 – "The Cosmic Answer"
- March 16, 1947 – "Hoagy the Yogi"
- April 27, 1947 – "Ev'ry Li'l Bug"
- June 29, 1947 – "Wiffenpoof"
- August 17, 1947 – "The Picnic"
- March 27, 1949 – "The Dummy"
- April 30, 1950 – "Wanted, Dangerous Job"

== Present ==
In DC Comics' Spirit comic-book series by Darwyn Cooke, which began in 2007, White is portrayed as a fourteen-year-old street kid, illegally driving a taxi. In an early appearance, the script alludes critically to his historic racist portrayal, with a character asking if he "will be standing on The Spirit's lawn with a lantern". He is portrayed as putting his street experience and his daring attitude to work at The Spirit's service. His origins are now tied to Colt's, with White being the cabbie who brought Colt to the place in which Colt apparently met his demise. Knowing of his death, a guilt-stricken White acknowledged that his previous prejudices against Colt, whom he had considered an amateurish detective afraid to sully his hands, were harsh, and that White could have helped him more. Colt, after awakening from his apparent death, then asked White for help. The youngster gladly accepted, keeping himself on call for his new friend. Commissioner Dolan later learns of White's illegal taxi setup but does nothing to stop him, instead letting his business slide.

The character also appears in Brian Azzarello's neo-noir First Wave universe, once again as the sidekick of The Spirit. Here Ebony is portrayed as a teenage girl rather than a young boy.

In the 2015 series Ebony White's real first name is "Aloysius" and now a private investigator working with a boy named "Sammy Strunk" (an update of Ebony's mid-1949 successor as the Spirit's partner) and his cousin Francis "Bolder" White.

== In other media ==
Ebony appears as a character named "Eubie" in the 1987 Spirit TV film, played by Bumper Robinson. Here, he is a young hustler who becomes The Spirit's sidekick following Denny Colt's awakening.

The character did not appear in the very-poorly-received December 2008 motion picture adaptation of Will Eisner's series.
