= Gary Kurtz =

American film producer (1940–2018)

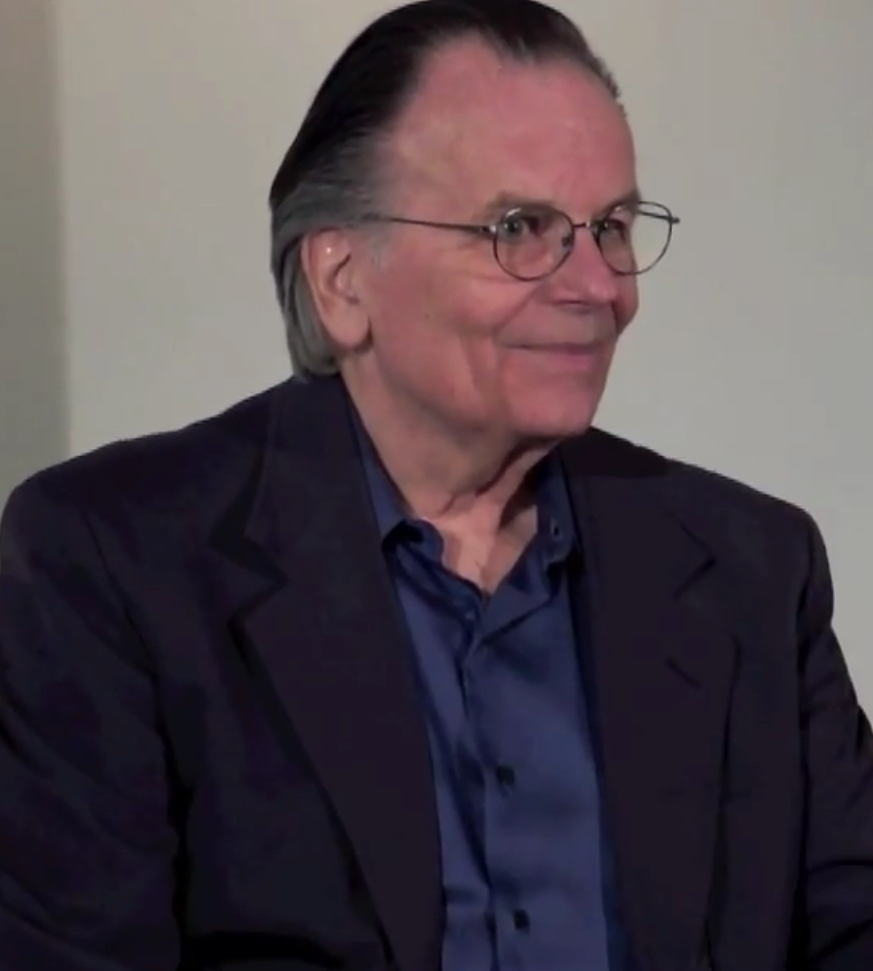
- Kurtz in 2012
- Born: Gary Douglas Kurtz; July 27, 1940; Los Angeles, California, U.S.
- Died: September 23, 2018 (aged 78); London, England
- Occupation: Film producer
- Years active: 1965–2018
- Spouses: Meredith Alsup Kurtz (m. 1963; div. 1983) Roberta Jimenez Kurtz (m. 1984; div. 1992) Clare Gabriel (m. 2003)
- Children: 3
- Awards: See Awards

Gary Douglas Kurtz (July 27, 1940 – September 23, 2018) was an American film producer whose list of credits includes American Graffiti (1973), Star Wars (1977), The Empire Strikes Back (1980), The Dark Crystal (1982) and Return to Oz (1985). Kurtz also co-produced the 1989 science fiction adventure film Slipstream, which reunited him with Star Wars star Mark Hamill.

== Early career ==
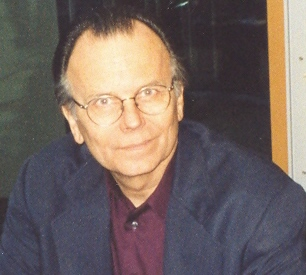
Kurtz in 2002

During 1965, Kurtz was an assistant director on a Monte Hellman Western, Ride in the Whirlwind, starring Jack Nicholson for Proteus Films. He then served as production manager on Voyage to the Prehistoric Planet with Basil Rathbone and Faith Domergue for American International Pictures. Kurtz additionally worked as an assistant director and second unit director, as well as a camera operator for the second unit, on the musical comedy Beach Ball for Paramount Pictures. In 1966, Kurtz was again production manager on Queen of Blood, with John Saxon, Basil Rathbone and Dennis Hopper, as well as acting as a sound technician on Blood Bath, both for American International Pictures. Kurtz then worked as an assistant camera operator on another Monte Hellman western, The Shooting, starring Warren Oates and Jack Nicholson, and finally wore multiple hats as production manager, assistant director and editor on the Harry Dean Stanton-starring The Hostage, both for Crown International Pictures.

Kurtz's film career was interrupted between 1966 and 1969, when he served in the U.S. Marine Corps. Raised as a Quaker, Kurtz enlisted as a conscientious objector, refusing to wear a sidearm, and served as a combat cameraman in Vietnam.

Upon leaving the military, Kurtz moved up to the world of studio pictures, acting as the associate producer on the neo-noir Warren Oates-starring Chandler for Metro-Goldwyn Mayer; and Two-Lane Blacktop with Monte Hellman for Universal Pictures, both in 1971.

== Collaboration with George Lucas and Lucasfilm ==
=== American Graffiti ===
Gary Kurtz and George Lucas's first collaboration was on the 1973 film American Graffiti. Lucas and producer Kurtz initially took the script to American International Pictures, which expressed interest but ultimately deemed American Graffiti not violent or sexual enough by the studio's standards. The pair eventually found favor at Universal Pictures, who allowed Lucas total artistic control and the right of final cut privilege on the condition that he and Kurtz make American Graffiti on a strict, low budget.

Universal initially projected a $600,000 budget, but added an additional $175,000 once producer Francis Ford Coppola signed on to co-produce with Kurtz. This would allow the studio to advertise American Graffiti as "From the Man Who Gave You The Godfather." Production proceeded with virtually no input or interference from Universal.

The film was released in the United States on August 1, 1973, to sleeper hit reception. The film cost only $1.27 million to produce and market, but yielded worldwide box-office gross revenues of more than $55 million. It had only modest success outside the United States, but became a cult film in France. Universal reissued Graffiti in 1978 and earned an additional $63 million, which brought the total revenue for the two releases to $118 million. At the end of its theatrical run, American Graffiti had one of the best cost-to-profit ratios of any motion picture ever. It was the 13th-highest-grossing film of all time in 1977, and, adjusted for inflation, was the 43rd highest as of 2009. By the 1990s, American Graffiti had earned more than $200 million in box office gross and home video sales. In December 1997, Variety reported that the film had earned an additional $55.13 million in rental revenue.

American Graffiti went on to receive widespread critical acclaim. Based on 33 reviews collected by Rotten Tomatoes, 97% of the critics enjoyed the film with an average score of 8.3/10. The consensus reads, "One of the most influential of all teen films, American Graffiti is a funny, nostalgic, and bittersweet look at a group of recent high school grads' last days of innocence."

Kurtz and Coppola were nominated for the Academy Award for Best Picture but lost to The Sting. Further nominations at the 46th Academy Awards included Best Director (George Lucas), Best Original Screenplay (Lucas, Willard Huyck and Gloria Katz), Best Supporting Actress (Candy Clark) and Best Film Editing (Verna Fields and Marcia Lucas). Kurtz and Coppola went on to win the Best Motion Picture (Musical or Comedy) at the 31st Golden Globe Awards, while Paul Le Mat won Most Promising Newcomer. Lucas was nominated for Best Director and Richard Dreyfuss was nominated for Best Actor in a Comedy or Musical. More nominations included Cindy Williams by the British Academy of Film and Television Arts for Best Actress in a Supporting Role, Lucas for the Directors Guild of America Award for Outstanding Directing, and Lucas, Huyck and Katz by the Writers Guild of America for Best Original Comedy.

In 1995, the film was selected for preservation in the National Film Registry by the Library of Congress for being "culturally, historically, and aesthetically significant."

In 1973, at approximately the same time as he began his collaboration with George Lucas, Kurtz formed his own company, Kinetographics, in San Rafael, California.

=== Star Wars ===
Kurtz continued his collaboration with Lucas on Star Wars (later subtitled Episode IV – A New Hope), released in 1977.

When principal photography began on Star Wars on March 22, 1976, in the Tunisian desert for the scenes on the planet Tatooine, the project faced several problems. Lucas fell behind schedule in the first week of shooting due to a rare Tunisian rainstorm, malfunctioning props and electronic breakdowns. He also clashed with cinematographer Gilbert Taylor, whom Kurtz called "old-school" and "crotchety".

Produced with a budget of $11 million and released on May 25, 1977, the film earned $460 million in the United States and $314 million overseas, surpassing Jaws as the nominal highest-grossing film and remaining that way until being surpassed by E.T. the Extra-Terrestrial in 1982. When adjusted for inflation, it is the second-highest-grossing film in the U.S. and Canada and is the third-highest-grossing in the world as of 2012.

Among the many awards the film received were ten Academy Award nominations, winning six; the nominations including Kurtz himself for Best Picture, and Alec Guinness for Best Supporting Actor. The film is often ranked among the best films of all time.

In 1989, it was selected for preservation in the National Film Registry by the Library of Congress for being "culturally, historically, and aesthetically significant."

=== The Empire Strikes Back ===
Kurtz's final collaboration with Lucas, The Empire Strikes Back, was an expensive and difficult production. Records at Elstree Studios indicate that the movie took 175 shooting days, having been budgeted at 100, which forced Lucas to borrow $10 million to complete the film. Kurtz had to help direct along with David Tomblin, Irvin Kershner, Harley Cokeliss and John Barry (who died of meningitis during production) to bring the film in on even this revised schedule and budget. The actual completion of photography occurred a month after the film's 'wrap party' in late August 1979, which Kurtz and his wife hosted. Kurtz was actively involved from post production through its release in theatres in the US and the UK, but was replaced four weeks before filming wrapped by Howard Kazanjian. On Kurtz's parting of ways with Lucasfilm following the movie's release, Kazanjian took over the producer's reins for Return of the Jedi. Kurtz later claimed he decided not to produce the latter film as he found its story to be too commercial, as well as redundant of the first film in the trilogy.

The Empire Strikes Back was released on May 21, 1980, becoming the most critically acclaimed chapter in the Star Wars saga and one of the most highly rated films in history. It earned more than $538 million worldwide over the original run and several re-releases, making it highest-grossing film in 1980. When adjusted for inflation, it is the twelfth-highest-grossing film in the U.S. and Canada as of 2012.

In 2010, the film was selected for preservation in the National Film Registry by the Library of Congress for being "culturally, historically, and aesthetically significant."

== Productions post-Lucasfilm ==
Kurtz claimed that he and George Lucas clashed over how to progress the Star Wars series. Kurtz claimed that after Raiders of the Lost Ark in 1981, Lucas became convinced that audiences no longer cared about the story and were simply there for thrills and entertainment, and began to deviate from the originally planned plotlines for Return of the Jedi, at which point Kurtz quit the series—though opposing sources state that he was fired by Lucas due to his mishandling of The Empire Strikes Back, which went massively overbudget and overschedule. Kurtz also claimed Lucas changed the emphasis from storytelling to prioritizing toy merchandising. In a 2010 interview for the L.A. Times, Kurtz revealed he had become disillusioned with what he saw as the commercially driven direction the franchise was taking, as well as the related changes that Lucas made to the plot of the third movie, which was originally much darker, and supposedly included the death of Han Solo. He stated that:

I could see where things were headed. The toy business began to drive the empire. It's a shame. They make three times as much on toys as they do on films. It's natural to make decisions that protect the toy business but that's not the best thing for making quality films.

Kurtz was particularly displeased with Lucas's decisions in Return of the Jedi to resurrect the Death Star and to change the plot outline from one that ended on a "bittersweet and poignant" note to one having a "euphoric ending where everyone was happy".

Kurtz later expressed his dissatisfaction with the 1997 Star Wars Special Editions and Star Wars: Episode I – The Phantom Menace.

=== The Dark Crystal ===
Kurtz's next production was The Dark Crystal, a 1982 American-British fantasy film directed by Jim Henson and Frank Oz. The screenplay was written by David Odell, who had previously worked with Henson as a staff writer on The Muppet Show. The film was shot at Elstree Studios, and exterior scenes were shot in the Scottish Highlands; Gordale Scar, North Yorkshire, England; and Twycross, Leicestershire, England. At the scoring stage, Kurtz had composer Trevor Jones scrap his initial notion of reflecting the settings' oddness by using acoustical instruments, electronics and building structures, in favor of a more sweeping orchestral score so as not to alienate audiences.

The Dark Crystal was released in 858 theaters in North America on December 17, 1982. Initially going up against heavy Christmas competition, including Tootsie and the already massively successful E.T. the Extra-Terrestrial, the film nevertheless presented substantial staying power in its following weeks and into 1983. By the end of its U.S. box office run, it had made $40,577,001 domestically, profiting over its modest $15 million budget. On its international release later in 1983, The Dark Crystal continued to add to its U.S. box office takings, was the highest-grossing box office release for the year in both France and Japan, and managed to out-gross E.T. as the most successful foreign film in Japan until Titanic took over the spot 14 years later. The film has gained a cult following over the years since its release.

=== Little Nemo: Adventures in Slumberland ===
Japanese producer Yutaka Fujioka had approached George Lucas in 1978 to help produce a film of Little Nemo in Slumberland, but Lucas found problems with the storyline, as did American animator Chuck Jones. The project was officially announced in 1982, and Kurtz' company TMS/Kinetographics began to recruit staff. Kurtz was brought onto the production and appointed producer of the American production side, initially hiring Ray Bradbury and later Edward Summer to write screenplays. Japanese animators Hayao Miyazaki and Isao Takahata were briefly involved, but left due to creative differences with Fujioka. Miyazaki later described his involvement on the film as "the worst experience of his professional career." Kurtz himself would likewise step down in the fall of 1984. Many writers and filmmakers followed Kurtz in boarding and leaving the project over the years. Eventually, the film was released in Japan, on July 15, 1989, under the title Little Nemo: Adventures in Slumberland.

=== Return to Oz ===
Kurtz next production was Return to Oz, a 1985 fantasy adventure film based on L. Frank Baum's Oz books, in particular The Marvelous Land of Oz and Ozma of Oz. Directed by Walter Murch, an editor and sound designer, development began 1980 during a brainstorming session with Murch and Walt Disney Pictures production chief Tom Wilhite. In the time between the development period and actual shooting, there was a change of leadership at the Walt Disney studios, with Wilhite being replaced by Richard Berger, and the movie's budget increased. Once shooting began, Murch began to fall behind schedule, leading to pressure from the studio, with Murch being fired as director for a short period before later being reinstated. Unfortunately, the film did not draw in an audience in theaters and the film was considered a flop upon release.

The film received an Academy Award nomination for Best Visual Effects, but lost to Cocoon. Fairuza Balk and Emma Ridley were nominated for Young Artist Awards. The film received three Saturn Award nominations for Best Fantasy Film, Best Younger Actor for Fairuza Balk, and Best Costumes for Raymond Hughes.

=== Slipstream ===
Slipstream proved to be a disastrous financial and critical flop. Its failure reportedly drove Kurtz into bankruptcy. Slipstream had a short cinema run in the United Kingdom, where it was considered a flop, and Australia, where the film grossed just $66,836 during its entire theatrical run. The film was never released in theaters in North America and enjoyed only moderate VHS sales. Fans awaiting a director's cut have been disappointed after Kurtz said in an interview that the script was originally much more violent, but that these violent scenes, which would have made the plot more coherent, were never filmed.

As of December 2019, the film has a "no consensus" score on Rotten Tomatoes of 43%.

== Awards ==
Gary Kurtz and the films he has produced have both been nominated for and won a number of awards. Below is a selection of the main "Best Picture" awards and nominations. The pages of individual films contain more detailed breakdowns of cast and crew awards.

| Year | Film | Role | Notes |
|---|---|---|---|
| 1977 | Star Wars | Producer | Nominated for the Academy Award for Best Picture; Nominated for the Golden Globe Award for Best Motion Picture – Drama at the 32nd Golden Globe Awards; Won Best Film from the Los Angeles Film Critics Association in 1977; Nominated for the Best Film by the British Academy of Film and Television Arts in 1979; Won the Best Film at the 1978 Evening Standard British Film Awards; Won Best Foreign Language Film at the 1978 Hochi Film Awards; Nominated for Best Foreign Language Film at the 1979 Japan Academy; Won the 1978 People's Choice Awards in the category of Favorite Motion Picture; Won the Hugo Awards in the category of Best Dramatic Presentation, Long Form; Won Best Science Fiction Film at the 5th Saturn Awards |
| 1980 | The Empire Strikes Back | Producer | Won the 1981 People's Choice Awards in the category of Favorite Motion Picture; Won the Hugo Awards in the category of Best Dramatic Presentation, Long Form; Won Best Science Fiction Film at the 8th Saturn Awards |
| 1982 | The Dark Crystal | Producer | Won Best Fantasy Film at the 10th Saturn Awards; Won the Grand Prize at the 1983 Avoriaz Avoriaz Fantastic Film Festival; Nominated for the Hugo Awards in the category of Best Dramatic Presentation, Long Form |
| 1985 | Return to Oz | Producer | Nominated for Best Fantasy Film at the 13th Saturn Awards |

== Filmography ==
=== Films ===
==== Producer ====
He was producer for all films unless otherwise noted.

| Year | Film | Credit | Notes |
|---|---|---|---|
| 1971 | Two-Lane Blacktop | Associate producer | |
| 1971 | Chandler | Associate producer | |
| 1973 | American Graffiti | Co-producer | |
| 1977 | Star Wars | | a.k.a. Star Wars: Episode IV – A New Hope |
| 1980 | The Empire Strikes Back | | a.k.a. Star Wars: Episode V – The Empire Strikes Back |
| 1982 | The Dark Crystal | | |
| 1985 | Return to Oz | Executive producer | |
| 1989 | Slipstream | | |
| 1993 | The Thief and the Cobbler | | Uncredited |
| 1995 | The Steal | | |
| 2014 | Centurion Resurrection | | Short film |
| 2016 | Gangster Kittens | Executive producer | |
| 2022 | 5-25-77 | | Released posthumously |

==== Second unit director or assistant director ====
| Year | Film | Credit | Notes |
|---|---|---|---|
| 1965 | Beach Ball | Assistant director / second unit director | |
| 1966 | Ride in the Whirlwind | Assistant director | |
| 1967 | The Hostage | Assistant director | |
| 1980 | The Empire Strikes Back | Assistant director / director: studio second unit | a.k.a. Star Wars: Episode V – The Empire Strikes Back |
| 1980 | The Empire Strikes Back | Assistant director / director: studio second unit | Uncredited |
| 1982 | The Dark Crystal | Second unit director | |

==== Director ====
| Year | Film | Notes |
|---|---|---|
| 1962 | Exercise No. One | Short film |

==== Production manager ====
| Year | Film | Notes |
|---|---|---|
| 1965 | Voyage to the Prehistoric Planet | Edited from Планета бурь (1962, USSR film) |
| 1966 | Queen of Blood | |
| 1967 | The Hostage | |

==== Actor ====
| Year | Film | Credit | Notes |
|---|---|---|---|
| 1974 | The Godfather: Part II | Photographer in Court | Uncredited |

==== Camera and electrical department ====
| Year | Film | Credit | Notes |
|---|---|---|---|
| 1965 | Beach Ball | Camera operator: second unit | Uncredited |
| 1966 | The Shooting | Assistant camera | |

==== Editor ====
| Year | Film |
|---|---|
| 1967 | The Hostage |
| 1970 | Imago |

==== Sound department ====
| Year | Film | Credit |
|---|---|---|
| 1966 | Blood Bath | Sound |

==== Thanks ====
| Year | Film | Credit | Notes |
|---|---|---|---|
| 1990 | Disney Sing-Along-Songs: Disneyland Fun | Special thanks | Video short film |
| 2004 | Empire of Dreams: The Story of the Star Wars Trilogy | Acknowledgment: stills and posters courtesy of / special thanks | Video documentary film |
| 2007 | Return to Oz: The Joy That Got Away | Dedicatee | Documentary film |
| 2015 | Qing bi shan gao | Special thanks | |

=== Television ===
==== Producer ====
He was producer for all projects unless otherwise noted.

| Year | Film | Credit | Notes |
|---|---|---|---|
| 1977 | The Making of Star Wars | Executive producer | Television documentary film |
| 1992 | Mickey's Nutcracker | | Television special short |
| 2004 | The Tale of Jack Frost | Co-executive producer | Television film |
| 2004 | The Tale of Jack Frost | Co-executive producer | Uncredited |
| 2007 | Friends and Heroes | | Television series, 13 episodes |
| 2008 | Resistance | Executive producer | Television series, urknown episodes |

==== Production manager ====
| Year | Film | Credit | Notes |
|---|---|---|---|
| 2008 | Friends and Heroes | Pre-production supervisor | Television series, 13 episodes |

==== Animation department ====
| Year | Film | Credit | Notes |
|---|---|---|---|
| 2000 | The Animated Odyssey | Animation supervisor | Television mini-series, 4 episodes |

==== Thanks ====
| Year | Film | Credit | Notes |
|---|---|---|---|
| 2004 | The Tale of Jack Frost | Thanks: Corsham Entertainment Ltd. | Television film |

== Incomplete projects ==
- The Spirit with Will Eisner, Jerry Rees, Brad Bird
- Teefr with Edward Summer
- Once... a.k.a. The Thief and the Cobbler with Richard Williams
- A New Atlantis with Edward Summer, Richard Edlund
- Panzer 88 with Peter Briggs

== Personal life ==
Kurtz was married first to Meredith Alsup and then to Roberta Jiminez. However, both of these marriages ended in divorce. He had two daughters, Tiffany and Melissa, with Alsup and a son, Dylan, with Jiminez. His final marriage was to Clare Gabriel and this endured until his death. Born in Los Angeles, he moved to London, England for the production of Star Wars and elected to permanently remain and raise his family there. He was a Quaker. He was also a member of the Church of Jesus Christ of Latter-day Saints. He died of cancer in North London on September 23, 2018 aged 78.

== Bibliography ==
- Dale Pollock (1999). Skywalking: The Life and Films of George Lucas. New York City: Da Capo Press. ISBN 0-306-80904-4.
- Scheib, R. (May 2010). "Review: The Dark Crystal". Moria: The Science Fiction, Horror and Fantasy Film Review. Christchurch, NZ. Archived from the original on July 24, 2011.
- "An Interview with Trevor Jones". Cinemascore. Randall D. Larson. May 24, 2011. Archived from the original on June 3, 2011.
