= Melody Anderson =

Canadian-American actress (born 1955)

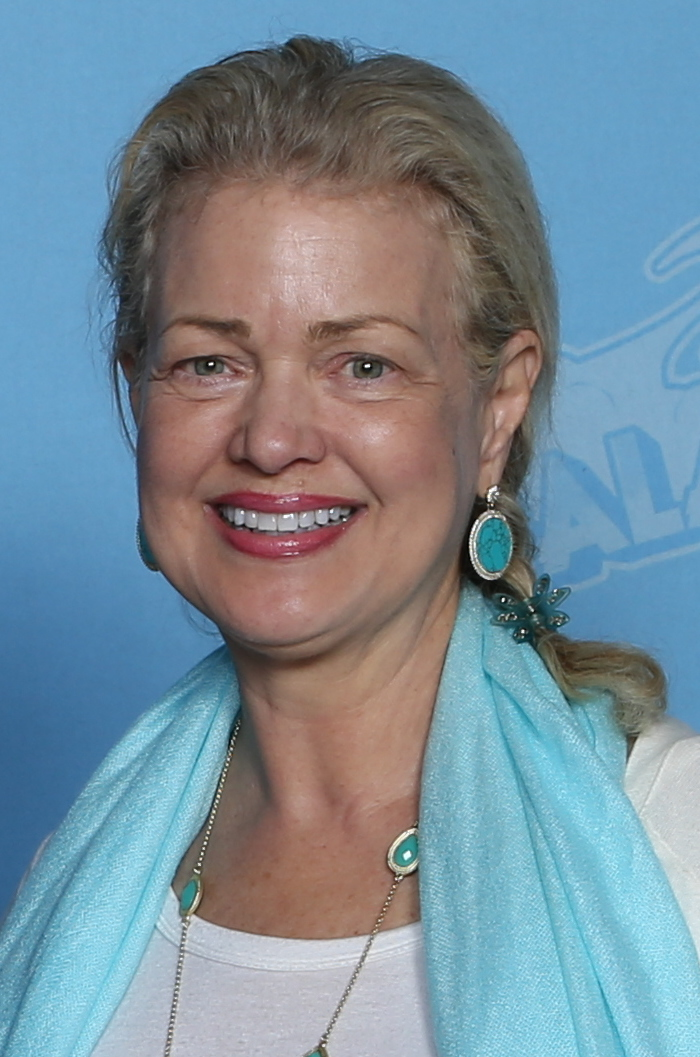
- Anderson in 2020
- Born: December 3, 1955 (age 70); Edmonton, Alberta, Canada
- Education: Carleton University (BA); New York University (MSW)
- Occupations: Actress; social worker; public speaker
- Years active: 1976–present
- Known for: All My Children; Flash Gordon; Firewalker

Melody Anderson (born December 3, 1955) is a Canadian former actress, social worker, and public speaker specializing in the impact of addiction on families. As an actress, her most high-profile role was playing Dale Arden in the 1980 adaptation of Flash Gordon. She later starred in the 1986 film Firewalker, with Chuck Norris. While singing, she also trained as an actress, leading to roles in films and television during the late 1970s and 1980s.

== Early life ==
After high school, Anderson completed a bachelor's degree in Journalism from Carleton University in Ottawa, Ontario. She served a brief stint as an on-air reporter for the Canadian Broadcasting Corporation before travelling to Southeast Asia and Australia. Anderson appeared in the first 1977 Victoria's Secret catalog and also appeared as a Rigid Tools model.

== Career ==
=== Acting ===
Returning to North America, Anderson's first national exposure was as a guest star in the 1977 series Logan's Run and as a "Sweathog" in a 1977 episode of Welcome Back, Kotter. She made numerous guest appearances on television, including Archie Bunker's Place, Battlestar Galactica, Dallas, T. J. Hooker, CHiPs, the pilot episode of The A-Team and The Fall Guy. She had recurring roles on St. Elsewhere and Jake and the Fatman. She was the female lead of the NBC 1983 series Manimal. She was a guest star in the Murder, She Wrote episode "Prediction: Murder" in 1989.

Anderson played the female lead Dale Arden in Flash Gordon (1980) and Janet Gillis in Dead and Buried (1981). In 1983, she played the title role in a made-for-television film called Policewoman Centerfold, in which her character, a divorced police officer, is fired after posing nude for a men's magazine (based loosely on the true story of Springfield, Ohio patrolwoman Barbara Schantz, who was subsequently fired from her job after posing nude in Playboy magazine in the early 1980s).

In 1986, she appeared with Nicolas Cage in The Boy in Blue and with Chuck Norris in Firewalker. She starred in the made-for-television movie Beverly Hills Madam (1986), which starred Faye Dunaway. From August, 1992 to July, 1993, Anderson assumed the role of long running character Natalie Marlowe, and briefly her twin sister Janet Dillon, on the soap opera All My Children from Kate Collins. She starred as Edie Adams in the television film Ernie Kovacs: Between the Laughter, opposite Jeff Goldblum as Ernie Kovacs and played the coveted role of Marilyn Monroe in the television movie Marilyn & Bobby: Her Final Affair (1993). Her last television appearance was in 1995 as a guest star in the short-lived CBS revival of Burke's Law.

Anderson has made appearances at genre conventions, such as the October 2009 Big Apple Convention in Manhattan.

=== Social work ===
Anderson is licensed as a Certified EMDR Clinician/Therapist and a Licensed Clinical Social Worker (LCSW) in New York and California. She facilitates therapy groups at several treatment centers in the Los Angeles area. An international lecturer and media spokesperson on addictions and the family, she has made presentations on substance abuse and other mental health-related areas of study.

== Filmography ==
=== Film ===
Year	Title	Role	Notes
1980	Flash Gordon	Dale Arden	
1981	Dead & Buried	Janet Gillis	
1986	The Boy in Blue	Dulcie	
1986	Firewalker	Patricia Goodwin	
1989	Speed Zone	Lea Roberts	
1991	Under Surveillance	Cathy Meadows	
1992	Landslide	Clair Trinavant	

=== Television ===
Year	Title	Role	Notes
1977	Welcome Back, Kotter	Blonde Sweathog	Episode: "Sweathog Back-to-School Special"
1978	Logan's Run	Shelia	Episode: "Carousel"
1979	Pleasure Cove	Julie	Television film
1979	Elvis	Bonnie	Television film
1979	Battlestar Galactica	Brenda Maxwell	Episode: "Experiment in Terra"
1979	B. J. and the Bear	Toni	Episode: "Wheels of Fortune"
1982	Archie Bunker's Place	Cheryl	Episode: "Gary's Ex"
1982	Dallas	Linda Farlow	Episode: "The Big Ball"
1982	T. J. Hooker	Kate Nichols	Episode: "Terror at the Academy"
1982	The Fall Guy	Mary / Mary Walker	2 episodes
1983	CHiPs	Emily	Episode: "Day of the Robot"
1983	The A-Team	Avon	Episode: "Mexican Slayride"
1983	St. Elsewhere	Nurse Jill Roberts	5 episodes
1983	Manimal	Brooke McKenzie	8 episodes
1983	Policewoman Centerfold	Jennifer Oaks	Television film
1984	Ernie Kovacs: Between the Laughter	Edie Adams	Television film
1984	High School U.S.A.	Cindy Franklin	Television film
1986	Hotel	Lauren Moffat	Episode: "Triangles"
1986	Beverly Hills Madam	Claudia Winston	Television film
1986	Philip Marlowe, Private Eye	Rhonda Farr	Episode: "Blackmailers Don't Shoot"
1987	Deep Dark Secrets	Julianne Wakefield	Television film, AKA Intimate Betrayal
1989	Murder, She Wrote	Katherine Aaron	Episode: "Prediction: Murder"
1989	The Hitchhiker	Sterling	Episode: "The Cruelest Cut"
1989	Final Notice	Kate Davis	Television film
1990	Hitler's Daughter	Sharon Franklin / Mary Lipscomb	Television film
1991–1992	Jake and the Fatman	Neely Capshaw	6 episodes
1992–1993	All My Children	Natalie Marlowe / Janet Dillon	61 episodes
1993	Marilyn & Bobby: Her Final Affair	Marilyn Monroe	Television film
1995	Burke's Law	Alexandra Kohl	Episode: "Who Killed the World's Greatest Chef?"
