= Chattanooga Film Festival =

American film festival

- Location: Chattanooga, Tennessee
- Started: 2014
- Founded by: Chris Dortch
- Website: chattfilmfest.org

The Chattanooga Film Festival (CFF) is an annual genre film festival that takes place in Chattanooga, Tennessee. It was chosen in 2019, 2020 and 2021 as one of the "30 Best Genre Film Fests in the World" by MovieMaker.

== History ==
The Chattanooga Film Festival originated in February 2009 as a film club in Chattanooga, Tennessee known as Mise En Scenesters. The organizers of the club launched a Halloween event known as the Frightening Ass Film Festival, which led to the creation of the Chattanooga Film Festival. The 1st annual Chattanooga Film Festival took place in 2014.

In a joint initiative with the Canadian company Media Darling, the Chattanooga Film Festival founded the Good Film Fund as a means of supporting the production and promotion of films.

As a result of the COVID-19 pandemic, the 7th, 8th, and 9th annual Chattanooga Film Festival events took place online as a virtual event.

== See also ==
- List of fantastic and horror film festivals
