= Linhe =

Linhe may refer to the following places in China:

- Linhe District (临河区), a district in Baynnur, Inner Mongolia
- Linhe Subdistrict (林和街道), a subdistrict of Tianhe District, Guangzhou, Guangdong

== Towns ==
- Linhe, Jiangsu (临河), in Siyang County, Jiangsu
- Linhe, Ningxia (临河), in Lingwu, Ningxia
- Linhe, Shaanxi (蔺河), in Langao County, Shaanxi

== Townships ==
- Linhe Township, Hebei (临河乡), in Xian County, Hebei
- Linhe Township, Henan (临河乡), in Xi County, Henan

== See also ==
- Lin He (disambiguation)
- Linghe (disambiguation)
