= Joseph Li Liangui =

Current Catholic bishop of Xianxian (born 1964)

The Most Reverend Joseph Li Liangui
- Bishop of Xianxian
- Predecessor: Petrus Hou Jingwen

Orders
- Ordination: 19 March 1991
- Consecration: 20 March 2000 by John Liu Dinghan

Personal details
- Born: 26 January 1964 (age 62) Xian County, Cangzhou, Hebei, China
- Denomination: Catholic
- Motto: Omnia Possibilia Apud Deum

Styles of Joseph Li Liangui
- Reference style: The Most Reverend
- Spoken style: Your Excellency
- Religious style: Bishop

Joseph Li Liangui (Chinese: 李连贵, born 26 January 1964) is a Chinese Catholic priest and the current bishop of Roman Catholic Diocese of Xianxian.

== Biography ==
Li was born on 26 January 1964 in Baixing Village (Chinese: 百姓庄), Xian County, Hebei. He was ordained as a priest on 19 March 1991. He first headed the minor seminary of the Diocese of Xianxian. He was then promoted to be the executive vice president of Hebei Major Seminary.

In 1997, Li became the coadjutor bishop of the diocese. In 1999, Petrus Hou Jingwen, the bishop of Xianxian, died in a car accident. Li was elected as a bishop candidate for the diocese in November 1999, and began to oversee the diocese from December. On 20 March 2000, Li was consecrated bishop at the Sacred Heart Cathedral, Xianxian by John Liu Dinghan, retired bishop of Xianxian. In 2004, Li assisted Bishop Liu in the consecration of Peter Feng Xinmao as the bishop of the Roman Catholic Diocese of Jingxian.

In March 2010, Savio Hon Tai-fai, then secretary of the Congregation for the Evangelization of Peoples, said that Li, who refused the will of the Chinese Communist Party, was undergoing seclusion and political education. In November 2010, Li and other seven Chinese Catholic bishops took part in the episcopal consecration of Joseph Guo Jincai at Pingquan Catholic Church, Chengde. The consecration was without Vatican approval. The Holy See claimed that Li and other bishops were coerced into attending the consecration, but the Chinese Catholic Patriotic Association denied the claim.

== See also ==
- Christianity in Hebei
- China-Holy See relations

Catholic Church titles
Preceded by Petrus Hou Jingwen	Bishop of Xianxian; 1999 –	Succeeded by Current
