= Adrien Languillat =

French Jesuit and missionary in China (1808–1878)

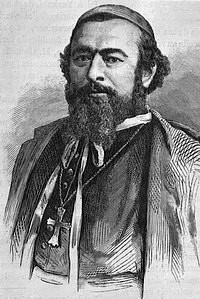
Bishop Adrien-Hippolyte Languillat, S.J.

Adrien-Hippolyte Languillat SJ (1808–1878) was a French Jesuit and missionary in China. He was titular bishop of Sergiopolis (1856–1878) and vicar apostolic of Southeastern Chi-Li (1856–1864) and Kiangnan (1864–1878).

== Life ==
Adrien-Hippolyte Languillat was born in Chantemerle, district of Épernay (Marne), on 28 September 1808. He was a French bishop who was Bishop in partibus of Sergiopolis, Apostolic Vicar of Nanjing and Honorary Member of the Société d'Agriculture, Commerce, Sciences et Arts de la Marne.

Languillat was ordained in Châlons-sur-Marne and was immediately placed as vicar in the parish of Notre-Dame, from where he was soon called to be parish priest of the Saint-Alpin church in Châlons. In 1841, he joined the Society of Jesus and went to China as a missionary.

In 1856, he was created Bishop in partibus of Sergiopolis, and appointed Apostolic Vicar of the new Apostolic Vicariate of the South-East Zheli, in the province of Nanjing, then in 1865, he was transferred to Jiangnan.

Soon after his appointment, he paid his respects to the French Minister to confirm French protection of the mission.

Languillat emphasized the importance of education in the work of the mission, and was eager to support the development of an indigenous clergy. To this end, he established a minor seminary.

In 1867, he had come to see his native country again and recruit nuns for the mission in China. He returned to China after three months in France, accompanied by six sisters of the Society of the Helpers of the Holy Souls who were to take charge of an orphanage in Zikawei (Shanghai). In Shanghai (which depended on Nanjing's headquarters), he approved the foundation of the Sisters of the Presentation (the presentandines) in 1873 for young Chinese women. Three nuns made their first vows that year. Their convent, closed after the 1949 revolution, reopened in 1985.

He also brought the Carmelites to (Shanghai). On 1 March 1868 Bishop Languillat consecrated the chapel and blessed the image of Our Lady of Sheshan, Help of Christians, which was copied from Our Lady of Victory in Paris. Languillat took part in the Vatican Council in 1870.

His last years were overshadowed by a stroke in 1874. He died in Zikawei (Shanghai) on 30 November 1878.
