= Diocese of Jingxian =

Roman Catholic diocese in China

Coordinates: 37°42′N 116°16′E

Diocese of Jingxian Dioecesis Chimsciensis 天主教景县教区

Location
- Country: China
- Ecclesiastical province: Beijing
- Metropolitan: Beijing

Statistics
- Area: 9,500 km^{2} (3,700 sq mi)
- Population: Total; Catholics: (as of 1950); 2,500,000; 32,645 (1.3%)

Information
- Rite: Latin Rite
- Cathedral: Cathedral of Our Lady Help of Christians in Jingxian, Hebei

Current leadership
- Bishop: Peter Feng Xinmao
- Metropolitan Archbishop: Joseph Li Shan

The Roman Catholic Diocese of Jingxian/Kinghsien (Latin: Chimscien(sis), Chinese: 景縣) is a diocese located in Jingxian (Hengshui) in the ecclesiastical province of Beijing in China.

== History ==
- April 24, 1939: Established as the Apostolic Prefecture of Jingxian 景縣 from the Apostolic Vicariate of Xianxian 獻縣
- January 9, 1947: Promoted as Diocese of Jingxian 景縣

== Leadership ==
=== Prefects Apostolic of Jingxian 景縣 (Roman Rite) ===
1. Fr. Leopoldo Brellinger, S.J. (凌安澜) (later Bishop) (May 4, 1939 – January 9, 1947)

=== Bishops of Jingxian 景縣 (Roman rite) ===
- Leopoldo Brellinger, S.J. (凌安澜) (January 9, 1947 – September 18, 1967)
- Peter Fan Wenxing, Chinese Patriotic Catholic Association (December 20, 1981 - 1999)
- Thomas Gao Yuchen (1989 - ?)
- Mathias Chen Xilu, Chinese Patriotic Catholic Association (1999 - January 16, 2008)
- Peter Feng Xinmao (January 16, 2008 - Current)
