= Helin (disambiguation) =

Helin is a lake in Norway.

Helin may also refer to:

- Helin (given name)
- Helin (surname)
- Helin, Poland, a village in Poland
- Helin, an historic name for Karakorum and Kharkhorin, Mongolia
- Helin, Sichuan (鹤林), a town in Qu County, Sichuan, China
- Helin, Chongqing (和林), a town in Chongqing, China
- Helin, a Manchu general who died in battle attempting to suppress the White Lotus Rebellion.

== See also ==
- He Lin (disambiguation)
