= Ming the Merciless =

Flash Gordon character

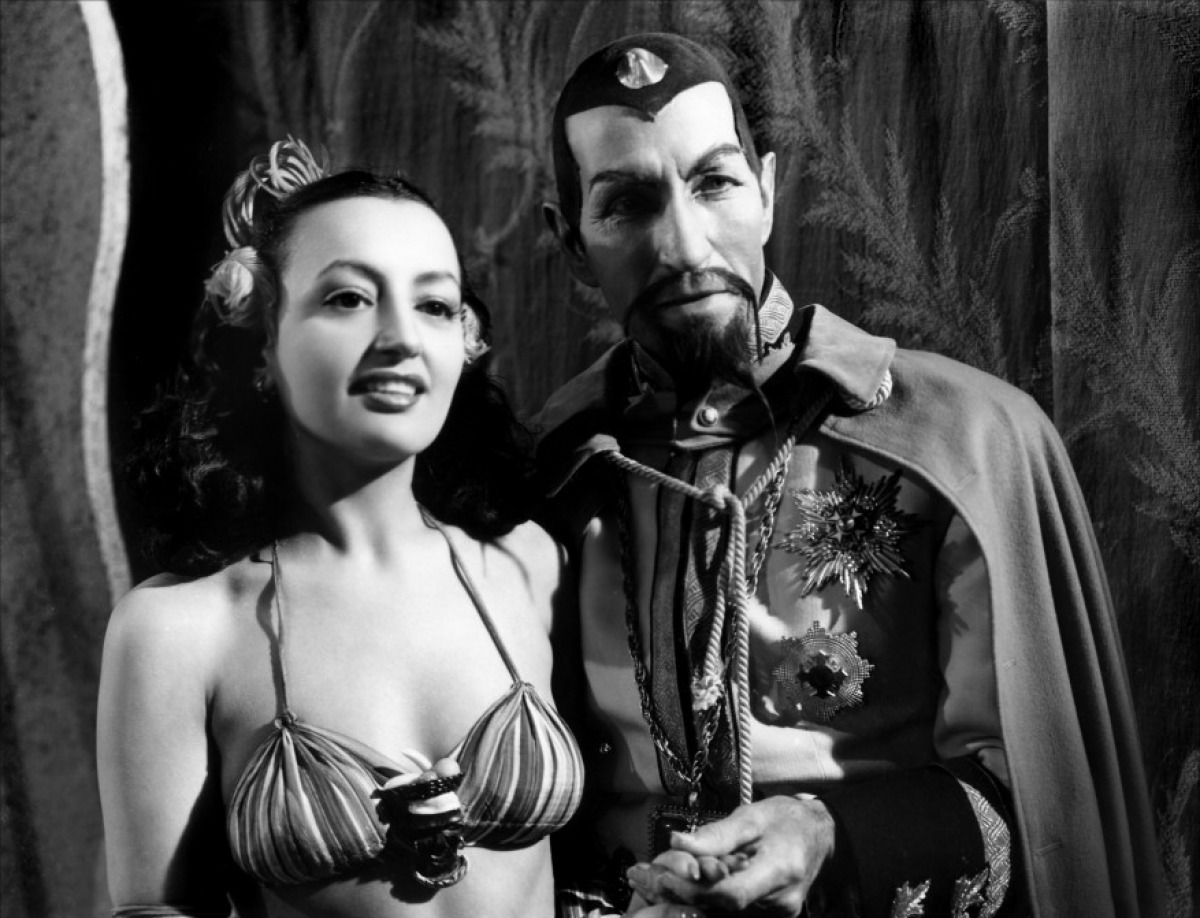
- Ming as portrayed by Charles Middleton in Flash Gordon Conquers the Universe (1940), seen with one of his dancers, actress Carmen D'Antonio.

Publication information
- Publisher: King Features Syndicate
- First appearance: Flash Gordon comic strip; (January 21, 1934) (Note: The character is identified as the "Emperor" in his first appearances, and is named "Ming" in the March 4, 1934 strip.)
- Created by: Alex Raymond

In-story information
- Place of origin: Mongo

Ming the Merciless is a fictional character who first appeared in the Flash Gordon comic strip in 1934. He has since been the main villain of the strip and its related movie serials, television series and film adaptation. Ming is depicted as a ruthless tyrant who rules the planet Mongo.

== Alex Raymond's comic strip ==
Flash Gordon and Dale Arden meet Ming the Merciless for the first time in the Flash Gordon comic serial "On the Planet Mongo" (1934), art by Alex Raymond.

In Alex Raymond's comic strip, when the heroic Flash Gordon and his friends land on the fictional planet Mongo, they find it ruled by an evil emperor, a despot who quickly becomes their enemy. He was not named at first, only being known as the Emperor until six weeks later, when his name was revealed to be "Ming".

The capital of his empire is named Mingo City in his honour. In addition to his army, Ming is shown to have access to a wide variety of science fiction gadgets, ranging from rocket ships to death rays to robots. Though evil, he has his weaknesses, which include a desire to marry Flash's beautiful companion, Dale Arden. Ming's daughter Princess Aura is as evil as he is when the series begins, but is eventually reformed by her love for Flash, and later for Prince Barin of Arboria.

Flash and his companions escape from Ming's clutches and find allies among the peoples of Mongo, including Barin, Prince Vultan, Prince Thun and Queen Fria. They organise a resistance movement against Ming's rule; the action of the resistance takes up much of the strip's story-lines. Ming was eventually overthrown, and Raymond pitted Flash against other enemies in the 1940s.

== Later comic strips ==
During Austin Briggs's run on the Flash Gordon strip, he introduced Ming's son, Kang the Cruel. Kang became Flash's main antagonist during Briggs' run.

In the 1956 story "Return to Mongo", Dan Barry introduced Ming's identical son, Ming II. This Ming behaved similarly to his father and became a semi-regular antagonist for Flash in Barry's strips. In the 1957 story "The Time Pendulum", a descendant of Ming from the future, Ming XIII, travels back in time to kill Flash and thus ensure the victory of his ancestor. Jim Keefe used Ming as Flash's main opponent during his run on the Flash Gordon comic strip.

== Comic books ==
In the 2011 Dynamite Comics Flash Gordon: Zeitgeist, Ming is shown as attempting to invade Earth in the year 1934. As in the 1980 film, Ming's main henchman is the masked Klytus. In this version Klytus has the full name Klytus Ra Djaaran, and is described as Ming's Grand Vizier and head of Ming's secret police. Ming is also shown as working with the Third Reich to conquer the planet. The prequel, Merciless: The Rise of Ming depicts Ming's ascent to power over Mongo. Merciless depicts Ming as the son of Emperor Krang, and the husband of Auranae, who becomes Princess Aura's mother.

In the later Dynamite Flash Gordon comic, King's Watch (unconnected to the events in Flash Gordon: Zeitgeist) Ming uses a dimensional portal to send his troops to the planet Earth. Flash, Dale and Zarkov travel to Mongo to stop Ming's attack. In the sequel story, Flash Gordon:The Man from Earth, Dale Arden learns that Ming uses special "Quantum Crystals" to expand his lifespan, and to travel to and conquer other star systems. Ming also forces some of Prince Barin's subjects to be enslaved, brainwashed, and turned into "Beastmen" warriors for Ming's army. Flash also witnesses a Mongo propaganda video which reveals Ming's full title as "Ming Gorzon-Hydraxus of Seledarqu".

== In other media ==
=== Radio ===
In the 1935 adaptation, The Amazing Interplanetary Adventures of Flash Gordon, Bruno Wick played Ming the Merciless.

=== Films ===
==== Flash Gordon (serials) ====
In the Flash Gordon serials of the late 1930s-era, Ming was portrayed by actor Charles B. Middleton. In the first serial, he is apparently killed in the Great Temple of Tao, in a possible suicide. He returns in the second serial in league with a Martian Queen, and using a Nitron Lamp to cause disasters on Earth. Instead of his stereotypical yellow peril appearance, he takes on a form resembling Satan in this serial. In Flash Gordon Conquers the Universe (1940), he is once again ruler of Mongo, but is killed when he is locked inside his tower and Flash crashes a ship into it. Ming takes on a Hitler-like persona in this pre WWII 1940 serial with references to him as "Dictator" and his wearing of elaborate military uniforms.

==== Flash Gordon film (1980) ====
Max von Sydow as Ming the Merciless and Ornella Muti as Princess Aura in the 1980 film Flash Gordon.

In the 1980 theatrical film, Ming (Max von Sydow), complaining of boredom, discovers Earth and unleashes various attacks on the planet. The film gives Ming a second-in-command, General Klytus, who is masked at all times and is attracted to Ming's daughter, Princess Aura. As in most versions, Ming is infatuated with Dale, whom he plans to marry. Ming's cruelty extends to his own daughter: in an effort to find Flash, he allows Klytus to continue torturing her, since she knows of his whereabouts. When Klytus is killed in the Hawkman city, Ming orders it to be destroyed. He offers Flash a chance to join him, rule a kingdom, and save Earth. Flash declines when he learns the Earth will be enslaved. Ming leaves him there to die, but Flash escapes on a rocket cycle.

At the climax of the film, Ming is impaled by his own war rocket, Ajax, of which Flash had taken control. After a vain attempt to stop Flash attacking him, he ultimately points his ring at himself and he vanishes. However, just before the credits begin, his ring is retrieved by an unknown individual, and the words "The End?" appear, as his evil laughter plays in the background.

The soundtrack album by the rock band Queen includes "Ming's Theme".

=== Television ===
==== The New Adventures of Flash Gordon (1979) ====
In this 1979 animated version of Flash Gordon. Ming's voice was provided by Vic Perrin in the pilot movie; in the series he was replaced by Alan Oppenheimer, who would later go on to voice Skeletor in He-Man. In this version, Ming's panoply is vividly displayed in the form of his vast fleet of battleships, drone rockets, armored trains, and his army of robots. He also employs Mongo's race of Lizard-Women as his enforcers in the mines of Mongo, as well as guards in his harem, and the primitive Beast-Men of Mongo not only serve him, but revere him as a god. In the fourth episode, "To Save Earth", Ming claims to be immortal.

==== Defenders of the Earth animated series (1986–1987) ====
Ming served as the principal adversary in the 1980s Marvel animated series Defenders of the Earth, fighting against other King Features characters such as The Phantom, Mandrake the Magician, Lothar, and of course Flash Gordon. In the opening episode, Ming successfully captures Dale Arden Gordon and her son Rick, and tears Dale's mind from her body, prompting a vengeful Flash to pursue him back to Earth to avenge her and prevent Ming from enslaving his world. Ming's base on Earth is in the depths of The Arctic and is called Ice Station Earth; his allies in this series are Garax, leader of the "Men of Frost", Ming's army of Ice Men, and Octon, a large tentacled battle computer.

This version of Ming also includes a son rather than a daughter at his side, Prince Kro-Tan; unlike Aura, he holds no love for any of the Defenders and considers both them and his father hindrances to his enslavement of the galaxy. Kro-Tan comes the closest to defeating his father in a five-part story where he successfully entraps Ming and takes over his forces, before Ming is released by the Defenders and takes his vengeance. Ming has two carrier spacecraft in this series, one of which is his "Throne Room", his main vessel, which could launch itself from the Arctic Ocean. This version is made more grotesque than his traditional appearance to avoid racial stereotyping, being portrayed as having green skin and pointed ears.

==== Flash Gordon animated series (1996) ====
In the 1996 animated series, Ming looks even more reptilian: he is a green, pointy-eared, sharp-toothed scaly alien, which cause the heroes to call him a "lizard". (Meanwhile, Aura has green skin, but is otherwise perfectly human.) In this version, Ming is presented as a more light-hearted, comic relief type of character.

==== Flash Gordon television series (2007–2008) ====
In the 2007 Sci-Fi Channel television series, Ming is portrayed by John Ralston as a clean shaven blond Caucasian. Executive producer David Hume has said that this interpretation of the character is "a Saddam Hussein kind of tyrant".

This version of Ming the Merciless is a media-savvy tyrant, who controls the planet through a monopoly on the production of clean water. He uses this control to extort wealth and obedience from the populace. He dresses in a quasi-military garb and seems to have some sort of militaristic position in addition to his role as a Water Baron and emperor. Ming's primary assistant in this story is Rankol, a cyborg who is an expert technologist.

Although as evil as ever, Ming is known as and addressed as "Benevolent Father". However, his people call him Ming the Merciless, because of his harsh and often brutal leadership. Ming was also known as Ming the Merciless during his military career and rise to power. He justifies everything he does as maintaining order and preventing a return to the chaos that occurred before he took power. Ming is depicted as having a son, Terek, whom he ordered killed at birth for being a Deviate. Later, it is revealed that Terek is not only alive, but that Terek's mother comes from a pure bloodline; this means that Ming is the source of Terek's deviation.

After Flash frees the planet's water reserves, the people of Mongo revolt against Ming when they discover that he has poisoned the planet's drinking water. Ming forms an alliance with Azura and her warriors in exchange for making her his queen, her army would battle against the rebels. She gives him an amulet. Ming is captured after a battle with Flash Gordon and Aura. Terek orders his execution. When Aura coldly tells her father 'good-bye', Ming finally admits he is proud of his daughter. Ming is placed inside a gas chamber. As the chamber filled with gas, Ming vanishes, having been teleported to safety by Azura's amulet.

== Reception ==
Ming has often been connected to the Yellow Peril imagery of the era, in which tyrannous East Asian villains such as Fu Manchu were common. His East Asian appearance, his name, referencing the Ming dynasty of China, and the name of his planet Mongo, "a contraction of Mongol", contribute to his Oriental identity.

Jonathan C. Friedman says that Ming and Fu Manchu were "the incarnations of the yellow peril in the Oriental crusade to conquer the world". Peter Feng calls him a "futuristic Yellow Peril", quoting a reviewer who referred to him as a "slanty eyed, shiny domed, pointy nailed, arching eyebrowed, exotically dressed Oriental".

According to Jim Harmon and Donald Glut, while Ming is modeled on Fu Manchu in the first Gordon serial, his appearance copies imagery of the devil in the second serial, Flash Gordon's Trip to Mars.

== In popular culture ==
Many parodies of Ming the Merciless have appeared in popular culture, including:

- "Muffet the Mericiless" in Ralph Bakshi's holiday special Christmas in Tattertown
- "Mung the Mirthless" in Wally Wood's comic strip Sally Forth
- "Wang the Perverted" in the sexploitation film Flesh Gordon
- "Count Zarth Arn" in the B movie space opera Starcrash
- "Gorzo the Mighty", a columnist for The Onion
- "Ding the Merciless", an opponent of Trash Gordon in one segment on Sesame Street
- "Moo-ing the Merciless", enemy of Lash Holstein, Space Cow-det in one episode of Muppets Tonight
- "Supreme Overlord Maximus IQ", the main villain on the animated series Atomic Betty
- "Dr. Chaotica" on Star Trek: Voyager as a Holodeck character in the episodes "Bride of Chaotica!", "Night" and "Shattered".
- "Mandrake the Malfeasant" on the animated series Wander Over Yonder – he appears only in the episodes "The Loose Screw" and "The Battle Royale".

Australian Prime Minister Sir Robert Menzies was nicknamed Ming the Merciless in part due to his preference for the traditional Scottish pronunciation of his surname. As a further extension of this nickname, the eponymous R G Menzies building at Monash University became colloquially known as the "Ming Wing". Scottish politician Menzies Campbell /ˈmɪŋɪs/ is sometimes nicknamed (with significant irony) "Ming the Merciless". Luke 'Ming' Flanagan, the Irish politician and cannabis legalisation campaigner, takes his name from his resemblance to Ming the Merciless.

In the 1989 edition of the Star Wars Sourcebook by Bill Slavicsek and Curtis Smith, a photograph of Max Von Sydow as Ming the Merciless from Flash Gordon is used to represent the character of the Grand Inquisitor, later voiced by Jason Isaacs in the first two seasons of the animated series Star Wars Rebels and portrayed by Rupert Friend in the Disney+ series Obi-Wan Kenobi.

In the Father Ted episode "Are You Right There Father Ted?", Ming is in one of Ted's slides to show he's not anti-Chinese as a joke because Ming is often criticised as a negative Chinese stereotype.

The British surreal sketch show Big Train features a Ming-style villain, portrayed by Mark Heap, going about mundane household tasks such as checking his answer phone and vacuuming.

Charles B. Middleton's portrayal of Ming from the 1930s serials appears during the opening titles of the Spanish dramedy The Last Circus (2010) by Alex de la Iglesia, along with classic movie monsters such as the Phantom of the Opera, Frankenstein's monster and Wolfman.

George Lucas has cited Ming the Merciless as a basis for Emperor Palpatine and Darth Vader from the Star Wars series.

Gene Wolfe's 1976 short story about the aftermath of a psychological experiment is called "When I Was Ming the Merciless".

An October 2001 installment of the comic strip Get Your War On by David Rees featured one of the characters joking that George W. Bush would reveal himself to be Ming the Merciless at a press conference.

In 2007, Ming the Merciless was ranked number 2 on the Forbes Fictional 15. The Chicago Sun-Times called him "the ultimate sci-fi tyrant", and The Irish Times wrote that he is "simply the best – the tyrant's tyrant".

Robert Wu portrays Quan Ming, who transforms into a version of Ming the Merciless during an hallucination that Sam J. Jones (the actor who plays Flash Gordon in the 1980 film) has in Seth MacFarlane's film, Ted (2012).

In the 2012 young adult novel Eleanor and Park, protagonist Eleanor Douglas puts eyeliner on her Korean American love interest Park Sheridan and makes a comment saying that he looks like Ming the Merciless; this quote is among many instances of the book that were accused of racism.
