= Francis Zhao Zhensheng =

Chinese Catholic bishop of Xianxian (1894–1968)

Francis Zhao Zhensheng S.J.
- Bishop of Xianxian
- Native name: 赵振声
- Church: Catholic Church
- Diocese: Diocese of Xianxian
- In office: 2 December 1937 – 1968
- Predecessor: Henri Lécroart
- Successor: Paul Li Zhenrong
- Previous post: Titular Bishop of Bisica (1937-1946)

Orders
- Ordination: 26 August 1923
- Consecration: 27 March 1938 by Joseph Cui Shouxun

Personal details
- Born: 30 November 1894 Jing County, Zhili, Great Qing
- Died: 1968 (aged 73–74)

Francis Zhao Zhensheng (Chinese: 赵振声; 30 November 1894 – 1968) was a Chinese Catholic bishop. He was bishop of the Roman Catholic Diocese of Xianxian during the mid-20th century and died in prison during the Cultural Revolution.

== Life ==
He was born on 30 November 1894, in Jing County, Hebei. His parents were Chinese Catholics. In 1913 he became a member of the Jesuits. In 1917, he went to Europe to study for the priesthood and was ordained in Belgium on 26 August 1923. He returned to China in 1925.

From 1931-1933 he was President of Tsin Ku University, a Jesuit-run university in Tianjin. In 1937, following the outbreak of the Japanese invasion of China, Bishop Henri Lecroart resigned and Fr. Francis Zhao was named as the new bishop of Xianxian. He held the titular bishopric of Bisca (Xianxian wasn't yet a diocese, but it was only a Vicariate Apostolic at the time). He ran the diocese through the Second World War.

In 1940, he received responsibility to direct the national propagation of faith of the Holy See and St Peter Community. In 1941, several collaborators were killed by Chinese soldiers who hid in the cathedral. In response, the Japanese bayoneted and buried alive 21 people at the cathedral; Bishop Francis and about 100 others were also arrested. The cathedral was also partially occupied by Japanese forces.

In 1946, the Vatican elevated a number of Vicariate Apostolics to dioceses throughout China, and Xianxian then formally became its own diocese with Bishop Francis Zhao as bishop. Fines and demands for reparations were pushed onto the diocese following the war (the local area was strongly under communist influence), leading to the exit of foreign missionaries from the diocese. Beijing Cardinal Thomas Tien Ken-sin had to leave China for medical treatment, but he ended up never returning and Bishop Francis Zhao took over administration of the Beijing Archdiocese. After the communists had taken full control, Bishop Francis Zhao went into hiding and carried out his work as a bishop clandestinely until 1953, when he returned to the open.

The communists confiscated large amounts of diocesan property in Xianxian throughout the 1950s. Bishop Francis Zhao was one of the Catholic leaders who took part in the meeting with Premier Zhou Enlai in 1956 that later led to the creation of the Chinese Catholic Patriotic Association the following year. He became one of the vice-chairmen of the new association after it was created and participated in a number of illicit ordinations (without papal approval) of new bishops within the association. In 1957 he became leader of the Hebei patriotic Catholic association. In 1962 he became vice-chairman of the national board of Catholic seminaries. He was part of Hebei's Chinese People’s Political Consultative Conference.

All masses, sacraments and pastoral works in the diocese were stopped by the 1960s. In 1966, the Cultural Revolution began and almost all religious activities throughout China were banned. In Xianxian diocese, a great deal of remaining church property was destroyed. Bishop Francis Zhao was beaten by Red Guards in 1967 and thrown off of a balcony, which left him injured. He was then imprisoned, where he was tortured and died shortly after in 1968.
