= Mathias Chen Xilu =

Mathias Chen Xilu (simplified Chinese: 陈锡禄; traditional Chinese: 陳錫祿; pinyin: Chén Xīlù; 6 February 1928 – 16 January 2008) was a Chinese Roman Catholic bishop of Hengshui, Hebei. He had been appointed to his post by the Vatican, and had been recognized by the government of the People's Republic of China.

== Life ==
Chen Xilu was born into a Catholic family in 1928. He initially enrolled at a minor Catholic seminary at the age of 15 before entering a larger seminary in Shanghai in 1950. He was ordained a priest in 1955 after which he worked as a doctor in a clinic in Jing county, Hebei province.

Chen was arrested for his religious beliefs in 1958. He was sent to a hard labor camp from 1969 to 1979. He returned to Hengshui diocese in 1979 following his release. He succeeded Bishop Petrus Fan Wenxing in 1996. The diocese consists of approximately 20,000 Roman Catholics. Chen fell into a coma due to a brain hemorrhage in 2002 and died on January 16, 2008, of organ failure in Jing county, Hebei. He was succeeded by Bishop Peter Feng Xinmao.

Catholic Church titles
Previous: Peter Fan Wenxing	Bishop of the Roman Catholic Diocese of Jingxian; 1999–2008	Next: Peter Feng Xinmao
