= Siyang middle school =

School in Jiangsu, China

Coordinates: 33°48′35.67″N 118°26′29.88″E

Siyang Middle School (simplified Chinese: 江苏省泗阳中学; traditional Chinese: 江蘇省泗陽中學) is a middle school in Jiangsu, China.

It was founded in 1927 in Jiangsu, China. In 1991, Siyang middle school went through the provincial key middle school review. In January 1999, it was approved by the provincial education commission and renamed "the jiangsu province siyang middle school". In the same year in July, Nanjing Normal University education signed a joint and Siyang middle school became Nanjing Normal University's experimental middle school. In April 2001, a national demonstration went through high school accreditation. In 2004, the provincial department of education selected it as a four-star school.

== Location ==
The school is located in the political and cultural center of town.

=== School size ===
Siyang middle school is the biggest middle school in Siyang, covering more than 290 acres with a total construction area of 193,640 square metres (2,084,300 sq ft).

==== Awards ====
Awards include "Jiangsu model school","Advanced group of jiangsu province" and "Suqian May 1 Labour Medal"
