= Xi County, Henan =

Xi County 息县
- County
- Location of the seat in Henan Xixian (China)
- Coordinates: 32°20′35″N 114°44′24″E
- Country: People's Republic of China
- Province: Henan
- Prefecture-level city: Xinyang

Area
  - Total: 1,836 km^{2} (709 sq mi)

Population (2019)
  - Total: 749,400
  - Density: 408.2/km^{2} (1,057/sq mi)
- Time zone: UTC+8 (China Standard)
- Postal code: 464300

Xi County or Xixian (simplified Chinese: 息县; traditional Chinese: 息縣; pinyin: Xī Xiàn) is a county in the southeast of Henan province, China. It is the northernmost county-level division of Xinyang. The primary dialect is Zhongyuan Mandarin.

== Administrative divisions ==
As of 2012, this county is divided to 6 towns and 14 townships.

Towns

- Chengguan (城关镇)
- Baoxin (包信镇)
- Xiazhuang (夏庄镇)
- Dongyue (东岳镇)
- Xiaohuidian (小茴店镇)
- Xiangdian (项店镇)

Townships

- Chengjiao Township (城郊乡)
- Sunmiao Township (孙庙乡)
- Lukou Township (路口乡)
- Zhangtao Township (张陶乡)
- Pengdian Township (彭店乡)
- Yangdian Township (杨店乡)
- Baitudian Township (白土店乡)
- Gangjidian Township (岗李店乡)
- Changling Township (长陵乡)
- Chenpeng Township (陈棚乡)
- Linhe Township (临河乡)
- Guandian Township (关店乡)
- Caohuanglin Township (曹黄林乡)
- Balicha Township (八里岔乡)

== Climate ==
Climate data for Xixian, elevation 34 m (112 ft), (1991–2020 normals, extremes 1981–present)
| Month | Jan | Feb | Mar | Apr | May | Jun | Jul | Aug | Sep | Oct | Nov | Dec | Year |
|---|---|---|---|---|---|---|---|---|---|---|---|---|---|
| Record high °C (°F) | 19.9 (67.8) | 27.0 (80.6) | 34.0 (93.2) | 33.8 (92.8) | 37.1 (98.8) | 37.8 (100.0) | 38.7 (101.7) | 38.5 (101.3) | 37.7 (99.9) | 33.9 (93.0) | 28.4 (83.1) | 22.0 (71.6) | 38.7 (101.7) |
| Mean daily maximum °C (°F) | 7.0 (44.6) | 10.3 (50.5) | 15.5 (59.9) | 22.1 (71.8) | 27.0 (80.6) | 30.1 (86.2) | 32.1 (89.8) | 30.9 (87.6) | 27.1 (80.8) | 22.4 (72.3) | 15.6 (60.1) | 9.4 (48.9) | 20.8 (69.4) |
| Daily mean °C (°F) | 2.3 (36.1) | 5.3 (41.5) | 10.2 (50.4) | 16.5 (61.7) | 21.7 (71.1) | 25.6 (78.1) | 27.9 (82.2) | 26.6 (79.9) | 22.2 (72.0) | 16.9 (62.4) | 10.2 (50.4) | 4.4 (39.9) | 15.8 (60.5) |
| Mean daily minimum °C (°F) | −1.2 (29.8) | 1.4 (34.5) | 6.0 (42.8) | 11.7 (53.1) | 17.0 (62.6) | 21.6 (70.9) | 24.6 (76.3) | 23.3 (73.9) | 18.5 (65.3) | 12.7 (54.9) | 6.1 (43.0) | 0.8 (33.4) | 11.9 (53.4) |
| Record low °C (°F) | −18.9 (−2.0) | −11.0 (12.2) | −6.5 (20.3) | 0.0 (32.0) | 5.6 (42.1) | 12.6 (54.7) | 18.2 (64.8) | 14.4 (57.9) | 7.6 (45.7) | 1.0 (33.8) | −8.0 (17.6) | −15.9 (3.4) | −18.9 (−2.0) |
| Average precipitation mm (inches) | 31.6 (1.24) | 36.5 (1.44) | 61.2 (2.41) | 68.3 (2.69) | 103.8 (4.09) | 146.0 (5.75) | 178.9 (7.04) | 162.5 (6.40) | 75.7 (2.98) | 65.1 (2.56) | 46.8 (1.84) | 23.5 (0.93) | 999.9 (39.37) |
| Average precipitation days (≥ 0.1 mm) | 6.8 | 7.8 | 8.7 | 8.5 | 10.6 | 9.3 | 10.9 | 11.1 | 9.2 | 8.6 | 7.9 | 5.9 | 105.3 |
| Average snowy days | 5.2 | 3.1 | 1.1 | 0 | 0 | 0 | 0 | 0 | 0 | 0 | 0.8 | 1.8 | 12 |
| Average relative humidity (%) | 74 | 73 | 71 | 72 | 73 | 77 | 82 | 84 | 81 | 76 | 75 | 73 | 76 |
| Mean monthly sunshine hours | 103.3 | 106.4 | 136.3 | 165.4 | 162.9 | 159.9 | 169.5 | 159.8 | 138.0 | 136.9 | 127.4 | 116.1 | 1,681.9 |
| Percentage possible sunshine | 32 | 34 | 36 | 42 | 38 | 38 | 39 | 39 | 38 | 39 | 41 | 37 | 38 |
Source: China Meteorological Administration
