= Cai Lanying =

Chinese paper-cut artist (1918–2005)

- 蔡蘭英
- Born: 1918; Xian County
- Died: 2005 (aged 86–87)
- Occupation: Papercut artist

Cai Lanying (蔡蘭英; 1918 – 2005) was a Chinese cut-paper artist.

Cai Lanying was born in 1918 in Xian County, Hebei, China. She was born into a peasant family and had little education; she was unable to read or write. She began papercutting at age eight and created over 10 thousand works.

Most of her works depict Chinese peasant life, including agricultural work, festivals, and folktales. Many of her works are autobiographical.

Her paper-cut of a rooster was selected for the annual Chinese zodiac stamp by the Ministry of Posts and Telecommunications for the 1993 Year of the Rooster. Her design features a rooster with cocked head and outspread wings above plum blossoms and a caption reading, "The rooster crows for the coming of spring."

Cai Lanying was invited to the World Conference on Women, 1995. Her work is in the collection of the National Art Museum of China.

Can Lanying died in 2005.
