= Linghe (disambiguation) =

Linghe (凌河) may refer to the following places in China:

- Linghe District, a district of Jinzhou, Liaoning
- Linghe Subdistrict, a subdistrict in Shuangta District, Zhaoyang, Liaoning
- Linghe, Shandong, a town in Anqiu, Shandong

== See also ==
- Linhe (disambiguation)
