= Beiliuzhi =

Beiliuzhi 北留智镇
- Town
- Běiliúzhì Zhèn
- Location in Hebei Location in China
- Coordinates: 37°36′17″N 116°16′39″E
- Country: People's Republic of China
- Province: Hebei
- Prefecture-level city: Hengshui
- County: Jing

Area
  - Total: 83.83 km^{2} (32.37 sq mi)

Population (2010)
  - Total: 30,270
  - Density: 361.1/km^{2} (935/sq mi)
- Time zone: UTC+8 (China Standard)

Beiliuzhi (Chinese: 北留智镇; pinyin: Běiliúzhì Zhèn) is a town located in Jing County, Hengshui, Hebei, China. According to the 2010 census, Beiliuzhi had a population of 30,270, including 15,150 males and 15,120 females. The population was distributed as follows: 5,718 people aged under 14, 22,043 people aged between 15 and 64, and 2,509 people aged over 65.

== See also ==
- List of township-level divisions of Hebei
