= He Lin =

He Lin or Lin He is the name of:

- Lin He (biologist) (何琳; born 1974), Chinese-American molecular biologist
- He Lin (actress) (何琳; born 1977), Chinese actress
- He Lin (贺林; born 1953), Chinese biologist, member of the Chinese Academy of Sciences
- He Lin (engineer) (何琳; born 1957), member of the Chinese Academy of Engineering

== See also ==
- Helin (disambiguation)
- Linhe (disambiguation)
