= Peter Fan Wenxing =

- Bishop of the Roman Catholic Diocese of Jingxian
- Church: Cathedral of Our Lady Help of Christians in Jingxian
- Diocese: Roman Catholic Diocese of Jingxian
- Installed: 1981
- Term ended: 1999
- Predecessor: Leopold Brellinger
- Successor: Mathias Chen Xilu

Orders
- Ordination: 1948

Personal details
- Born: January 27, 1921 Jing County, Hebei, China
- Died: February 28, 2006 (aged 85) China
- Denomination: Roman Catholic
- Education: Fu Jen Catholic University

Peter Fan Wenxing (simplified Chinese: 范文兴; traditional Chinese: 范文興; pinyin: Fàn Wénxīng; 27 January 1921 – 28 February 2006) was a Chinese Catholic priest and Bishop of the Roman Catholic Diocese of Jingxian from 1981 to 1999.

== Biography ==
Fan was born in the village of Zhujiahe, Jing County, Hebei, China on January 27, 1921. Fan began at junior seminary in 1935. He then studied at major seminars in Jing County and Beijing between 1941 and 1947. He was ordained a priest on May 30, 1948. He studied at Fu Jen Catholic University in Beijing. In 1950, he was appointed administrator of the Roman Catholic Diocese of Hengshui when the foreign missionaries were expelled. He worked as a physician at a hospital and preached until the outbreak of the Cultural Revolution in 1966. He was then sent to reform by working with salt extraction. In 1979, he returned to Jing County and worked at a county hospital. After he became bishop of the Roman Catholic Diocese of Hengshui in 1981, he established a junior seminary and built new churches. He wrote a short diocese story and dictated to his memory the constitution that had been lost to the sisters during the reigns of the Cultural Revolution. Fan retired in 1999 and was succeeded by Bishop Mathias Chen Xilu. Both Fan and Chen were approved by the Pope and recognized by the Communist government. He died on February 28, 2006.

Catholic Church titles
Previous: Leopold Brellinger	Bishop of the Roman Catholic Diocese of Jingxian; 1981–1999	Next: Mathias Chen Xilu
