= Linhe, Shaanxi =

Linhe 蔺河镇
- Town
- Location in China
- Coordinates: 32°19′1″N 108°56′44″E
- Country: People's Republic of China
- Province: Shaanxi
- Prefecture-level city: Ankang
- County: Langao County
- Time zone: UTC+8 (China Standard)

Linhe (simplified Chinese: 蔺河; traditional Chinese: 藺河; pinyin: Lìnhé) is a town under the administration of Langao County, Shaanxi, China. As of 2018, it has seven villages under its administration.
