= Linhe Township, Hebei =

Linhe Township 临河乡
- Township
- Location in Hebei
- Coordinates: 38°11′37″N 115°55′22″E
- Country: People's Republic of China
- Province: Hebei
- Prefecture-level city: Cangzhou
- County: Xian County
- Time zone: UTC+8 (China Standard)

Linhe Township (simplified Chinese: 临河乡; traditional Chinese: 臨河鄉; pinyin: Línhé Xiāng) is a township under the administration of Xian County, Hebei, China. As of 2018, it has 19 villages under its administration.
