= Xian County =

Xian County 献县
- County
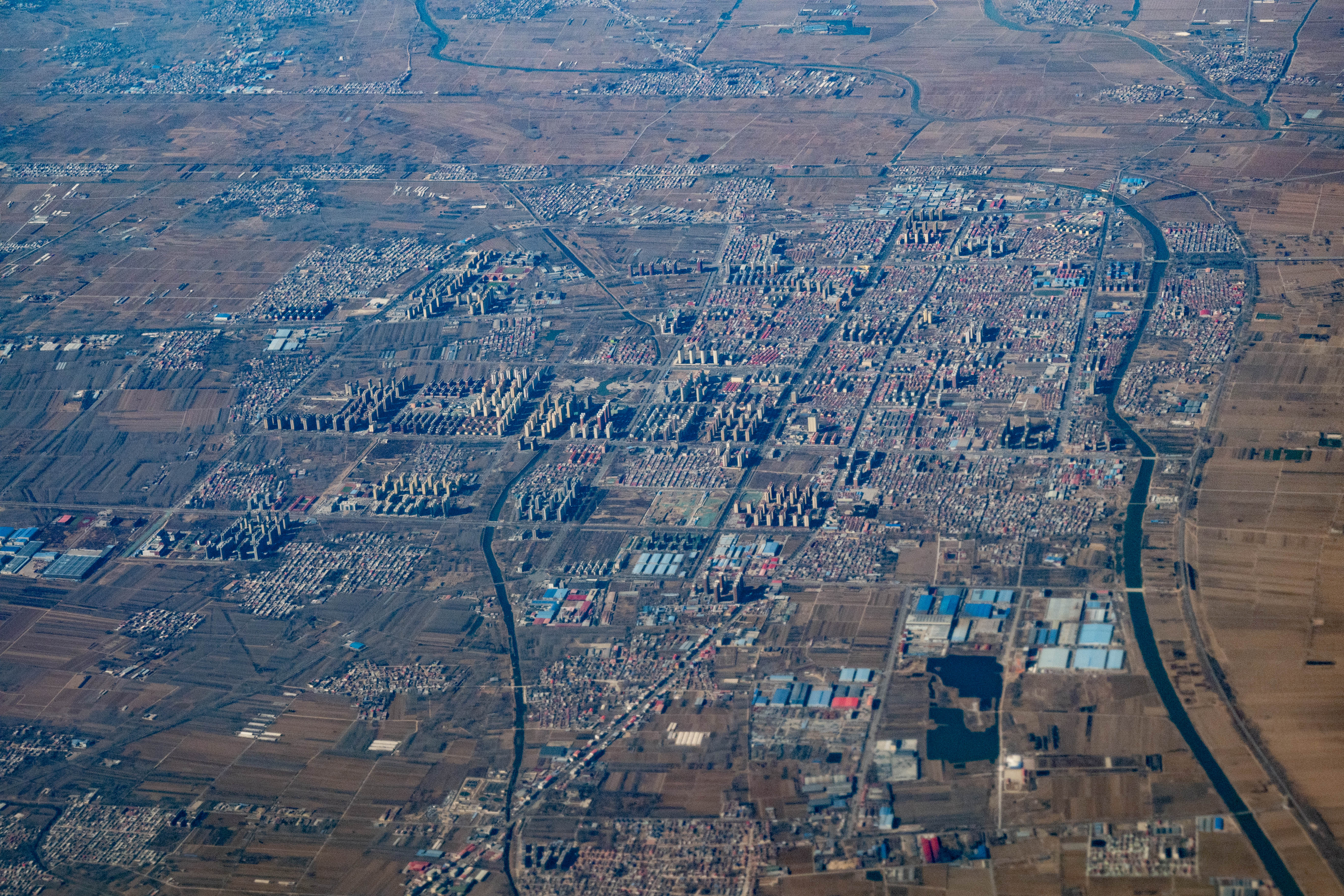

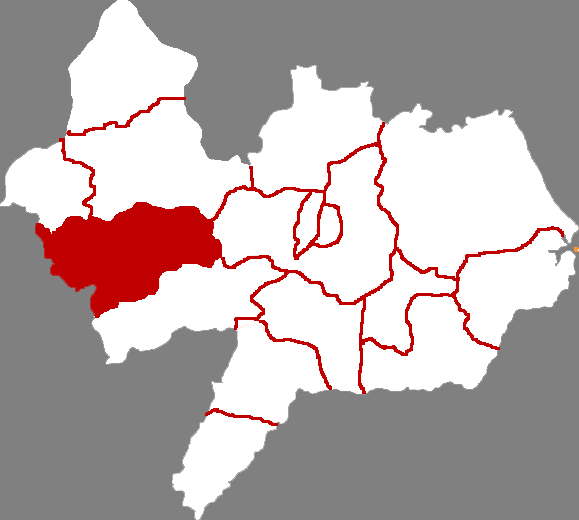
- Xian County in Cangzhou

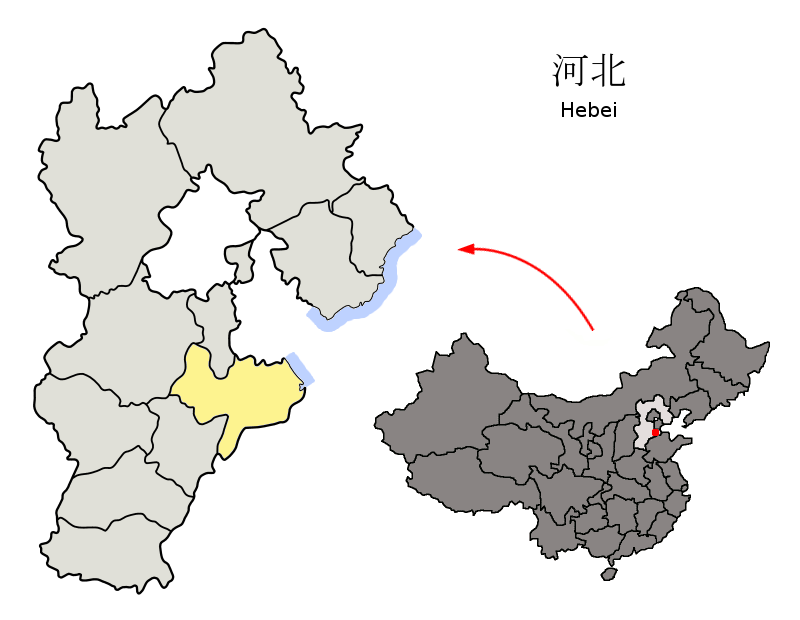
- Cangzhou in Hebei
- Coordinates: 38°11′24″N 116°07′23″E
- Country: People's Republic of China
- Province: Hebei
- Prefecture-level city: Cangzhou

Area
  - Land: 1,171 km^{2} (452 sq mi)

Population (2020)
  - Total: 568,418
  - Density: 485.4/km^{2} (1,257/sq mi)
- Time zone: UTC+8 (China Standard)

Xian County or Xianxian (simplified Chinese: 献县; traditional Chinese: 獻縣; pinyin: Xìàn Xiàn) is a county in the east of Hebei province of China. It is under the administration of the prefecture-level city of Cangzhou.

== History ==
The town was the seat of the Jesuit Catholic Mission, which also provided all of its bishops. Through missionaries who worked there, including the French Séraphin Couvreur and Léon Wieger, it also became a publishing center known in the Western world.

In 1856, the Diocese of Xianxian was established as the Apostolic Vicariate of Southeastern Zhili (Chinese: 直隸東南). In 1924, it was renamed the Apostolic Vicariate of Xianxian, and in 1946 it was elevated to a diocese. Its last bishop was Francis Xavier Zhao Zhensheng (Chinese: 趙振聲 / 赵振声), S.J.

The town is known for its cathedral in Dazhangzhuang, officially named Dazhangzhuang Yesu Shengxin Zhujiao Zuotang (Chinese: 大张庄耶稣圣心主教座堂; "Dazhangzhuang Sacred Heart of Jesus Cathedral").

== Administrative divisions ==
Towns:

- Leshou (乐寿镇), Huaizhen (淮镇镇), Guozhuang (郭庄镇), Hechengjie (河城街镇)

Townships:

- Hancun Township (韩村乡), Monan Township (陌南乡), Chenzhuang Township (陈庄乡), Gaoguan Township (高官乡), Shanglin Township (商林乡), Duancun Township (段村乡), Zhangcun Township (张村乡), Linhe Township (临河乡), Shuipingwang Township (小平王乡), Shiwuji Township (十五级乡), Leitou Township (垒头乡), Nanhetou Township (南河头乡), Xicheng Township (西城乡), Benzhai Hui Ethnic Township (本斋回族乡)

== Climate ==
Climate data for Xianxian, elevation 13 m (43 ft), (1991–2020 normals, extremes 1981–2010)
Month	Jan	Feb	Mar	Apr	May	Jun	Jul	Aug	Sep	Oct	Nov	Dec	Year
Record high °C (°F)	17.2 (63.0)	23.8 (74.8)	31.1 (88.0)	33.8 (92.8)	40.3 (104.5)	40.3 (104.5)	42.3 (108.1)	38.8 (101.8)	37.0 (98.6)	32.1 (89.8)	25.2 (77.4)	18.0 (64.4)	42.3 (108.1)
Mean daily maximum °C (°F)	3.0 (37.4)	7.2 (45.0)	14.3 (57.7)	21.8 (71.2)	27.7 (81.9)	32.2 (90.0)	32.5 (90.5)	30.8 (87.4)	27.2 (81.0)	20.7 (69.3)	11.4 (52.5)	4.3 (39.7)	19.4 (67.0)
Daily mean °C (°F)	−2.9 (26.8)	0.9 (33.6)	7.7 (45.9)	15.1 (59.2)	21.3 (70.3)	25.9 (78.6)	27.5 (81.5)	25.9 (78.6)	21.2 (70.2)	14.3 (57.7)	5.7 (42.3)	−1.0 (30.2)	13.5 (56.2)
Mean daily minimum °C (°F)	−7.2 (19.0)	−3.8 (25.2)	2.1 (35.8)	9.1 (48.4)	15.1 (59.2)	20.2 (68.4)	23.1 (73.6)	21.8 (71.2)	16.3 (61.3)	9.3 (48.7)	1.2 (34.2)	−4.9 (23.2)	8.5 (47.4)
Record low °C (°F)	−17.2 (1.0)	−15.3 (4.5)	−9.0 (15.8)	−1.1 (30.0)	5.8 (42.4)	10.5 (50.9)	16.5 (61.7)	13.4 (56.1)	5.9 (42.6)	−3.0 (26.6)	−14.0 (6.8)	−18.7 (−1.7)	−18.7 (−1.7)
Average precipitation mm (inches)	1.7 (0.07)	5.9 (0.23)	8.2 (0.32)	25.7 (1.01)	34.6 (1.36)	72.7 (2.86)	142.6 (5.61)	112.6 (4.43)	35.3 (1.39)	27.8 (1.09)	13.5 (0.53)	3.0 (0.12)	483.6 (19.02)
Average precipitation days (≥ 0.1 mm)	1.5	2.3	2.6	4.8	5.5	8.1	10.9	9.8	5.8	4.9	3.5	1.8	61.5
Average snowy days	2.1	2.2	0.7	0.2	0	0	0	0	0	0	1.2	2.2	8.6
Average relative humidity (%)	58	54	49	53	56	59	74	79	71	65	65	62	62
Mean monthly sunshine hours	167.7	179.8	235.8	251.9	279.2	243.1	212.0	212.7	217.5	205.9	170.2	161.8	2,537.6
Percentage possible sunshine	55	59	63	63	63	55	47	51	59	60	57	55	57
Source: China Meteorological Administration

== Notable people ==
- Cai Lanying; cut-paper artist

== See also ==
- Séraphin Couvreur, a French sinologist, died in Xian county in 1919.
- Roman Catholic Diocese of Xianxian
