= Peter Feng Xinmao =

- Bishop of the Roman Catholic Diocese of Jingxian
- Church: Cathedral of Our Lady Help of Christians in Jingxian
- Diocese: Roman Catholic Diocese of Jingxian
- Installed: 2008
- Predecessor: Mathias Chen Xilu

Orders
- Ordination: 1998

Personal details
- Born: January 21, 1963 (age 63) Shenzhou, Hebei, China
- Denomination: Roman Catholic
- Education: University of Leuven; National Seminary of Catholic Church in China
- Coat of arms

Peter Feng Xinmao (Chinese: 封新卯; pinyin: Fēng Xīnmǎo; born 21 January 1963) is a Chinese Catholic priest and Bishop of the Roman Catholic Diocese of Jingxian (Hengshui) since 2008.

== Biography ==
Feng was born in Shenzhou, Hebei on January 21, 1963. He was ordained a priest in 1998. In 1983 he entered the National Seminary of Catholic Church in China. He was ordained Coadjutor bishop of the Roman Catholic Diocese of Jingxian (Hengshui) on January 6, 2004. The regular bishop of Jingxian, Mathias Chen Xilu, had been in a coma since 2002 after a stroke. His predecessor, Bishop Peter Fan Wenxing, was retired and lived in a small congregation.

Feng became the first priest with a higher academic degree from abroad who was bishopriced for the Catholic Church in China after the religious policy of the Mao era was laid down in the 1980s and the religions were allowed to rebuild their work. He holds a master's degree in church law from 1998 from the University of Leuven in Belgium. He had also studied in Manila before returning to China, and taught English and philosophy at the regional seminar in Shijiazhuang, capital of his home province. On January 21, 2011, he was elected president of Hebei Seminary.

Catholic Church titles
Previous: Mathias Chen Xilu	Bishop of the Roman Catholic Diocese of Jingxian; 2008	Incumbent
