= Helin (given name) =

Helin (Kurdish: Hêlîn) is a Kurdish female given name which means "bird's nest". It is also used as a given name in Estonia.

== People ==
- Helin Bölek (1991–2020), Kurdish singer
- Helin Kandemir (born 2004), Turkish actress, voice actress and model
- Helin Evrim Sommer (born 1985), Kurdish-German Politician
- Hêlîn Qereçox (1991–2018), British YPJ fighter
