= Siyang County =

Siyang 泗阳县 Szeyang
- County
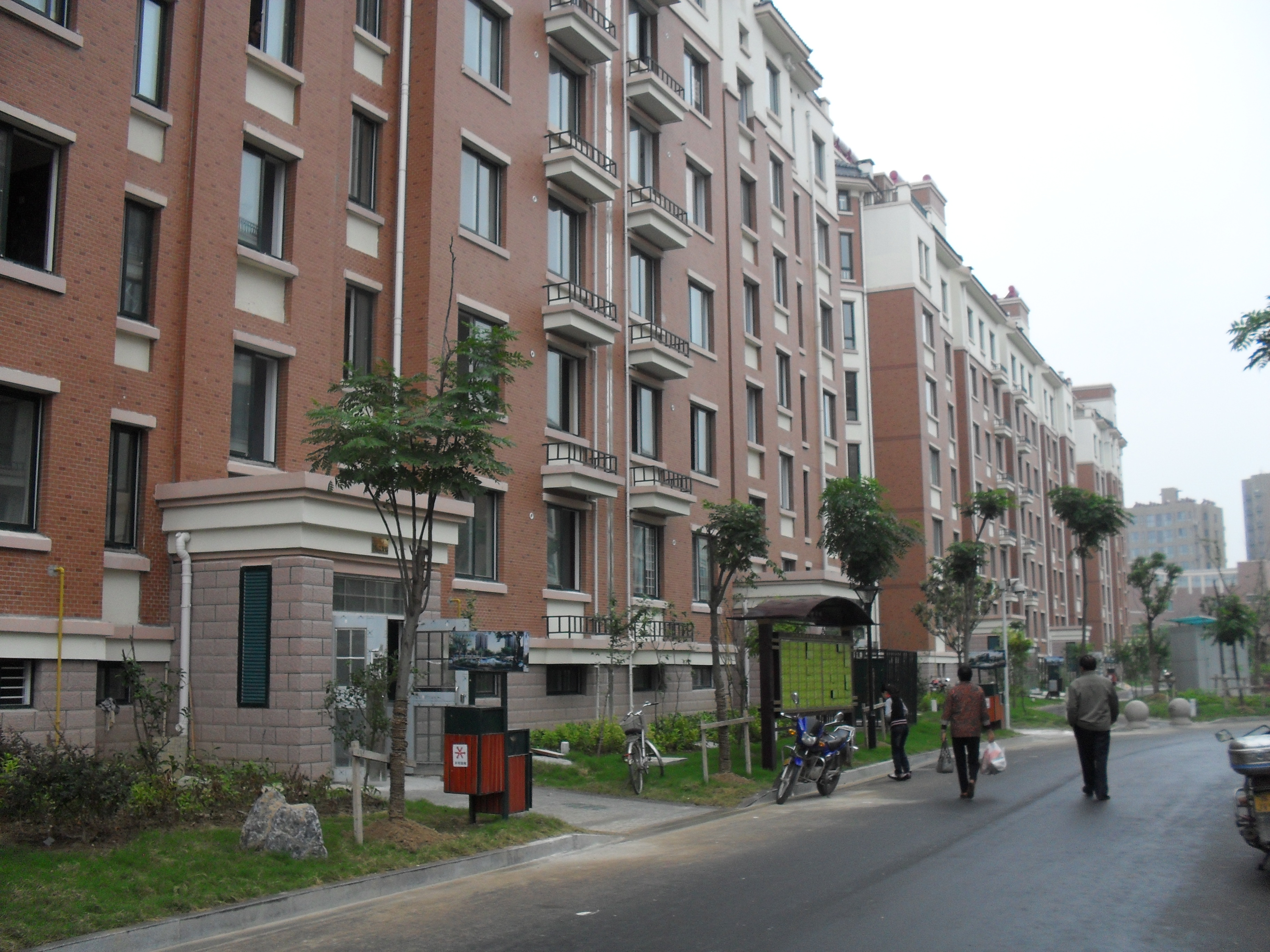
- Residential area in Siyang County

- Location in Jiangsu
- Coordinates: 33°43′16″N 118°42′11″E
- Country: People's Republic of China
- Province: Jiangsu
- Prefecture-level city: Suqian

Area
  - Total: 1,418 km^{2} (547 sq mi)

Population (2020 census)
  - Total: 829,562
  - Density: 585.0/km^{2} (1,515/sq mi)
- Time zone: UTC+8 (China Standard)
- Postal code: 223700

Siyang County (simplified Chinese: 泗阳县; traditional Chinese: 泗陽縣; pinyin: Sìyáng Xiàn) is under the administration of Suqian, Jiangsu province, China. It borders the prefecture-level city of Huai'an to the southeast.

Siyang County is recognized for its extensive cultivation of Italian poplar trees and its developed forestry industry. The region features a high density of poplar forest coverage and has been designated as the "Hometown of Poplars in China". Additionally, Siyang is home to a dedicated Poplar Museum and hosts an annual Poplar Festival (YangShuJie).

== Administrative divisions ==
At present, Siyang County has 11 towns and 5 townships.

11 towns

- Zhongxing (众兴镇)
- Aiyuan (爱园镇)
- Wangji (王集镇)
- Peixu (裴圩镇)
- Xinyuan (新袁镇)
- Likou (李口镇)
- Linhe (临河镇)
- Chuancheng (穿城镇)
- Luji (卢集镇)
- Gaodu (高渡镇)
- Zhangjiaxu (张家圩镇)

5 townships

- Zhuangwei (庄圩乡)
- Liren (里仁乡)
- Sanzhuang (三庄乡)
- Baji (八集乡)
- Nanliuji (南刘集乡)

== Climate ==
Climate data for Siyang, elevation 15 m (49 ft), (1991–2020 normals, extremes 1964–present)
Month	Jan	Feb	Mar	Apr	May	Jun	Jul	Aug	Sep	Oct	Nov	Dec	Year
Record high °C (°F)	18.5 (65.3)	25.4 (77.7)	32.9 (91.2)	32.6 (90.7)	35.4 (95.7)	36.9 (98.4)	39.2 (102.6)	39.2 (102.6)	35.5 (95.9)	32.9 (91.2)	27.2 (81.0)	20.1 (68.2)	39.2 (102.6)
Mean daily maximum °C (°F)	5.9 (42.6)	8.8 (47.8)	14.2 (57.6)	20.7 (69.3)	25.8 (78.4)	29.3 (84.7)	31.3 (88.3)	30.7 (87.3)	27.0 (80.6)	21.9 (71.4)	15.0 (59.0)	8.3 (46.9)	19.9 (67.8)
Daily mean °C (°F)	1.6 (34.9)	4.2 (39.6)	9.1 (48.4)	15.4 (59.7)	20.8 (69.4)	24.7 (76.5)	27.5 (81.5)	26.8 (80.2)	22.5 (72.5)	16.9 (62.4)	10.2 (50.4)	3.8 (38.8)	15.3 (59.5)
Mean daily minimum °C (°F)	−1.6 (29.1)	0.6 (33.1)	5.0 (41.0)	10.7 (51.3)	16.1 (61.0)	20.7 (69.3)	24.4 (75.9)	23.8 (74.8)	19.0 (66.2)	12.9 (55.2)	6.3 (43.3)	0.3 (32.5)	11.5 (52.7)
Record low °C (°F)	−13.5 (7.7)	−14.7 (5.5)	−6.6 (20.1)	−0.8 (30.6)	5.4 (41.7)	11.7 (53.1)	18.4 (65.1)	14.1 (57.4)	9.7 (49.5)	0.5 (32.9)	−5.8 (21.6)	−14.8 (5.4)	−14.8 (5.4)
Average precipitation mm (inches)	27.3 (1.07)	29.9 (1.18)	42.9 (1.69)	47.4 (1.87)	70.8 (2.79)	140.7 (5.54)	231.3 (9.11)	176.6 (6.95)	91.2 (3.59)	44.3 (1.74)	43.4 (1.71)	22.2 (0.87)	968 (38.11)
Average precipitation days (≥ 0.1 mm)	5.7	6.5	7.2	7.5	8.0	8.9	13.4	12.6	8.1	6.2	6.4	5.0	95.5
Average snowy days	3.3	2.6	1.1	0	0	0	0	0	0	0	0.6	1.2	8.8
Average relative humidity (%)	68	67	65	65	69	73	81	83	78	72	71	68	72
Mean monthly sunshine hours	141.8	138.9	175.9	197.8	204.0	166.1	168.7	170.8	167.9	169.7	146.8	148.7	1,997.1
Percentage possible sunshine	45	44	47	51	47	39	39	42	46	49	47	48	45
Source: China Meteorological Administration all-time extreme temperature
