= Diocese of Xianxian =

Latin Catholic jurisdiction in China

Coordinates: 38°12′N 116°07′E

Diocese of Xianxian Dioecesis Scienscienensis 天主教献县教区
- Sacred Heart Cathedral

Location
- Country: China
- Ecclesiastical province: Beijing

Statistics
- Area: 8,400 km^{2} (3,200 sq mi)
- Population: Total; Catholics: (as of 1950); 2,200,000; 62,000 (2.8%)

Information
- Denomination: Catholic Church
- Sui iuris church: Latin Church
- Rite: Roman Rite
- Cathedral: Cathedral of the Sacred Heart in Xianxian

Current leadership
- Pope: Leo XIV
- Bishop: Joseph Li Liangui
- Metropolitan Archbishop: Joseph Li Shan

The Diocese of Xianxian/Síenhsíen (Latin: Scienscienen(sis), Chinese: 獻縣) is a Latin Church ecclesiastical jurisdiction or diocese of the Catholic Church in China. Its episcopal see is the village of Zhangzhuang in Xianxian. The diocese is a suffragan diocese in the ecclesiastical province of the metropolitan Archdiocese of Beijing.

== History ==
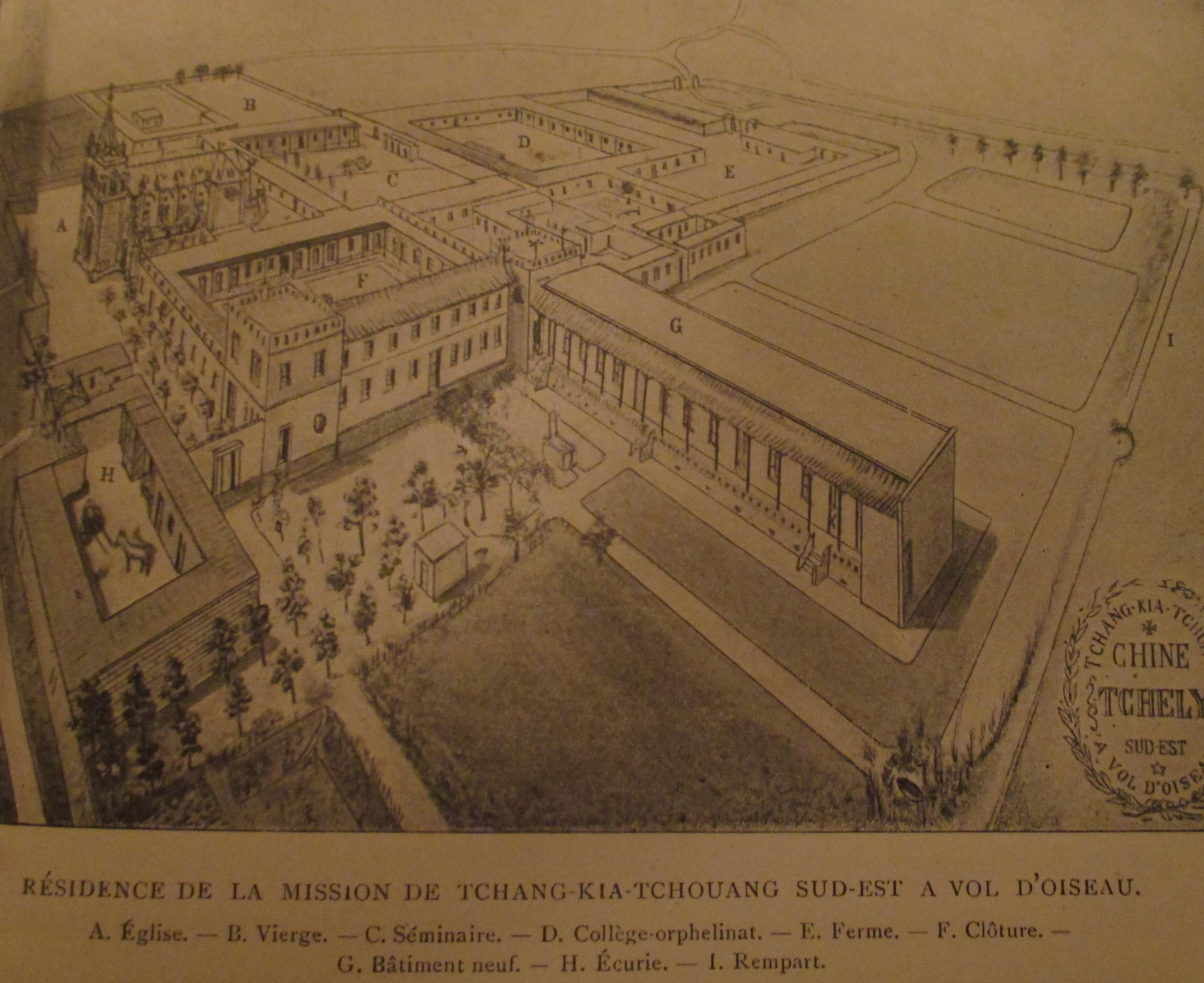
View of the mission at the end of the 19th century

- May 30, 1856: Established as Apostolic Vicariate of Southeastern Chi-Li 直隸東南 from the Diocese of Beijing 北京
- December 3, 1924: Renamed as Apostolic Vicariate of Xianxian 獻縣
- April 11, 1946: Promoted as Diocese of Xianxian 獻縣

=== Ancient to 20th century ===
According to the Zizhi Tongjian, Nestorian Christians were active in this area during the Tang dynasty. When John of Montecorvino served as bishop of Khanbalik (Beijing) during the Yuan dynasty, there was a Catholic parish in Hejian, located in what is now-modern Cangzhou (in Xianxian diocese).

During the Ming dynasty, when Matteo Ricci came to Beijing, he passed through what would later become the territory of Xianxian diocese several times. He also established a Catholic community in Hejian. Johann Adam Schall von Bell and Nicolò Longobardo also did missionary work in the territory that later became Xianxian diocese.

In 1856, the Apostolic Vicariate of Southeastern Zhili (Chi-li) was created out of Beijing, and was composed of 35 counties, including the land that later became the diocese of Xianxian. French Jesuit Adrien Languillat was appointed as its first bishop. Due to the fact that this was during the middle of the Taiping war (when the Qing empire was fighting against rebels who were led by people who claimed to be Christians) Languillat's ordination had to be done in secret in a small house.

When the Vicariate Apostolic was first founded, the bishop's seat was originally located in the village of Zhaozhuang in Wei County (modern diocese of Xingtai), however, after being repeatedly attacked by bandits, the bishop moved to Zhangzhuang village in Xian county in 1861 where it is still located now (Xian = county in Chinese, therefore Xian county = Xianxian). In 1862 members of the White Lotus society engaged in violence in the area. The cathedral, dedicated to the Sacred Heart of Jesus, was built in 1863.

A cholera outbreak occurred in the area that claimed the life of visiting bishop Bishop André‑Pierre Borgniet of Nanjing. Languillat then became the new bishop of Nanjing. In 1865, he resigned and ordained the French Jesuit Edouard-Auguste Dubar(杜巴爾) to succeed him as bishop of Southeastern Zhili. In 1868, the Nian Rebellion came to the area and destroyed more than 200 villages, leaving many local Catholics homeless. A major flood occurred in 1871, following by a drought, famine and outbreaks of plague. Dubar died from plague in 1878. Joseph Gonnet, the local Jesuit superior, ran the vicariate until 1880 when Henri-Joseph Bulté was appointed as its new bishop. In 1883 more flooding occurred that left many Catholics homeless, some of whom died from hunger or exposure after becoming homeless.

The Vicariate Apostolic suffered greatly during the Boxer Rebellion of 1900, along with neighbouring Catholic communities in northern China. More than 600 churches were destroyed by the Boxers and an estimated 5000 Catholic civilians were killed (estimated at about 10% of the Vicariate's Catholic population), including 4 priests. A few of these martyrs were included in the list of 120 martyr saints of China canonized by John Paul II in 2000. Bishop Bulte died shortly after. French Jesuit Henri Maquet was chosen to replace him in 1901.

=== 20th century ===
Another drought occurred in 1902-1903 accompanied by an outbreak of cholera.

Maquet died and was replaced by his coadjutor Henri Lécroart in 1919. In 1924, the Vicariate was renamed as the Vicariate Apostolic of Xianxian. Due to the growing population of the Vicariate and the bad state of the roads that made it difficult for the bishop to do pastoral visits, with the Pope's approval, land was broken off from the Vicariate to form new vicariates; by 1939 it was composed of only nine counties. In 1928, large devastation occurred amidst fighting between the Northern Expedition and Liu Guitang's bandits.

Lecroart's health worsened and he resigned from his position in 1937 following the outbreak of the Japanese invasion. The cathedral was bombed by the Japanese in 1937 due to the fact that wounded Chinese soldiers were being cared for by the Vicariate. Chinese Jesuit Francis Zhao Zhensheng was appointed the new bishop; he was the first native-born bishop of the area. The 1938 Yellow River flood devastated the area and the Vicariate engaged in charitable works to help victims. In 1939 Japanese soldiers shot 24 people at the major seminary and burned six churches. In September 1941, after three collaborators were killed nearby, Japanese soldiers shot or buried alive 19 people at the cathedral.

In 1946, Pius XII, as part of his reorganization of the church in China, made Xianxian into a formal diocese. Following the war's end and a surge in Chinese nationalism, the vicariate/diocese, which was still heavily linked with foreign Jesuits, was hit with demands for reparations payments by Chinese. The Jesuits had to leave the diocese permanently. Cardinal Thomas Tian Gengxin departed his archdiocese of Beijing in 1948 and never returned, and Bishop Francis Zhao took over administrative responsibilities of Beijing archdiocese. After the victory of the communist party in 1949, Bishop Francis continued to work in secret until 1953 when he returned back to the cathedral in Zhangzhuang.

The communists confiscated large amounts of diocesan property and dissolved the Xianxian seminary. In 1955 a local flood caused serious damage. From 1956-1958, many priests were arrested and imprisoned as China nationalized its church and attempted to separate it from Rome. In 1959 only one church remained operating in Xianxian. In 1960 priests were no longer permitted to give sacraments or do mass. In 1964 priests were banned from doing any pastoral work. In 1965 the diocese's religious convent was dissolved by the bishop.

In 1966, the Cultural Revolution began across China and almost all religious buildings across China were closed and/or destroyed. Most diocesan property was ransacked and destroyed, including the cathedral. Many clergy, religious and laypeople were imprisoned or sent to camps due to their religious affiliation. The elderly Bishop Francis Zhao was beaten by red guards in Baoding in 1967 who also threw him off of a balcony. He was subsequently imprisoned, tortured and died in prison the following year.

=== Re-opening of the diocese ===
In 1979, priests were allowed to say mass again and gradually the diocese was allowed to recover some of its previous properties that were returned to religious use. It was also granted money by the government to rebuild.

In 1982, Chinese Jesuit priest John Liu Dinghan was elected the new bishop of Xianxian by the Patriotic Association; he did not receive formal approval from Rome to become bishop.

In 1981，the government-controlled Catholic church in Hebei reorganized its diocesan boundaries to match the administrative boundaries of Hebei. This led to boundary changes that were not approved by the Vatican, including some land being exchanged to and from Xianxian diocese. Xianxian diocese then, within the Patriotic Association's boundaries, became the same as Cangzhou city region and it was renamed the diocese of Cangzhou by the Patriotic Association. Neighbouring Langfang city region (including Sanhe) was then left in an awkward position, since it was the only city region in Hebei that did not have its own diocese within Hebei. Historically the territory of this region had been mostly included within the Beijing archdiocese, but since Beijing priests were not permitted to work in Hebei, the Beijing archdiocese could not administer it. The Patriotic association established a "Langfang diocese", which in practice was run by clergy from Xianxian diocese, who worked under the formal name that they were priests within Langfang's Catholic association. Langfang continues to be run by clergy of Xianxian diocese today.

Paul Song Weili was ordained bishop by underground bishop Peter Joseph Fan Xueyan of the diocese of Baoding in 1982 and put in charge of Catholics in Langfang for the underground church, where he served until his death in 1996. In 1993, he came 'above-ground' as the government-recognized bishop of Langfang.

The underground Catholic community also ordained their own bishop for Xianxian diocese in 1983. Chinese Jesuit priest Paul Li Zhenrong became underground bishop for Xianxian. Bishop Paul Li was arrested in 1989 and released to be placed into house arrest in 1990. He died in 1992. The underground community did not recognize the boundary changes and continued to work within the traditional boundaries recognized by the Vatican. Following the death of Bishop Paul Li, the underground church has not had a new bishop for Xianxian.

Bishop John Liu retired in 1998 and his coadjutor Peter Hou Jingwen succeeded him as bishop. However, Bishop Peter Hou died in a car accident in 1999 while doing an inspection of "Langfang diocese". Bishop John Liu had to briefly come out of retirement to manage the diocese before Fr. Joseph Li Liangui became the diocese's new bishop in 2000. Bishop Joseph Li today has approval from both the Chinese government and the Vatican.

Sacred Heart Cathedral, which was badly damaged during the Cultural revolution, was fully demolished in 1976. After the diocese was permitted to resume worship again in 1979, reconstruction began on a new cathedral, which was built slightly to the west of the original location and opened in 2001.

== Leadership ==
- Bishops of Xianxian
  - Bishop Joseph Li Liangui (March 20, 2000 – present)
  - Bishop Francis Zhao Zhensheng, S.J. (趙振聲) (April 11, 1946 – October 15, 1968)
- Vicars Apostolic of Xianxian 獻縣
  - Bishop François-Xavier Zhao Zhen-sheng, S.J. (趙振聲) (December 2, 1937 – April 11, 1946)
  - Bishop Henri Lécroart, S.J. (劉欽明) (December 23, 1919 – December 2, 1936)
- Vicars Apostolic of Southeastern Chi-Li 直隸東南
  - Bishop Henri Maquet, S.J. (馬澤軒) (July 20, 1901 – December 23, 1919)
  - Bishop Henri-Joseph Bulté, C.M. (步天衢) (March 14, 1880 – October 14, 1900)
  - Bishop Edouard-Auguste Dubar, S.J. (杜巴爾) (September 9, 1864 – July 1, 1878)
  - Bishop Adrien-Hippolyte Languillat, S.J. (郎怀仁) (May 30, 1856 – September 9, 1864)

== See also ==
- Imprimerie de la Mission Catholique (Sienhsien)
