= Chantemerle =

- Commune
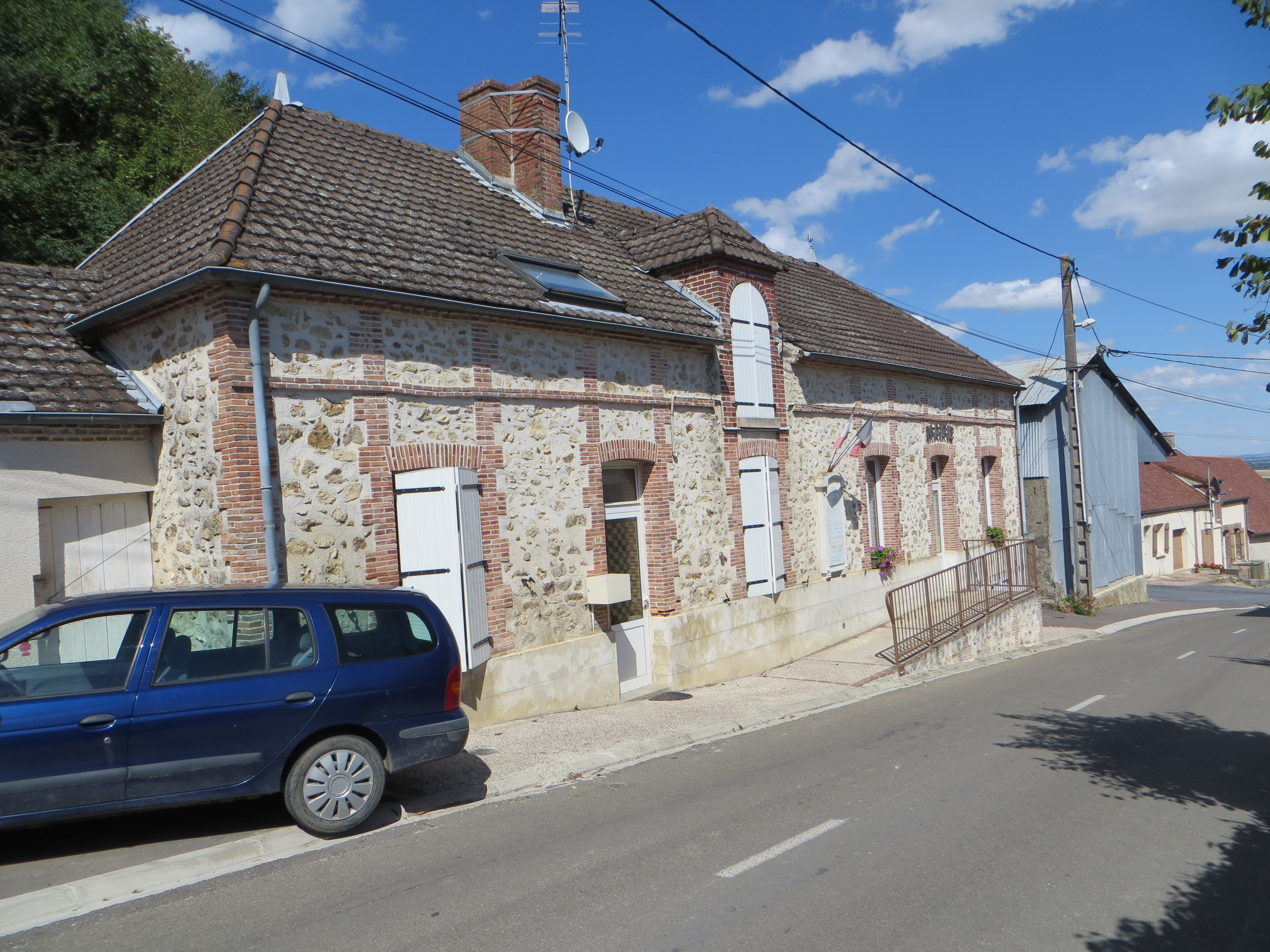
- The town hall in Chantemerle
- Location of Chantemerle
- Location within France Location within Grand Est
- Coordinates: 48°36′47″N 3°39′36″E
- Country: France
- Region: Grand Est
- Department: Marne
- Arrondissement: Épernay
- Canton: Sézanne-Brie et Champagne

Government
  - Mayor (2020–2026): Jean-Baptiste Seguin
- Area^{1}: 8.51 km^{2} (3.29 sq mi)
- Elevation: 162 m (531 ft)
- Population (2023): 48
  - Density: 5.6/km^{2} (15/sq mi)
- Time zone: UTC+01:00 (CET)
  - Summer (DST): UTC+02:00 (CEST)
- INSEE/Postal code: 51124 /51260
- ^{1} French Land Register data, which excludes lakes, ponds, glaciers > 1 km^{2} (0.386 sq mi or 247 acres) and river estuaries.

Chantemerle (French pronunciation: [ʃɑ̃tmɛʁl]) is a commune in the Marne department in north-eastern France.

== See also ==
- Communes of the Marne department
