= Linhe, Jiangsu =

Linhe 临河镇
- Town
- Location in Jiangsu
- Coordinates: 33°43′46″N 118°32′16″E
- Country: People's Republic of China
- Province: Jiangsu
- Prefecture-level city: Suqian
- County: Siyang County
- Time zone: UTC+8 (China Standard)

Linhe (simplified Chinese: 临河; traditional Chinese: 臨河; pinyin: Línhé) is a town under the administration of Siyang County, Jiangsu, China. As of 2018, it has two residential communities and 12 villages under its administration.
