= Linhe Township, Henan =

Linhe Township 临河乡
- Township
- Location in Henan
- Coordinates: 32°18′36″N 114°58′37″E
- Country: People's Republic of China
- Province: Henan
- Prefecture-level city: Xinyang
- County: Xi County
- Time zone: UTC+8 (China Standard)

Linhe Township (simplified Chinese: 临河乡; traditional Chinese: 臨河鄉; pinyin: Línhé Xiāng) is a township under the administration of Xi County, Henan, China. As of 2018, it has 15 villages under its administration.
