= Langao County =

Coordinates: 32°12′45″N 108°51′50″E

Langao County 岚皋县 Lankao
- County
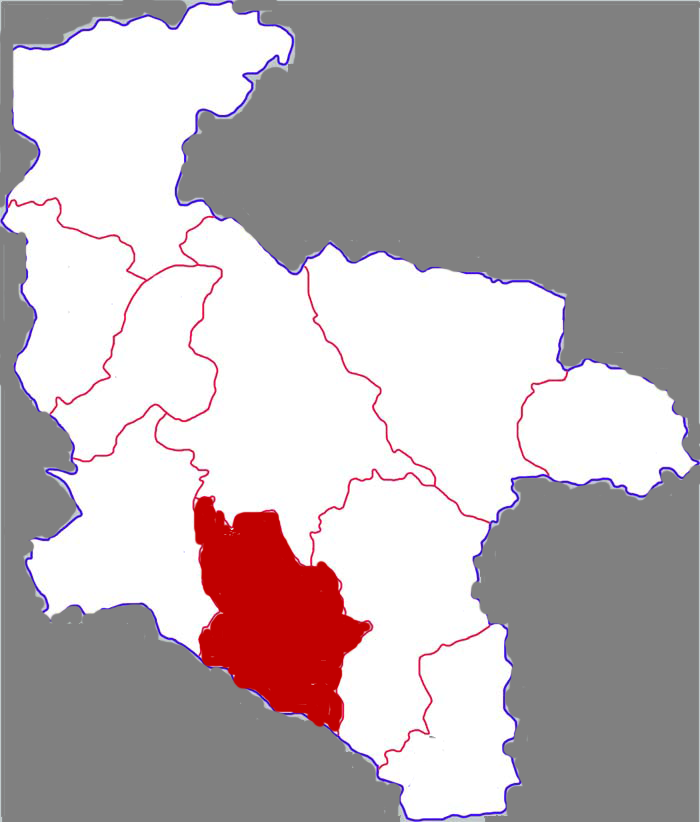
- Langao in Ankang

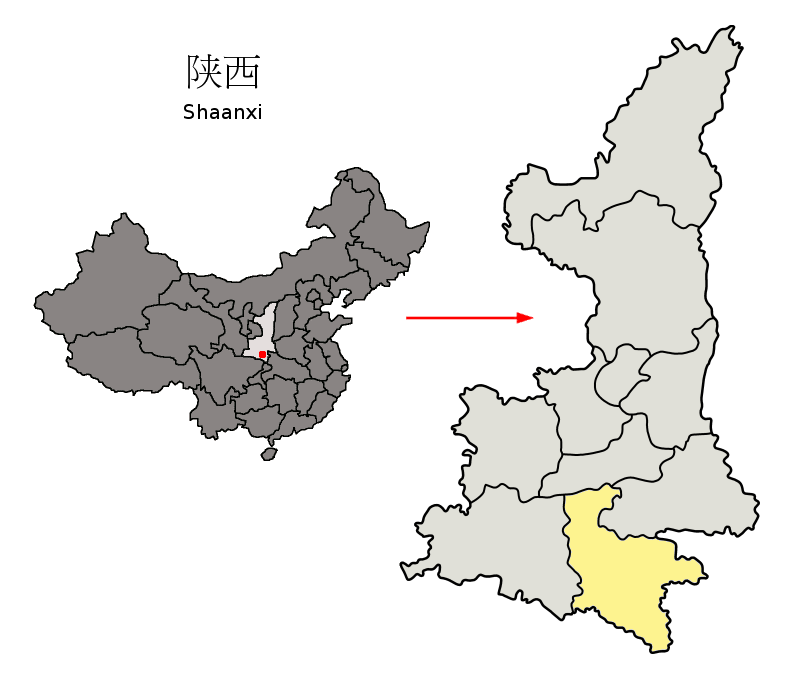
- Ankang in Shaanxi
- Country: People's Republic of China
- Province: Shaanxi
- Prefecture-level city: Ankang

Area
  - Total: 1,957.26 km^{2} (755.70 sq mi)

Population (2018)
  - Total: 156,455
  - Density: 79.9357/km^{2} (207.033/sq mi)
- Time zone: UTC+8 (China standard time)
- Postal Code: 725400

Langao County (simplified Chinese: 岚皋县; traditional Chinese: 嵐皋縣; pinyin: Lángāo Xiàn) is a county under the administration of Ankang, in the south of Shaanxi province, China. It borders Chongqing to the south.

== Administrative divisions ==
As of 2019, Langao County is divided to 12 towns.

Towns

- Chengguan (城关镇)
- Zuolong (佐龙镇)
- Taohe (滔河镇)
- Guanyuan (官元镇)
- Shimen (石门镇)
- Minzhu (民主镇)
- Dadaohe (大道河镇)
- Yanmen (堰门镇)
- Linhe (蔺河镇)
- Siji (四季镇)
- Mengshiling (孟石岭镇)
- Nangongshan (南宫山镇)

== Climate ==
Climate data for Langao, elevation 439 m (1,440 ft), (1991–2020 normals, extremes 1981–present)
Month	Jan	Feb	Mar	Apr	May	Jun	Jul	Aug	Sep	Oct	Nov	Dec	Year
Record high °C (°F)	19.8 (67.6)	23.5 (74.3)	33.3 (91.9)	36.1 (97.0)	37.3 (99.1)	38.9 (102.0)	40.1 (104.2)	40.9 (105.6)	40.7 (105.3)	31.9 (89.4)	26.2 (79.2)	19.5 (67.1)	40.9 (105.6)
Mean daily maximum °C (°F)	9.0 (48.2)	12.0 (53.6)	17.2 (63.0)	23.3 (73.9)	26.6 (79.9)	30.0 (86.0)	32.3 (90.1)	31.7 (89.1)	26.3 (79.3)	20.8 (69.4)	15.5 (59.9)	10.4 (50.7)	21.3 (70.3)
Daily mean °C (°F)	4.0 (39.2)	6.6 (43.9)	11.1 (52.0)	16.5 (61.7)	20.2 (68.4)	23.9 (75.0)	26.4 (79.5)	25.8 (78.4)	21.2 (70.2)	15.8 (60.4)	10.2 (50.4)	5.3 (41.5)	15.6 (60.1)
Mean daily minimum °C (°F)	0.7 (33.3)	2.9 (37.2)	6.6 (43.9)	11.5 (52.7)	15.5 (59.9)	19.4 (66.9)	22.2 (72.0)	21.8 (71.2)	17.8 (64.0)	12.8 (55.0)	7.0 (44.6)	2.0 (35.6)	11.7 (53.0)
Record low °C (°F)	−5.7 (21.7)	−4.6 (23.7)	−3.1 (26.4)	0.5 (32.9)	7.2 (45.0)	11.9 (53.4)	13.8 (56.8)	14.8 (58.6)	9.6 (49.3)	−0.6 (30.9)	−2.1 (28.2)	−10.4 (13.3)	−10.4 (13.3)
Average precipitation mm (inches)	8.7 (0.34)	14.9 (0.59)	36.8 (1.45)	66.8 (2.63)	117.9 (4.64)	143.0 (5.63)	178.8 (7.04)	135.5 (5.33)	136.4 (5.37)	92.9 (3.66)	32.6 (1.28)	11.2 (0.44)	975.5 (38.4)
Average precipitation days (≥ 0.1 mm)	6.8	7.5	10.6	11.6	13.8	13.5	15.0	12.6	13.3	13.2	9.6	8.0	135.5
Average snowy days	4.2	2.2	0.8	0.1	0	0	0	0	0	0	0.5	1.8	9.6
Average relative humidity (%)	72	69	67	69	73	75	77	77	80	82	80	76	75
Mean monthly sunshine hours	84.3	77.8	118.6	152.2	157.9	169.3	201.7	195.8	120.3	94.8	91.6	88.8	1,553.1
Percentage possible sunshine	26	25	32	39	37	40	47	48	33	27	29	29	34
Source: China Meteorological Administration
