= Jing County, Hebei =

Jing County 景县
- County
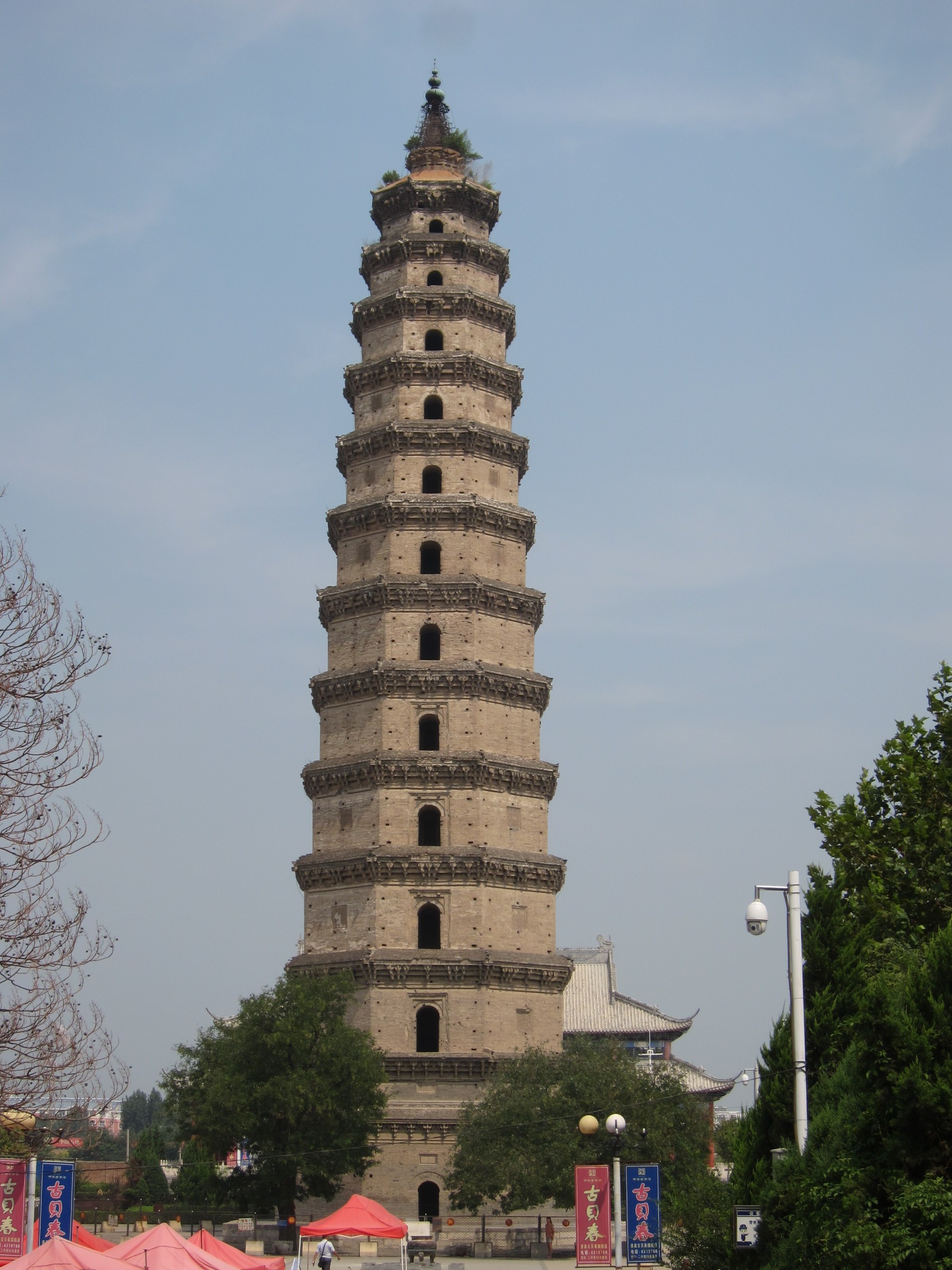
- Jingzhou Pagoda

- Location of the seat in Hebei
- Coordinates: 37.692°N 116.271°E
- Country: People's Republic of China
- Province: Hebei
- Prefecture-level city: Hengshui
- Time zone: UTC+8 (China Standard)
- Postal code: 053300
- Website: www.jingxian.gov.cn

Jing County or Jingxian (simplified Chinese: 景县; traditional Chinese: 景縣; pinyin: Jǐng Xiàn) is a county in Hengshui, Hebei province, People's Republic of China. It has an area of 1,183 km^{2} (457 sq mi) and has 500,000 inhabitants. Its seat is the town of Jingzhou (景州镇).

== Administrative divisions ==
Towns

- Jingzhou (景州镇), Longhua (龙华镇), Guangchuan (广川镇), Jing County (王瞳镇), Jiangheliu (洚河流镇), Anling (安陵镇), Duqiao (杜桥镇), Wangqiansi (王谦寺镇), Beiliuzhi (北留智镇), Liuzhimiao (留智庙镇)

Townships

- Liuji Township (刘集乡), Lianzhen Township (连镇乡), Liangji Township (梁集乡), Wencheng Township (温城乡), Houliumingfu Township (后留名府乡), Qinglan Township (青兰乡)

== Climate ==
Climate data for Jingxian, elevation 15 m (49 ft), (1991–2020 normals, extremes 1981–2010)
Month	Jan	Feb	Mar	Apr	May	Jun	Jul	Aug	Sep	Oct	Nov	Dec	Year
Record high °C (°F)	16.1 (61.0)	22.5 (72.5)	30.8 (87.4)	33.1 (91.6)	40.3 (104.5)	41.3 (106.3)	42.2 (108.0)	36.6 (97.9)	36.6 (97.9)	32.7 (90.9)	26.0 (78.8)	18.2 (64.8)	42.2 (108.0)
Mean daily maximum °C (°F)	3.3 (37.9)	7.4 (45.3)	14.3 (57.7)	21.5 (70.7)	27.4 (81.3)	32.1 (89.8)	32.3 (90.1)	30.6 (87.1)	27.2 (81.0)	21.0 (69.8)	11.9 (53.4)	4.8 (40.6)	19.5 (67.1)
Daily mean °C (°F)	−2.5 (27.5)	1.2 (34.2)	7.8 (46.0)	14.9 (58.8)	21.1 (70.0)	25.9 (78.6)	27.4 (81.3)	25.7 (78.3)	21.1 (70.0)	14.5 (58.1)	6.0 (42.8)	−0.6 (30.9)	13.5 (56.4)
Mean daily minimum °C (°F)	−7.2 (19.0)	−3.8 (25.2)	2.3 (36.1)	9.1 (48.4)	15.0 (59.0)	20.1 (68.2)	23.0 (73.4)	21.5 (70.7)	16.1 (61.0)	9.3 (48.7)	1.4 (34.5)	−4.8 (23.4)	8.5 (47.3)
Record low °C (°F)	−20.1 (−4.2)	−17.3 (0.9)	−10.3 (13.5)	−2.8 (27.0)	3.1 (37.6)	9.8 (49.6)	16.3 (61.3)	13.4 (56.1)	4.5 (40.1)	−3.6 (25.5)	−14.8 (5.4)	−22.5 (−8.5)	−22.5 (−8.5)
Average precipitation mm (inches)	2.4 (0.09)	7.6 (0.30)	7.7 (0.30)	29.4 (1.16)	34.7 (1.37)	71.5 (2.81)	151.7 (5.97)	124.6 (4.91)	36.2 (1.43)	29.2 (1.15)	14.2 (0.56)	3.2 (0.13)	512.4 (20.18)
Average precipitation days (≥ 0.1 mm)	1.6	2.7	2.4	5.2	6.2	8.0	11.1	9.6	6.2	5.3	3.9	2.0	64.2
Average snowy days	2.6	2.9	1.0	0.2	0	0	0	0	0	0	1.1	1.6	9.4
Average relative humidity (%)	59	56	51	55	59	59	75	80	72	65	66	63	63
Mean monthly sunshine hours	162.2	165.5	219.0	234.8	262.0	222.4	178.2	186.7	189.8	188.8	154.1	152.5	2,316
Percentage possible sunshine	53	54	59	59	59	50	40	45	52	55	51	51	52
Source: China Meteorological Administration

== Transportation ==
The county is served by Jingzhou railway station.
